= Amazing Race Suomi season 2 =

Amazing Race Suomi
- Season 2
- Presented by: Heikki Paasonen
- No. of days: 24
- No. of teams: 11
- Winners: Metti Forssell & Hanna Launonen
- No. of legs: 12
- Distance traveled: 20,000 km (12,000 mi)
- No. of episodes: 12

Release
- Original network: Nelonen
- Original release: 5 October – 21 December 2024

Additional information
- Filming dates: 22 May – 14 June 2024

Series chronology
- ← Previous; Season 1 Next → Season 3

This is the second season of Amazing Race Suomi (English: Amazing Race Finland), a Finnish reality competition show based on the American series The Amazing Race. Hosted by Heikki Paasonen, it features eleven teams of two, each with a pre-existing relationship and including at least one celebrity contestant, competing in a race around Central Europe and Latin America to win €30,000. This season visited three continents and six countries and travelled over 20,000 kilometres (12,000 mi) during twelve legs. Starting in Vantaa, racers travelled through Poland, Romania, Colombia, Panama and Costa Rica before returning to Finland and finishing in Helsinki. The Express Pass was introduced as a new twist for this season. The season premiered on 5 October 2024 on Nelonen and concluded on 21 December 2024.

Childhood friends Metti Forssell and Hanna Launonen won this season, while actress Mimosa Willamo and her father Patrick "Pati" Willamo finished in second place, and brothers Elias Aalto and Matias Pietilä finished in third place.

== Production ==
=== Development and filming ===
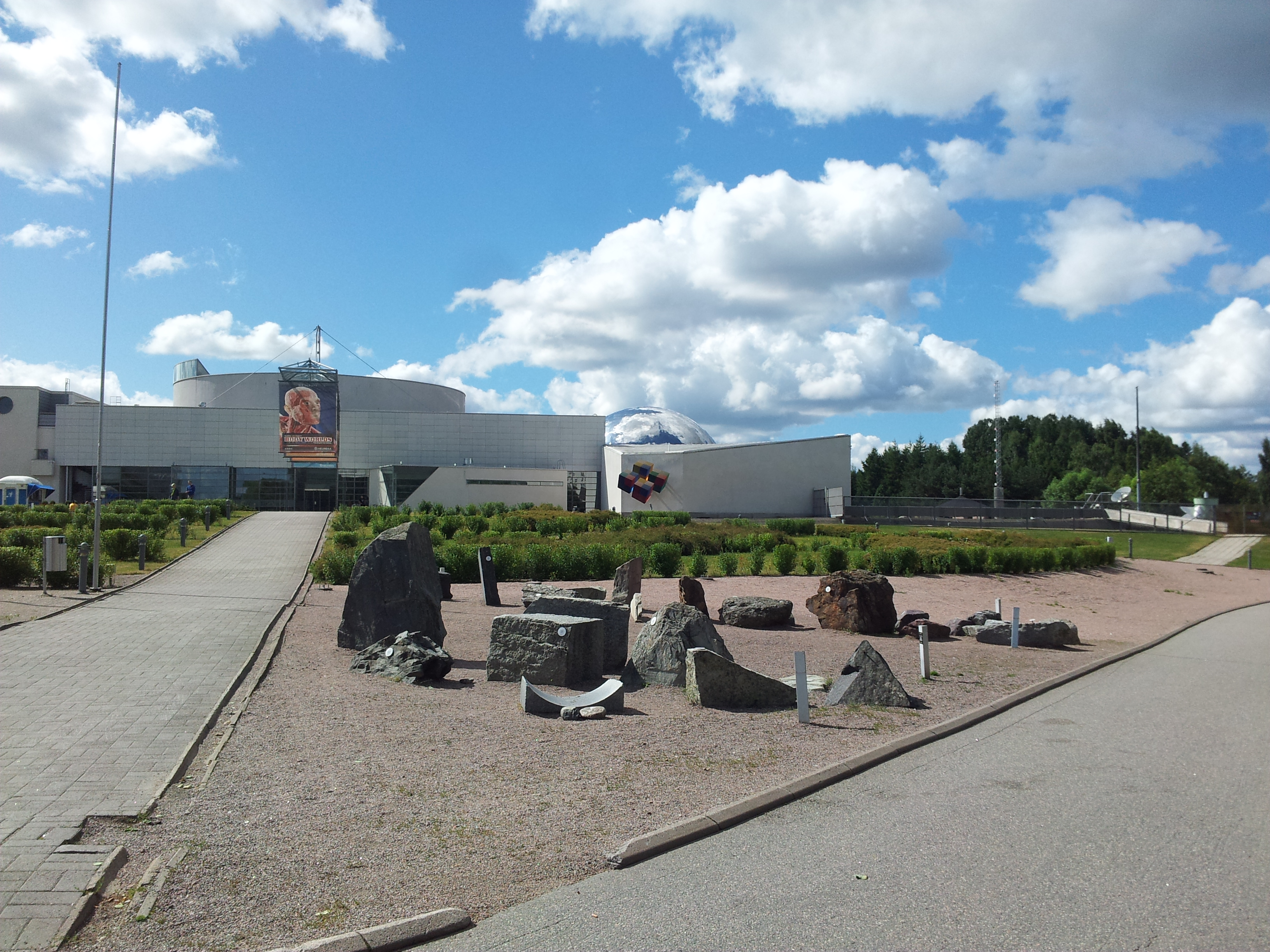
The second season began outside the Heureka science center in Vantaa.

On 21 May 2024, Nelonen announced that Amazing Race Suomi was renewed for a second season. The channel announced that the celebrity contestants will travel approximately the same distance by airplanes as they did in the first season (roughly 20,000 kilometres or 12,000 miles), to minimize the amount of carbon emissions produced during filming. Like the previous season, this season was hosted by Heikki Paasonen and feature pairs of two competing for the prize of €30,000.

Production of this season began on 22 May 2024, and for the first time in the show's history – outside Helsinki – in the city of Vantaa at the Heureka science center, with the eleven celebrity pairs competing on this season also revealed. The season saw a new "gamechanger" element. The winners of the first leg earned themselves an Express Pass (Express–Passi), that can be used to skip one of the many future tasks. On 14 June, many of the contestants of the season returned from social media breaks after production of this finished. The Speed Bump (Hidaste) was now patched as a mandatory obstacle for each team finishing last on every non-eliminating leg.

== Release ==
=== Broadcast ===
Upon the start of the production, the second season of Amazing Race Suomi was announced to premiere in October 2024. Finland's most comprehensive television guide, Telsu, first stated the season premiere episode to be aired on 5 October.

The first trailer for the season was published on the show's official social media on 31 August 2024.

This season of Amazing Race Suomi had a behind-the-scenes podcast called Amazing-podcast hosted by contestants Adeliina Arajuuri and Jeremie Malolo with episodes released on Supla following the broadcast release of each television episode.

== Cast ==
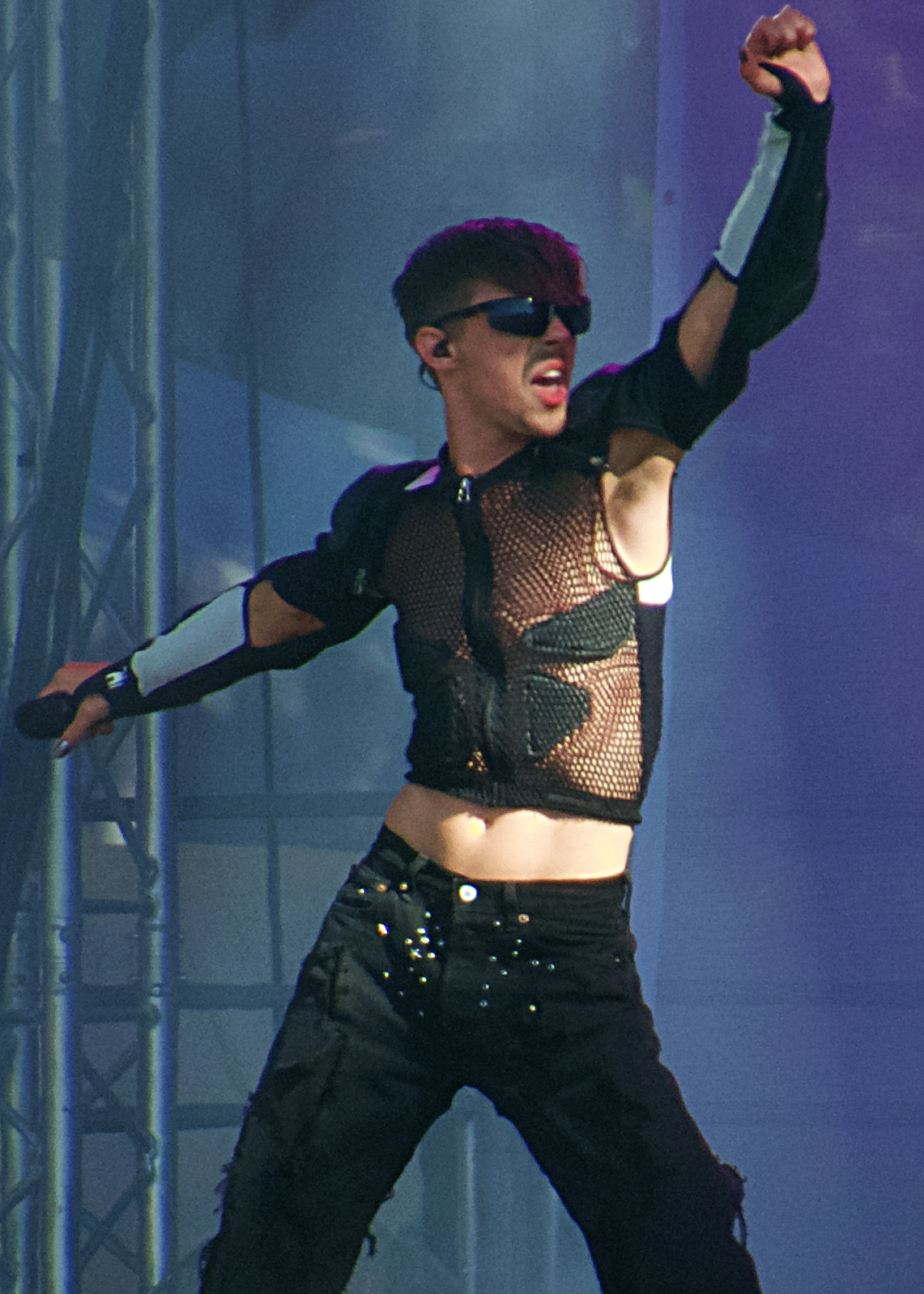
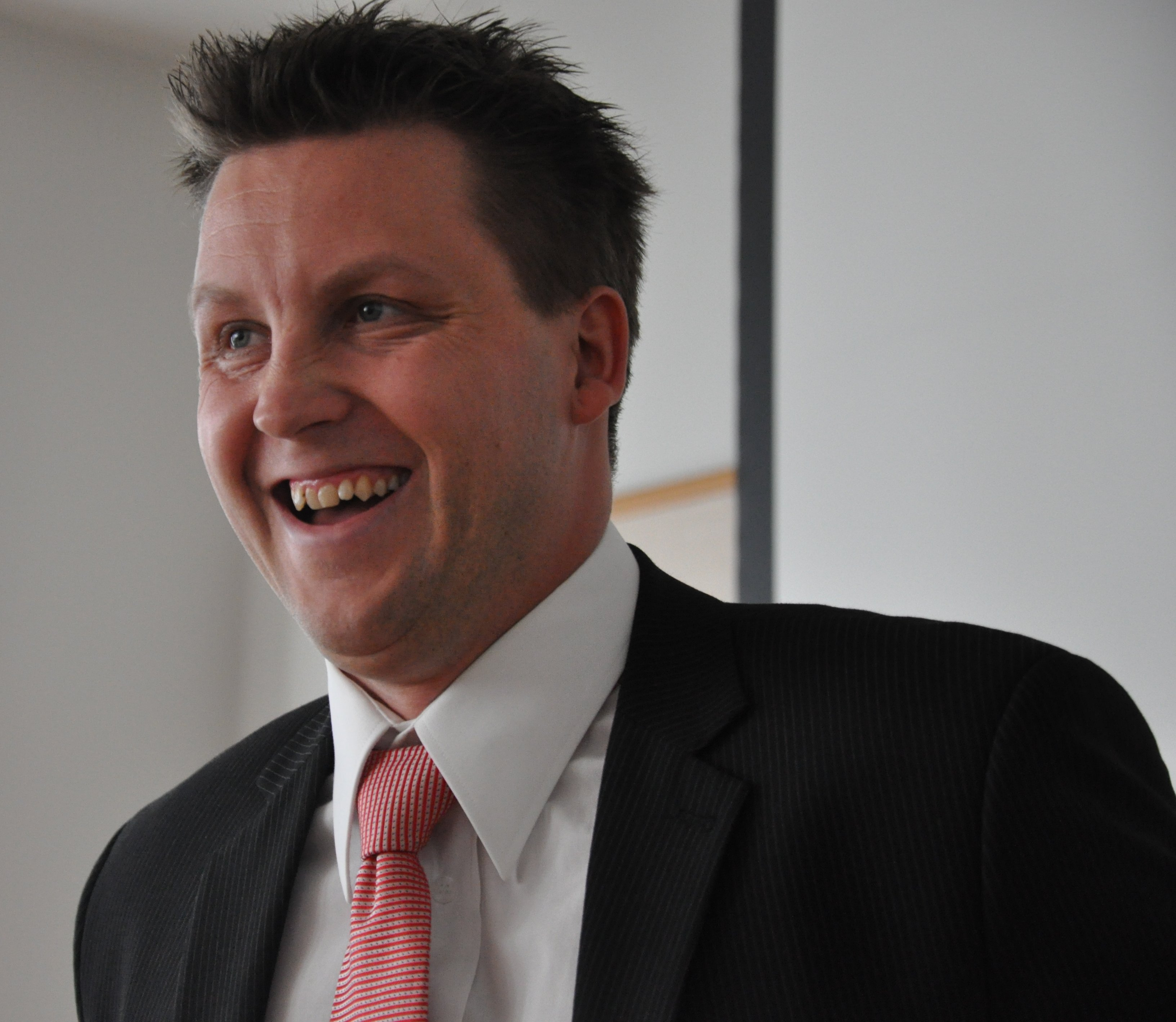
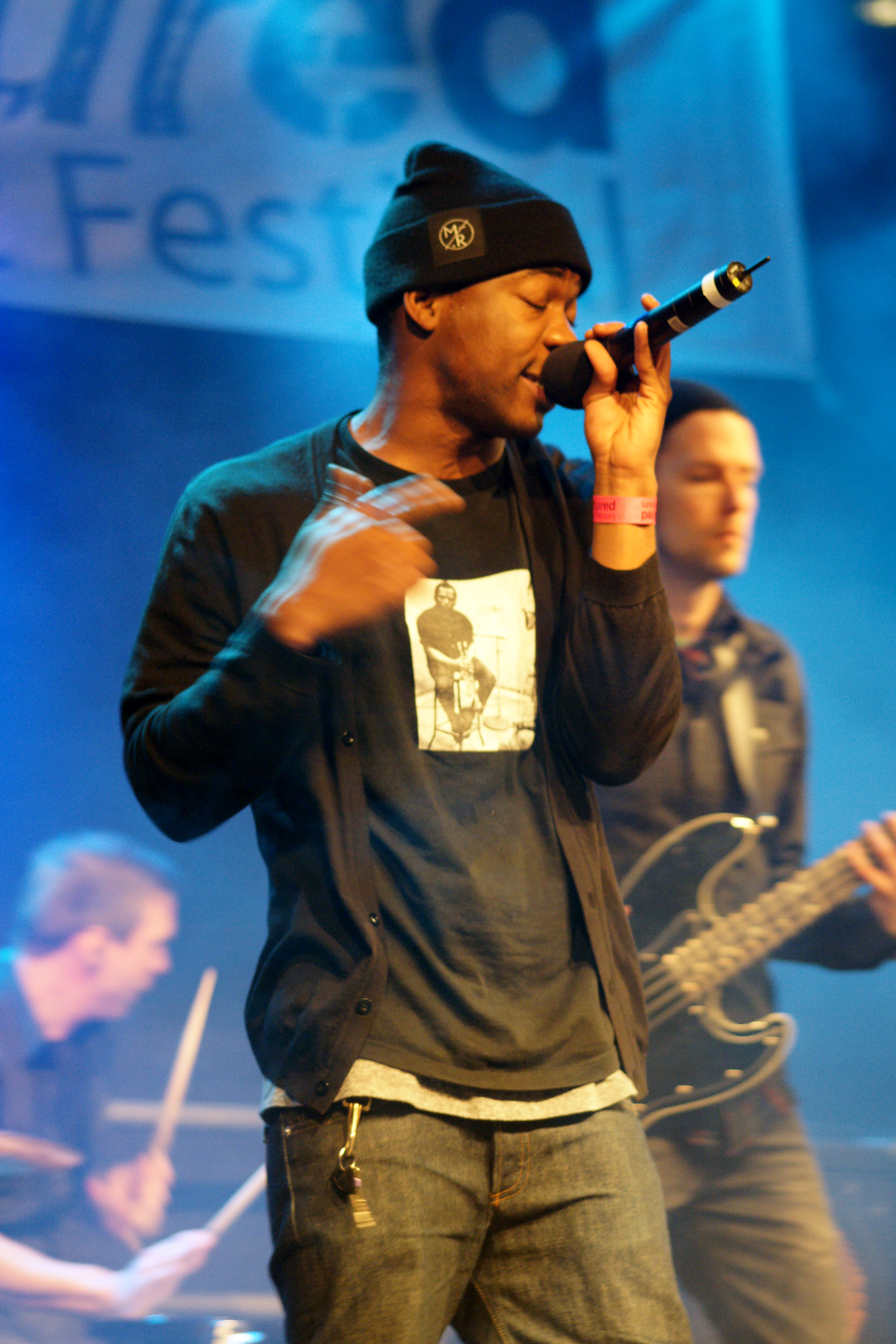
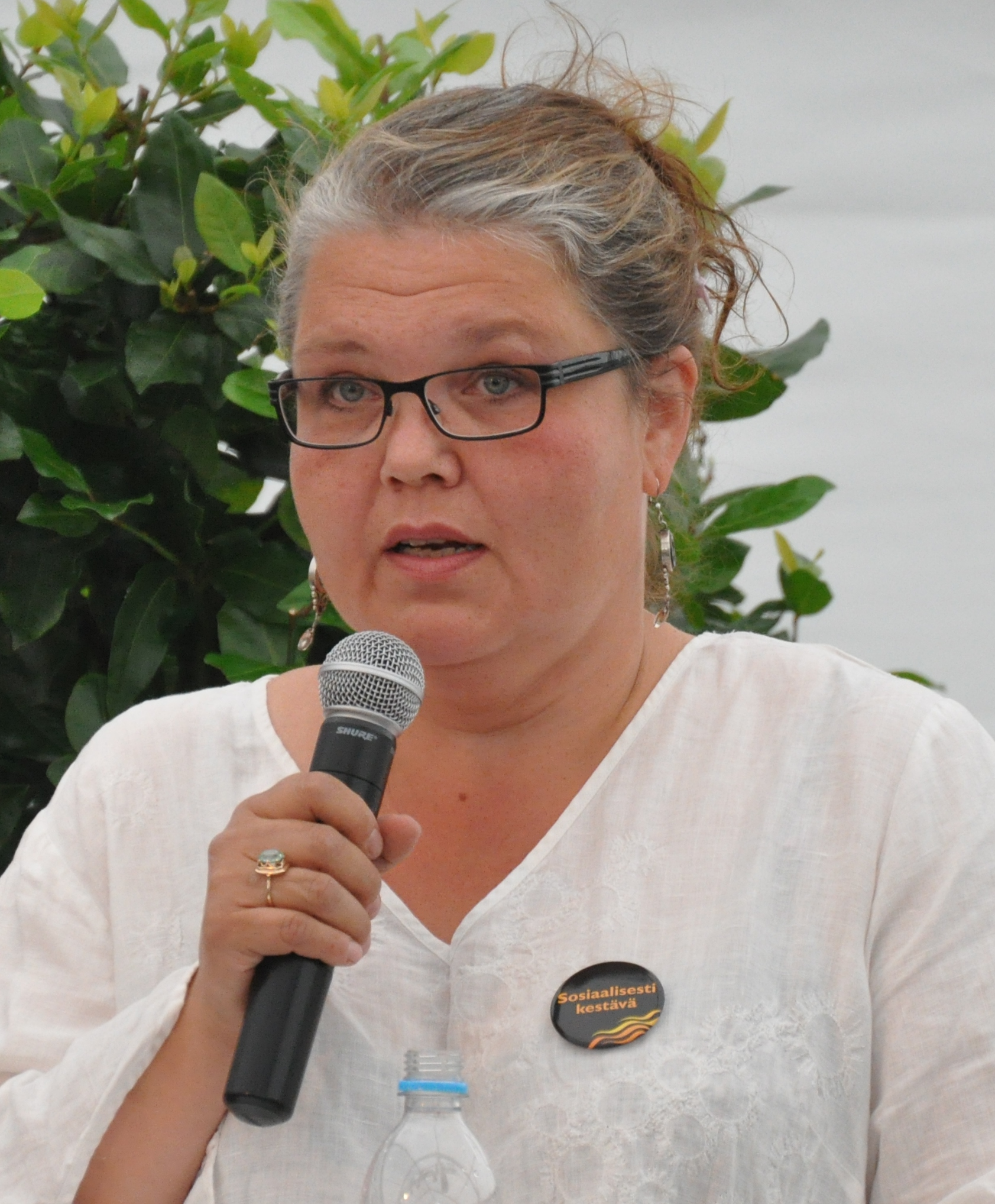
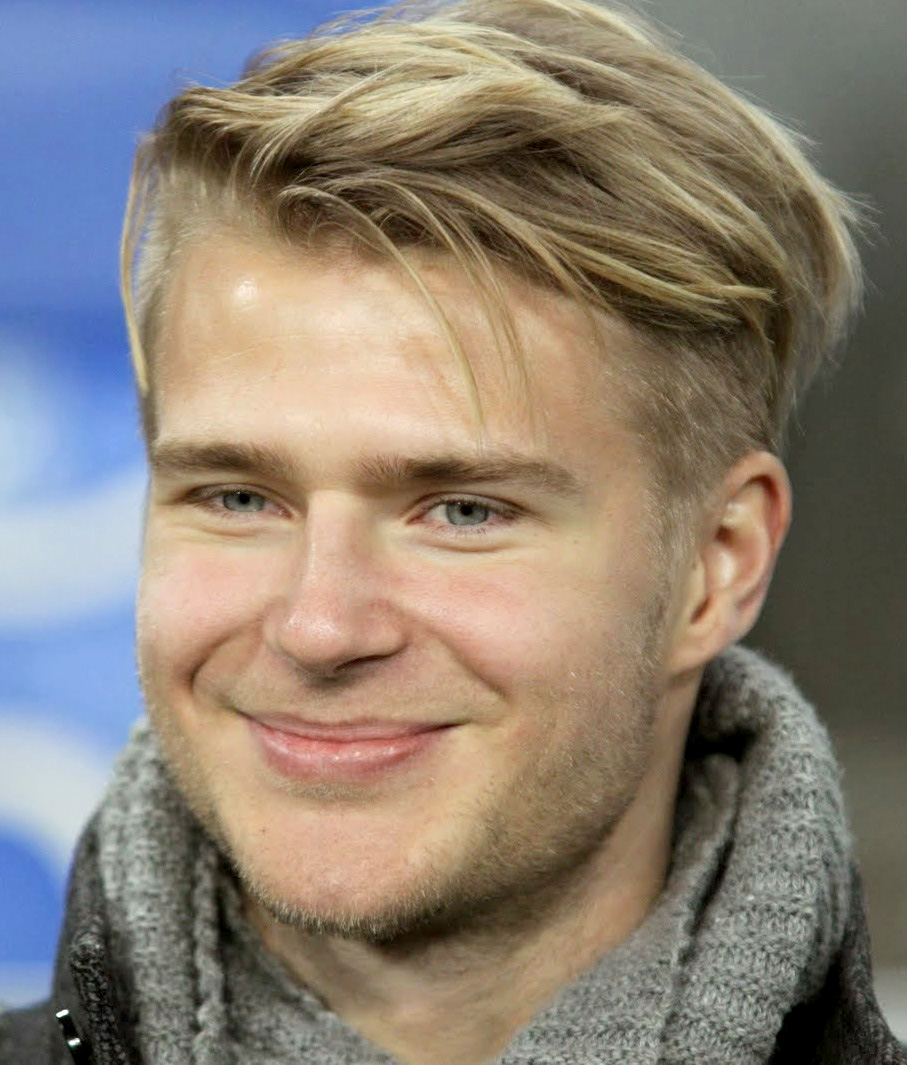
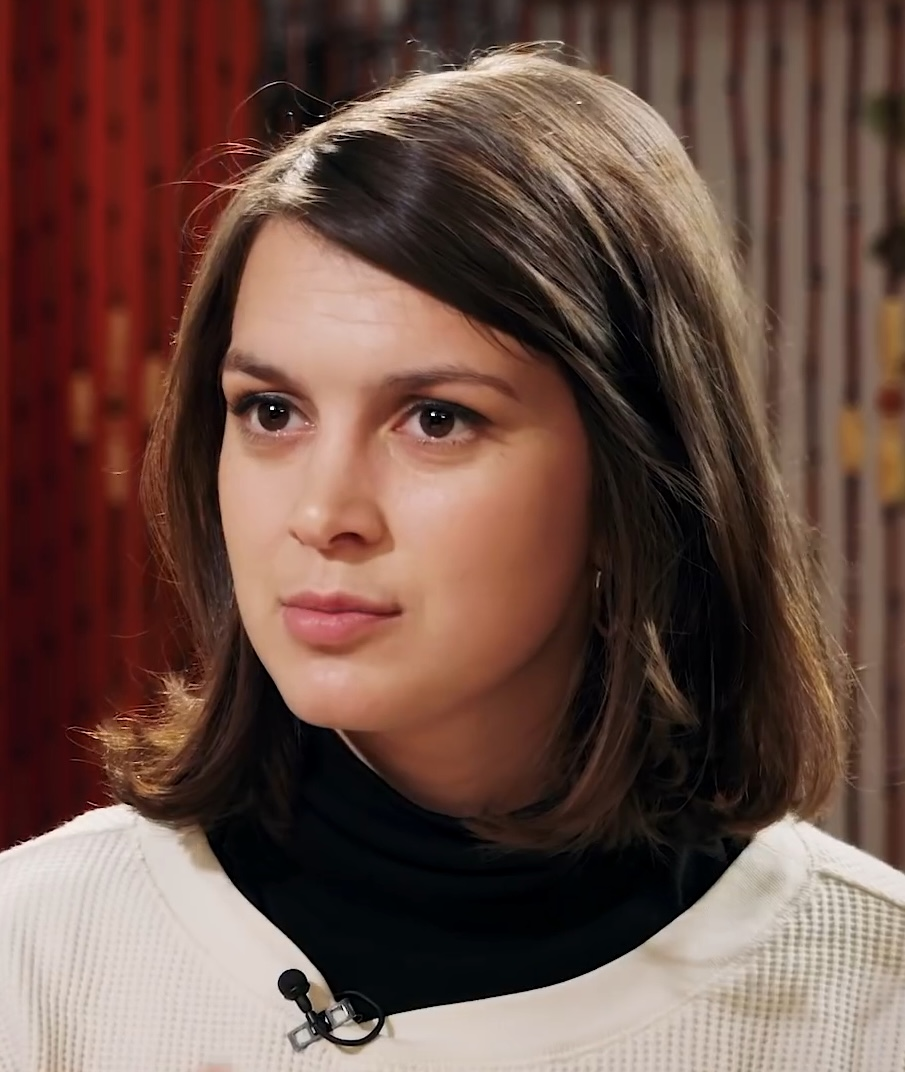
From left to right: Tuure Boelius, Jani Sievinen, Gracias Masomi, Kaarina Hazard, Paulus Arajuuri and Mimosa Willamo

Each team is composed of two individuals who have some type of relationship to each other. In the second season, there are 11 Finnish celebrity teams competing.

Contestants	Notability	Age	Relationship	Status
Aku Sipola	Actor	34	Friends	Eliminated 1st (in Kraków, Poland)
Wille Komulainen	–	42	Friends	Eliminated 1st (in Kraków, Poland)
Tuure Boelius	Artist	23	Siblings	Eliminated 2nd (in Kraków, Poland)
Saana Boelius	–	22	Siblings	Eliminated 2nd (in Kraków, Poland)
Jani Sievinen	Ex-medley swimmer	50	Married Couple	Eliminated 3rd (in Bucharest, Romania)
Maria Nyqvist	–	40	Married Couple	Eliminated 3rd (in Bucharest, Romania)
Mikko Kekäläinen	TV-presenter	47	Godson & Godmother	Medically removed (in Bucharest, Romania)
Mervi "Meikka" Levänen	–	65	Godson & Godmother	Medically removed (in Bucharest, Romania)
Tiina Reetta "Tinni" Wikström	Radio presenter on Radio Suomipop	34	Friends	Eliminated 5th (in Bogotá, Colombia)
Antti Savinainen	–	29	Friends	Eliminated 5th (in Bogotá, Colombia)
Deogracias "Gracias" Masomi	Rapper & actor	37	Friends	Eliminated 6th (in Cartagena, Colombia)
Jeremie Malolo	Ex-footballer	32	Friends	Eliminated 6th (in Cartagena, Colombia)
Leea Klemola	Actress & playwright	59	Friends	Eliminated 7th (in Panama City, Panama)
Kaarina Hazard	Actress	60	Friends	Eliminated 7th (in Panama City, Panama)
Paulus Arajuuri	Former football player for Huuhkajat	36	Siblings	Eliminated 8th (in San Isidro, Costa Rica)
Adeliina Arajuuri	Actress	32	Siblings	Eliminated 8th (in San Isidro, Costa Rica)
Elias Aalto	Entrepreneur & panellist on Lion's Den Finland	38	Brothers	Third place
Matias Pietilä	–	41	Brothers	Third place
Mimosa Willamo	Jussi Award-winning actress	29	Daughter & Father	Runners-up
Patrick "Pati" Willamo	–	55	Daughter & Father	Runners-up
Metti Forssell	Social media personality	33	Childhood Friends	Winners
Hanna Launonen	–	33	Childhood Friends	Winners

Future appearances

Tuure Boelius competed on the fourth season of Petolliset as a Traitor in 2025.

== Results ==
The following teams are listed with their placements in each leg. Placements are listed in finishing order.

- A red placement with a dagger (†) indicates that the team was eliminated.
- A blue placement with a double-dagger (‡) indicates that the team was the last to arrive at a Pit Stop in a non-elimination leg, and had to perform a Speed Bump task in the subsequent leg.
- A purple ε indicates that the team used an Express Pass on that leg to bypass one of their tasks.

Team placement (by leg)
Team	1	2	3 (Note: The third and fourth legs were combined to a "Super Leg", whereby all of the remaining teams were instructed to continue racing immediately after the third leg without a rest period.)	4	5	6	7	8	9	10	11	12
Metti & Hanna	2nd	1st	1st	3rd	1st	1st	3rd	3rd	3rd	2nd	2nd	1st
Mimosa & Pati	1st	2nd	2ndε (Note: Mimosa & Pati used their Express Pass to bypass the Roadblock.)	2nd	3rd	2nd	2nd	1st	1st	1st	3rd	2nd
Elias & Matias	3rd	4th	3rd	1st	2nd	3rd	1st	2nd	2nd	3rd	1st	3rd
Paulus & Adeliina	7th	5th	6th	7th‡	6th	4th	4th	4th	4th	4th‡	4th†	
Leea & Kaarina	6th	7th	8th (Note: Leea & Kaarina and Jani & Maria stepped onto the mat simultaneously; however, as Jani & Maria chose to quit the Roadblock, they received a two-hour penalty and were eliminated.)	5th	4th	6th‡	5th	5th‡	5th†			
Gracias & Jeremie	8th	3rd	4th	4th	5th	5th	6th†					
Tinni & Antti	4th	6th	5th	6th	7th†							
Mikko & Meikka	9th	9th	7th	8th† (Note: Mikko & Meikka elected to withdraw from the race due to Meikka's leg strain.)								
Jani & Maria	5th	8th	9th†									
Tuure & Saana	10th	10th†										
Aku & Wille	11th†											

== Race summary ==
Destinations	Air travel Rail travel Water travel Bus travel Helicopter travel Bicycle travel Gondola travel
Route Markers	Kiertotie (Detour) Tiesulku (Roadblock) Express–Passi (Express Pass); Hidaste (Speed Bump) Etapin päätepiste (Pit Stop)

=== Leg 1 (Finland → Poland) ===
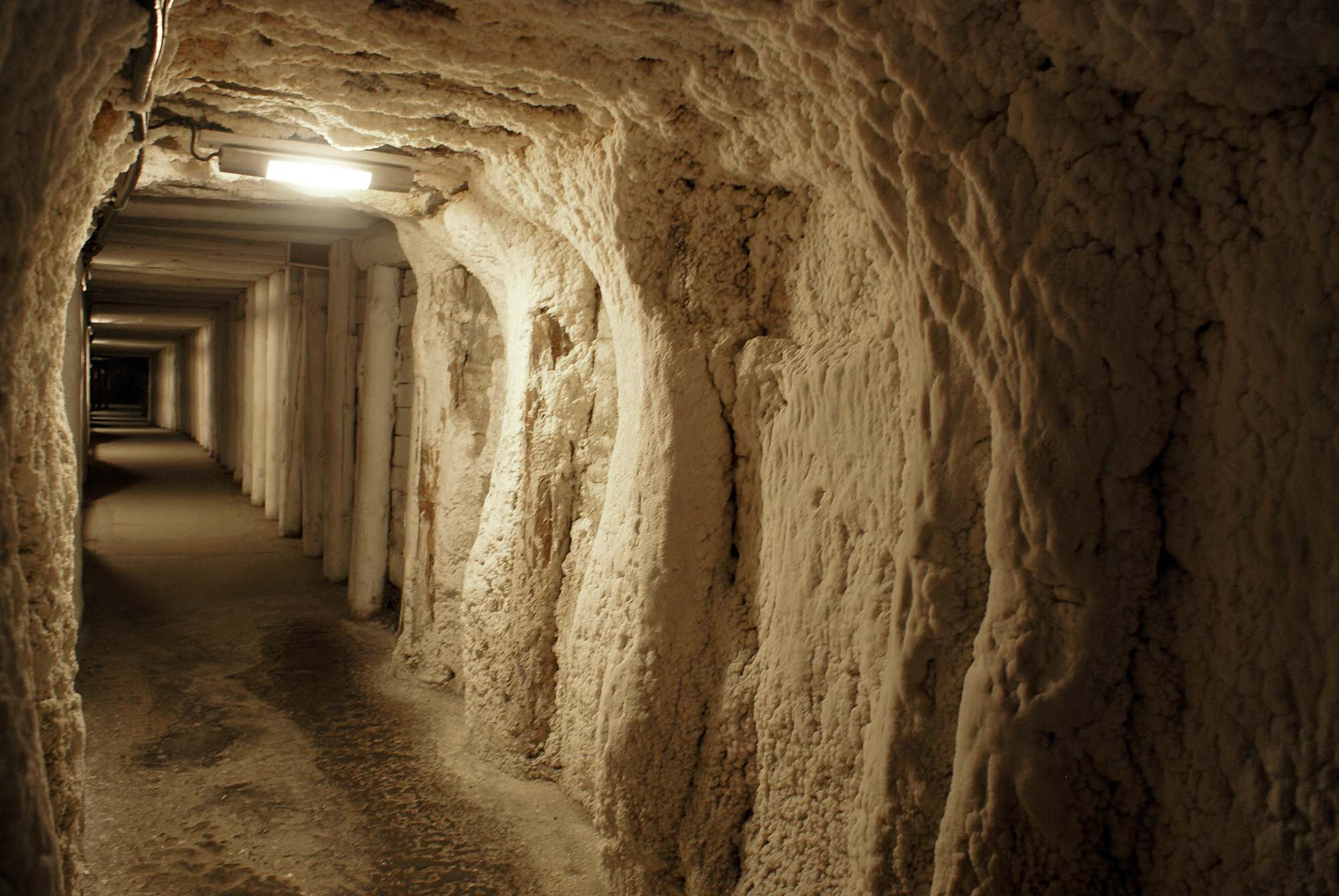
The first leg of the season visited the Wieliczka Salt Mine in the town of Wieliczka, Poland.

- Episode 1: "The Race Begins Now" / "Kilpailu alkaa nyt" (5 October 2024)
- Prize: The Express Pass (awarded to Mimosa & Pati)
- Eliminated: Aku & Wille

Locations

- Vantaa, Finland (Tikkurila – Heureka Science Center) (Starting Line)
- Helsinki (Helsinki–Vantaa Airport) → Kraków, Poland (Kraków John Paul II International Airport)
- Kraków (Henryk Reyman Municipal Stadium)
- Wieliczka (Wieliczka Salt Mine)
- Kraków (St. Mary Magdalene Square – Piotr Skarga Monument)
- Kraków (Błonia Meadow)
- Kraków (ZPiT AGH "Krakus" (in Polish) or Henryk Jordan Park)
- Kraków (Wawel Hill – Wawel Dragon Statue)
- Kraków (Wisla River Bank)

Episode summary

- Teams set off from outside Heurekas Science Center in Tikkurila, Vantaa and had to search under 100 buckets for a red and yellow block. Teams then had to unscramble several letters until they formed the first international destination: Kraków, Poland. Once there, teams were released at Henryk Reyman Municipal Stadium in the order that they arrived at the airport and found their next clue: a postcard of the Wieliczka Salt Mine. Teams had to travel to the mine, descend 1,000 feet (300 m) and find the diamond of Casimir III the Great from a salt rock pile before receiving their next clue.
- In this season's first Roadblock, one team member had to balance a stack of books on top of their head while holding a feather in their hand for ten minutes before receiving their next clue.
- After the Roadblock, teams had to travel by tram to the Błonia Meadow and find their next clue.
- This season's first Detour was a choice between Polka (Polkka) or Block (Pölkky). In Polka, teams had to perform a traditional Polish polka dance to the judge before receiving their clue. In Block, teams had to saw off a block of wood from a mark using a two-man saw before receiving their clue.
- After the Detour, teams had to travel to the Wawel Dragon Statue and search for the Pit Stop: the Wisla River Bank outside of the Manggha Museum of Japanese Art and Technology.

=== Leg 2 (Poland) ===
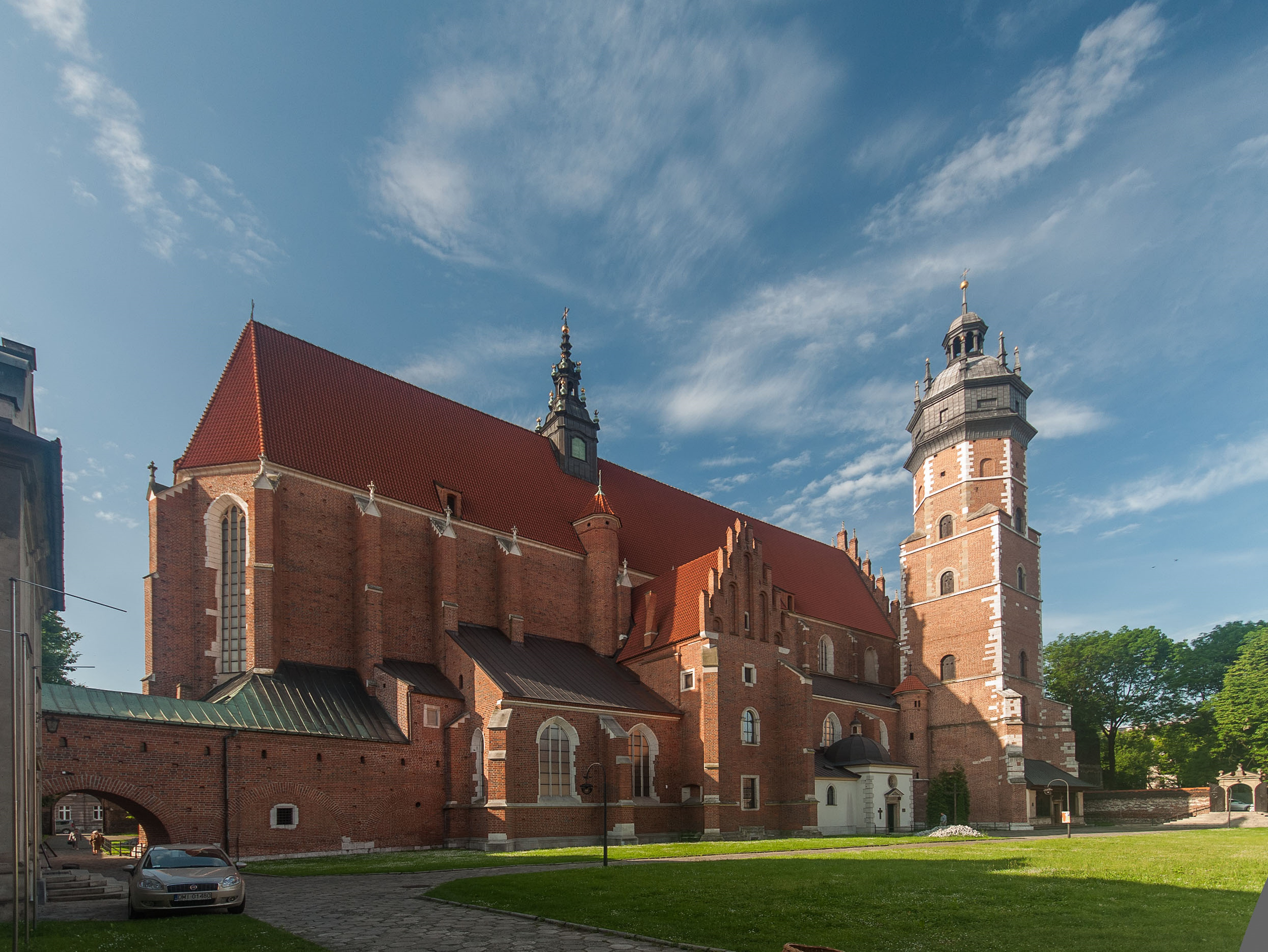
The second leg finished outside of the Corpus Christi Basilica in Kraków.

- Episode 2: "New Set Ups" / "Asetelmat uusiksi" (12 October 2024) (Note: This episode was released one week early for purchase on Ruutu+.)
- Eliminated: Tuure & Saana

Locations

- Kraków (AC Hotel by Marriott Krakow)
- Kraków (Father Bernatek Bridge (in Polish))
- Kraków (Kraków Barbican)
- Kraków (Old Town – St. Mary's Basilica)
- Kraków (Old Town – Kraków Cloth Hall or Little Market Square)
- Kraków (Old Town – Plac Nowy (in Polish))
- Kraków (Wolf Popper Synagogue & Klezmer-Hois)
- Kraków (Corpus Christi Basilica)

Episode summary

- At the start of this leg, teams were instructed to find their next clue at the Father Bernatek Bridge. Teams then had to travel to the Kraków Barbican, find a wooden puzzle and solve it by forming a cube before receiving their next clue: a photograph of St. Mary's Basilica.
- This leg's Detour was a choice between Faces (Kasvot) or Beater Car (Koslat). In Face, teams had to count the number of faces on the Kraków Cloth Hall (110) before receiving their next clue. In Beater Car, teams had to convince locals to lift and turn a Fiat 126 around and then squeeze into the car for 20 seconds before receiving their next clue.
- After the Detour, teams had to travel to Plac Nowy and find a obwarzanek krakowski stand with their next clue.
- In this Roadblock, one team member had to choose a restaurant order of Jewish cuisine, pick out the correct items from a vast spread at the Wolf Popper Synagogue and deliver them to the Klezmer-Hois before receiving their next clue, which directed them to the Pit Stop: the Corpus Christi Basilica.

=== Leg 3 (Poland → Romania) ===
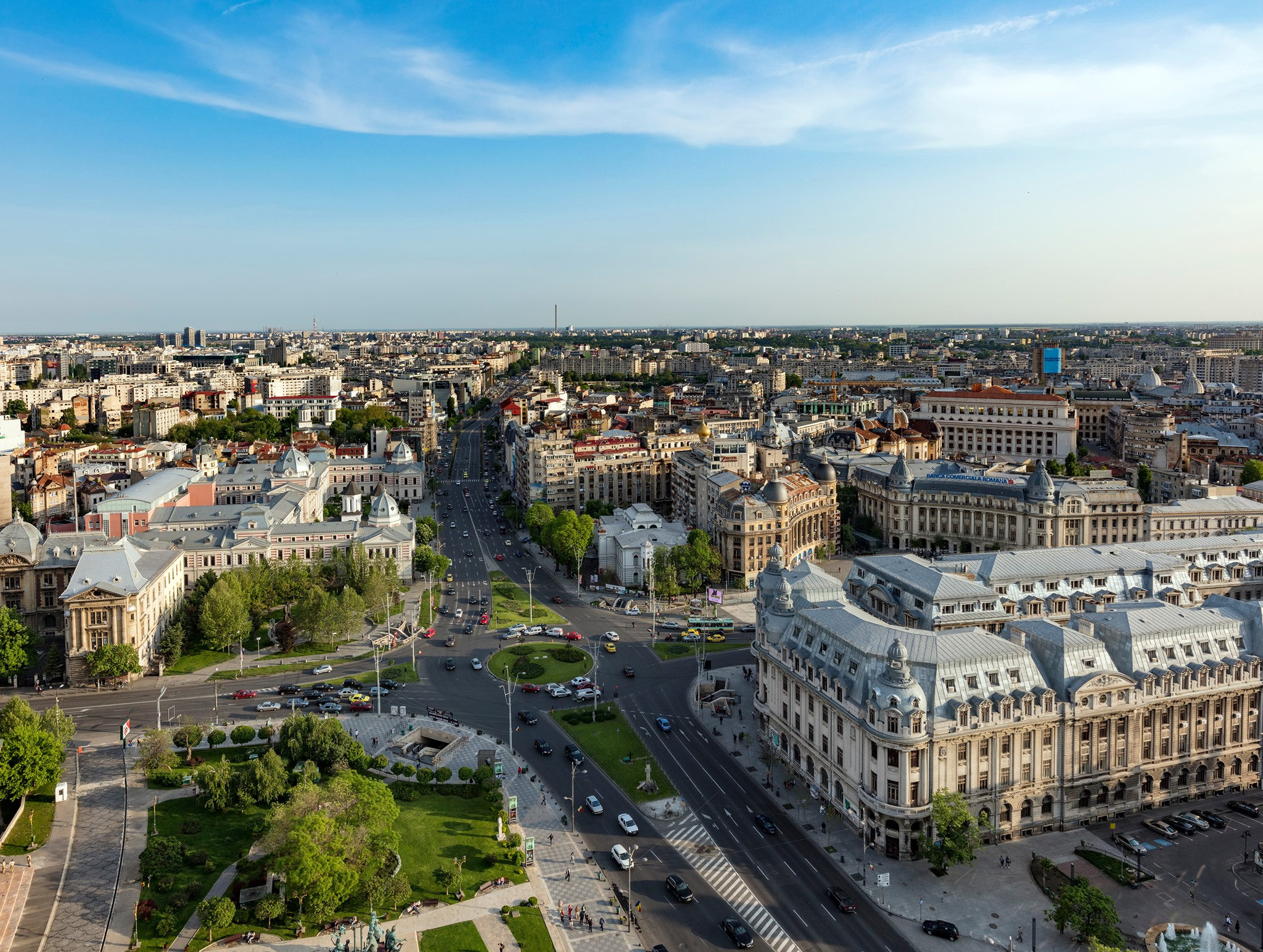
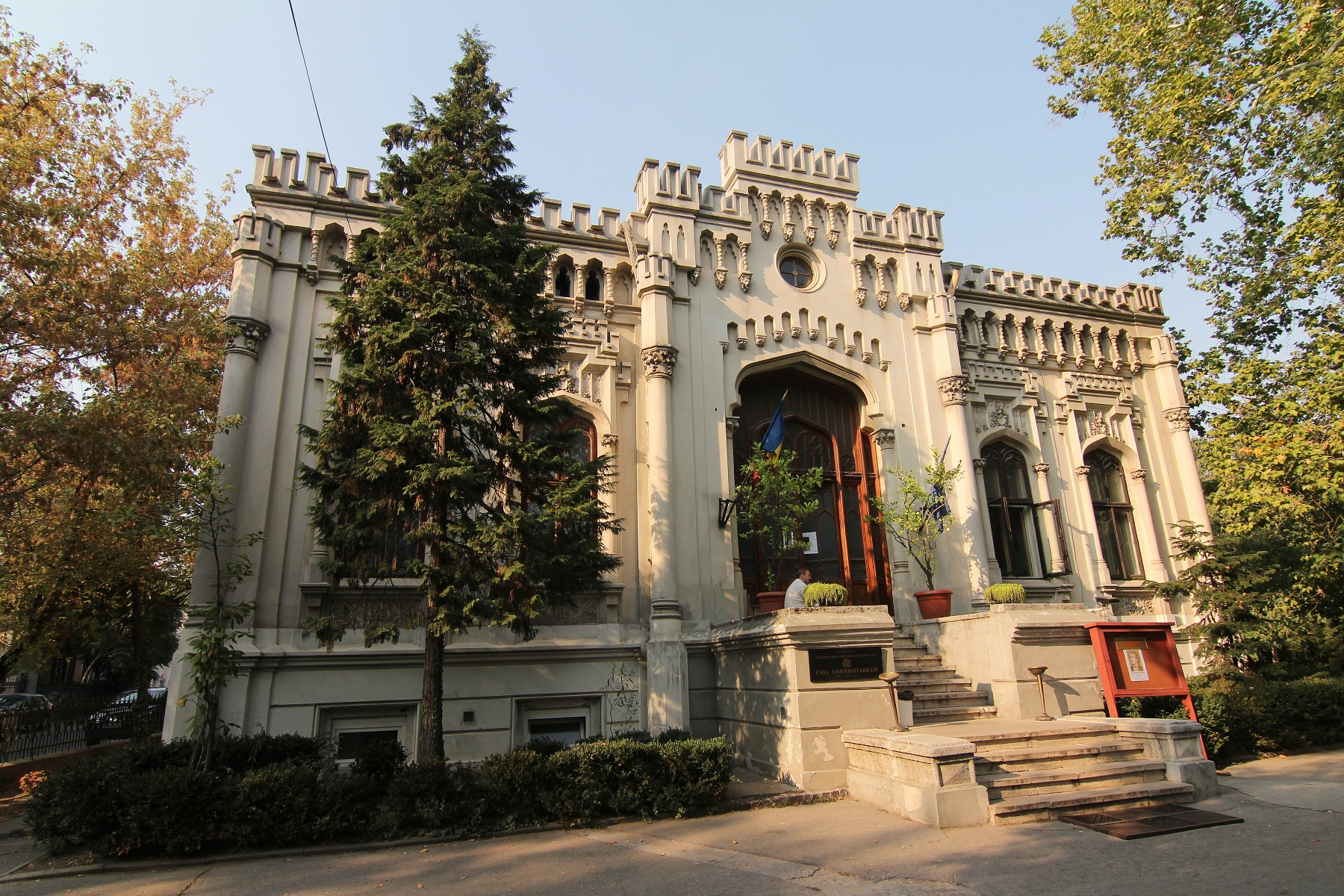
Teams visited either the University Square or the University House in Bucharest for their first leg in Romania.
- Episode 3: "Tough Decisions at Cooking School" / "Kovia päätöksiä kokkikoulussa" (19 October 2024)
- Eliminated: Jani & Maria

Locations

- Kraków (Hyatt Place Krakow)
- Kraków (Kraków John Paul II International Airport) → Bucharest, Romania (Bucharest Henri Coandă International Airport)
- Bucharest (Ramada Plaza by Wyndham Bucharest)
- Bucharest (Revolution Square – Iuliu Maniu Monument (in Romanian))
- Bucharest (University Square or University House)
- Bucharest (Horeca Culinary School)
- Bucharest (Sala Gimnastică Mariana Bitang Dinamo)
- Bucharest (Carol Park)

Episode summary

- At the start of this leg, teams were instructed to fly to Bucharest, Romania. Once there, teams were released in the order that they finished the previous leg and had to find their next clue at the Iuliu Maniu Monument.
- This leg's Detour was a choice between Melodie (Suulaat Sävelet) or Quill Symphony (Sulkakynä Sinfonia). In Melodies, teams had to perform the song "Bun îi vinul ghiurghiuliu" ("Good is the red rose wine") in Romanian before receiving their next clue. In Quill Symphony, teams had to transcribe the musical notes of "Bun îi vinul ghiurghiuliu" onto a piece of sheet music using dip pens and then have a pianist play it before receiving their next clue.
- After the Detour, teams had to travel to the Horeca Culinary School and prepare two Romanian dishes – creier pane and ram testicles – before receiving their next clue.
- In this leg's Roadblock, one team member had to eat the food that they prepared before receiving their next clue.
  - Mimosa & Pati used their Express Pass to bypass this Roadblock.
- After the Roadblock, teams had to travel to the Mariana Bitang gymnastics school and perform a gymnastics routine of ribbons and floor exercises before receiving their next clue, which directed them to the Pit Stop: Carol Park.

Additional notes

- Although the last team to arrive at the Pit Stop was eliminated, there was no rest period at the end of the leg and all remaining teams were instead instructed to continue racing.
- Jani & Maria elected to quit the Roadblock and receive a two-hour penalty, upon arriving at the Pit Stop.

=== Leg 4 (Romania) ===
The second part of the Super Leg finished in front of the People's House.

- Episode 4: "Dramatic Night" / "Dramaattinen ilta" (26 October 2024)
- Prize: A vacation at the Sokos Hotel Koli in Koli National Park (awarded to Elias & Matias)
- Medically removed: Mikko & Meikka

Locations

- Bucharest (Carol Park)
- Bucharest (Librăria Cărturești Carusel)
- Bucharest (Battery 1-2)
- Bucharest (Carol Park – Arenele Romane (in Romanian))
- Bucharest (People's House)

Episode summary

- At the start of this leg, teams were instructed to travel to Librăria Cărturești Carusel. There, they had to replicate a book shelf by setting provided books on a self in the same order with teams tied together by their wrists before receiving their next clue.
- Teams then had to travel to Battery 1-2 and take part in tasks related to the Romanian horror character Count Dracula. One team member had to lock themselves into a coffin, while the other person had to solve a mathematical equation to unlock the coffin. Team members then had to drink a shot of red liquid before receiving their next clue, which directed them to Arenele Romane.
- This leg's Detour was a choice between Yarn (Lanka) or Needle (Neula). In Yarn, both team members had to manually spin yarn until they reached a required length before receiving their next clue. In Needle, both team members had to replicate a cross-stitch pattern before receiving their next clue.
- After the Detour, teams had to check in at the Pit Stop: the People's House.

Additional note

- Mikko & Meikka decided to withdraw from the competition following a medical examination of Meikka's leg strain.
- This was a non-elimination leg.

=== Leg 5 (Romania → Colombia) ===
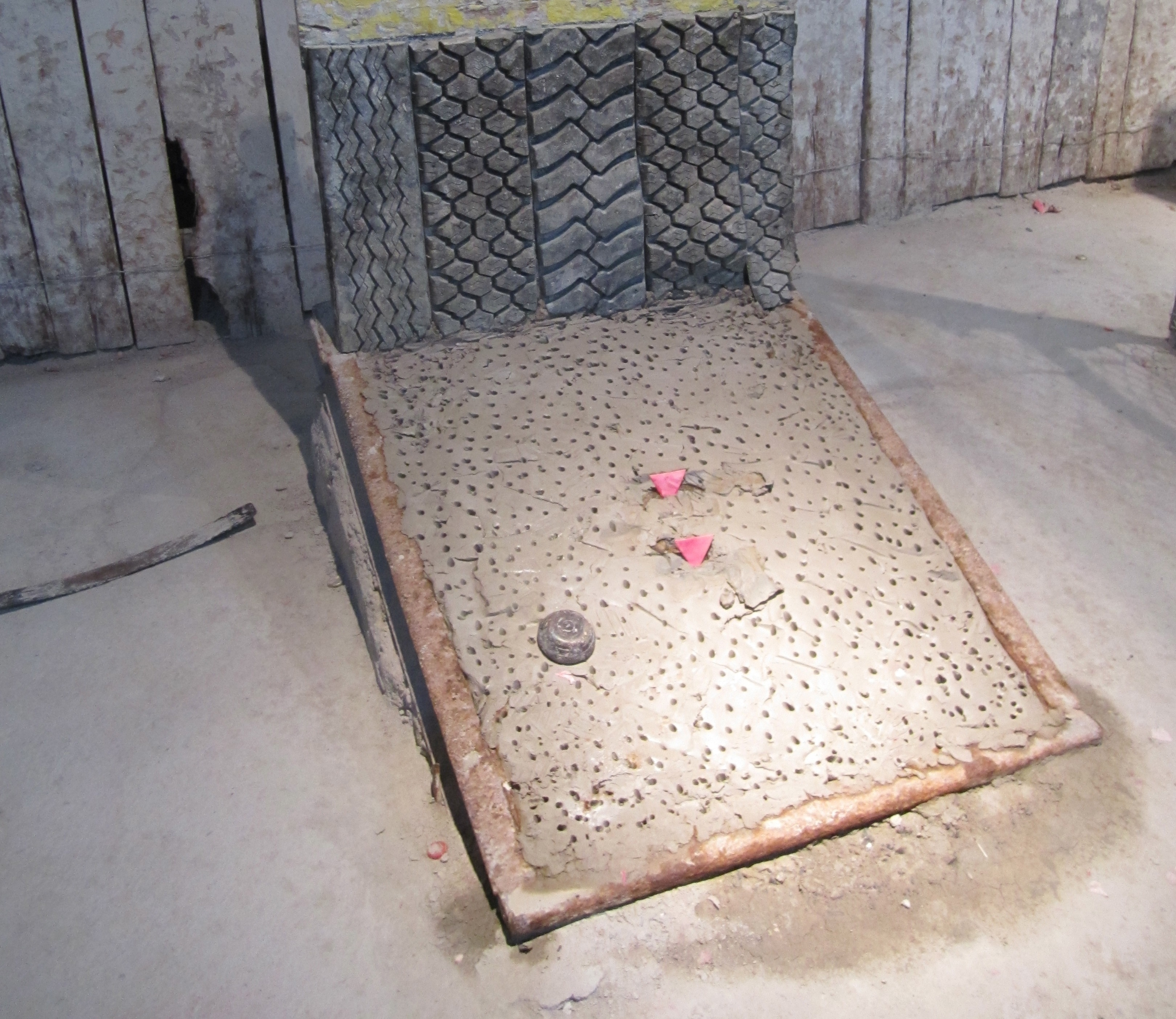
While in Bogotá, teams had to play tejo for the "Firecracker" Detour option.

- Episode 5: "Whistling Vocals" / "Viheliäät vuorosanat" (2 November 2024)
- Eliminated: Tinni & Antti

Locations

- Bucharest (Crowne Plaza Bucharest)
- Bucharest (Bucharest Henri Coandă International Airport) → Bogotá, Colombia (El Dorado International Airport)
- Bogotá (Parque Ciudad Salitre Occidental)
  - Bogotá (Nissi Bike Store)
- Bogotá (Calle 76 – Marquetería El Triángulo)
- Bogotá (Parque La Araña or Club De Tejo La 76)
- Bogotá (Plaza de Mercado 7 de Agosto)
- Bogotá (Barrio Palermo – Diagonal 46 #20-23)
- Bogotá (Parque Virgilio Barco)

Episode summary

- At the start of this leg, teams were instructed to travel to Bogotá, Colombia. Once there, teams were released at Parque Ciudad Salitre Occidental in the order that they finished the previous leg and had to find their next clue at the Marquetería El Triángulo.
- For their Speed Bump, Paulus & Adeliina had to refurbish a children's bike, by refilling the tyres and adding some child-themed decoration, before they could continue racing.
- This leg's Detour was a choice between Poor Coffee (Sumppi) or Firecracker (Sähikäinen). In Poor Coffee, teams had to search a bag of coffee beans for ones with tiny letters and unscramble the word KAHVI (Coffee) before receiving their next clue. In Firecracker, teams had to play a traditional Colombian game of tejo, which involved both team members tossing a metal disc onto a gunpowder target before receiving their next clue.
- In this leg's Roadblock, one team member had to throw a die and eat the corresponding number of local chili peppers before receiving their next clue.
- After the Roadblock, teams had to travel to Barrio Palermo, learn a Colombian Spanish script for a telenovela scene with racers performing the characters of Pedro and Guillermo and perform it in front of a director before receiving their next clue, which directed them to the Pit Stop: Parque Virgilio Barco.

=== Leg 6 (Colombia) ===
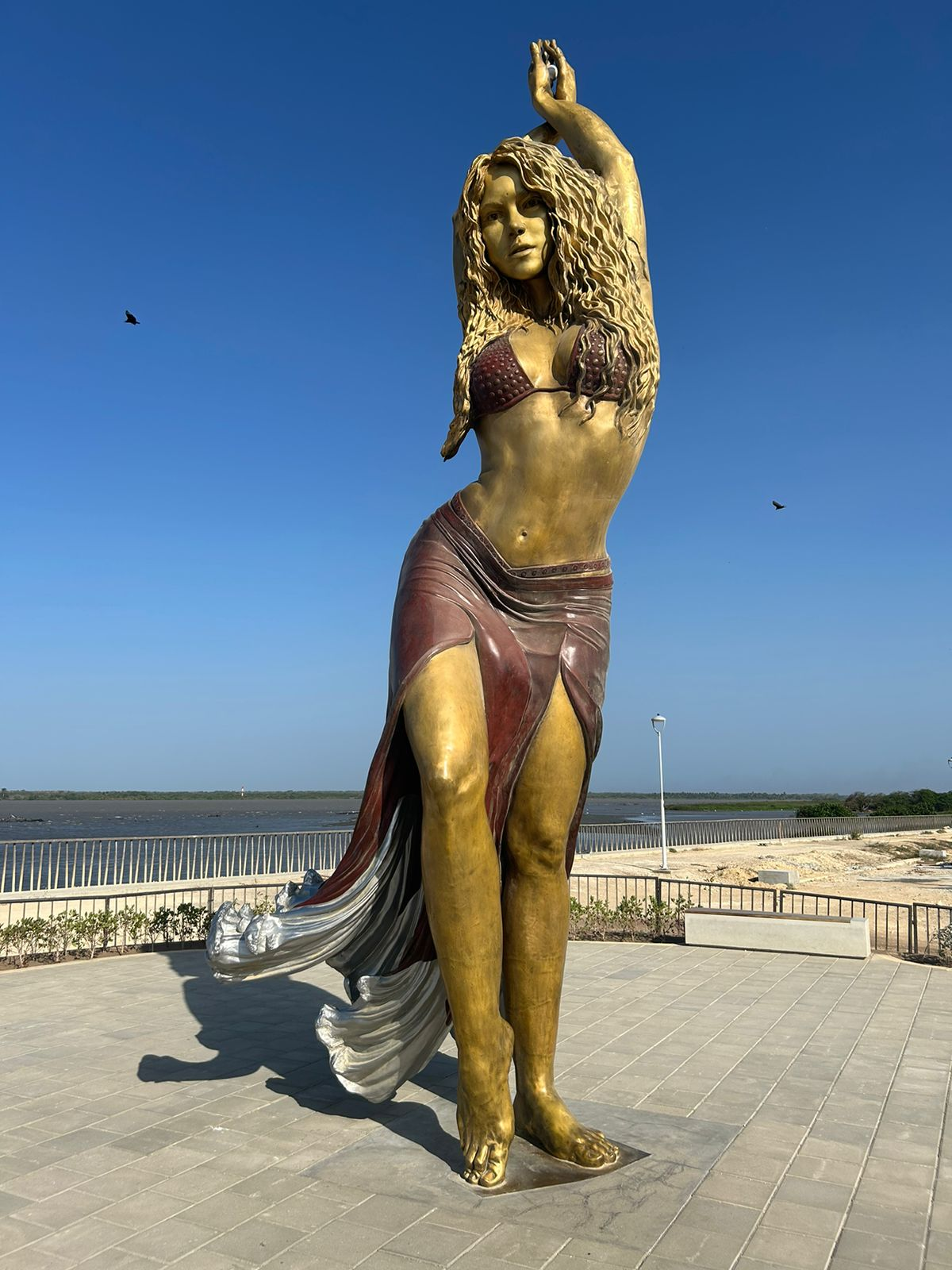
During their sixth leg, teams had to find the Statue of Shakira at Gran Malecón in Barranquilla.

- Episode 6: "Searching For the Lost Hips" / "Kadonneita lanteita metsästämässä" (9 November 2024)

Locations

- Bogotá (Bogotá Marriott Hotel)
- Bogotá (El Dorado International Airport) → Barranquilla (Ernesto Cortissoz International Airport)
- Barranquilla (Hotel Movich Buró 51)
- Barranquilla (Gran Malecón (in Spanish) – Statue of Shakira)
- Barranquilla (Barrio Las Flores (in Spanish))
- Barranquilla (Plaza de la Paz – Teatrino)
- Barranquilla (Estadio Édgar Rentería)
- Barranquilla (Casa del Carnaval (in Spanish) or Plaza de la Aduana (in Spanish))
- Barranquilla (Plaza de la Paz)

Episode summary

- At the start of this leg, teams were instructed to fly to Barranquilla. Once there, teams were released at the Hotel Movich Buró 51 in the order that they finished the previous leg and were instructed to travel to the Gran Malecón and find their next clue at the Statue of Shakira based only off of the hint of "Whose hips don't lie?".
- Teams were instructed to travel to Barrio Las Flores. There, teams had to search the neighborhood on a pedicab for a marked house and paint it before receiving their next clue. Teams then had to travel to the teatrino in Plaza de la Paz and perform a Colombian-style salsa dance before receiving their next clue, which directed them to Estadio Édgar Rentería.
- This leg's Detour was a choice between Flowers (Kukat) or Decorations (Koristeet), each with a limit of three stations. In Flowers, teams had to assemble a Barranquilla Carnival "Congo" headdress and then apply face paint before receiving their next clue. In Decorations, teams had to fully decorate a tuk-tuk for Carnival before receiving their next clue.
- After the Detour, teams had to check in at the Pit Stop: Plaza de la Paz.

Additional note

- This was a non-elimination leg.

=== Leg 7 (Colombia) ===
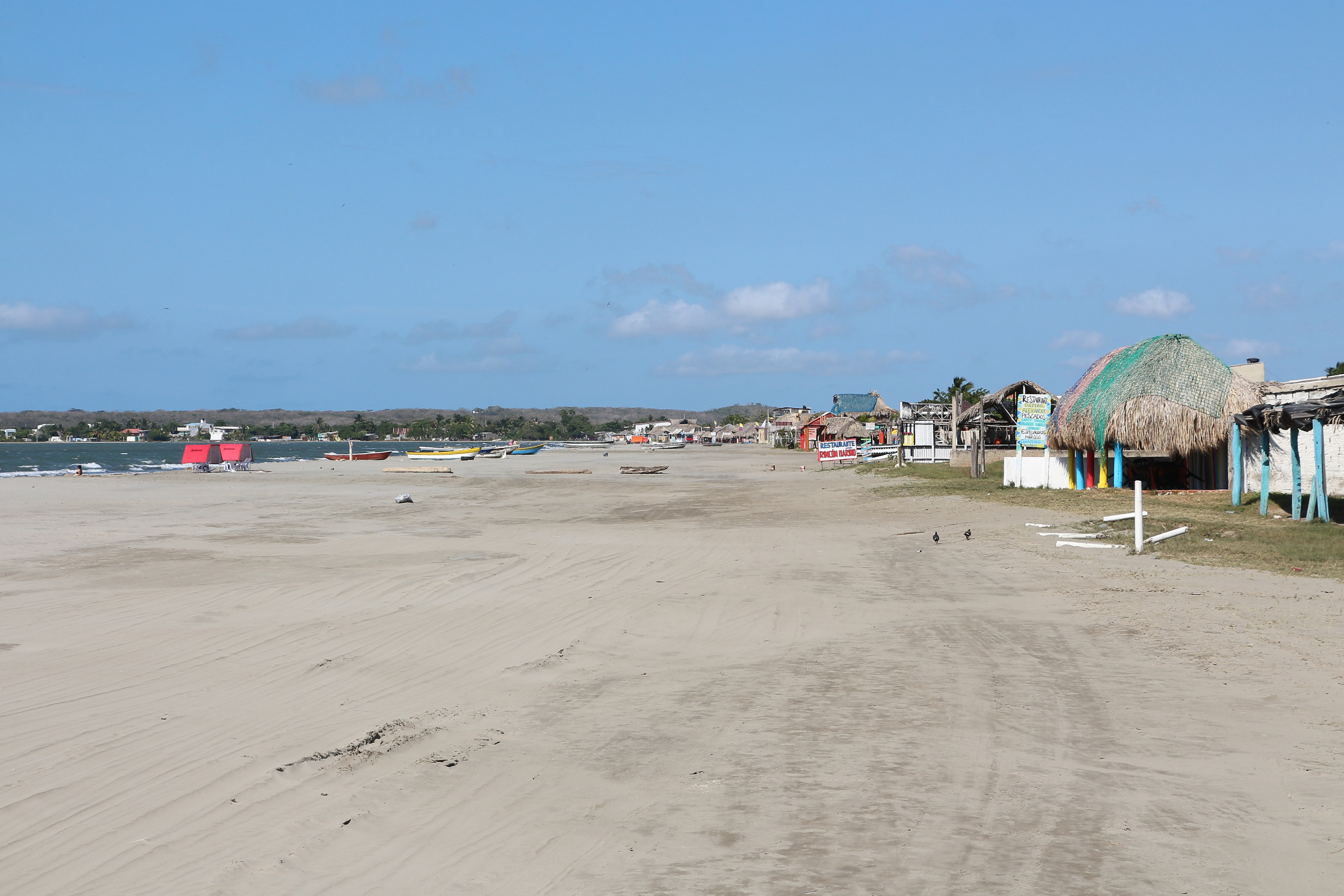
The Roadblock for this leg involved searching through sandcastles on Playa Azul La Boquilla in Cartagena.

- Episode 7: "Some Cake Too" / "Kakkua kanssa" (16 November 2024)
- Prize: An Elämyslahjat gift card (awarded to Elias & Matias)
- Eliminated: Gracias & Jeremie

Locations

- Barranquilla (Hotel Movich Buró 51)
- Barranquilla (Hotel Movich Buró 51) → Cartagena (GHL Relax Corales de Indias Hotel)
- Cartagena (Ecotours Boquilla)
- Cartagena (Playa Azul La Boquilla)
- Cartagena (Casa Museo Rafael Núñez)
- Cartagena (Plaza Bolívar, Iglesia de San Pedro Claver, Plaza de Santo Domingo, Plaza Fernández Madrid, Teatro Adolfo Mejia & Plaza de los Coches)
- Cartagena (Castillo San Felipe de Barajas)

Episode summary

- At the start of this leg, teams were instructed to travel by bus to Cartagena. Once there, teams were released from the GHL Relax Corales de Indias Hotel in the order that they finished the previous leg.
- For their Speed Bump, Leea & Kaarina had to make a bed and fold two towel swans before they could continue racing.
- Teams had to travel by taxi to Ecotours Boquilla, which had their next clue. Teams then had to paddle a boat into the estuary and deliver mangrove seedlings to a marked boat before receiving a golden bird, which they could exchange their next clue.
- In this leg's Roadblock, one team member had to search among hundreds of sandcastles for one with a mask buried inside it that they could exchange for their next clue. If a sandcastle didn't have a mask, racers had to rebuild it before they could search another.
- After the Roadblock, teams had to travel to Casa Museo Rafael Núñez and perform an Afro-Colombian drum routine before receiving their next clue. Teams then had to travel to Plaza Bolívar, ask for a camera from a palenquera in Spanish and photograph themselves with five specific statues before receiving their next clue, which directed them to the Pit Stop: Castillo San Felipe de Barajas.

=== Leg 8 (Colombia → Panama) ===
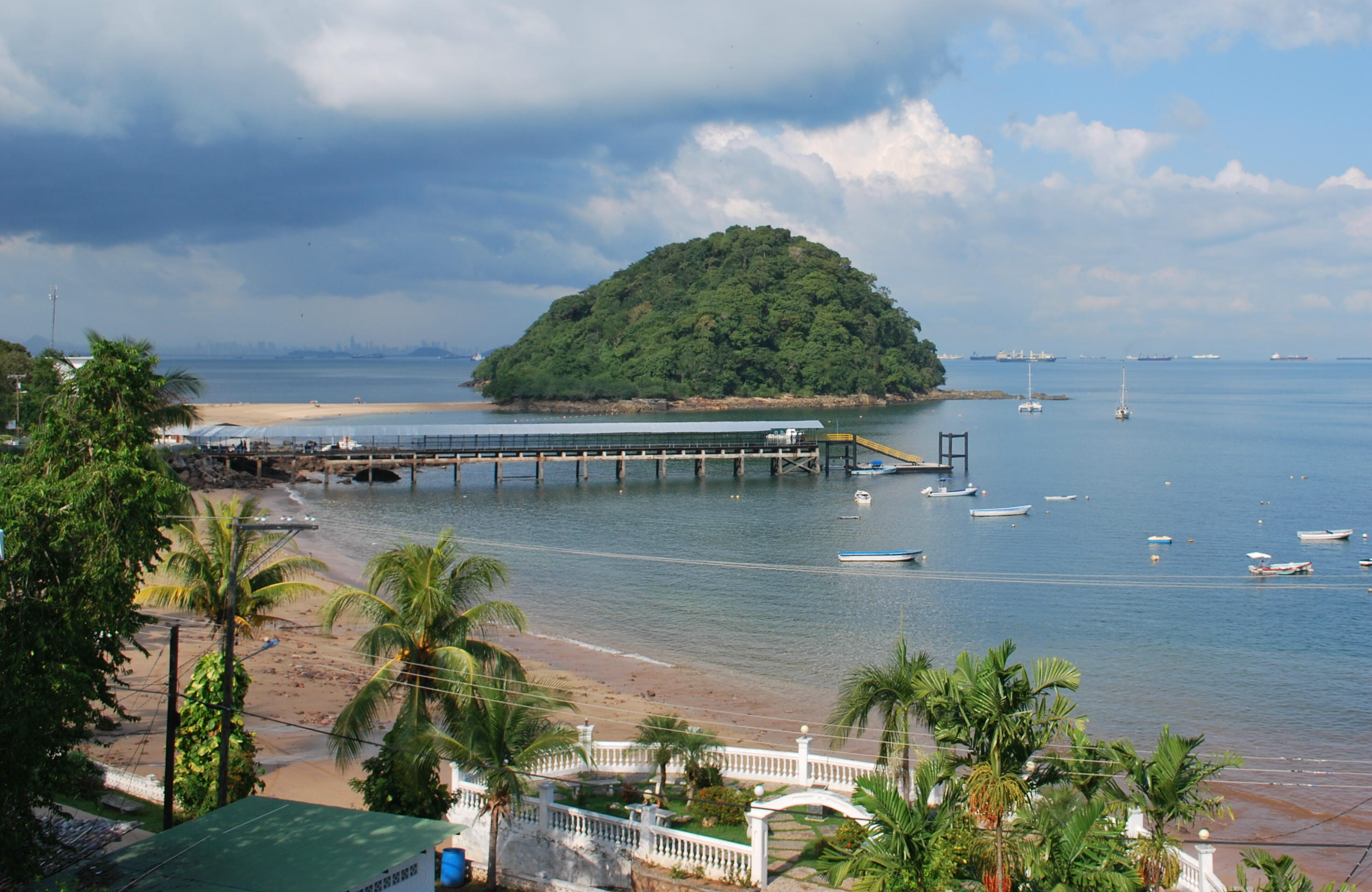
The eighth leg visited Taboga Island off of the Pacific coast of Panama.

- Episode 8: "An Island Without Cars" / "Saari ilman autoja" (23 November 2024)

Locations

- Cartagena (GHL Relax Corales de Indias Hotel)
- Cartagena (Rafael Núñez International Airport) → Panama City, Panama (Tocumen International Airport)
- Panama City (Aloft Panamá)
- Panama City (Causeway Islands Ferry Terminal) → Taboga Island (Muelle de Taboga Hernando de Luque)
- Taboga Island (Parador Fotográfico Taboga)
- Taboga Island (Playa La Restinga)
- Taboga Island (Calle Francisco Pizarro)
- Taboga Island (Playa Honda, Boti Family Home & Playita Aspin)
- Taboga Island (Muelle de Taboga Hernando de Luque) → Panama City (Causeway Islands Ferry Terminal)
- Panama City (Poin Panamá)
- Panama City (Biomuseo)
- Panama City (Cinta Costera – Mirador del Pacífico)

Episode summary

- At the start of this leg, teams were instructed to fly to Panama City, Panama. Once there, teams were released from Aloft Panamá in the order that they finished the previous leg and had to travel by ferry to Taboga Island, where they found their next clue.
- This leg's Detour was a choice between Coins (Kolikot) or Ropes (Köysi), each with a limit of three stations. In Coins, teams had to unearth five Amazing Race Suomi coins from a marked section of beach before receiving their next clue. In Ropes, teams had to pull a treasure chest to shore and untie all of the knots on the rope before receiving their next clue.
- In this leg's first Roadblock, one team member had to thread a beaded wini bracelet before receiving their next clue.
- After the first Roadblock, teams had to find a sailfish statue on Playa Honda, pick up bags of rice and beans and deliver them to a marked house. Once done, teams were instructed to find their next clue on Playita Aspin. Teams then had to return to Panama City and search the ferry terminal for their next clue.
- In this leg's second Roadblock, one team member had to ride a 150-meter zipline from the 37th floor of Poin Panamá and search for the Pit Stop before retrieving their next clue.
- After the second Roadblock, teams had to travel to the Biomuseo, set up a spiral of dominoes and then have each tile fall sequentially before receiving their next clue, which directed them to the Pit Stop: Mirador del Pacífico.

Additional notes

- This was a non-elimination leg.

=== Leg 9 (Panama) ===
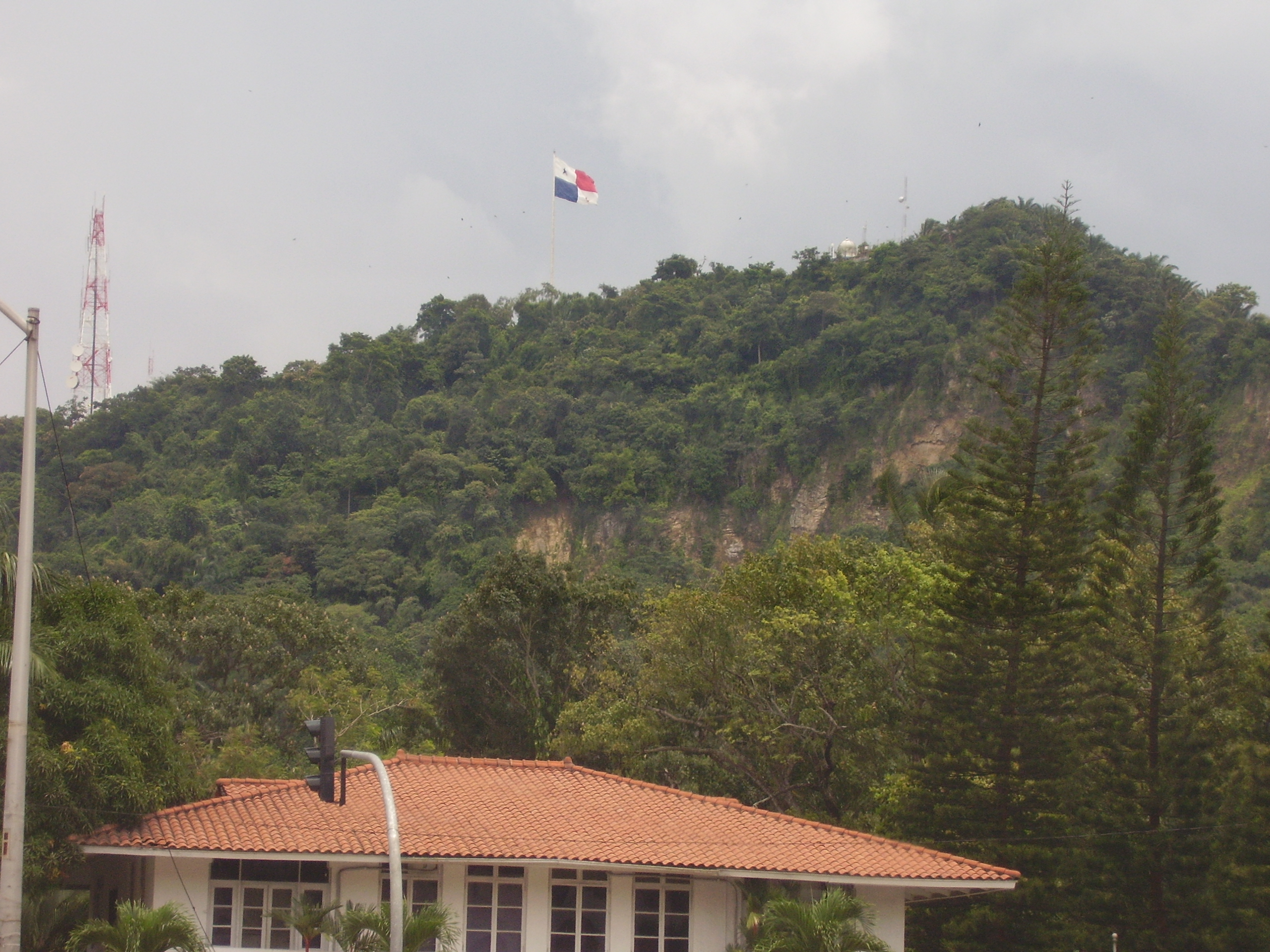
For one task in Panama City, teams had to travel up Ancón Hill and deliver coconuts in a wheelbarrow.

- Episode 9: "Sloths in Sight" / "Laiskiaisia näkyvissä" (30 November 2024)
- Eliminated: Leea & Kaarina

Locations

- Panama City (Atlapa Convention Centre)
  - Panama City (Tim's Car Wash)
- Panama City (Casco Viejo – Plaza Quinto Centenario)
- Panama City (Casco Viejo – Calle Colón or Mercado de Mariscos)
- Panama City (5 de Mayo Station) → San Miguelito (Villa Lucre Station)
- San Miguelito (Panthers Boxing Gym)
- Panama City (Ancón Hill)
- Panama City (Goethals Monument)

Episode summary

- At the start of this leg, teams were instructed to find their next clue at Plaza Quinto Centenario.
- For their Speed Bump, Leea & Kaarina had to wash a car before they could continue racing.
- This leg's Detour was a choice between Shoe (Kenkä) or Fish (Kala). In Shoe, teams had to make a pair of leather sandals before receiving their next clue. In Fish, teams had to purchase and fillet several fish from a list before receiving their next clue.
- After the Detour, teams had to travel by Panama Metro to Villa Lucre Station and find their next clue.
- In this leg's Roadblock, one team member had to perform a series of boxing strikes in a ring before receiving their next clue.
- After the Roadblock, teams had to find their next clue at Ancón Hill. Teams then had to load a wheelbarrow with coconuts and deliver them to top of the hill with teams receiving five more coconuts halfway up the hill. After delivering the coconuts to a merchant, teams found their next clue, which directed them to the Pit Stop: the Goethals Monument.

Additional note

- Although the last team to arrive at the Pit Stop was eliminated, there was no rest period at the end of the leg and all remaining teams were instead instructed to continue racing.

=== Leg 10 (Panama) ===
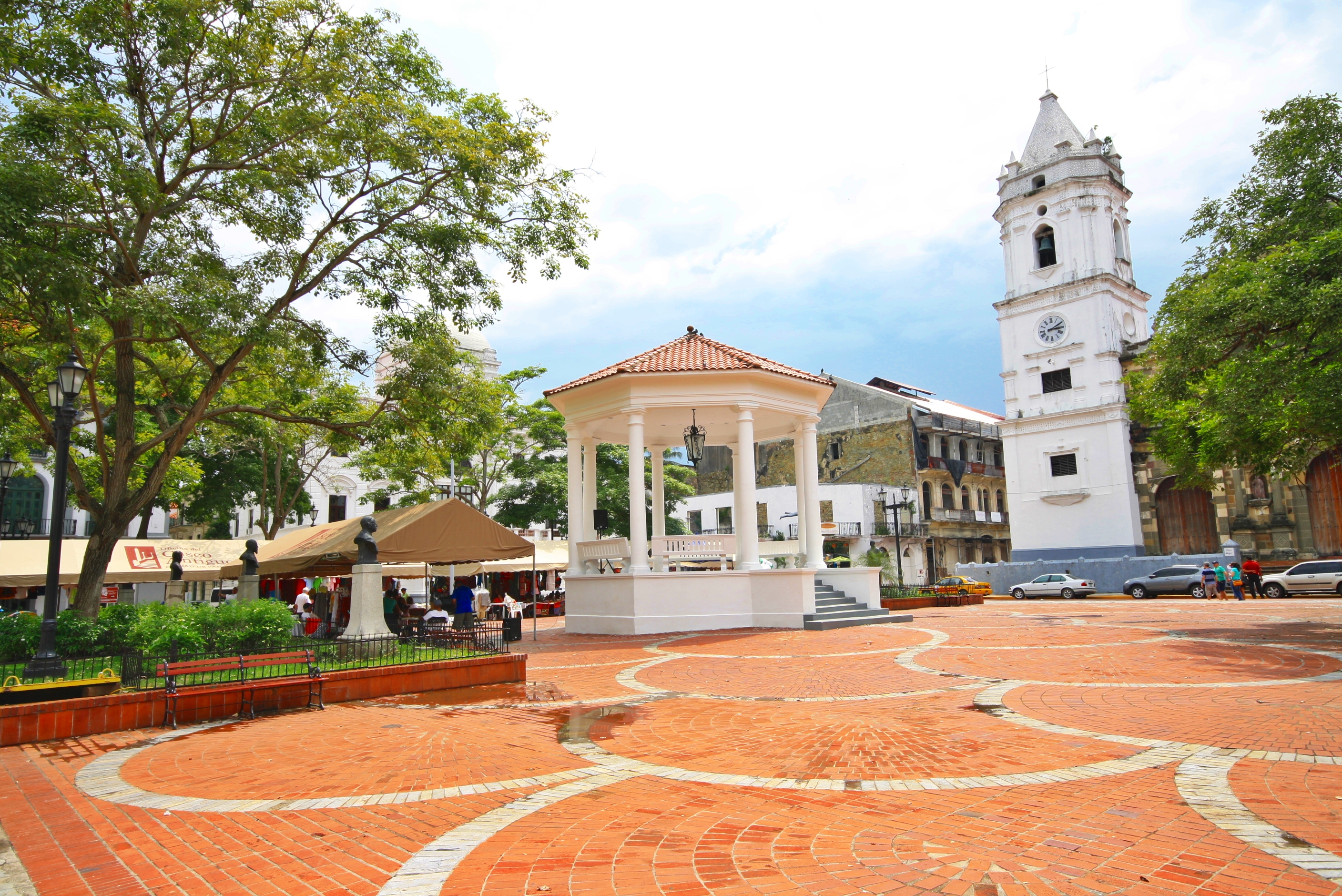
The Detour for the tenth leg took place in Plaza de la Independencia within Casco Viejo.

- Episode 10: "Local Delicacies" / "Paikallista herkkua" (7 December 2024)
- Prize: A weekend stay at the Arctic SnowHotel in Rovaniemi (awarded to Mimosa & Pati)

Locations

- Panama City (Goethals Monument)
- Panama City (Casco Viejo – Archcatedral Basilica of Santa María la Antigua)
- Panama City (Casco Viejo – Plaza de la Independencia)
- Panama City (Ciudad del Saber – Cuadrángulo Central)
- Panama City (Ciudad del Saber – Jarman Field)
- Panama City (Cinta Costera – Parador Fotográfico)

Episode summary

- At the start of this leg, teams were instructed to find their next clue near the location engraved in the back side of a balboa coin: Archcatedral Basilica of Santa María la Antigua. Teams found the clue box inside the kiosk at the center of Plaza de la Independencia near the basilica.
- This leg's Detour was a choice between Ice (Hile) or Hat (Hattu), each with a limit of three stations. In Ice, teams had to procure a raspado cart on Avenida Demetrio Brid and then sell six raspados for US$1 apiece at Plaza de la Independencia before receiving their next clue. In Hat, teams had to memorise a Panama hat on La Calle De los Sombreros and then search Plaza de la Independencia for a person with an identical hat before receiving their next clue.
- In this leg's Roadblock, one team member had to become a drum major and correctly lead a marching band with a choreographed mace routine before receiving their next clue.
- After the Roadblock, both team members had to score a base hit in a game of baseball against a children's team. Teams then received a selfie of Heikki in front of a Panama sign. As there are two similar signs in Panama City, team had to figure out by looking at background details that the Pit Stop was located at Parador Fotográfico on Cinta Costera and not at the one on the Causeway Islands.

Additional note

- This was a non-elimination leg.

=== Leg 11 (Panama → Costa Rica) ===
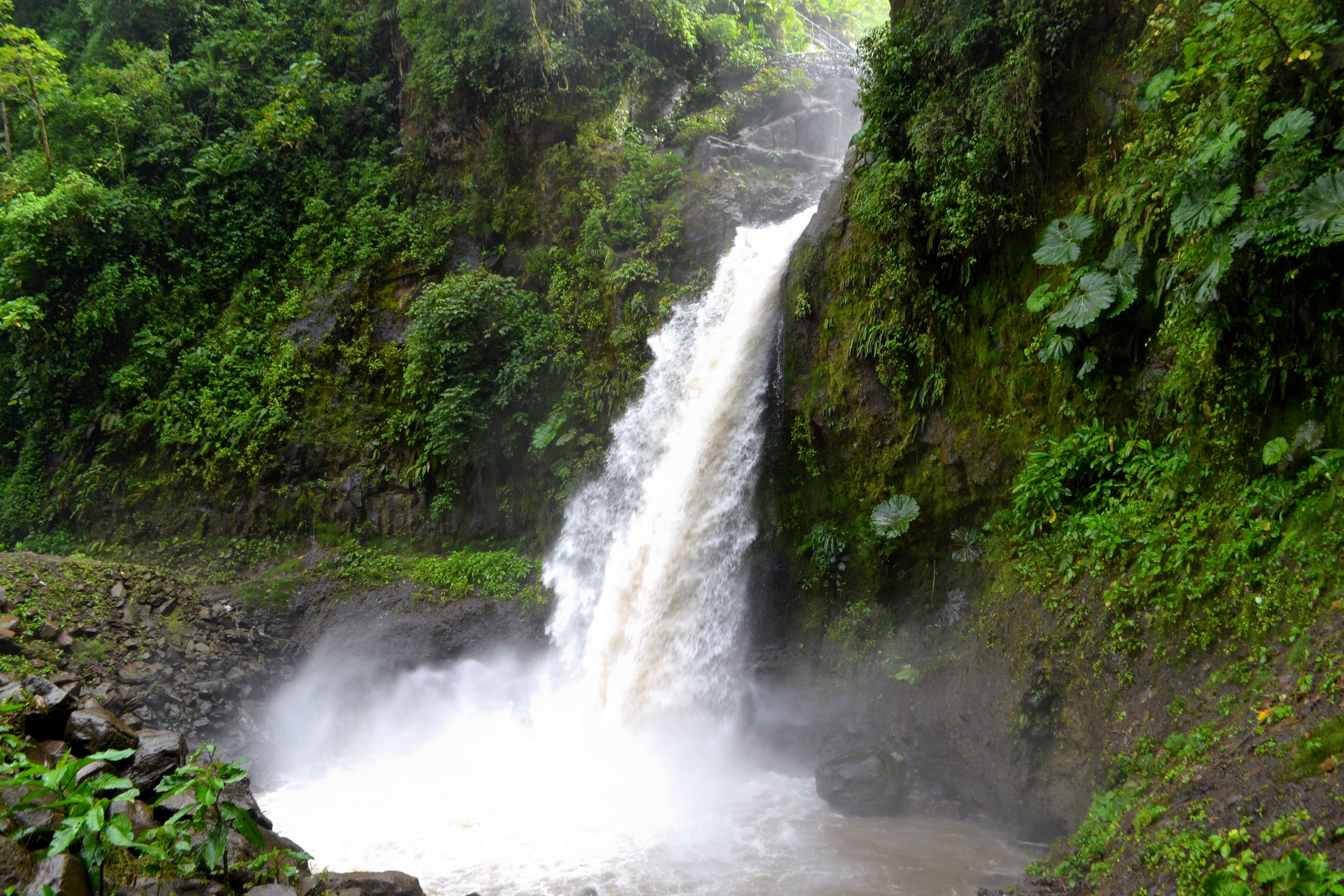
Teams visited the La Paz Waterfall Gardens Nature Park while in Costa Rica.

- Episode 11: "From One Emotion to Another" / "Tunteesta toiseen" (14 December 2024)
- Eliminated: Paulus & Adeliina

Locations

- Panama City (Atlapa Convention Centre)
- Panama City (Tocumen International Airport) → San José, Costa Rica (Juan Santamaría International Airport)
- La Garita (Hotel Martino Resort & Spa)
- Santo Domingo (Territorio de Zaguates)
- Sarapiquí (La Paz Waterfall Gardens Nature Park)
- Varablanca (Restaurante La Naturaleza)
- San Juan (Cabaña Carmela)
- San Isidro (La Casa del Café)

Episode summary

- At the start of this leg, teams were instructed to fly to San José, Costa Rica. Once there, teams were released from the Hotel Martino Resort & Spa in the order that they finished the previous leg.
- For their Speed Bump, Paulus & Adeliina had to dive into the hotel's pool and retrieve their next clue.
- Teams had to travel by taxi to Territorio de Zaguates, where they had to assemble a dog bed from a car tyre, bring two bags of dog food to an employee using a wheelbarrow and dispose of the empty bags before receiving their next clue. Teams then had to travel to La Paz Waterfall Gardens Nature Park, find five tiles with a large and small letter, unscramble the tiles to form the word Kukka (Flower) with the large letters and unlock a letter lock for a box containing their next clue with the small letters.
- This season's final Detour was a choice between Luck (Tuuri) or Work (Työmaa). In Luck, teams had to find a banana from a hanging display with dye inside it before receiving their next clue. Teams had to eat any banana without dye before choosing another one. In Work, teams had to stack watermelons into an 8x8 pyramid before receiving their next clue.
- After the Detour, teams had to travel to Cabaña Carmela, choose an ear tag, find a cow with a matching tag and herd the cow into a pasture before receiving their next clue, which directed them to the Pit Stop: La Casa del Café in San Isidro.

=== Leg 12 (Costa Rica → Finland) ===
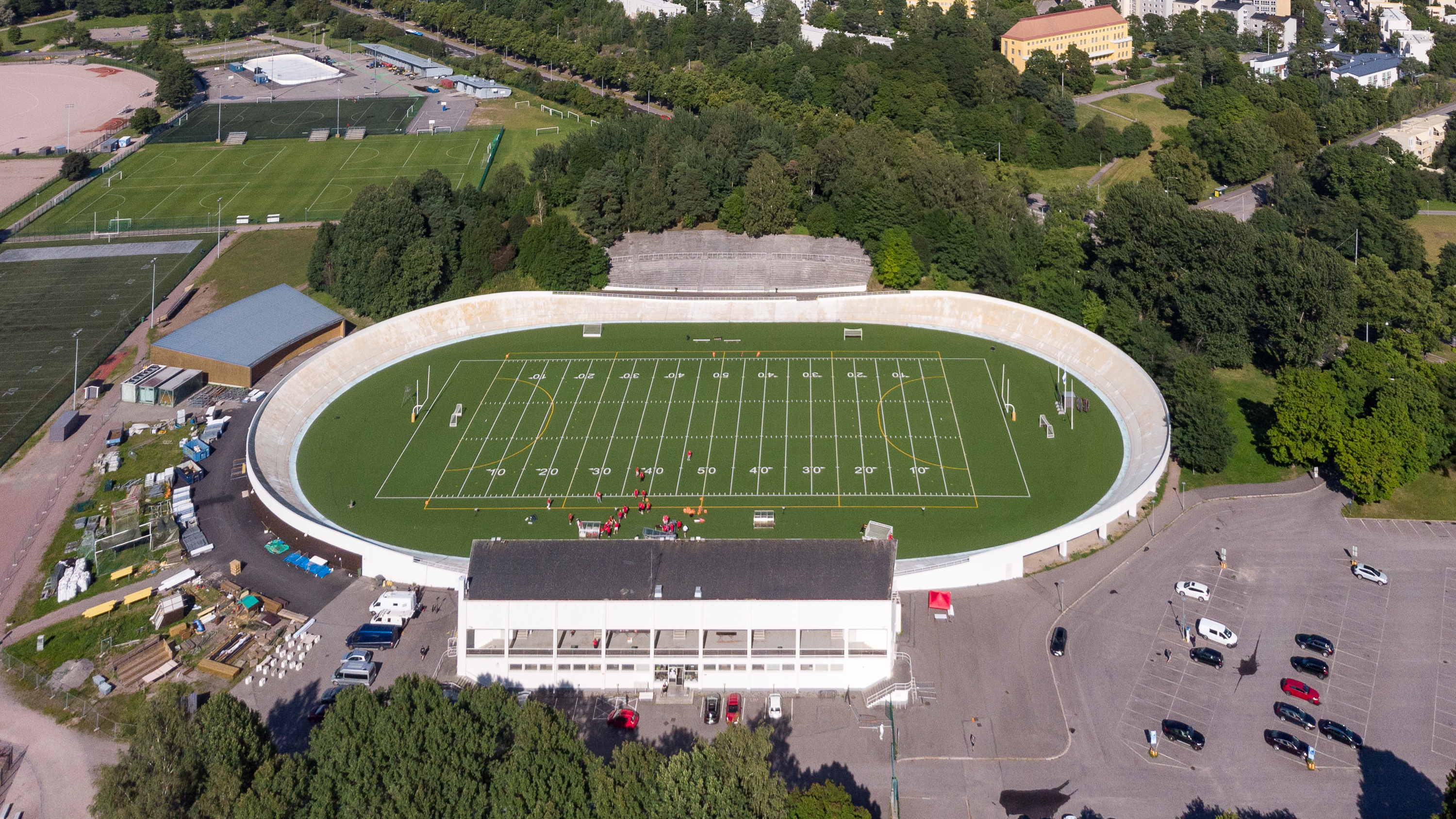
The second season of Amazing Race Suomi returned to the Helsinki Velodrome for its conclusion.

Locations

- Episode 12: "The Final Leg" / "Viimeinen etappi" (21 December 2024)
- Prize: €30,000
- Winners: Metti & Hanna
- Runners-up: Mimosa & Pati
- Third place: Elias & Matias

Locations

- La Garita (Hotel Martino Resort & Spa)
- Tárcoles (Club de Playa Punta Leona)
- Tárcoles (Playa Mantas)
- Jacó (Vista Los Sueños Adventure Park)
- Jacó (Mirador Playa Hermosa)
- Jacó (Playa Hermosa)
- San José (Juan Santamaría International Airport) → Helsinki, Finland (Helsinki–Vantaa Airport)
- Vantaa (Lentoparkki Oy)
- Helsinki (Villa Furuvik)
- Helsinki (Helsinki Velodrome)

Episode summary

- At the start of this leg, teams were instructed to travel into Puntarenas Province. Once there, teams were released from Club de Playa Punta Leona in the order that they finished the previous leg and were directed to Playa Mantas.
- In this leg's first Roadblock, one team member had to paddle a standup paddleboard to one of three buoys, dive down to retrieve a Boruca mask and exchange it for their next clue, which directed teams to the Vista Los Sueños Adventure Park.
- In this season's final Roadblock, one team member had to ride a zipline while balancing two trays of food and drinks without letting any item fall before receiving their next clue.
- After the second Roadblock, teams had to throw darts at balloons until they popped the one with glitter before receiving their next clue. Teams then had to travel to Mirador Playa Hermosa, spot a clue box on Playa Hermosa using binoculars and retrieve their next clue, which instructed them to fly to Helsinki, Finland.
- Once in Helsinki, teams found their next clue in the airport instructing them to travel by shuttle bus to Lentoparkki Oy and find a car with a registration plate matching the one in their clue. Teams then had to drive to Villa Furuvik and solve a puzzle by recalling essential facts of the season before receiving their final clue, which directed them to the finish line: the Helsinki Velodrome.

Leg	Flag	Location	Clue Phrase	Symbol
1	Poland	Wieliczka	Piotr Skarga	Diamond
2	Poland	Barbican	Siema!	Tray
3	Romania	Horeca	Să ai parte de noroc	Music note
4	Romania	Parcul Carol	Y=4	Book
5	Colombia	Casa Palermo	Pedro & Guillermo	Chili
6	Colombia	Estadio Édgar Rentería	Listo!	Paint roller
7	Colombia	Castillo San Felipe de Barajas	¿Me das la cámara por favor?	Drum
8	Panama	Taboga Island	¡Ahoy!	Dominoes
9	Panama	Cerro Ancón	Villa Lucre	Wheelbarrow
10	Panama	Cuadrángulo Central	Balboa	Baseball bat
11	Costa Rica	Casa del Cafe	Casita de la paz	Dog
12	Costa Rica	Playa Mantas	Pura Vida!	Zipline

== Reception ==
=== Critical reception ===
The second season of Amazing Race Suomi has gathered mixed opinions amongst the television consumers.

While some people critiqued the length of the episodes and lack of entertaining teams, most of the fans were delighted about the much faster pace of Amazing Race Suomi compared to the first season. More diverse locations in Europe and Latin America gained praise, as the previous season only visited in Southeast Asia. The new element, the Express Pass, also gained praise on Jodel-app, and it was viewed as a freshening addition. Much more complicated and difficult tasks were viewed as a positive side, and changing placements between the teams brought much more tense and exciting viewing experience. However, during the third leg in Romania, the Roadblock task requiring the teams to eat meat-based food caused heavy criticism on Finnish social media, as many of the contestants confess to be vegetarians or vegans.

The season premiere episode debuted with very high ratings on channel Nelonen. With the highest peak of over 770,000 viewers, the episode achieved 407,000 viewers on average, making it the 2nd best performing episode of an entertainment series on the network during the week.

=== Television ratings ===
The following ratings are taken from Finnpanel.

No.	Air date	Episode	Weekly rank	Viewers	Ref
1	5 October 2024	The Race Begins Now	2	407,000	
2	12 October 2024	New Set Ups	2	296,000	
3	19 October 2024	Tough Decisions at Cooking School	2	279,000	
4	26 October 2024	Dramatic Night	2	300,000	
5	2 November 2024	Whistling Vocals	4	243,000	
6	9 November 2024	Searching For the Lost Hips	4	267,000	
7	16 November 2024	Some Cake Too	2	317,000	
8	23 November 2024	An Island Without Cars	2	327,000	
9	30 November 2024	Sloths in Sight	2	350,000	
10	7 December 2024	Local Delicacies	1	336,000	
11	14 December 2024	From One Emotion to Another	2	321,000	
12	21 December 2024	The Final Leg	1	492,000	
