= Dogs (TV series) =

2018 US documentary television series

- Genre: Documentary
- Created by: Glen Zipper
- Music by: Johannes Winkler; Edo Van Breemen
- Country of origin: United States
- Original language: English
- No. of seasons: 2
- No. of episodes: 10

Production
- Executive producers: Amy J. Berg; Glen Zipper
- Producer: Paul McGuire
- Running time: 44–54 minutes
- Production companies: Disarming Films; Zipper Bros Films

Original release
- Network: Netflix
- Release: November 16, 2018 – July 7, 2021

Dogs is a 2018 American documentary television series which premiered on Netflix. The series, created by Glen Zipper, was released on November 16, 2018.

The first season contains six episodes, roughly 50 minutes apiece. Each episode examines a facet of life in which dogs and humans interconnect, showcasing the relationship between dogs and humans for different countries, cultures and people.

In June 2019 it was announced that the show would return for a second season. The second season was released on July 7, 2021.

== Premise ==
Dogs primarily explores the bond between dogs and humans throughout the world.

== Episodes ==
Season	Episodes	Originally released
1	6	November 16, 2018
2	4	July 7, 2021

=== Season 1 (2018) ===
No. overall	No. in season	Title	Original release date
1	1	"The Kid with a Dog"	November 16, 2018
Corrine, a young American girl with epilepsy living in West Chester Township, Ohio and her family struggle to cope with her disorder. They apply to receive a service dog, a Goldendoodle named Rory, who can help Corrine detect seizures before they occur. The family then adjusts to Rory's presence.
2	2	"Bravo, Zeus"	November 16, 2018
A Syrian refugee named Ayham attempts to smuggle his dog, Zeus, out of Damascus, Syria to Berlin, Germany, where he is living, with the help of an animal welfare group.
3	3	"Ice on the Water"	November 16, 2018
An elderly Labrador Retriever, a family dog named Ice, helps his owner, Italian fisherman and restaurant owner Alessandro, living on the coast of Lake Como, as his livelihood is threatened.
4	4	"Scissors Down"	November 16, 2018
Japanese dog groomers Miki and Kenichi travel to the United States for a dog grooming competition, where their style clashes with their American competitors.
5	5	"Territorio de Zaguates"	November 16, 2018
Costa Ricans Álvaro and Lya attempt to solve their country's widespread problems with abandoned dogs by dedicating their lives to running a free-range animal shelter called Territorio de Zaguates. Operating mostly on volunteer donations, they face problems with Costa Rican animal welfare authorities and other animal attacks on the dogs.
6	6	"Second Chances"	November 16, 2018
New York City's relationship with dogs and its dog adoption system is examined via American dog adoption advocate Anna, who drives dogs in danger of being euthanized at shelters in Texas to New York City to be adopted, placed in no-kill shelters, or placed in foster care.

=== Season 2 (2021) ===
No. overall	No. in season	Title	Original release date
7	1	"Much Ado About Blue"	July 7, 2021
Butler University's beloved mascot — an aging English bulldog named Trip — faces retirement just as his longtime handler must undergo a risky surgery.
8	2	"Space for Dogs"	July 7, 2021
A former astronaut, Leland D. Melvin, hits the road with his Rhodesian Ridgebacks on an emotional trip to honor his friends, the deceased crew of Space Shuttle Columbia.
9	3	"It Takes a Village Dog"	July 7, 2021
Dog lovers reach across borders to help a returning American veteran get a stray puppy from Iraq to the US, where they both face new difficulties.
10	4	"The Protectors"	July 7, 2021
A Brazilian priest's abiding compassion for unwanted strays inspires a grassroots network devoted to finding them homes, one dog at a time.

== Reception ==
The series has received positive reviews from critics. On Rotten Tomatoes, the series' first season has a 92% approval rating with an average score of 9.17 out of 10 based on 12 critic reviews. The site's critical consensus states, "Dogs is a kindhearted series that offers viewers a glimpse of several extraordinary canines and the people they orbit, resulting in a hopeful celebration of humanity and its best friend." Laura Bradley of Vanity Fair stated that "its primary draw is its earnest storytelling—never manipulative, never syrupy. Yes, there’s fluff on the surface—but at its core, Dogs is good."
