= Alfred P. Shaw =

American architect

Alfred P. Shaw (May 13, 1895 – December 1, 1970) was an American architect based in Chicago, Illinois. He worked at Graham, Anderson, Probst & White, then in various partnerships, and headed his Alfred Shaw and Associates firm. He was a director for the American Institute of Architects. The Smithsonian has a collection of his documents including correspondence with Alexander Calder.

Shaw was born in Dorchester, Massachusetts to Enoch Shaw and Ellen Phillips Shaw. He studied at St. John's Preparatory School in Danvers, Massachusetts and the Boston Architectural Club Atelier.

He worked in Boston and then New York before settling in Chicago with Graham, Anderson, Probst & White in 1922. He became a junior partner in 1929. He was chief architect for the Merchandise Mart. and worked with Sigurd Naess at the firm.

After he was fired in 1936 following the death of Ernest Graham he formed Shaw, Naess and Murphy with Naess and C. F. Murphy. Other partnerships followed including Shaw Metz Dolio, Shaw Metz, and Alfred Shaw Associates.

Shaw served in the Aviation Section of the Army Signal Corps during World War I. He married Rue Winterbotham and had two sons Patrick and Joseph.

== Work ==
- Civic Opera House
- McCormick Place exposition hall
- Merchandise Mart
- Marshall Field & Co. downtown Chicago store
- Continental Plaza Hotel
- Museum of Science and Industry (Chicago) interior
- Goethals Monument to George W. Goethals in Panama
