= Tuure Boelius =

Finnish YouTuber, singer and actor

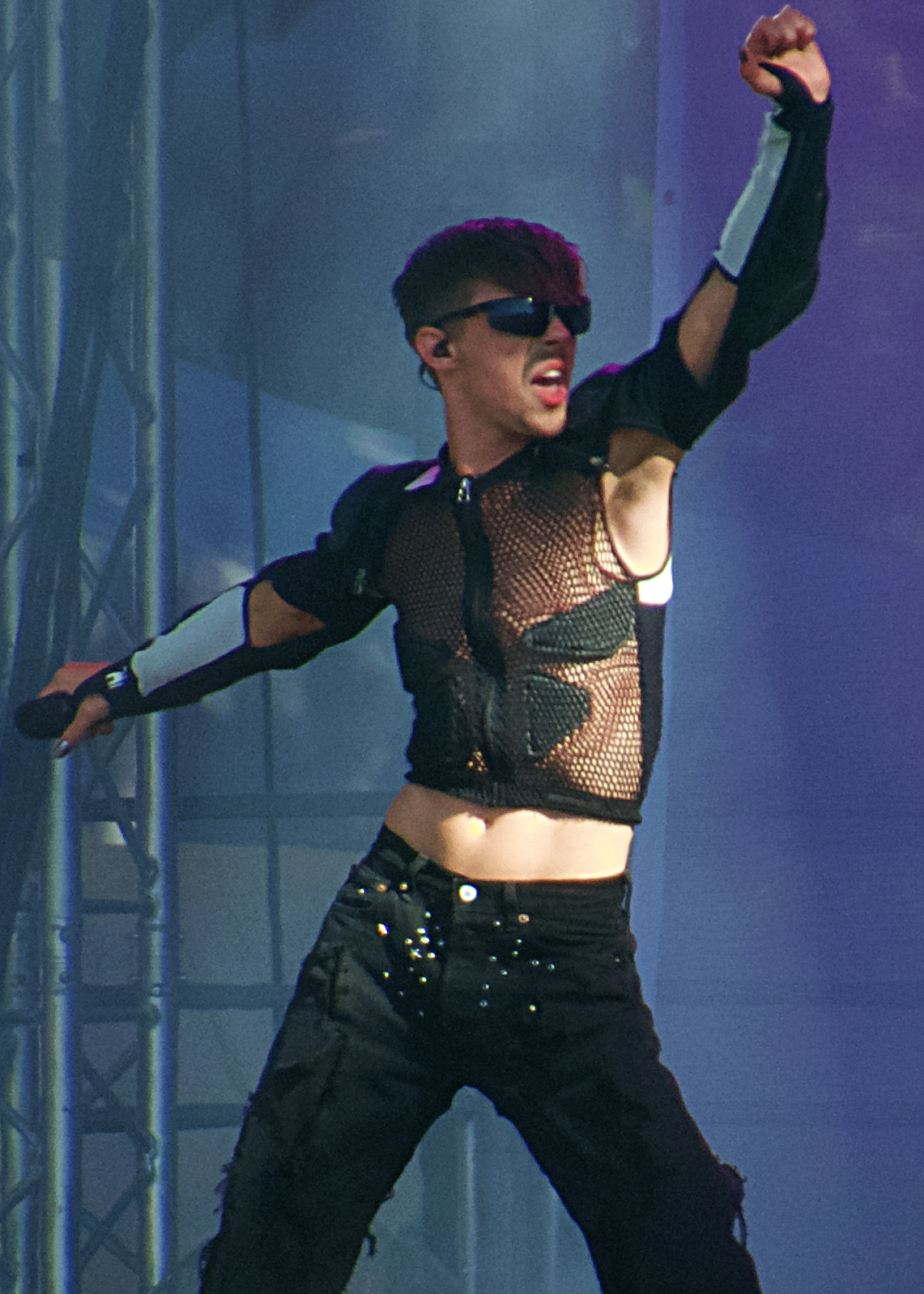
- Boelius at Helsinki Pride in 2024

Background information
- Born: Tuure Boelius; 3 January 2001 (age 25); Pori, Finland
- Instrument: Vocals
- Years active: 2017–present
- Label: Kaiku Entertainment

YouTube information
- Channel: Tuure Boelius
- Years active: 2014–present
- Subscribers: 135 thousand
- Views: 41.4 million
- Last updated: 22 October 2025

Tuure Elmeri Boelius (born 3 January 2001) is a Finnish YouTuber, singer and actor. He was born in Pori, Finland.

== Career ==
Boelius signed a contract with Kaiku Entertainment in January 2017, with his first single, "Eikö sua hävetä", realised in August 2017.

He has worked as an actor at several plays in Pori Theatre. He has also played Touko Laaksonen as a child in Turku City Theatre.

Boelius competed on the eleventh season of Tanssii tähtien kanssa and placed third.

In 2024, Boelius competed on the second season of Amazing Race Suomi with his sister Saana and placed tenth.

In 2025 he was a contestant on season four of Petolliset. He was selected to be a Secret Traitor. He was banished in 10th place.

== Personal life ==
Boelius has ADHD. He came out as gay on a YouTube video in November 2016. He was chosen as Gay of the Year in February 2017 by QX Gay Gaala. Some people contacted the Finnish Ombudsman for Children because the award had been given to a minor. The Ombudsman commented that children's privacy should be protected but that children are also free to express themselves.

== Discography ==
=== Albums ===
List of albums, with selected details and chart positions
Title	Details	Peak chart positions
Title	Details	FIN
Mun totuus	Released: 29 September 2023; Label: Sony Finland	24

=== Singles ===
List of singles, with selected chart positions
Title	Year	Peak chart positions
Title	Year	FIN
"Eikö sua hävetä"	2017	1
"Oh Boe"	2017	19
"Lätkäjätkä-Ville"	2018	4
"Naiivi"	2018	7
"Vihaan rakastaa sua"	2019	8
"Tytöt tykkää"	2019	5
