= Ciudad Salitre =

- Barrio
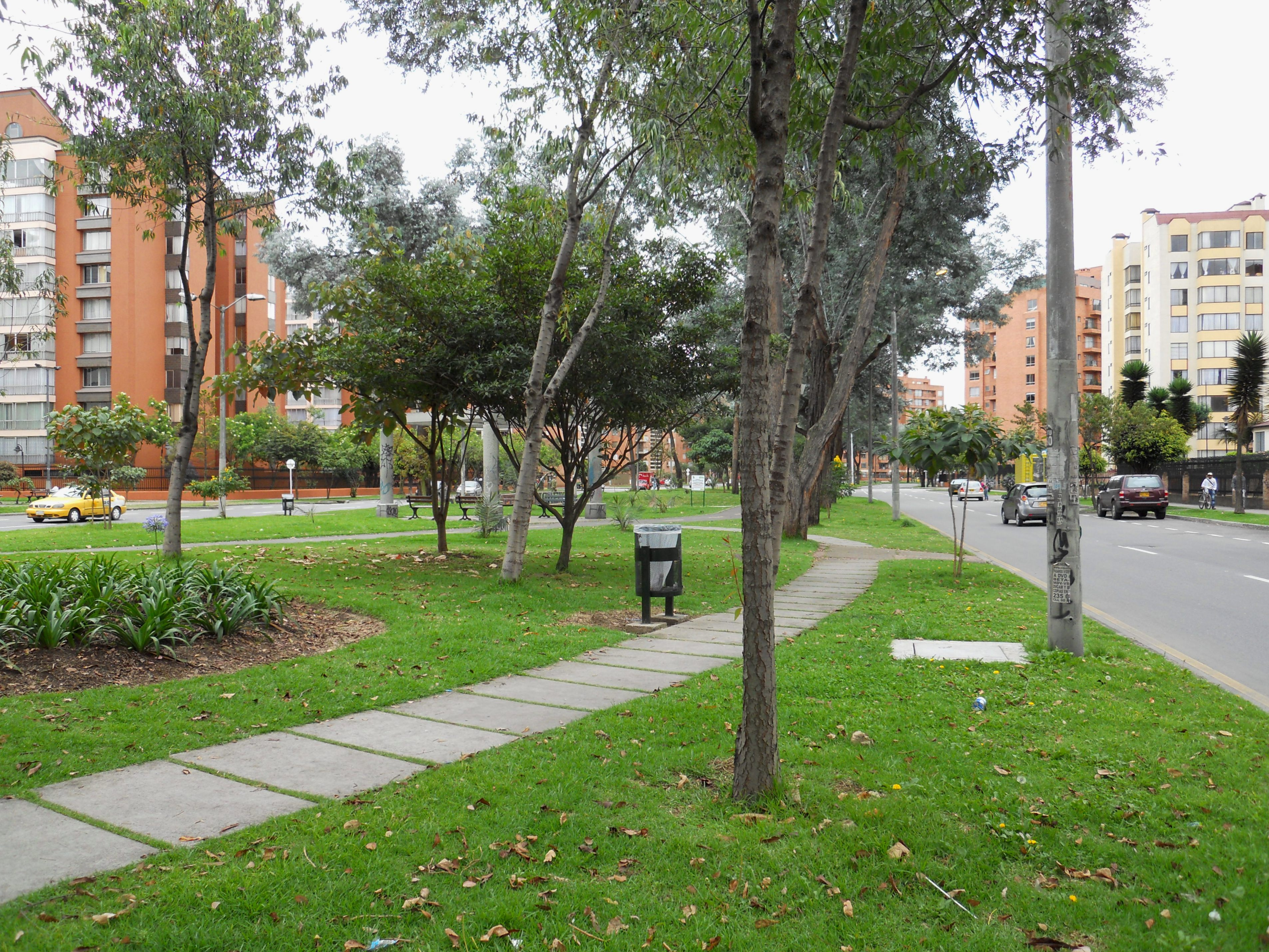
- Green area in the neighbourhood
- Etymology: Hacienda El Salitre
- Ciudad Salitre (3)

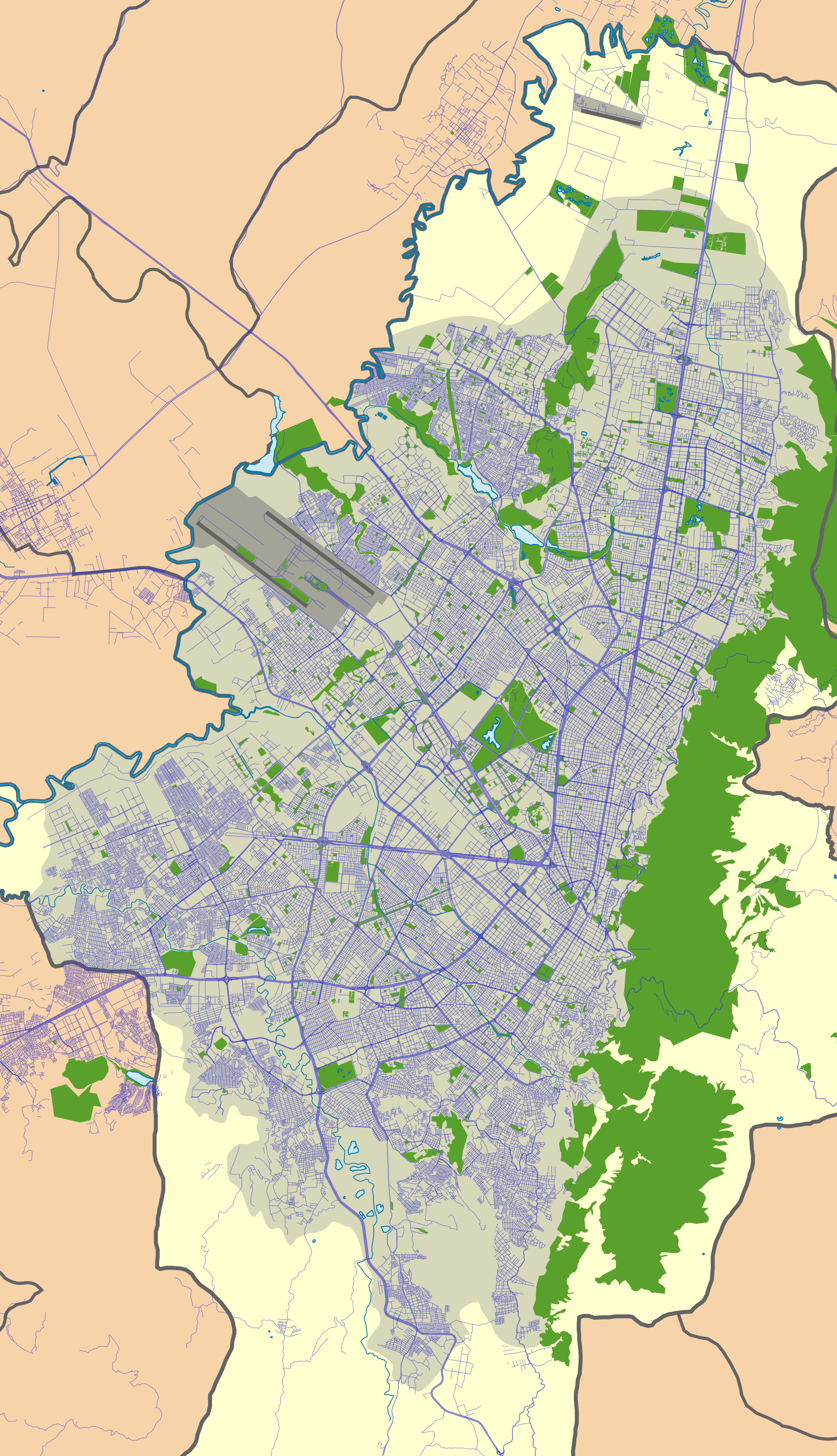
- Location in Bogotá
- Coordinates: 4°39′10.9″N 74°06′40.1″W
- Country: Colombia
- Department: Distrito Capital
- City: Bogotá
- Locality: Teusaquillo, Fontibón
- Elevation: 2,551 m (8,369 ft)

Ciudad Salitre is a neighborhood (barrio) spanning the localities of Teusaquillo and Fontibón in Bogotá, Colombia.

== Limits ==
- North: Avenida El Dorado
- South: San Francisco River
- West: Avenida Boyacá
- East: Carrera 50

== Description ==
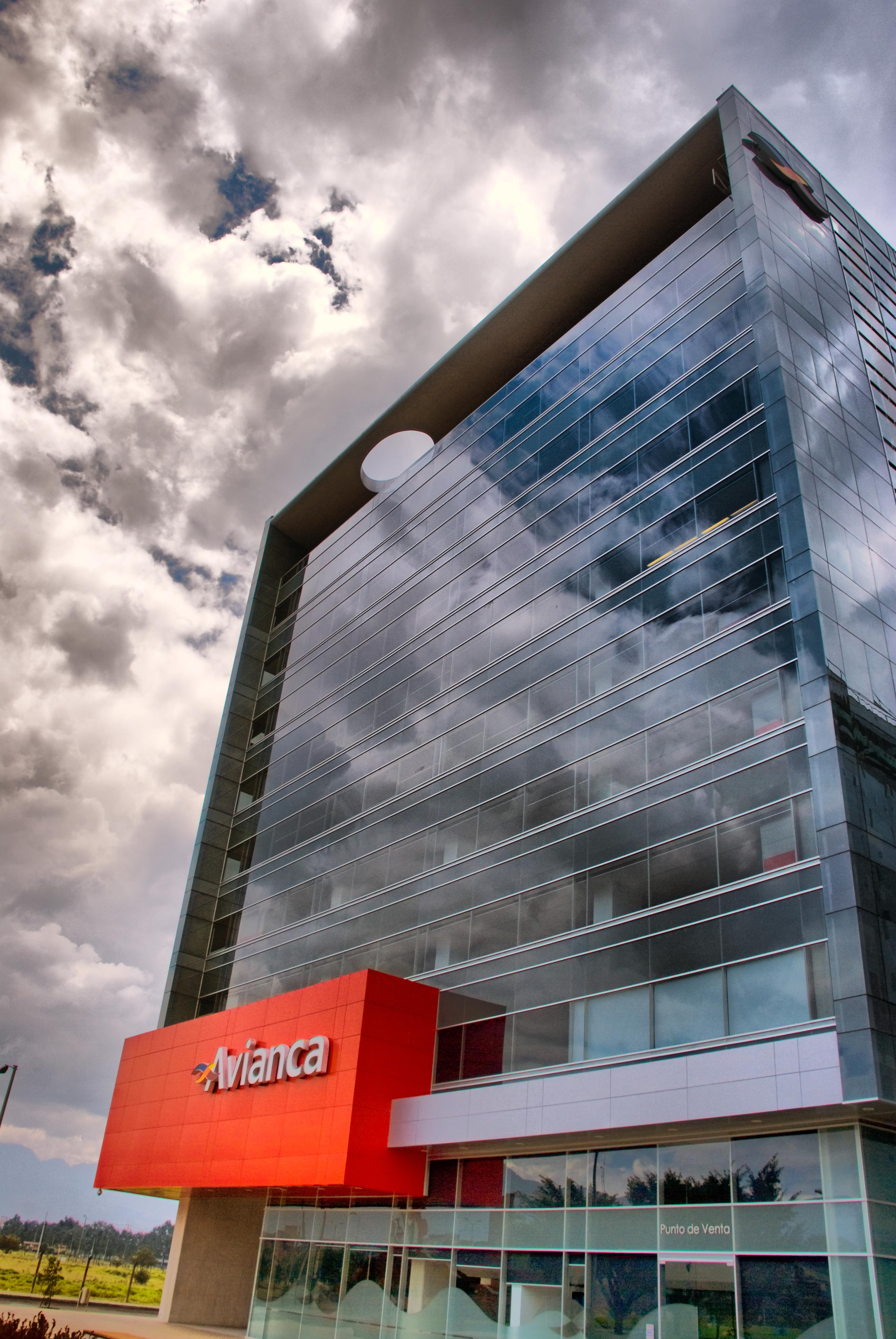
Headquarters of Avianca

The Maloka Museum and Avianca headquarters are located in the neighborhood.
