= Petolliset =

Finnish reality television series

- Genre: Reality; Game show
- Based on: De Verraders by: Marc Pos; Jasper Hoogendoorn
- Presented by: Christoffer Strandberg
- Country of origin: Finland
- Original language: Finnish
- No. of series: 4
- No. of episodes: 34 (list of episodes)

Production
- Camera setup: Multi-camera
- Running time: 59 minutes

Original release
- Network: Nelonen; Ruutu+
- Release: 7 September 2023 – present

Related
- De Verraders; The Traitors (franchise)

Petolliset (English: The Traitorous) is a Finnish reality television based on the Dutch program De Verraders. It is airing on network Nelonen and Ruutu+, and is presented by Christoffer Strandberg. It first aired in September 2023.

After the success of the first season, the program was renewed for its second season, airing the following Autumn 2024. It was then again renewed for a third season for Nelonen Media's spring programme 2025.

== Format ==
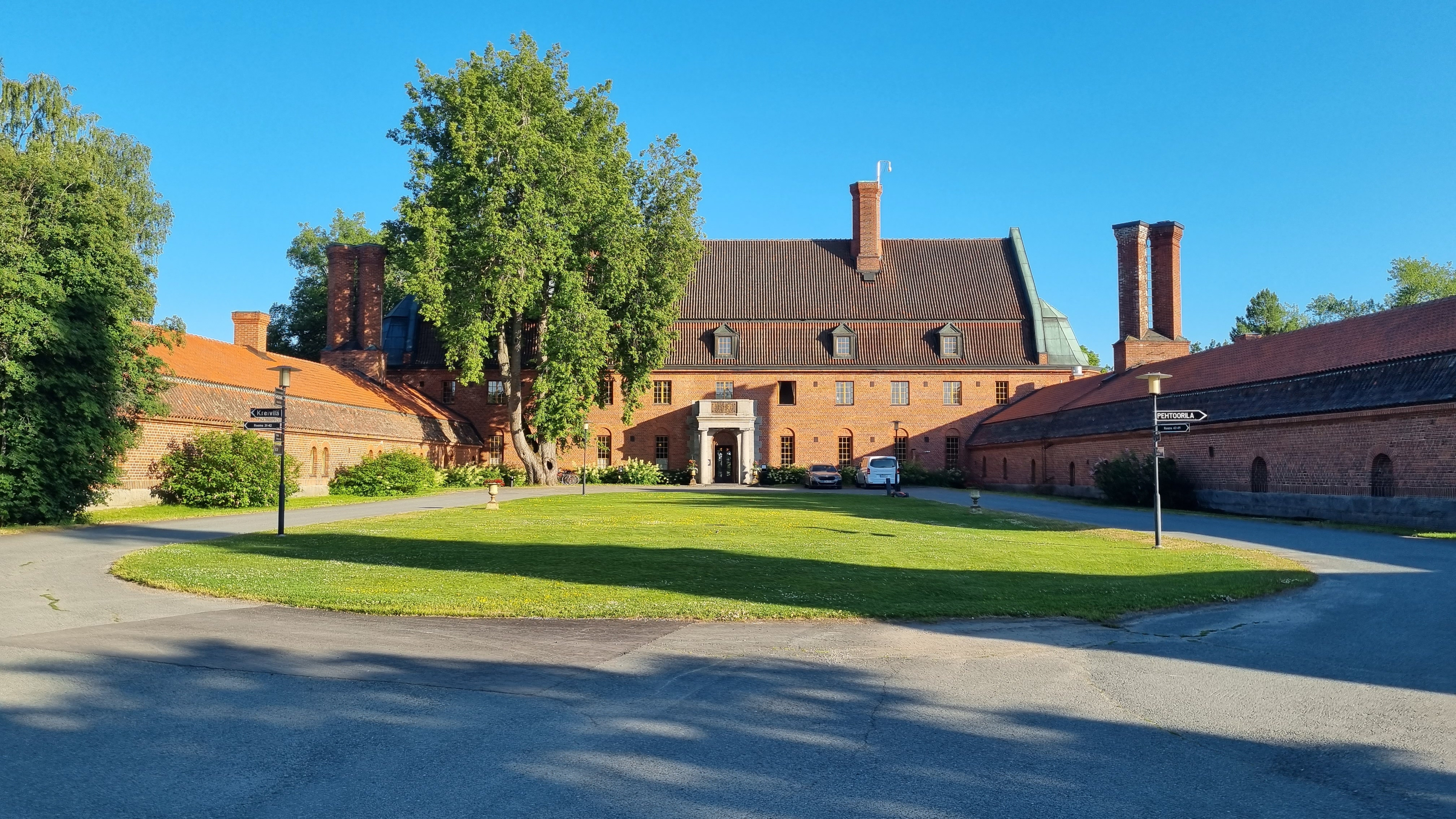
Vanajanlinna Manor in Hämeenlinna serves as the filming location of the program.

The format of the program follows the premise of the other international versions. 18 Finnish celebrity contestants arrive at Vanajanlinna Manor in Hämeenlinna, where they will spend their entire time for the duration of the game. On the arrival day, host Christoffer Strandberg chooses various amount — but at least three — contentestants to be called "Traitors" (Petolliset) and the rest are automatically called "Faithfuls" (Uskolliset). The television audience can see who have been chosen as Traitors, but the Faithful do not know their identity.

At the end of each day, all contestants meet at a Round Table to discuss who they think are Traitors. They then cast votes that are revealed one-by-one. The person with the most votes reveals their identity — and regardless of whether they are a Faithful or Traitor — are immediately banished. On most nights, the Traitors meet in their private Chamber and agree to "murder" one Faithful who leaves the game immediately. The remaining Faithfuls only know who has been murdered at breakfast following next morning.

Each day, the group participates in missions to win money for the prize fund which can reach up to €30,000 (€25,000 in the first season) by the end of the game. During the missions, any contestant may separately win a shield that awards that player immunity from being murdered, but not from being banished. In some cases, the contestant has the right or ability not to disclose if they won the shield, or to tell a restricted group. The contestants can also earn daggers from some of the tasks, in which occasion their votes on the Round Table are count as twice for one person, or one vote for two different contestants, upon their will.

If during the game the number of Traitors drops to two (happened first time in Season 2), they are given the option to "seduce" or "recruit" one of the Faithfuls to join them instead of murdering. The seduced Faithfuls may decline and can decide whether to tell the other Faithfuls of the attempted seduction. If only one Traitor remains, the seduction happens face-to-face and if the player declines they are immediately murdered; if they accept, the pair can immediately murder another Faithful.

== Series overview ==
Series overview
Series	Contestants	Episodes	Originally released		Winner(s)	Prize	Traitors	Average viewers
Series	Contestants	Episodes	First released	Last released	Winner(s)	Prize	Traitors	Average viewers
1	18	8	7 September 2023	26 October 2023	Heikki Sorsa; Sita Salminen (Traitors)	€16,000	Janne Porkka; Heikki Sorsa; Sita Salminen	196,875
2	18	8	29 August 2024	10 November 2024 (Note: The final episode of the second season was postponed from October to be aired later, in November 2024 due to the death of one of the contestants (traitor), ex-hockey player Janne Puhakka. During the opening- and closing credits of the finale, a homage was paid for Puhakka.)	Fatim Diarra; Miisa Nuorgam; Rami "Ramses II" Shikeben (Faithfuls)	€20,000	Jone Nikula; Cristal Snow; Janne Puhakka† (recruited); Dan Tolppanen (recruited)	222,750
3	18	8	28 April 2025	16 June 2025	Janne Grönroos; Marjo Toskala; Tiina Forsby (Traitors)	€22,000	Amelie Blauberg; Janne Grönroos; Marjo Toskala; Tiina Forsby	176,875
4	20	10	13 September 2025	15 November 2025	Sofia Zida; Susanna Penttilä (Faithfuls)	€25,000	Annimari Korte; Viki Konssi; Tuure Boelius	147,200

== Episodes ==
=== Season 1 (2023) ===
No. overall	No. in series	Title (in english)	Original release date	Finnish viewers (millions)
1	1	"The Game Begins"	7 September 2023	0.210
2	2	"In Honor of Your Memory"	14 September 2023	0.175
3	3	"For Better Or Worse"	21 September 2023	0.144
4	4	"Sunday Drive"	28 September 2023	0.154
5	5	"The Blood is Boiling"	5 October 2023	0.223
6	6	"Kidnapping"	12 October 2023	0.209
7	7	"Moment of Truth"	19 October 2023	0.192
8	8	"The Game Ends"	26 October 2023	0.268

=== Season 2 (2024) ===
No. overall	No. in series	Title (in english)	Original release date	Finnish viewers (millions)
9	1	"Welcome to the Dark Side"	29 August 2024	0.191
10	2	"Unknown is Painful"	5 September 2024	0.198
11	3	"Return to the Crime Scene"	12 September 2024	0.190
12	4	"Explosively Good Clue"	19 September 2024	0.202
13	5	"Heads on the Chopping Board"	26 September 2024	0.242
14	6	"I Don't Want to Die Tonight"	3 October 2024	0.231
15	7	"Today Is Good Day to Die"	10 October 2024	0.201
16	8	"Light versus Darkness"	10 November 2024	0.327

=== Season 3 (Spring 2025) ===
No. overall	No. in series	Title (in english)	Original release date	Finnish viewers (millions)
17	1	"In With the Torch"	28 April 2025	0.204
18	2	"Mystery Under the Mold"	5 May 2025	0.177
19	3	"The Trap is Set"	12 May 2025	0.166
20	4	"Let It Play"	19 May 2025	0.135
21	5	"Faced With a Choise"	26 May 2025	0.177
22	6	"On a Secret Mission"	2 June 2025	0.154
23	7	"On the Trail of the Truth"	9 June 2025	0.160
24	8	"Loyalty or Trust?"	16 June 2025	0.242

=== Season 4 (Autumn 2025) ===
No. overall	No. in series	Title (in english)	Original release date	Finnish viewers (millions)
25	1	"The Castle is Ready"	13 September 2025	0.156
26	2	"Life is Celebration"	20 September 2025	N/A
27	3	"The key to the solution"	27 September 2025	
28	4	"Petanque of death"	4 October 2025	
29	5	"Secret room"	11 October 2025	
30	6	"Compromise in the chamber"	17 October 2025	
31	7	"A gap in logic"	24 October 2025	
32	8	"Decisive dagger"	20 September 2025	
33	9	"The coffin riddle"	1 November 2025	
34	10	"What's going on here?"	8 November 2025	
