= La Paz Waterfall (Costa Rica) =

Waterfall in Costa Rica

- (es) Catarata de La Paz
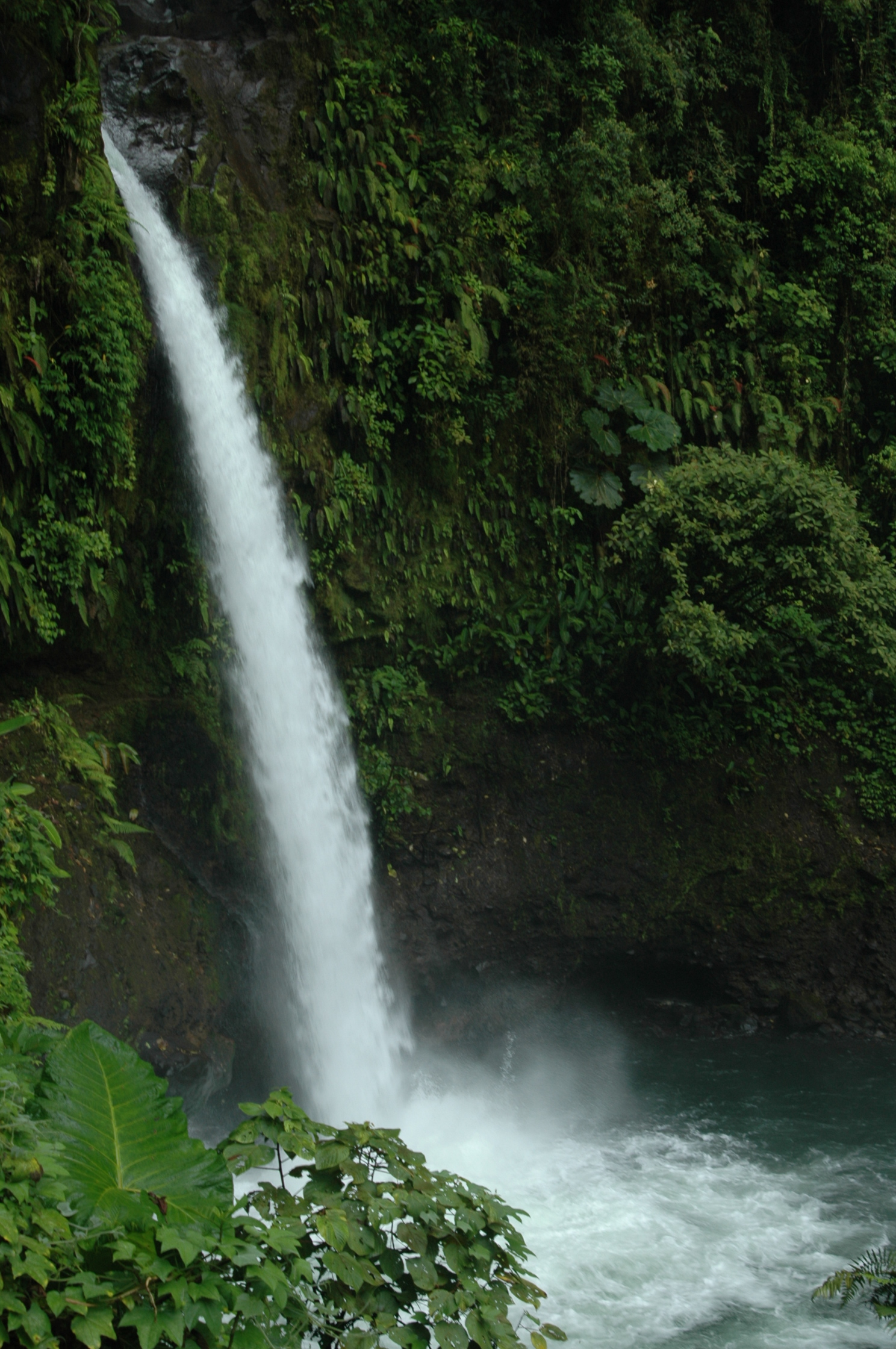
- La Paz waterfall
- Interactive map of La Paz Waterfall
- Location: Alajuela, Costa Rica
- Coordinates: 10°12′6.28″N 84°9′41.23″W
- Total height: 37 metres (121 ft)
- Number of drops: 1
- Watercourse: River La Paz

La Paz (Spanish: "the peace") is a waterfall in central Costa Rica. In Spanish, it is known as Catarata de La Paz. It is 31 kilometres (19 mi) north of Alajuela, between Vara Blanca and Cinchona.

The waterfall is located immediately alongside Route 126. The River La Paz forms the waterfall after traversing 8 kilometres (5 mi) of volcanic terrain, and then continues through the rainforest of the eastern side of Poás Volcano. A short path leads behind the waterfall, where a small shrine had been located. Upstream from the waterfall is La Paz Waterfall Gardens, a hotel and park, where visitors can observe many different species of local wildlife.

The waterfall and surrounding area were severely damaged in the 6.1 magnitude earthquake of January 8, 2009. Landslides damaged the road that runs alongside the waterfall, but has since been fixed and offers a roadside stop for photos and souvenirs.

== See also ==
- List of waterfalls
