= Territorio de Zaguates =

Territorio de Zaguates ("kingdom of strays" or "land of the strays" in English) (Note: "Zaguates" is a pejorative used for stray dogs in Costa Rica.) is a free-range no-kill dog sanctuary in Costa Rica. Sheltering more than 1,000 dogs at any given time, the sanctuary has rescued more than 12,000 dogs. Its creative campaign, "When you adopt a mutt, you adopt a unique breed", has increased adoptions of mixed-breed dogs in Costa Rica.

== History ==
Lya Battle, born in Canada, and Alvaro Saumet, from Colombia, married in 1994. They originally began taking in abandoned dogs to their home in Costa Rica in 2005, but it quickly became too crowded. When Battle inherited property from her grandfather, they moved to that 378-acre farm in 2008. Samut and Battle intended the shelter to house geriatric dogs. As more and more dogs were brought to them, they found themselves sheltering dogs of all ages.

The shelter lies between the town of Carrizal and the Poás Volcano, approximately an hour from San José.

Neighboring residents complain that the shelter brings too much traffic to the area and that the shelter contaminates the underground water supply. A volunteer environmental engineer certified that the aquifer was clean. When 11 dogs died, Battle suspected neighbors who want to buy her property. More dogs were killed by poison and other methods by unidentified attackers in 2018.

== Facilities ==
Dogs brought to the shelter are vaccinated, treated for parasites, and spayed or neutered. The shelter has feeding and bathing stations, as well as multiple watering troughs. Dogs are provided with cozy bedding. The National Animal Health Service (Senasa) sends a veterinarian monthly to verify the health of the dogs. The dogs roam freely and visitors are welcome to hike with them.

As of 2018, more than 1,000 dogs lived at Territorio de Zaguates, consuming about 858 pounds of food per day. The shelter has six full-time employees and is supplemented by both local and foreign volunteers. Saumet estimated that they have rescued more than 12,000 dogs in their first 11 years of operation.

== Adoption campaign ==
Costa Rica outlawed animal euthanasia in 2003, and the number of stray dogs in the country is estimated to be more than two million. To encourage adoptions, Territorio de Zaguates began a marketing campaign that assigned unique breed names to each dog, with the motto "When you adopt a mutt, you adopt a unique breed".

The shelter's veterinarians examined the dogs' physical traits to estimate the different breeds each might contain and assigned each a unique pedigree. Individual dogs at the shelter have been described as "Alaskan Collie Fluffyterrier", "Chewbacca Pekin Dog", "Chihuapoodle Punky Hairas", "Bunny-Tailed Scottish Shepterrier", and "Long Legged Irish Schnaufox". The head veterinarian emphasized the uniqueness of these dogs during his appearance on television, saying "These dogs exist only in our country". The campaign helped popularize the idea of adopting mixed-breed dogs and raised $457,000 for the shelter in 45 days.

== In media ==
Territorio de Zaguates was featured in episode 5, season 1, of Dogs on Netflix.
