= Goethals Monument =

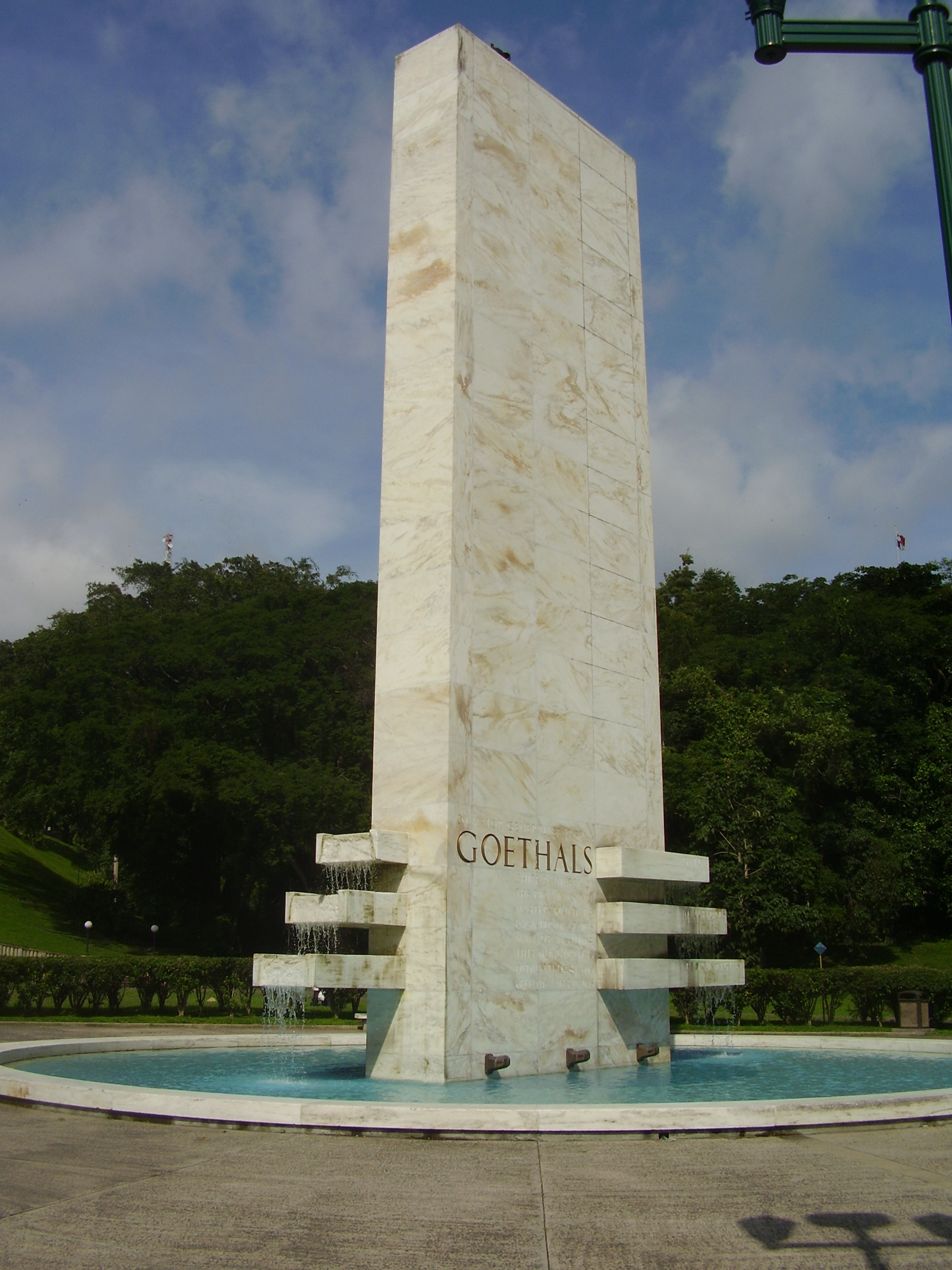
- Goethals Monument in 2009
- Interactive map of Goethals Monument
- Location: Panama City, Panama
- Coordinates: 8.958496°N 79.555628°W

The Goethals Monument in a monument in Panama City, Panama. It was constructed in honor of George Washington Goethals, the chief engineer of the Panama Canal and United States Army General. He also was the State Engineer of New Jersey and the Acting Quartermaster General of the United States Army in World War I.

It was designed by Alfred P. Shaw of Chicago and was built by the Martinz de Panamá construction company.

The monument is a white Vermont marble construction and was revealed to the public on March 31, 1954. Its central high part symbolizes the Continental Divide and the piles on the sides represent the Canal locks, from which the waters of Gatun Lake reach the oceans.

Al mayor general George W. Goethals
Ingeniero Jefe del
Canal de Panamá
Maestro~constructor≈
ingeniero genial
hombre de visión.
Este monumento es
dedicado≈por sus
compatriotas

Translation:

To Major General George W. Goethals
Chief Engineer of the
Panama Canal
Master~builder≈
great engineer
and visionary.
This monument is
dedicated (to you) by
your fellow countrymen.
