= Cinta Costera =

Land reclamation project in Panama

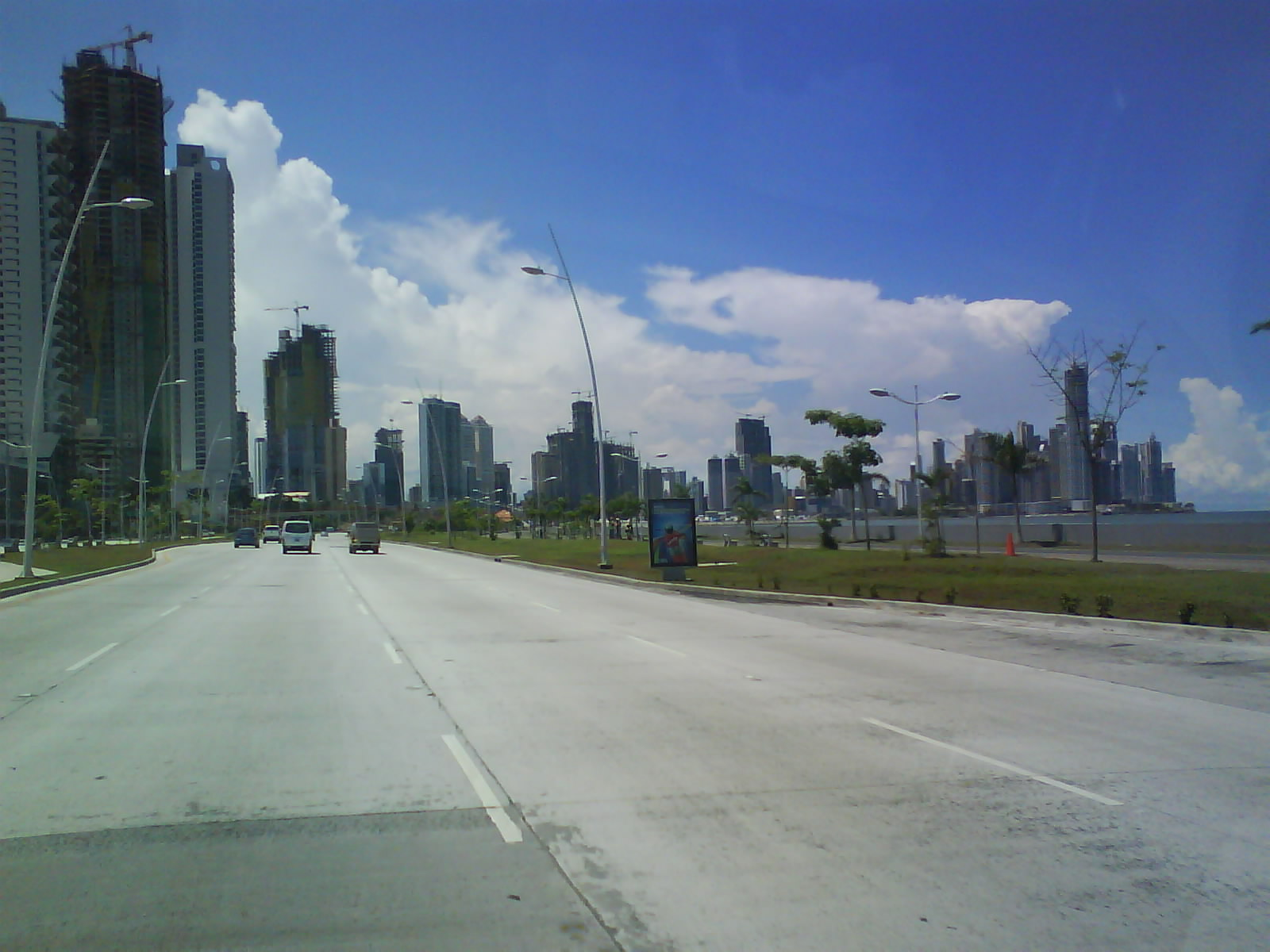
Cinta Costera Panamá

The Cinta Costera (meaning Coastal Beltway) is a 26-hectare (64-acre) land reclamation project in Panama City, Panama, completed in 2009 at a cost of $189 million. It extends from Paitilla to El Chorrillo. Its most recent expansion was the Cinta Costera III, which opened in 2014, along with the Maracana Stadium.

The Cinta Costera Viaduct is part of Cinta Costera Phase III. Consisting of a roadway bridge and pedestrian bridge, the 2.5-kilometer-long marine viaduct encircles Panama City's historic and governmental district of the Casco Antiguo. The viaduct surrounds the World Heritage Site-Archaeological Site of Casco Viejo, Panama and Historic District of Panama, as defined by the United Nations (UNESCO).
