= Amazing Race Suomi season 3 =

Amazing Race Suomi
- Season 3
- Presented by: Heikki Paasonen
- No. of days: 26
- No. of teams: 11
- Winners: Maria Guzenina & Vilma Vähämaa
- No. of legs: 12
- Distance traveled: 27,000 km (17,000 mi)
- No. of episodes: 12

Release
- Original network: Nelonen
- Original release: 15 November 2025 – 14 February 2026

Additional information
- Filming dates: 3 May – 28 May 2025

Series chronology
- ← Previous; Season 2 Next → Season 4

This is the third season of Amazing Race Suomi (English: Amazing Race Finland), a Finnish reality competition show based on the American series The Amazing Race. Hosted by Heikki Paasonen, it features eleven teams of two, each with a pre-existing relationship and including at least one celebrity contestant, competing in a race around Eurasia to win €30,000. This season visited two continents and six countries, travelling approximately 27,000 kilometres (17,000 mi) over twelve legs. Filming took place from 3 May to 28 May 2025. Starting in Helsinki, racers travelled through Cambodia, Thailand, Sri Lanka, Nepal and Greece, before returning to Finland and finishing in Helsinki. The season premiered on 15 November 2025, much later than the previous seasons due to EuroBasket 2025, on Nelonen and concluded on 14 February 2026.

Senior and junior in politics Maria Guzenina and Vilma Vähämaa were the winners of this season, while coworkers Millu Haataja and Karo Tuominen finished in second place, and son-in-law and father-in-law Tomas Grekov and Esko Rotola-Pukkila finished in third place.

== Production ==
=== Development and filming ===
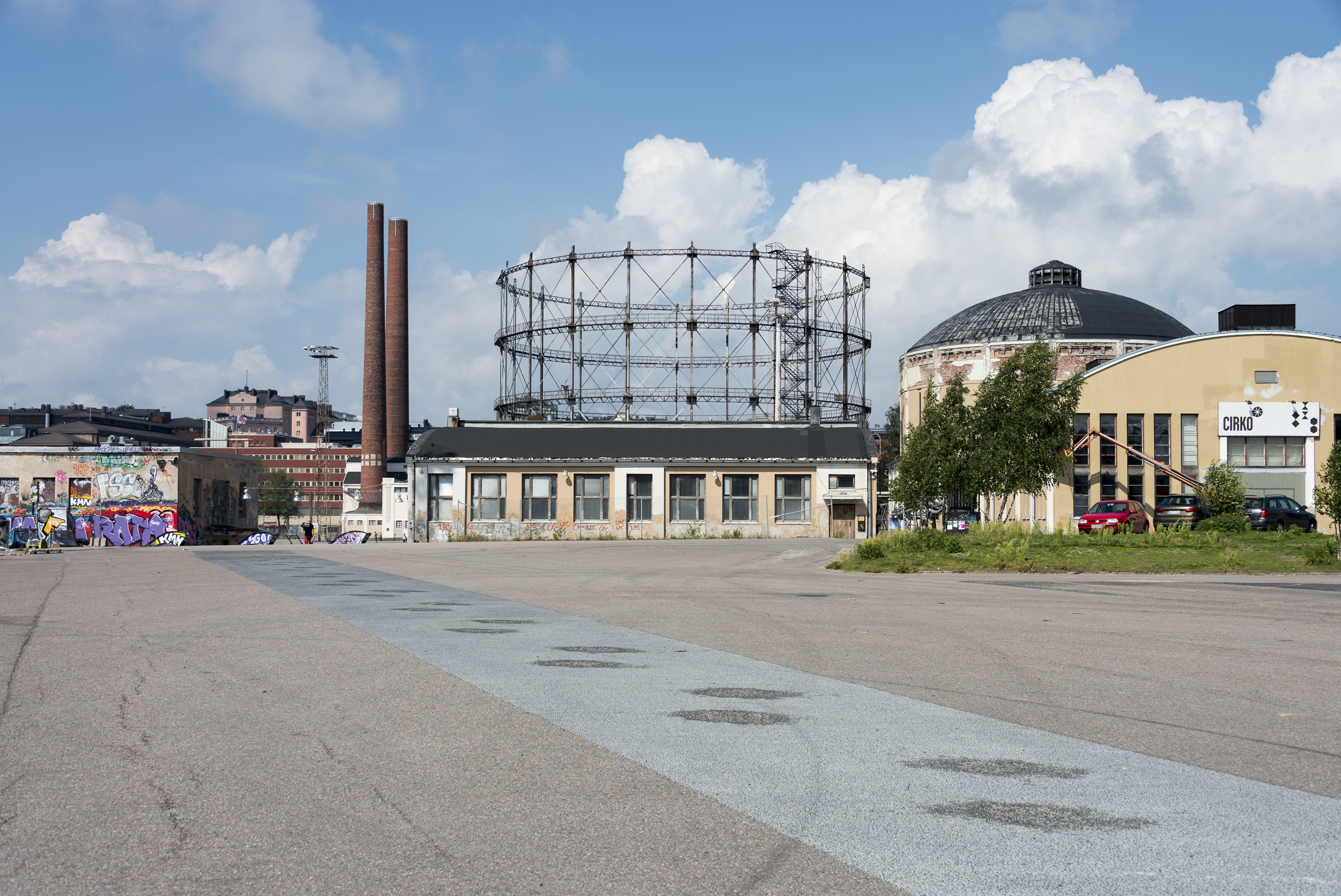
Eleven teams began the third season at the Suvilahti cultural center in Helsinki.

On 3 May 2025, Nelonen announced that Amazing Race Suomi was renewed for a third season with production beginning on the same morning at the Suvilahti cultural center in Helsinki. Host Heikki Paasonen announced on his Instagram page that the filming had concluded after 26 days on 28 May 2025.

The Express Pass from the previous season returned and was awarded to the first place team during two legs with the recipients having to use it within the span of three legs.

The seventh episode featured a firewalking task during which Sara Sieppi, Artturi Sieppi and Karoliina Tuominen received burns on their feet that required treatment even after filming concluded. In a statement from executive producer Pauliina Koutala, she explained that each task on the show is thoroughly tested for safety but acknowledged that the coals did become too hot for novice firewalkers at times.

=== Casting ===
Casting for this season took place at the end of 2024.

== Release ==
=== Broadcast ===
Upon the start of the production, the third season of Amazing Race Suomi was announced to premiere in November 2025. Mirko Baas, the head of Nelonen's domestic content, stated that the season was delayed from its typical October premiere due to the network's coverage of EuroBasket 2025. The first trailer for the season was published on the show's website on 24 October 2025. The third season aired weekly until the sixth episode on 20 December, after which took a two-week hiatus before resuming its weekly airing until the finale on 14 February 2026.

This season of Amazing Race Suomi had a behind-the-scenes podcast called Amazing-podcast hosted by contestants Mia "Millu" Haataja and Karoliina "Karo" Tuominen with episodes released on Supla following the broadcast release of each television episode.

== Cast ==
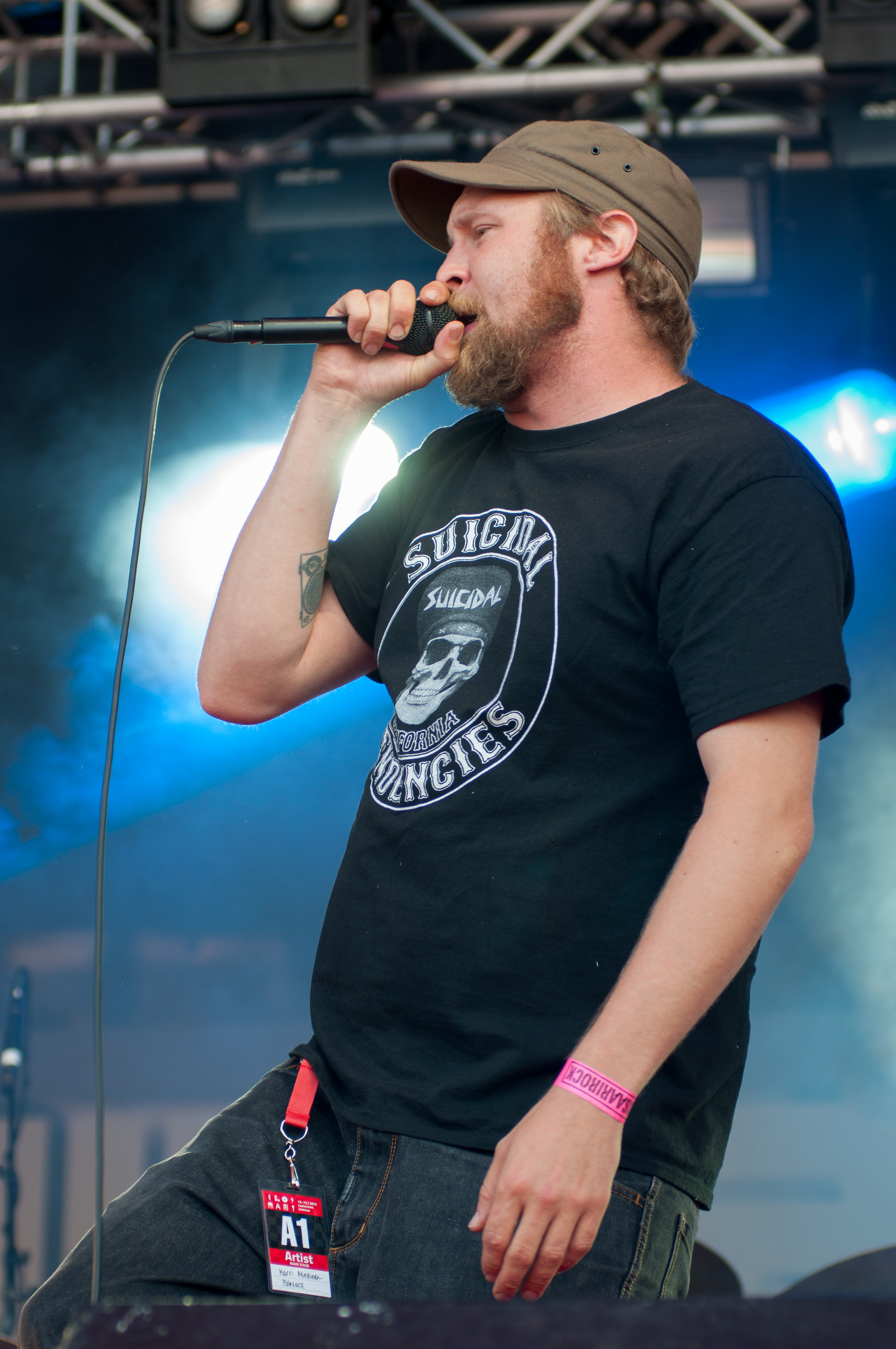
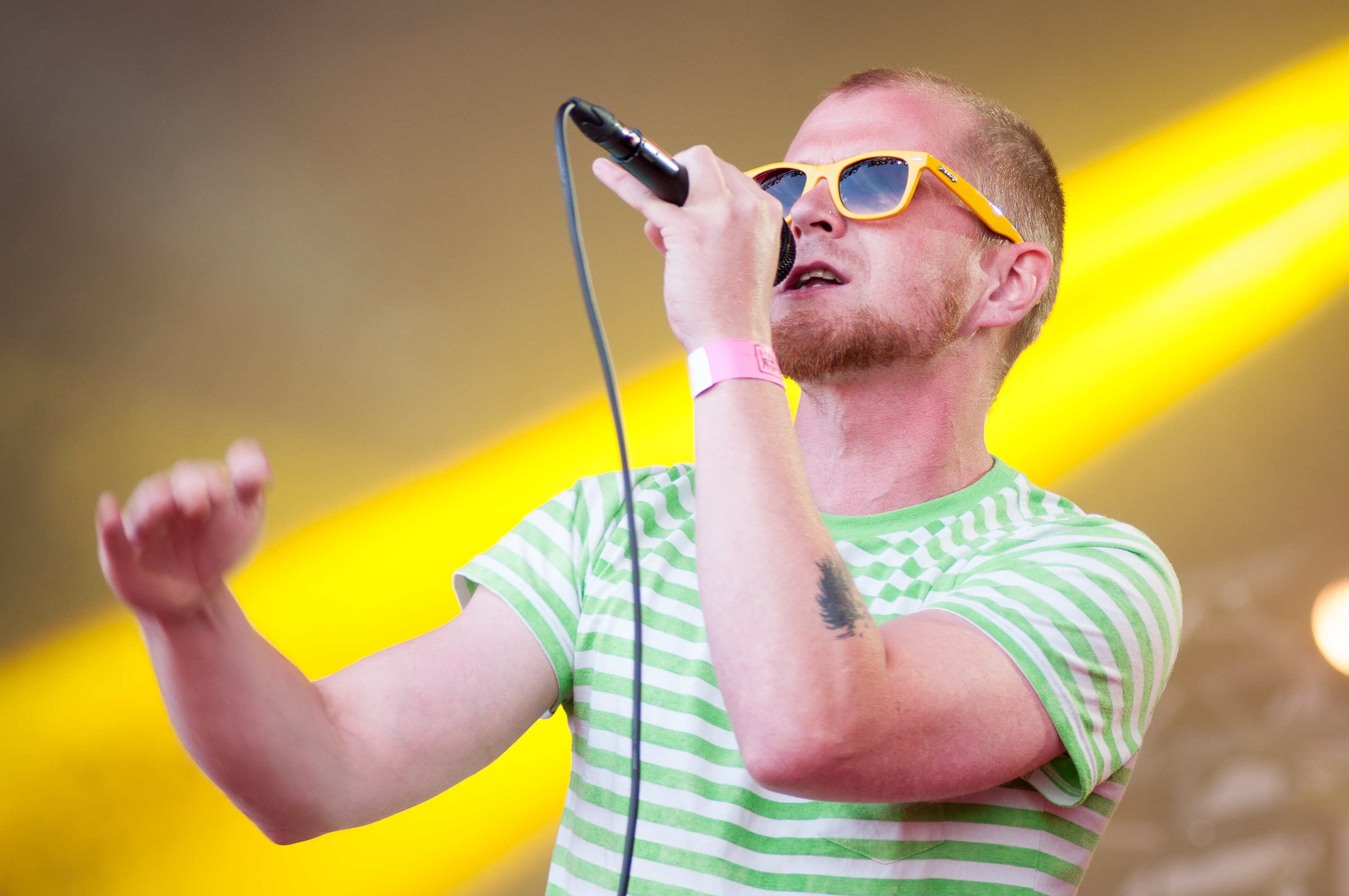
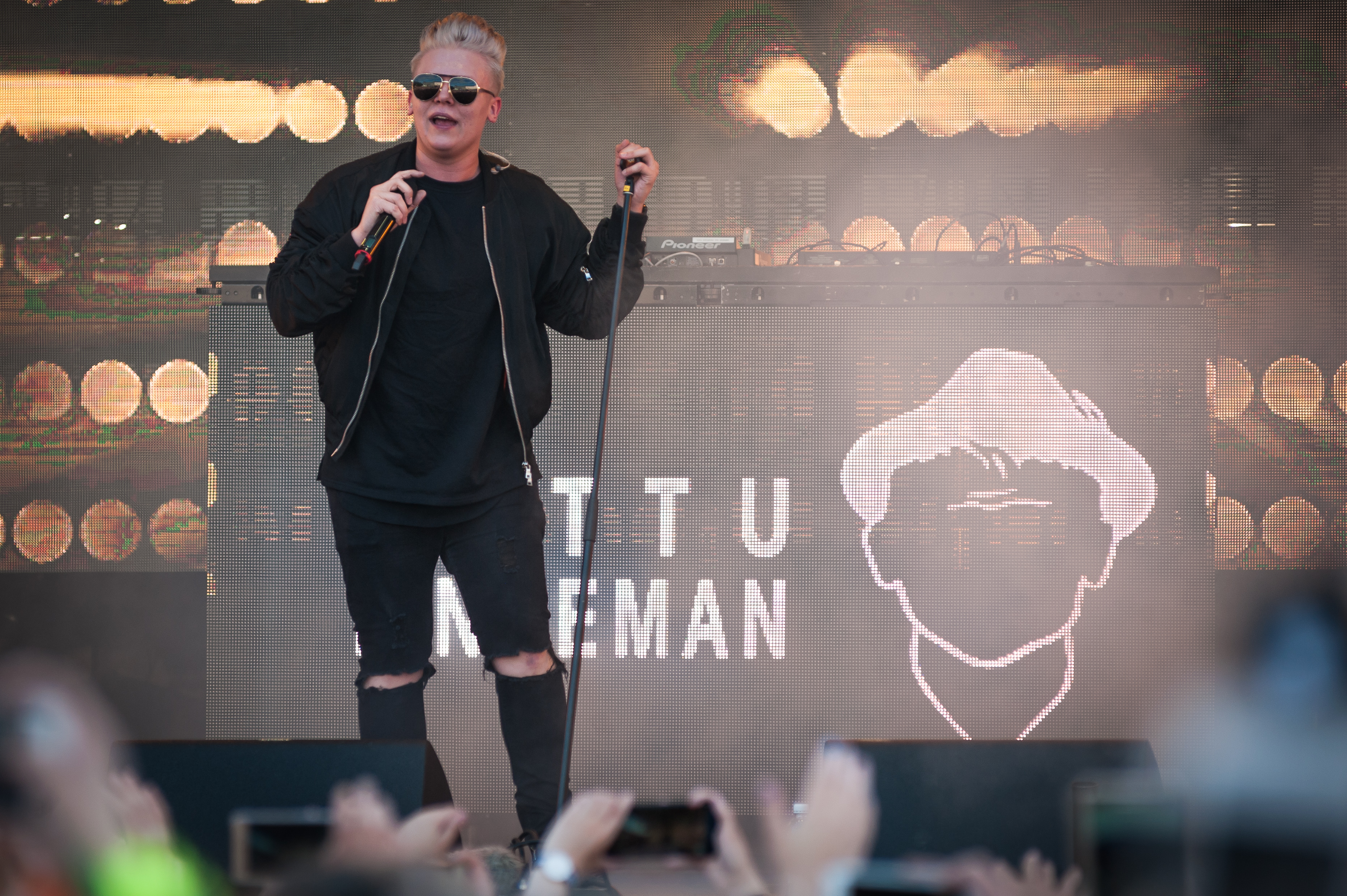
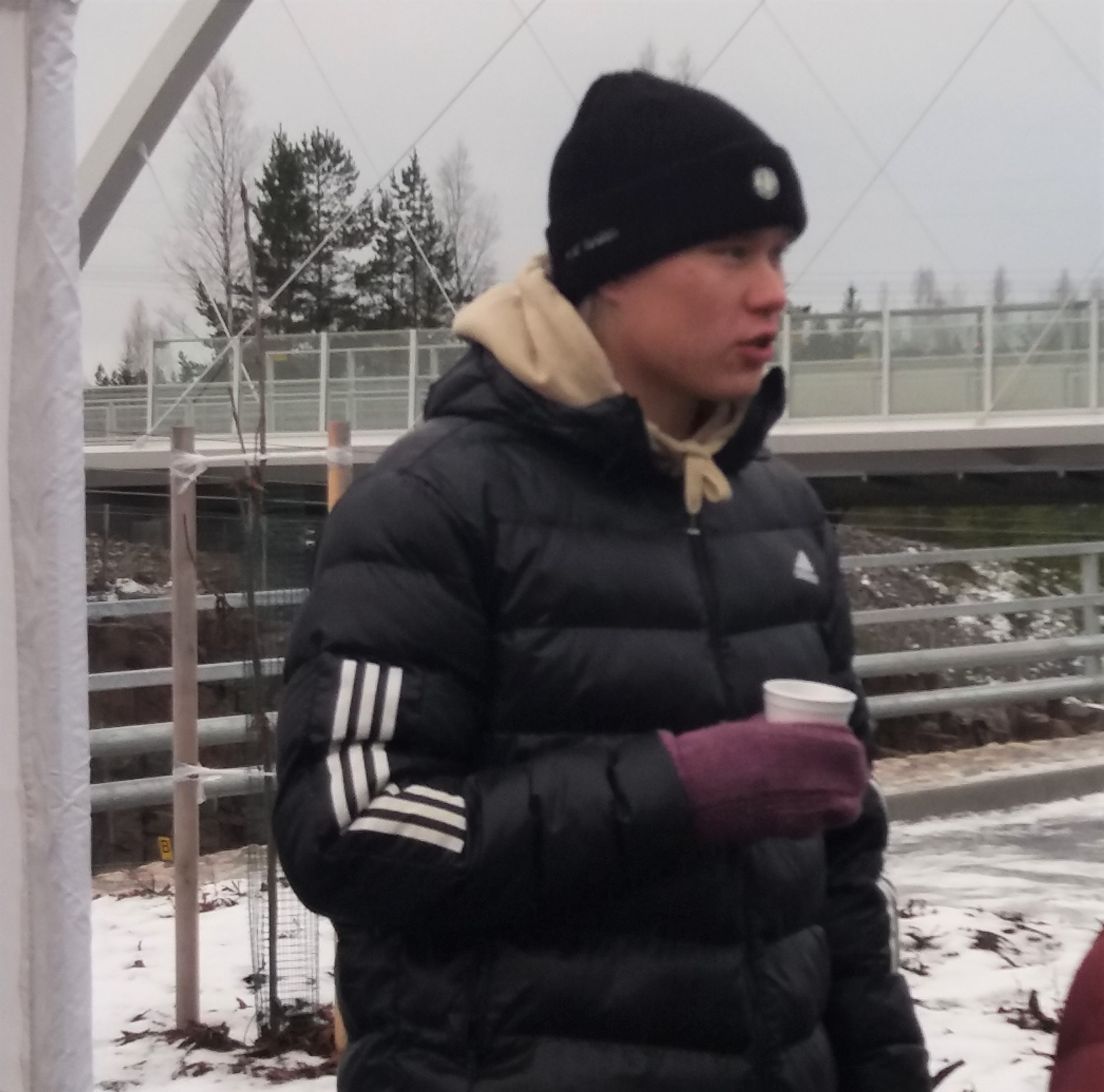
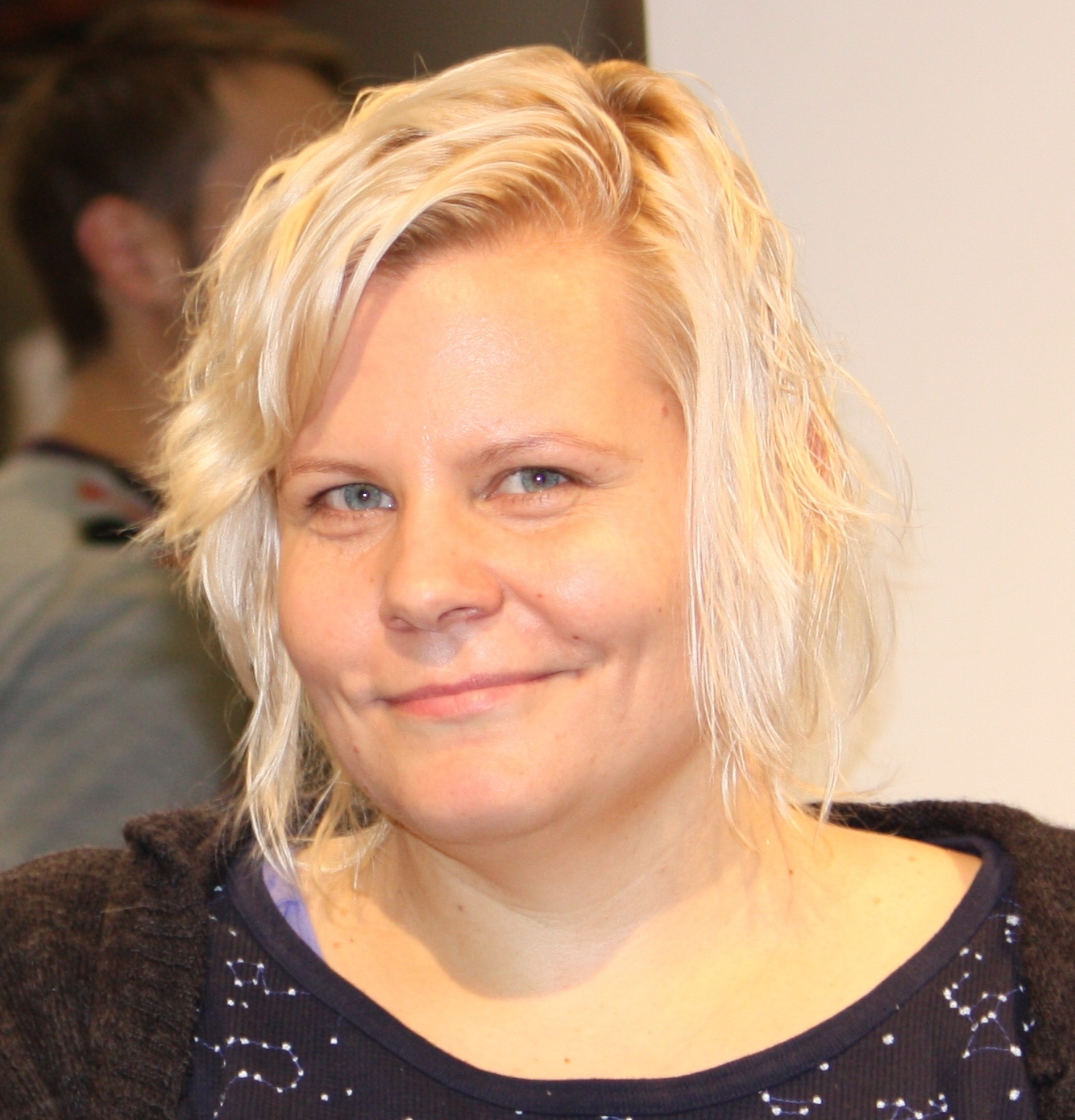
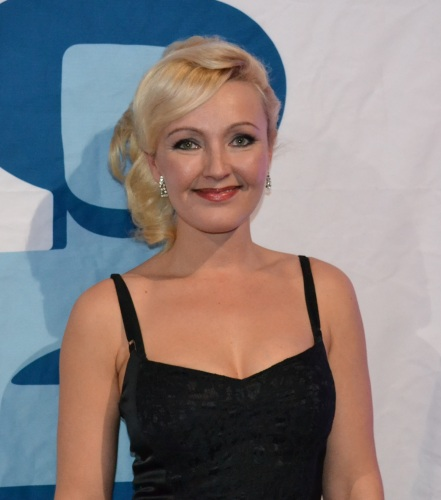
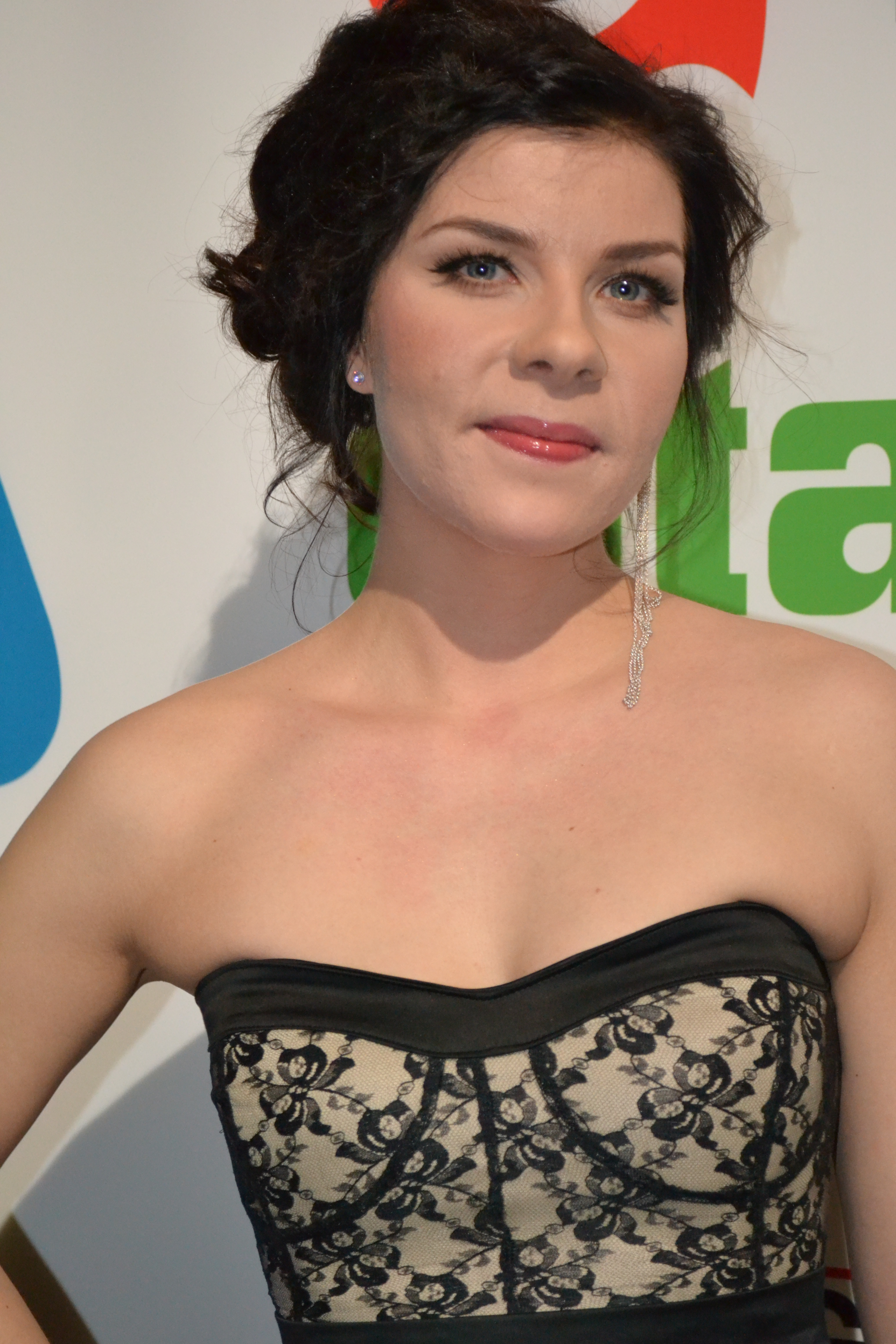
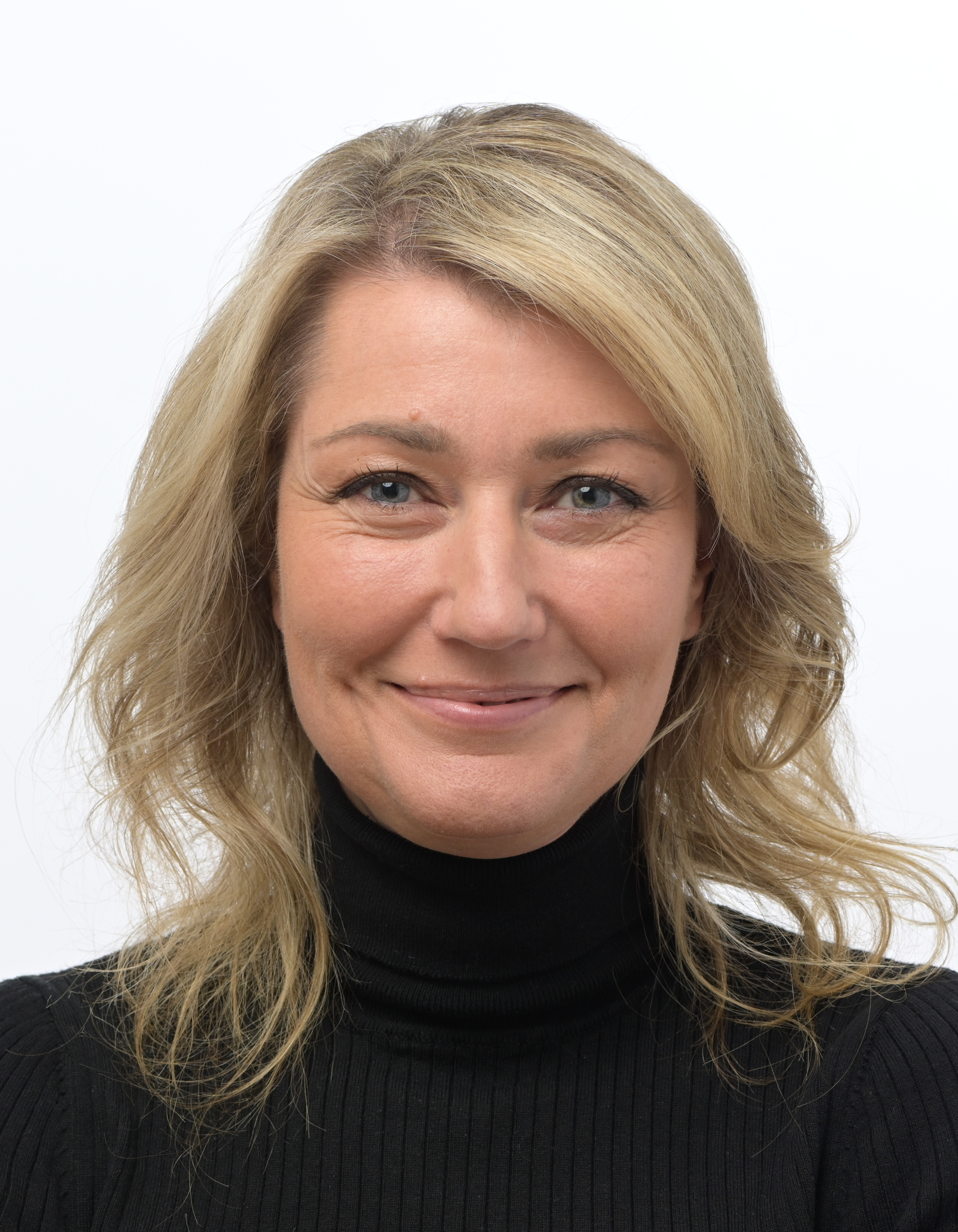
From left to right: Karri "Paleface" Miettinen, Tuukka "Leijonamieli" Rihkola, Arttu Lindeman, Jaakko Parkkali, Paula Noronen, Mari Hynynen, Armi Toivanen and Maria Guzenina

The cast for the third season consists of eleven Finnish celebrities and their relatives and/or friends.

| Contestants | Notability | Age | Relationship | Status |
|---|---|---|---|---|
| Karri "Paleface" Miettinen | Rapper | 47 | Rap Brothers | Eliminated 1st (in Siem Reap, Cambodia) |
| Tuukka "Leijonamieli" Rihkola | Rapper | 43 | Rap Brothers | Eliminated 1st (in Siem Reap, Cambodia) |
| Arttu Lindeman | Singer | 28 | Childhood Friends | Medically removed (in Chiang Mai, Thailand) |
| Jaakko Parkkali | YouTuber | 29 | Childhood Friends | Medically removed (in Chiang Mai, Thailand) |
| Paula Noronen | Writer | 51 | Best Friends | Eliminated 2nd (in Mae Hia, Thailand) |
| Kati Launiainen | —N/a | 49 | Best Friends | Eliminated 2nd (in Mae Hia, Thailand) |
| Nina Tapio | Singer | 53 | Mother & Daughter | Eliminated 3rd (in Kandy, Sri Lanka) |
| Elsa Forsberg | —N/a | 25 | Mother & Daughter | Eliminated 3rd (in Kandy, Sri Lanka) |
| Mari Hynynen | Actress | 55 | Mother & Son | Eliminated 4th (in Boralesgamuwa, Sri Lanka) |
| Joel Volanen | —N/a | 25 | Mother & Son | Eliminated 4th (in Boralesgamuwa, Sri Lanka) |
| Tuomas Peltomäki | Journalist & podcast host | 43 | Twins | Eliminated 5th (in Kirtipur, Nepal) |
| Sini Peltomäki | —N/a | 43 | Twins | Eliminated 5th (in Kirtipur, Nepal) |
| Armi Toivanen | Actress | 44 | Close Friends | Eliminated 6th (in Vouliagmeni, Greece) |
| Sari Majamaa | —N/a | 46 | Close Friends | Eliminated 6th (in Vouliagmeni, Greece) |
| Sara Sieppi | Television host & entrepreneur | 34 | Siblings | Eliminated 7th (in Aegina, Greece) |
| Artturi Sieppi | —N/a | 31 | Siblings | Eliminated 7th (in Aegina, Greece) |
| Tomas Grekov | Podcast host | 30 | Son-in-Law & Father-in-Law | Third place |
| Esko Rotola-Pukkila | —N/a | 63 | Son-in-Law & Father-in-Law | Third place |
| Mia "Millu" Haataja | Radio presenter on Loop | 32 | Coworkers | Runners-up |
| Karoliina "Karo" Tuominen | Radio presenter on Loop | 30 | Coworkers | Runners-up |
| Maria Guzenina | Member of the European Parliament | 56 | Senior & Junior in Politics | Winners |
| Vilma Vähämaa | Citizen of the Year 2018 | 32 | Senior & Junior in Politics | Winners |

== Results ==
The following teams are listed with their placements in each leg. Placements are listed in finishing order.

- A red placement with a dagger (†) indicates that the team was eliminated.
- A blue placement with a double-dagger (‡) indicates that the team was the last to arrive at a Pit Stop in a non-elimination leg, and had to perform a Speed Bump task in the subsequent leg.
- A purple ε indicates that the team used an Express Pass on that leg to bypass one of their tasks.

Team placement (by leg)
| Team | 1 | 2 | 3 | 4 | 5 | 6 | 7 | 8 | 9 | 10 | 11 | 12 |
|---|---|---|---|---|---|---|---|---|---|---|---|---|
| Maria & Vilma | 2nd | 1st | 4th | 4th | 4th | 3rd | 3rd | 1st | 5th‡ | 3rd | 1st | 1st |
| Millu & Karo | 4th | 3rd | 3rd | 3rd | 5th | 5th | 4th | 4th | 4th | 2nd | 3rd | 2nd |
| Tomas & Esko | 3rd | 5th | 8th | 6th | 1st | 4th | 6th | 5th | 3rd | 4th | 2nd | 3rd |
| Sara & Artturi | 5th | 4th | 2nd | 5th | 2nd | 1st | 1st | 3rd | 1st | 1stε (Note: Sara & Artturi used their Express Pass to bypass the yomari task on this leg.) | 4th† | |
| Armi & Sari | 9th | 8th | 5th | 2nd | 3rd | 2nd | 2nd (Note: Armi & Sari initially checked into the Pit Stop first; however, they had to repair the damage to their lantern. Sara & Artturi arrived during this time, dropping them to second place.) | 2nd | 2nd | 5th† (Note: Armi & Sari initially finished 4th; however, they received a five-minute penalty as Sari helped Armi during the Roadblock. Tomas & Esko arrived during this time, dropping them to last place.) | | |
| Tuomas & Sini | 10th | 10th | 7th | 8th | 6th | 7th‡ | 5th | 6th† | | | | |
| Mari & Joel | 6th | 9th | 9th‡ | 7th | 7th (Note: Nina & Elsa and Mari & Joel initially finished 7th and 8th respectively; however, Mari & Joel received a time credit due to receiving incorrect instructions from their teacher during the raban task. Mari & Joel thusly finished in 7th place and Nina & Elsa were eliminated.) | 6th | 7th† | | | | | |
| Nina & Elsa | 1st | 2nd | 1stε (Note: Nina & Elsa used their Express Pass to bypass the Roadblock on this leg.) | 1st | 8th† | | | | | | | |
| Paula & Kati | 7th | 6th | 6th | 9th† | | | | | | | | |
| Arttu & Jaakko | 8th | 7th | † (Note: After Jaakko developed a fever that required medical attention, he and Arttu were removed from the competition.) | | | | | | | | | |
| Karri & Tuukka | 11th‡ | 11th† | | | | | | | | | | |

== Race summary ==
| Destinations | Air travel Rail travel Water travel Bus travel Helicopter travel Bicycle travel Gondola travel |
| Route Markers | Kiertotie (Detour) Tiesulku (Roadblock) Express–Passi (Express Pass); Hidaste (Speed Bump) Etapin päätepiste (Pit Stop) |

=== Leg 1 (Finland → Cambodia) ===
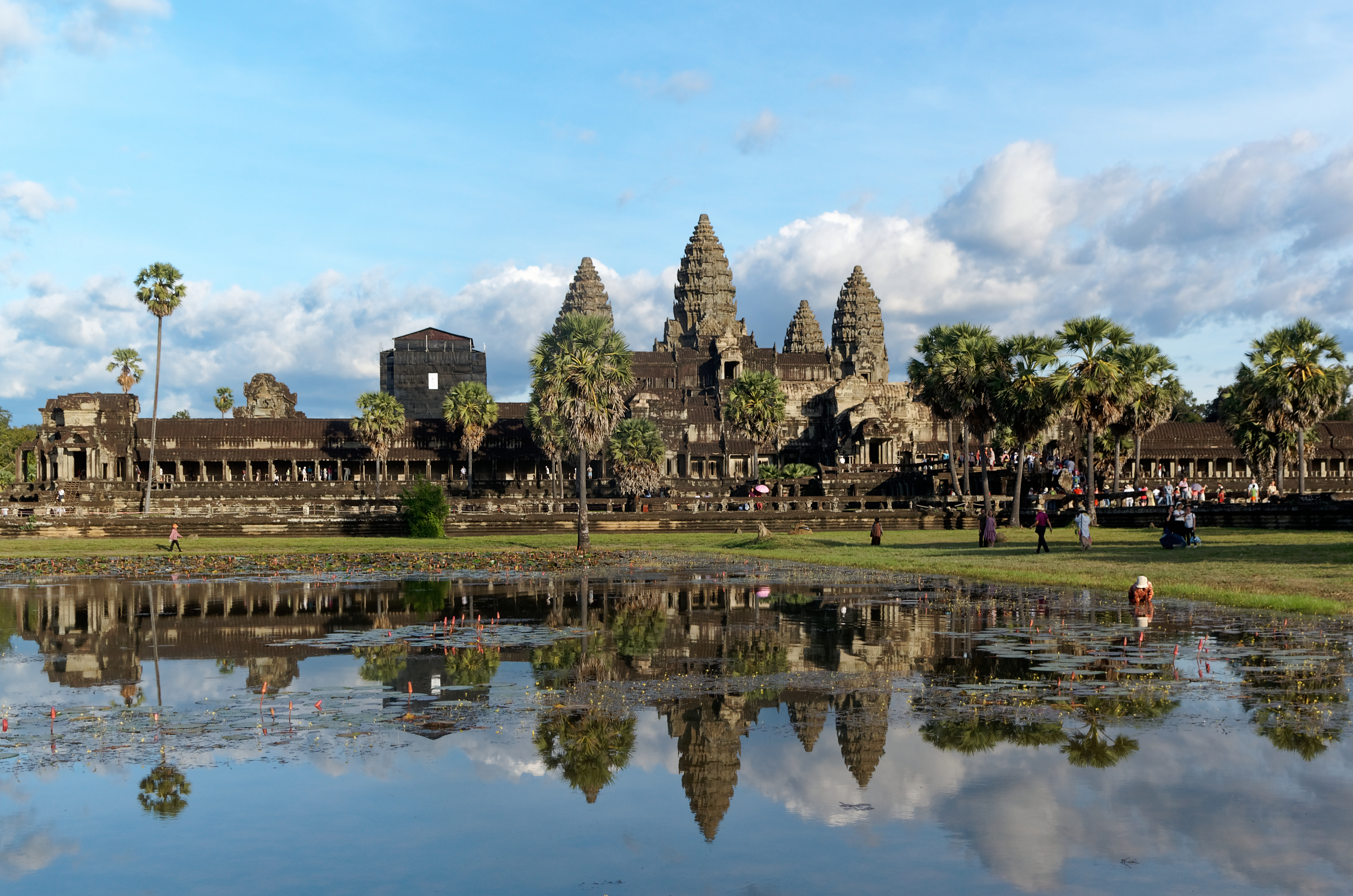
The first leg of the season saw the contestants visit the Angkor Wat temple in Siem Reap.

- Episode 1: "The Adventure Begins!" / Seikkailu alkaa! (15 November 2025)
- Prize: The Express Pass (awarded to Nina & Elsa)

Locations

- Helsinki, Finland (Sörnäinen – Suvilahti Culture Center) (Starting Line)
- Helsinki (Helsinki–Vantaa Airport) → Siem Reap, Cambodia (Siem Reap–Angkor International Airport)
- Siem Reap (Royal Residence – Royal Independence Gardens)
- Siem Reap (Angkor Wat)
- Siem Reap (Phare Circus)
- Bakong (Royal Archery Club)
- Bakong (Bakong Temple)

Episode summary

- Teams began at the Suvilahti cultural center and had to search among over 1000 cardboard compass roses for one that pointed at 125° before learning their first destination: Siem Reap, Cambodia. Teams had to travel by bus, metro, tram or taxi to the airport with only 25 euros provided and choose a departure number in the ticketing hall.
- After arriving in Cambodia, teams were released at the Royal Independence Gardens in the order they arrived at the airport. There, teams found their next clue which instructed them to travel by tuk-tuk to Angkor Wat. Teams then had to correctly identify and arrange the names of ten of the temple complex's landmarks on a map to receive their next clue, which directed them to Phare Circus.
- This season's first Detour was a choice between Alone (Yksin) or Together (Kaksin). In Alone, team members had to pass a diabolo in the air to each other to receive their next clue. In Together, team members had to continuously juggle three balls between themselves for thirty seconds while standing next to each other to receive their next clue from the circus' director.
- In this season's first Roadblock, teams had to travel to the Royal Archery Club, where one team member had to randomly select an animal image and shoot a corresponding cutout with a bow and arrow to receive their next clue, which directed them to the Pit Stop: the Bakong temple.

Additional note

- This was a non-elimination leg.

=== Leg 2 (Cambodia) ===
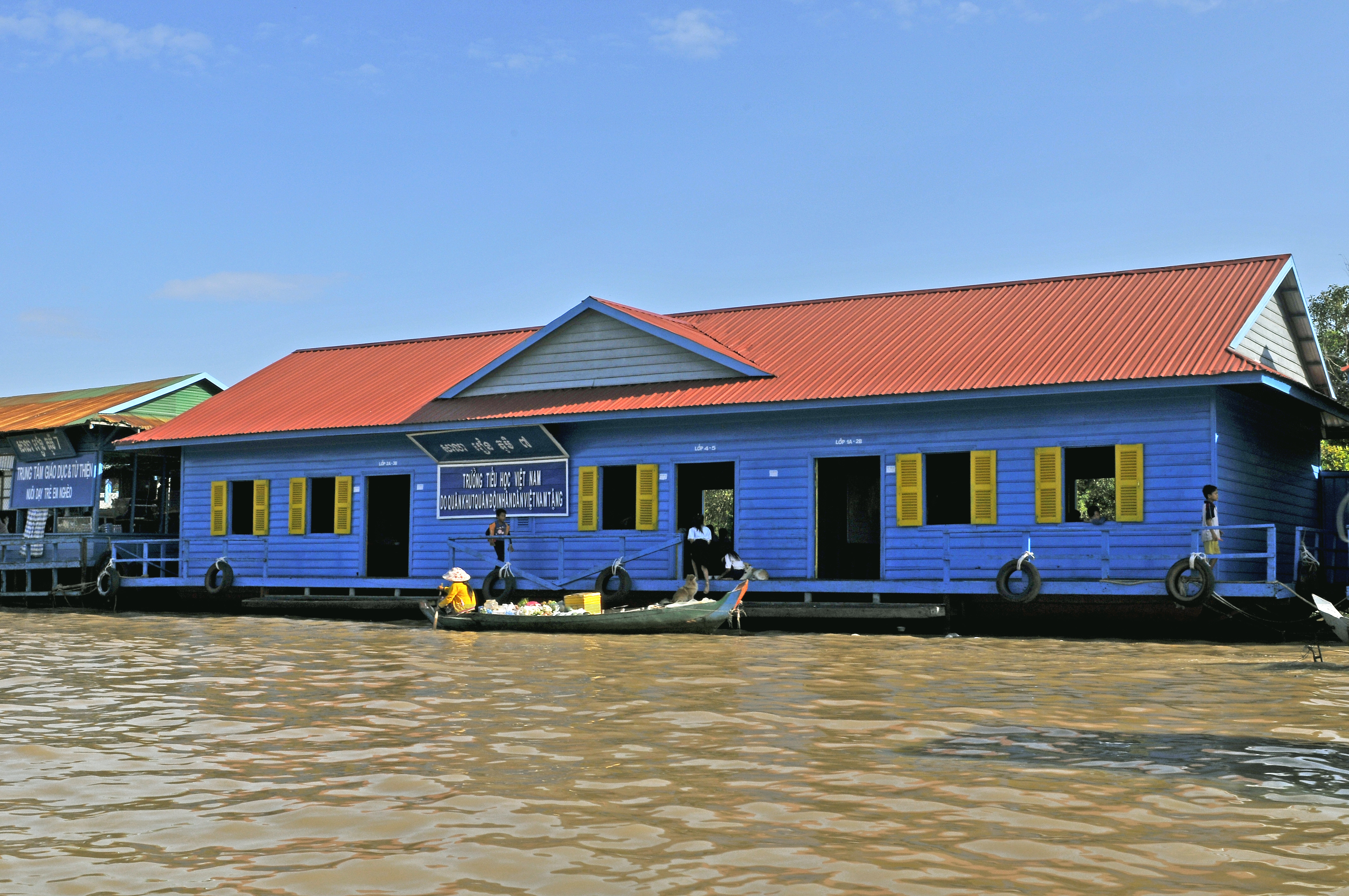
Teams visited a floating school on the lake Tonlé Sap.

- Episode 2: "Crickets Are Playing in the Forest" / Sirkat soittaa salolla (22 November 2025) (Note: This episode was released one week early for purchase on Ruutu+.)
- Eliminated: Karri & Tuukka

Locations

- Siem Reap (Angkor Century Resort & Spa)
  - Siem Reap (Cambodian People's Party Building & Phalla Furniture Shop)
- Siem Reap (Pteah Changret Spoan)
- Siem Reap (Khvet Siem Reap)
- Siem Reap (Chong Khneas Pier) → Tonlé Sap (Chong Khneas – Floating Primary School)
- Siem Reap (Lotus Silk Farm)
- Siem Reap (Wat Damnak)

Episode summary

- At the start of this leg, teams were instructed to travel to the Pteah Changret Spoan cricket farm and fill a bucket with three kilograms of crickets before receiving their next clue. Teams then had to travel to the Khvet restaurant and eat a plate of fried crickets before receiving their next clue.
- For their Speed Bump, Karri & Tuukka had to load and deliver a bicycle with brooms to the Phalla Furniture Shop before they could continue racing.
- From the restaurant, teams had to travel to the Chong Khneas pier, pick up one bag of rice, take a boat into Tonlé Sap and deliver the rice to the principal of a floating school in exchange for their next clue. Teams then had to sing "Old MacDonald Had a Farm" in Khmer before receiving their next clue, which sent them to a lotus farm.
- This leg's Detour was a choice between Flower (Kukka) or Bouquet (Kimppu). In Flower, teams had to search a lotus field for one tagged with an Amazing Race flag, which they could exchange for their next clue. In Bouquet, both team members had to fold the petals of ten lotus flowers in a specific pattern and arrange the flowers into two bouquets before receiving their next clue.
- After the Detour, teams had to check in at the Pit Stop: Wat Damnak.

=== Leg 3 (Cambodia → Thailand) ===
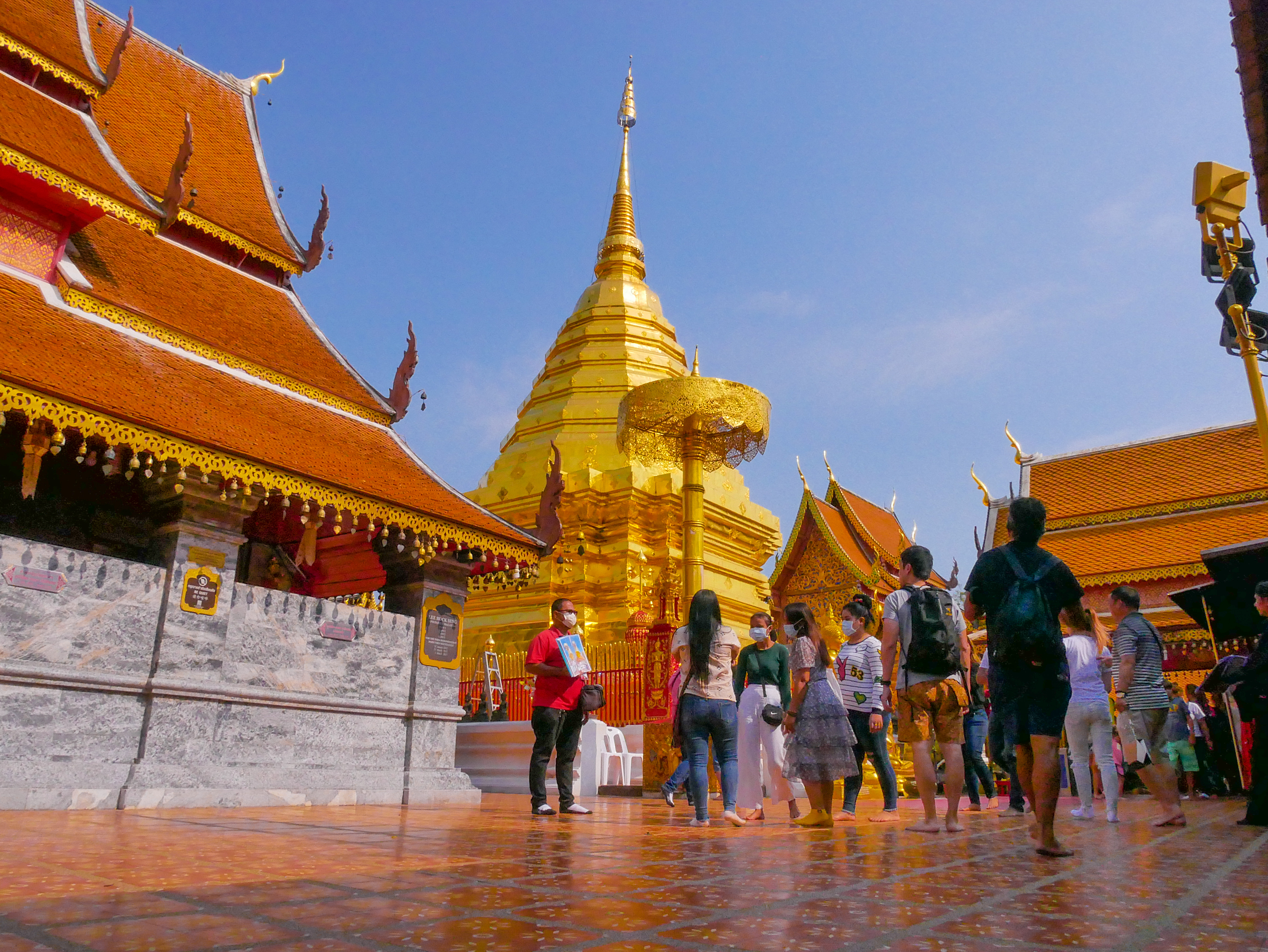
The third Pit Stop was located at Wat Phra That Doi Suthep.

- Episode 3: "Concentration on Test" / Keskittyminen koetuksella (29 November 2025)
- Prize: A vacation at the Minivilla Lapland in Hämeenlinna (awarded to Nina & Elsa)
- Medically removed: Arttu & Jaakko

Locations

- Siem Reap (Angkor Century Resort & Spa)
- Siem Reap (Siem Reap–Angkor International Airport) → Chiang Mai, Thailand (Chiang Mai International Airport)
- Chiang Mai (The Empress Premier Chiang Mai)
- Fa Ham (Coconut Market)
- Chiang Mai (Lanna Traditional House Museum)
- Don Kaeo (Huay Tueng Thao)
- Chiang Mai (Wat Phra That Doi Suthep – Viewpoint)

Episode summary

- At the start of this leg, teams were instructed to fly to Chiang Mai, Thailand. Once there, teams were released from The Empress Premier Chiang Mai in the order that they finished the previous leg. Teams then had to travel to the Coconut Market, carry coconuts using a basket and piece of bamboo, and fill a pitcher with coconut water to receive their next clue, which sent them to the Lanna Traditional House Museum.
- In this leg's Roadblock, one team member had to meditate while balancing bowls of water on their backhands and head for fifteen minutes to receive their next clue.
  - Nina & Elsa used their Express Pass to bypass the task.
- After the Roadblock, teams had to travel to Huay Tueng Thao reservoir and find their next clue by a Buddha statue.
- This leg's Detour was a choice between Rock (Rokkaa) or Build (Rakenna), each with a limit of five stations. In Rock, teams had to perform a bamboo dance called Lao Kra Top Mai to receive their next clue. In Build, teams had to build a bamboo raft, paddle into the reservoir to a towel rack and retrieve a towel, which they exchanged for their next clue.
- After the Detour, teams had to check in at the Pit Stop: the viewpoint of Wat Phra That Doi Suthep.

Additional note

- Jaakko developed a fever in Cambodia that worsened to the point of needing medical attention once he was in Thailand. Due to the risk of developing myocarditis, Jaakko was no longer cleared to continue racing resulting in his and Arttu's removal from the competition. Due to this, there was no additional elimination at the end of this leg.

=== Leg 4 (Thailand) ===
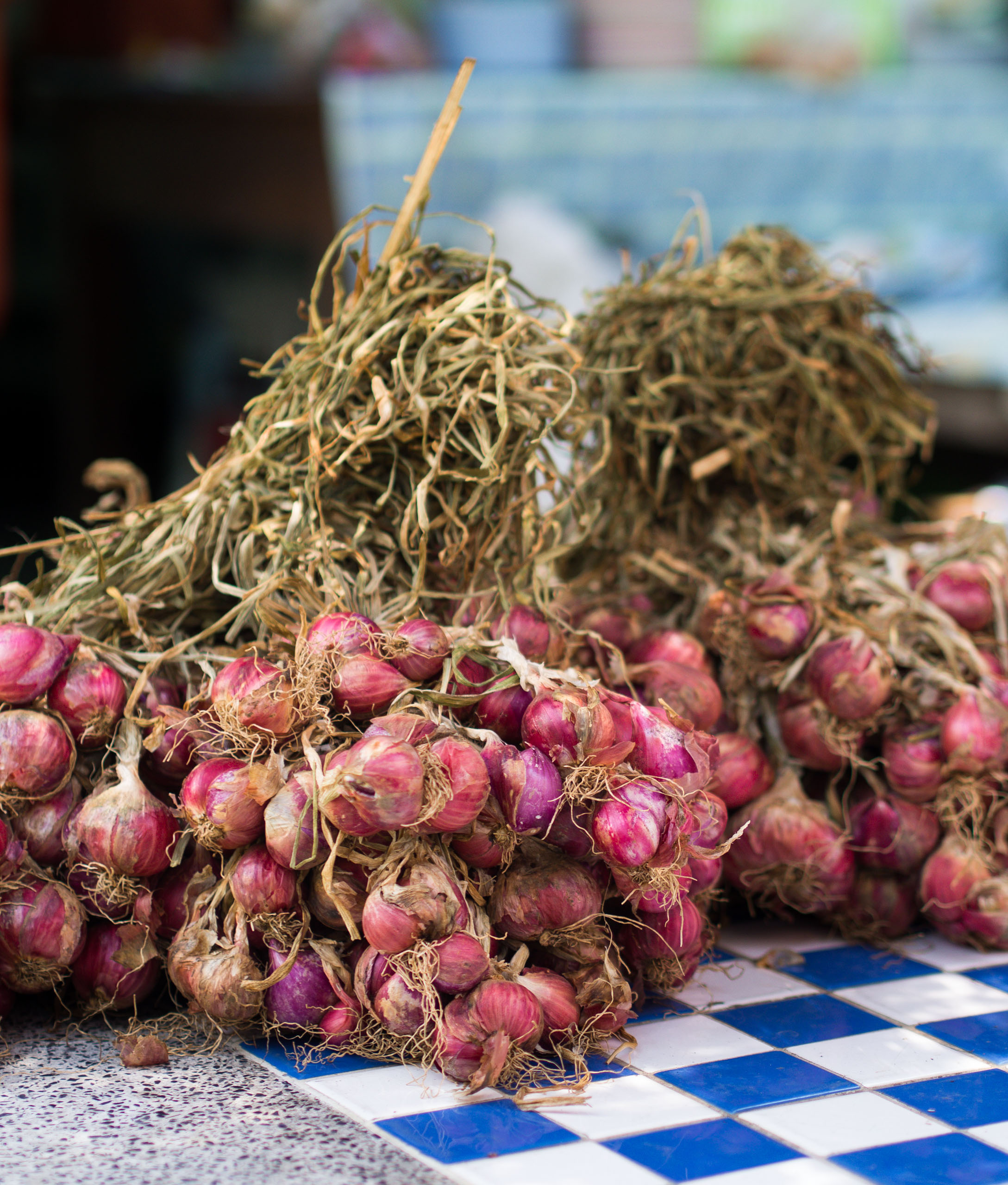
For one option in the Thai cuisine-themed Detour, teams had to peel shallots.

- Episode 4: "Challenging Details" / Haastavat yksityiskohdat (5 December 2025) (Note: Due to the network's Independence Day programming, this episode was aired one day prior to its usual schedule.)
- Eliminated: Paula & Kati

Locations

- Chiang Mai (The Empress Premier Chiang Mai)
  - Chiang Mai (Phoenix Massage)
- San Phi Suea (Hidden Village Chiang Mai)
- Chiang Mai (Rama IX Lanna Park)
- Ban Waen (Raunkaew-Yanon Family Home Host)
- Mae Hia (Royal Park Ratchaphruek)

Episode summary

- At the start of this leg, teams were instructed to travel to the Hidden Village Chiang Mai theme park and find the dinosaur exhibition. Once there, teams had to solve a tangram puzzle resembling a dinosaur to receive their next clue, which sent them to the Rama IX Lanna Park.
- For their Speed Bump, Mari & Joel had to travel to Phoenix Massage, where Joel had to assist a massage therapist in giving Mari a Thai foot massage before they could continue racing.
- In this leg's Roadblock, one team member had to choose a card that featured a species of snake, locate the same snake among various tanks containing different species and bring it to the expert to receive their next clue.
- After the Roadblock, teams had to travel to the Raunkaew-Yanon Family Home Host to find their next clue.
- This leg's Detour was a choice between Tom (ต้ม) or Tam (ตำ). In Tom, teams had to peel one kilogram of shallots to receive their next clue. In Tam, teams had to pound ingredients using a mortar and pestle and prepare a chili paste to receive their next clue.
- After the Detour, teams had to check in at the Pit Stop: Royal Park Ratchaphruek.

=== Leg 5 (Thailand → Sri Lanka) ===
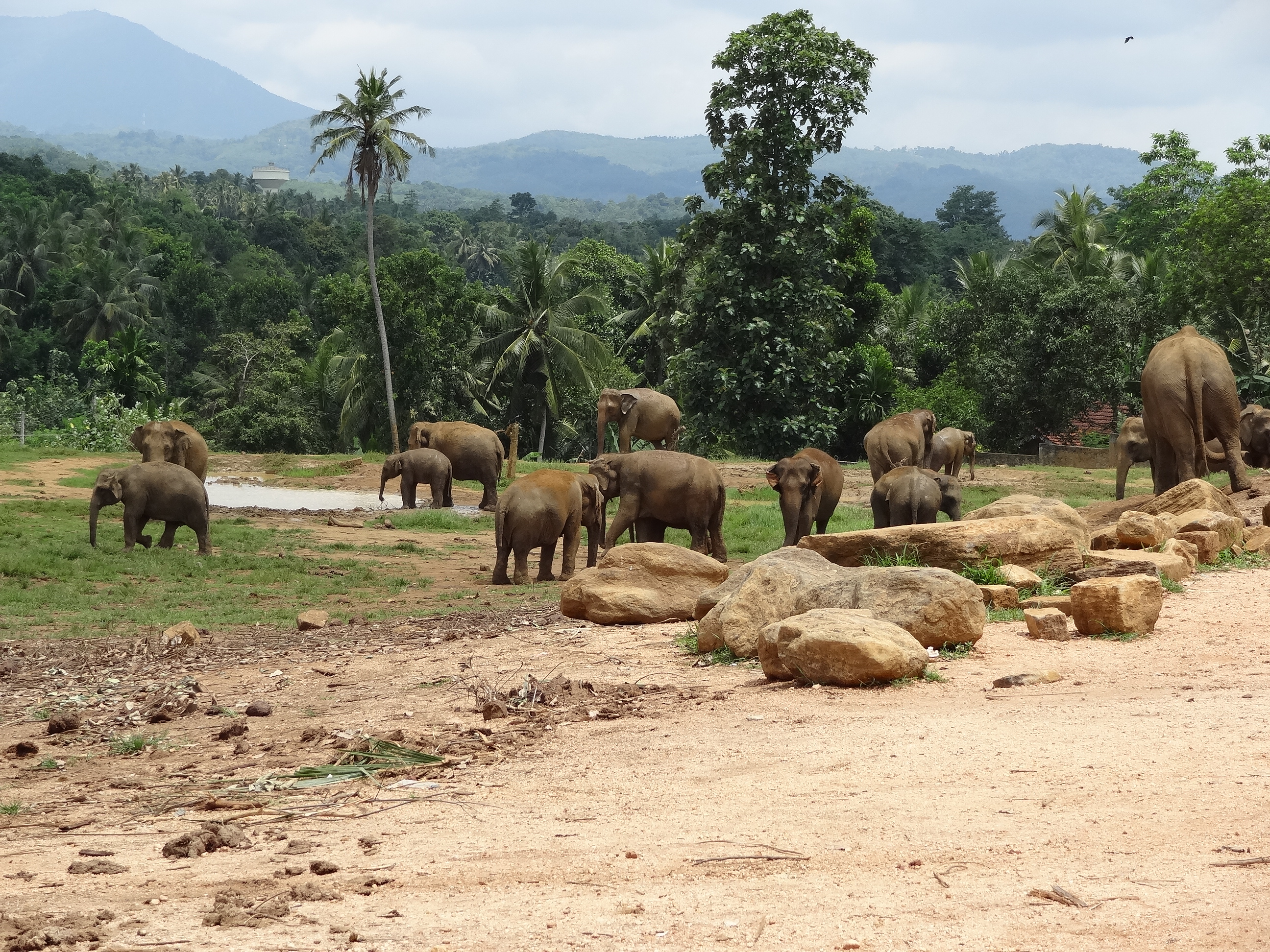
The Detour during the leg in Sabaragamuwa Province was set at the Pinnawala Elephant Orphanage.

- Episode 5: "Manure Work" / Lantahommia (13 December 2025)
- Eliminated: Nina & Elsa

Locations

- Chiang Mai (The Empress Premier Chiang Mai)
- Chiang Mai (Chiang Mai International Airport) → Colombo, Sri Lanka (Bandaranaike International Airport)
- Colombo (Cinnamon Lakeside Colombo)
- Colombo (Fort Railway Station) → Rambukkana (Rambukkana Railway Station)
- Molagoda (Jayapala Maha Vidyalaya)
- Pinnawala (Pinnawala Elephant Orphanage)
- Pinnawala (Iparanigama Theme Park or Pinnawala Elephant Orphanage)
- Gannoruwa (Gannoruwa Rajamaha Viharaya)
- Kandy (Royal Botanic Gardens)

Episode summary

- At the start of this leg, teams were instructed to fly to Colombo, Sri Lanka. Once there, teams were released from the Cinnamon Lakeside Colombo in the order that they finished the previous leg and had to travel by train to Rambukkana.
- In this leg's Roadblock, one team member had to shoot a hanging pot with a slingshot to receive their next clue.
- After the Roadblock, teams had to find their next clue outside of the Pinnawala Elephant Orphanage.
- This leg's Detour was a choice between Wall (Seinä) or Worksite (Savotta). In Wall, teams had to mix water buffalo manure and clay and fill in a wall to receive their next clue. In Worksite, teams had to completely clean an elephant enclosure to receive their next clue.
- After the Detour, teams had to travel to Gannoruwa Rajamaha Viharaya, where they had to perform a Kandyan dance that involved spinning three raban drums on a three-pronged pole before receiving their next clue directing them to the Pit Stop: the Royal Botanic Gardens.

Additional note

- Nina & Elsa elected to quit the raban dance task and had to wait out a 90-minute penalty before receiving their next clue. They then checked into the Pit Stop in seventh place; however, Mari & Joel received a time credit due to receiving incorrect dance instructions from their teacher during the same task. As a result, Nina & Elsa were eliminated.

=== Leg 6 (Sri Lanka) ===
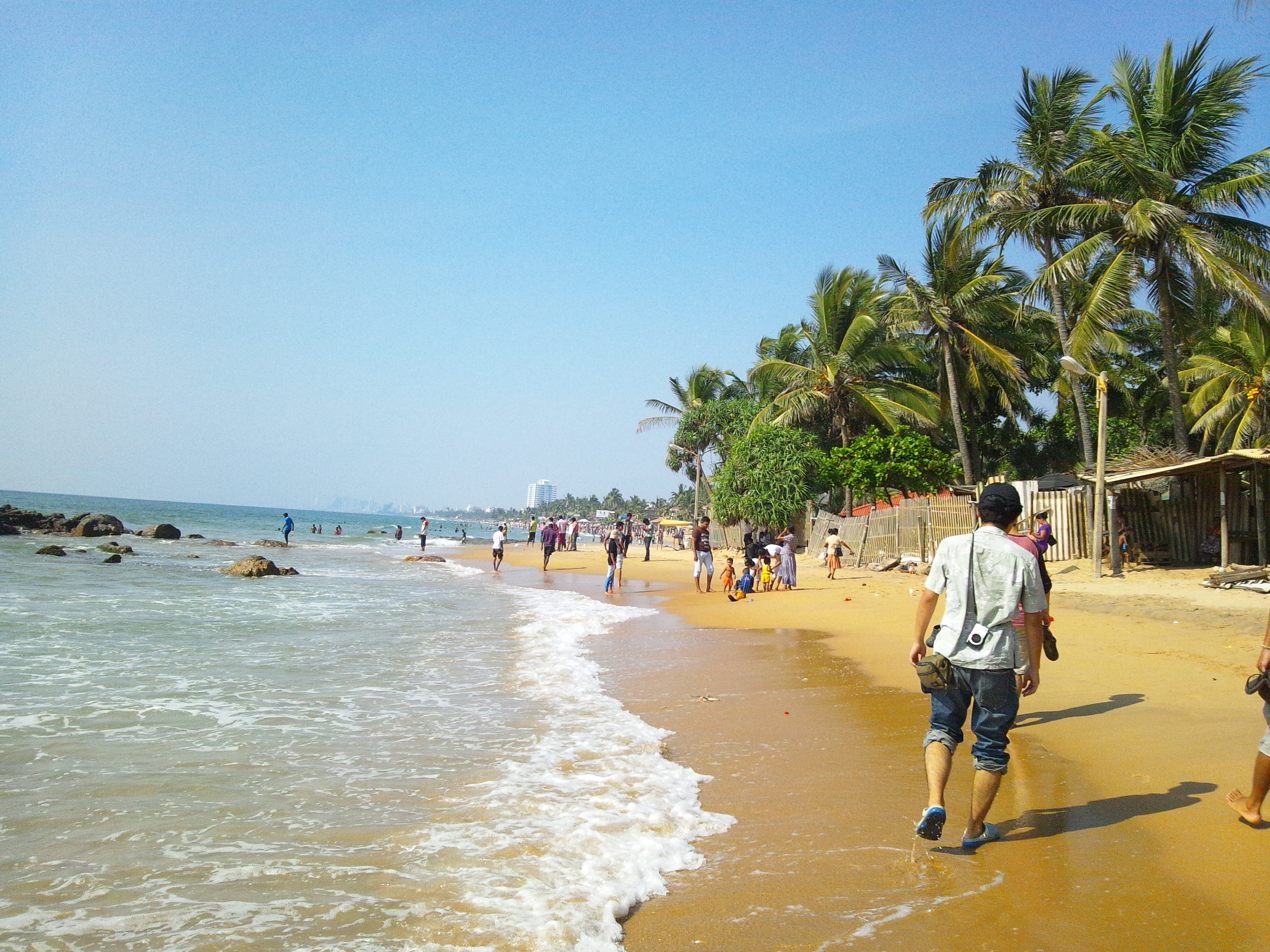
Heikki told teams that they were still racing on the Mount Lavinia beach.

- Episode 6: "A Lump in the Throat" / Pala kurkussa (20 December 2025)
- Prize: A vacation at the Villa Koivu in Lohja (awarded to Sara & Artturi)

Locations

- Colombo (Cinnamon Lakeside Colombo)
- Peliyagoda (New Manning Market)
- Colombo (Colombo Dutch Museum)
- Colombo (Pettah – Plaza Hotel & Bakes)
- Boralesgamuwa (B-Leaf Restaurant)
- Mount Lavinia (Mount Lavinia Beach)

Episode summary

- At the start of this leg, teams travelled back from Kandy to Colombo. Once there, teams were released from the Cinnamon Lakeside Colombo in the order that they finished the previous leg and were instructed to travel to the New Manning Market in Peliyagoda.
- This leg's Detour was a choice between Cubes (Kuutio) or Calculus (Kalkyyli). In Cubes, teams had to deliver together two ice blocks to a vendor to receive their next clue. In Calculus, teams had to count the number of fish in a bin to receive their next clue.
- After the Detour, teams had to travel to the Colombo Dutch Museum, where they found a treasure chest with a combination lock. Teams first had to travel by foot to Plaza Hotel & Bakes and ask for two Kimbula buns in Sinhala. Along with the pastries, teams received a question asking them to find the year that the Dutch took control of Sri Lanka from the Portuguese (1658) and use the numbers as a combination to unlock the chest with their next clue.
- In this leg's Roadblock, one team member had to roll two dice three times. The numbers on each die determined the food for a three-course meal of South Asian cuisine that racers had to eat before receiving their next clue, which directed them to the Pit Stop: the Mount Lavinia beach outside of the Berjaya Hotel Colombo.

Additional notes

- Millu & Karo received a 15-minute penalty for not carrying an ice block together during the Detour.
- There was no elimination at the end of this leg; all teams were instead instructed to continue racing.

=== Leg 7 (Sri Lanka) ===
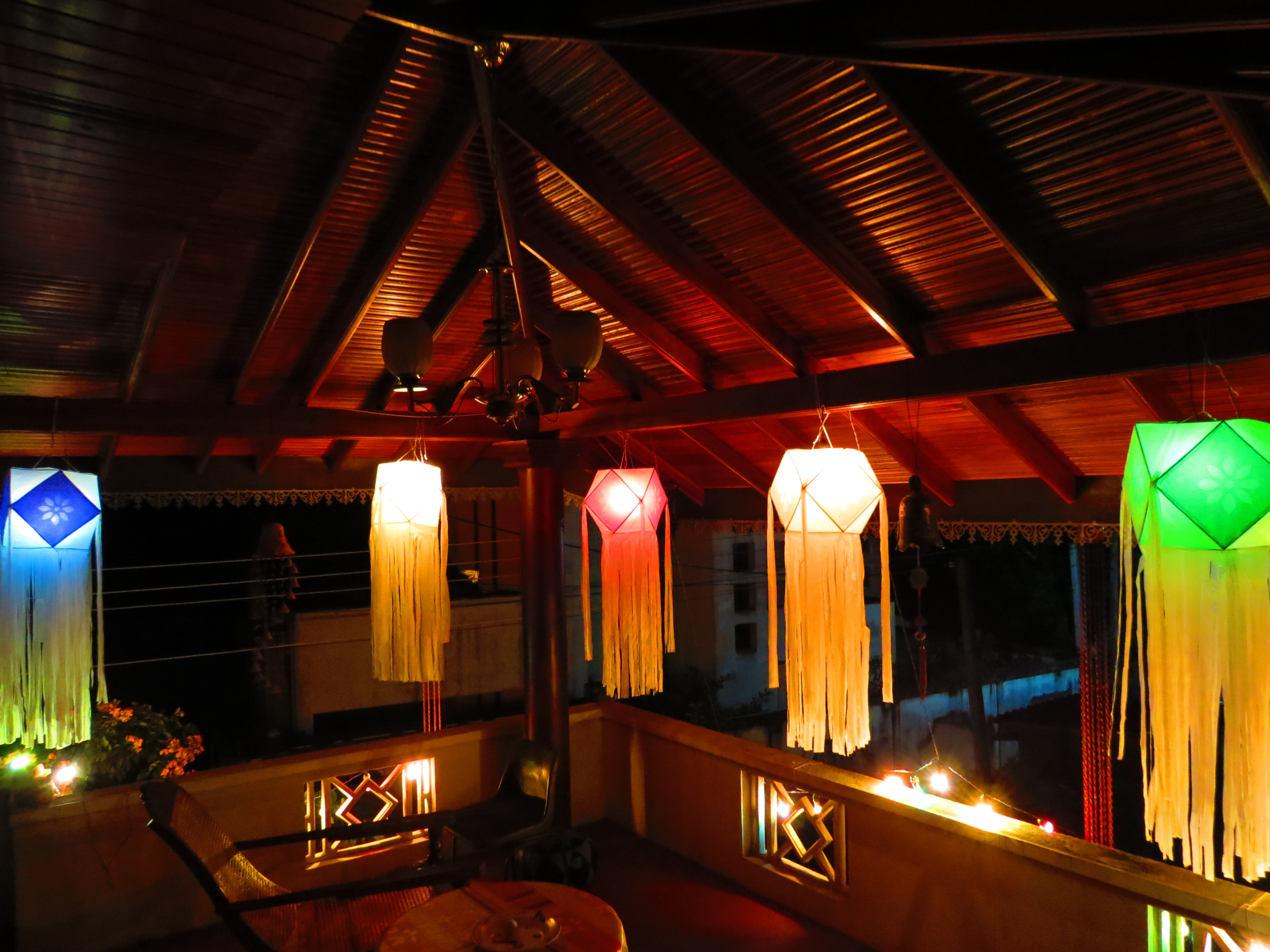
Teams first crafted Vesak lanterns that they had to bring to the Pit Stop.

- Episode 7: "The Race Heats Up" / Kisa kuumenee (10 January 2026)
- Prize: The Express Pass (awarded to Sara & Artturi)
- Eliminated: Mari & Joel

Locations

- Mount Lavinia (Mount Lavinia Beach)
  - Nugegoda (Nugegoda Supermarket – National Lotteries Board Kiosk)
- Sri Jayawardenepura Kotte (Diyasaru Park)
- Colombo (A.F. Jones Tea Warehouse)
- Panadura (Gangula Devalaya)
- Boralesgamuwa (Bellanwila Rajamaha Viharaya)

Episode summary

- After being told to continue racing, teams had to travel to Diyasaru Park and craft a Vesak paper lantern to receive their next clue. Teams had to keep their lantern for the rest of the leg.
- For their Speed Bump, Tuomas & Sini had to travel to a lottery kiosk near the Nugegoda Supermarket and sell 20 lottery tickets before they could continue racing.
- Teams had to travel to A.F. Jones Tea Warehouse and stack boxes of Ceylon tea so that they formed an image of a mask festival to receive their next clue. Teams then had to travel to Gangula Devalaya, where both team members had to firewalk over hot coals to receive their next clue.
- In this leg's Roadblock, one team member had to lie on a bed of nails to receive their next clue, which directed them to the Pit Stop: Bellanwila Rajamaha Viharaya.

=== Leg 8 (Sri Lanka → Nepal) ===
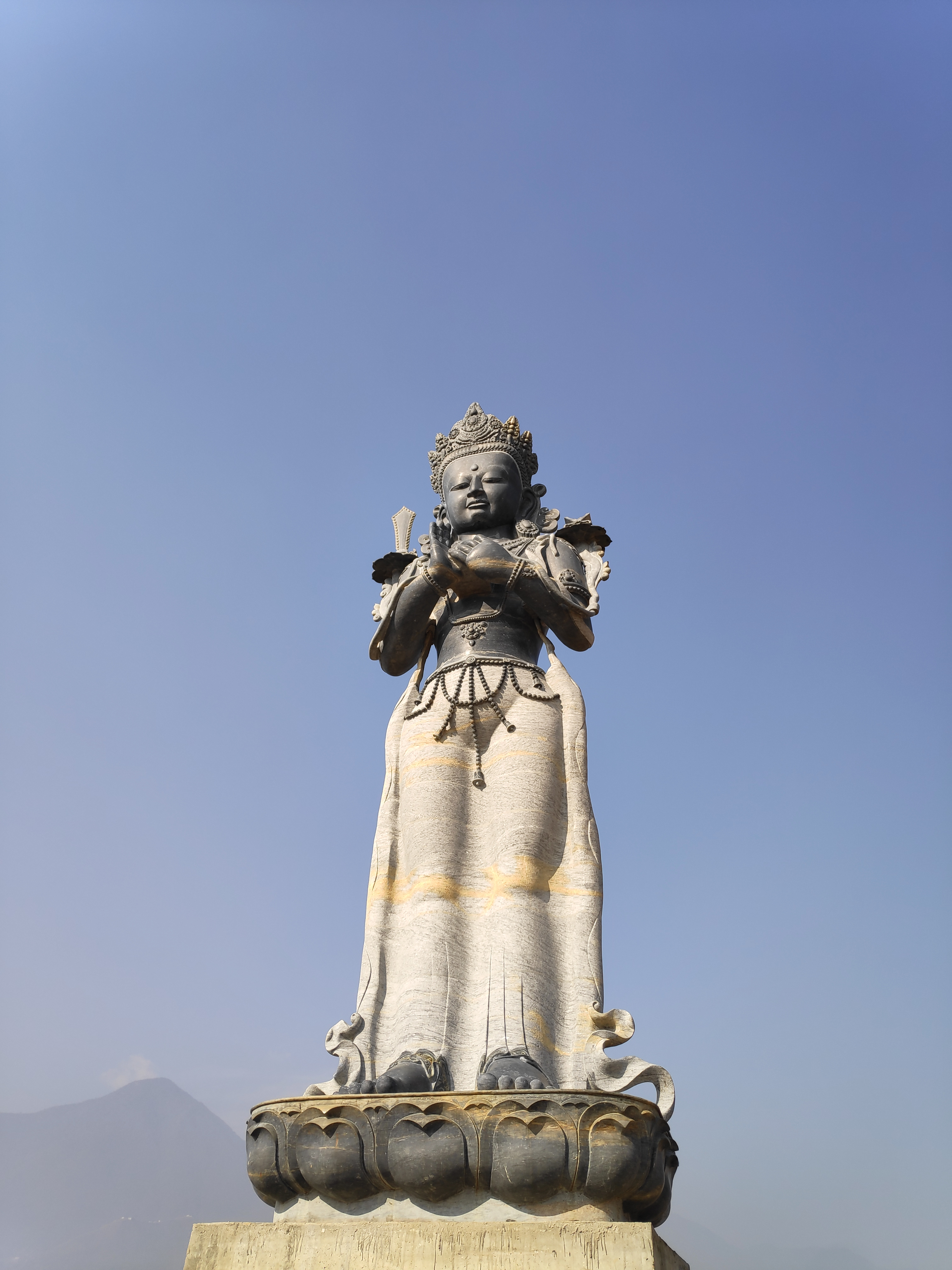
The eighth Pit Stop was located near the statue of Manjushri in Chobhar.

- Episode 8: "Mixing Placements" / Sijoitukset uusiksi (17 January 2026)
- Eliminated: Tuomas & Sini

Locations

- Colombo (Cinnamon Lakeside Colombo)
- Colombo (Bandaranaike International Airport) → Kathmandu, Nepal (Tribhuvan International Airport)
- Kathmandu (Hotel Crowne Imperial)
- Lalitpur (Patan Durbar Square)
- Lalitpur (Simhavarna Rajasri Vihar)
- Lalitpur (Agnishala Temple)
- Lalitpur (Agni Party Palace or Trilingeshowr Balkha Pagoda)
- Lalitpur (Mayur Varna Mahabihar)
- Kirtipur (Chobhar – Manjushree Park)

Episode summary

- At the start of this leg, teams were instructed to fly to Kathmandu, Nepal. Teams were then released from the Hotel Crowne Imperial in the order that they finished the previous leg and had to find their next clue at the hotel's terrace, which instructed them to travel to Patan Durbar Square.
- At Patan Durbar Square, teams received a list of items in transliterated Nepali that they had to purchase at Haugal Bahal and deliver them to a sadhu at Simhavarna Rajasri Vihar in exchange for their next clue, which sent them to Agnishala Temple.
- This leg's Detour was a choice between Groom (Sulhanen) or Bride (Morsian). In Groom, teams had to set up the tables for a Nepali wedding reception to receive their next clue. In Bride, teams had to randomly choose a henna tattoo design and have it painted onto their hands to receive their next clue.
- After the Detour, teams had to travel to Mayur Varna Mahabihar and construct a tower using wooden beams as tall as the sherpa's staff to receive their next clue, which directed them to the Pit Stop: Manjushree Park in the Chobhar area of Kirtipur.

=== Leg 9 (Nepal) ===
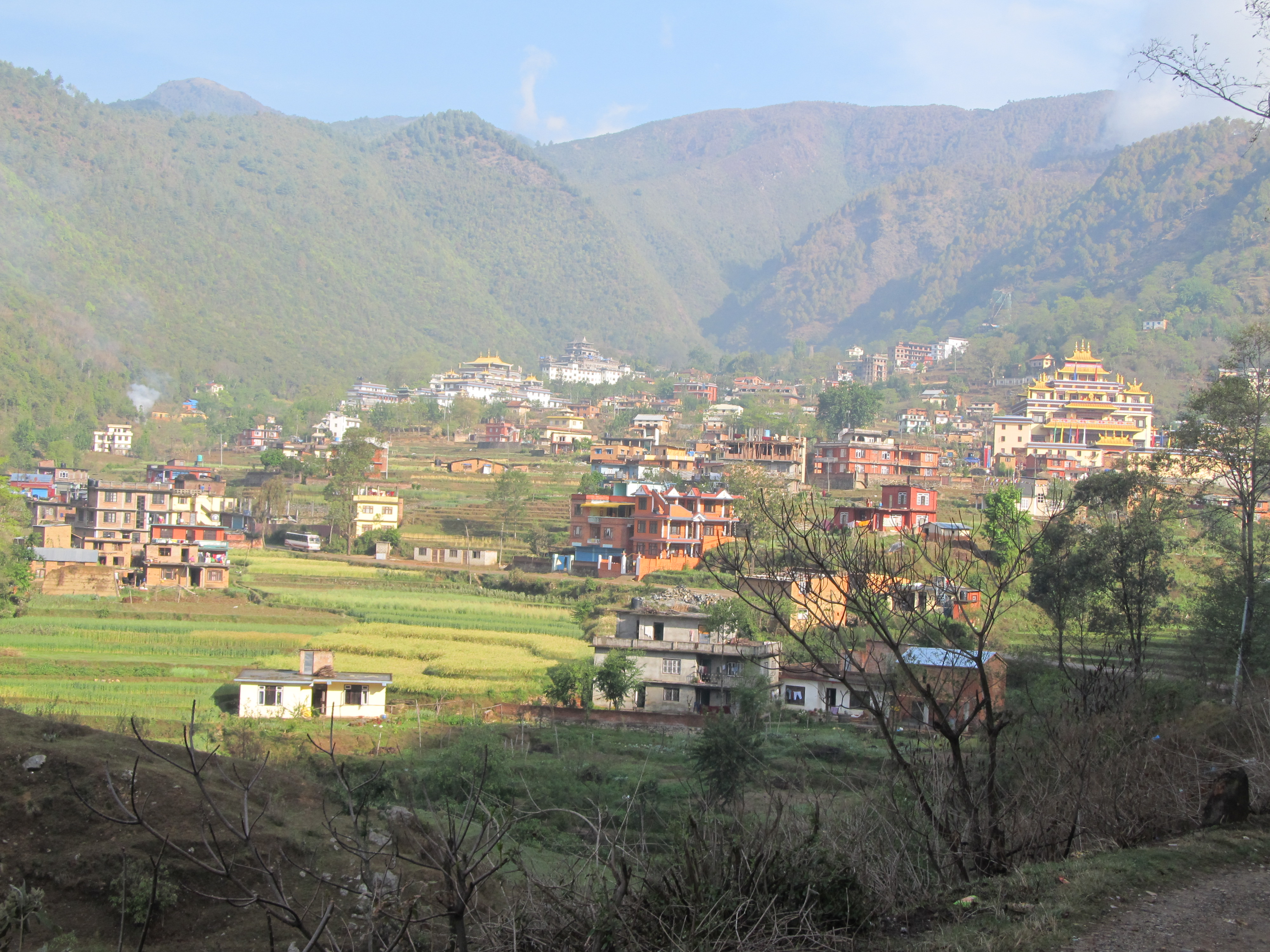
The city of Dakshinkali was the setting of the ninth leg.

- Episode 9: "Lost in the Countryside" / Eksyksissä maaseudulla (24 January 2026)

Locations

- Kathmandu (Nepal Academy of Tourism and Hotel Management)
- Dakshinkali (Pharping – Gopaleshwor-Setidevi Suspension Bridge)
- Dakshinkali (Talku Dudechaur – Hudu Village)
- Dakshinkali (Rigon Tashi Choeling Monastery)
- Dakshinkali (Pharping – Asura Cave)

Episode summary

- At the start of this leg, teams were instructed to travel by taxi to the town of Pharping and find their next clue on the Gopaleshwor-Setidevi Suspension Bridge. Teams then had to search among numerous prayer flags for one with their faces on it to receive their next clue, which sent them to Hudu Village.
- This leg's Detour was a choice between Hands (Kädet) or Legs (Jalat), each with a limit of three stations. In Hands, teams had to grind beans into enough flour using a jatho millstone to receive their next clue. In Legs, teams had to load two doko baskets with firewood and deliver it to a family to receive their next clue.
- After the Detour, teams found their next clue outside of the Rigon Tashi Choeling Monastery.
- In this leg's Roadblock, one team member had to choose a bowl of coins and drop the coins one at a time in front of a monk until they found a bowl with exactly 108 coins to receive their next clue, which directed them to the Pit Stop: Asura Cave.

Additional note

- There was no elimination at the end of this leg; all teams were instead instructed to continue racing.

=== Leg 10 (Nepal → Greece) ===
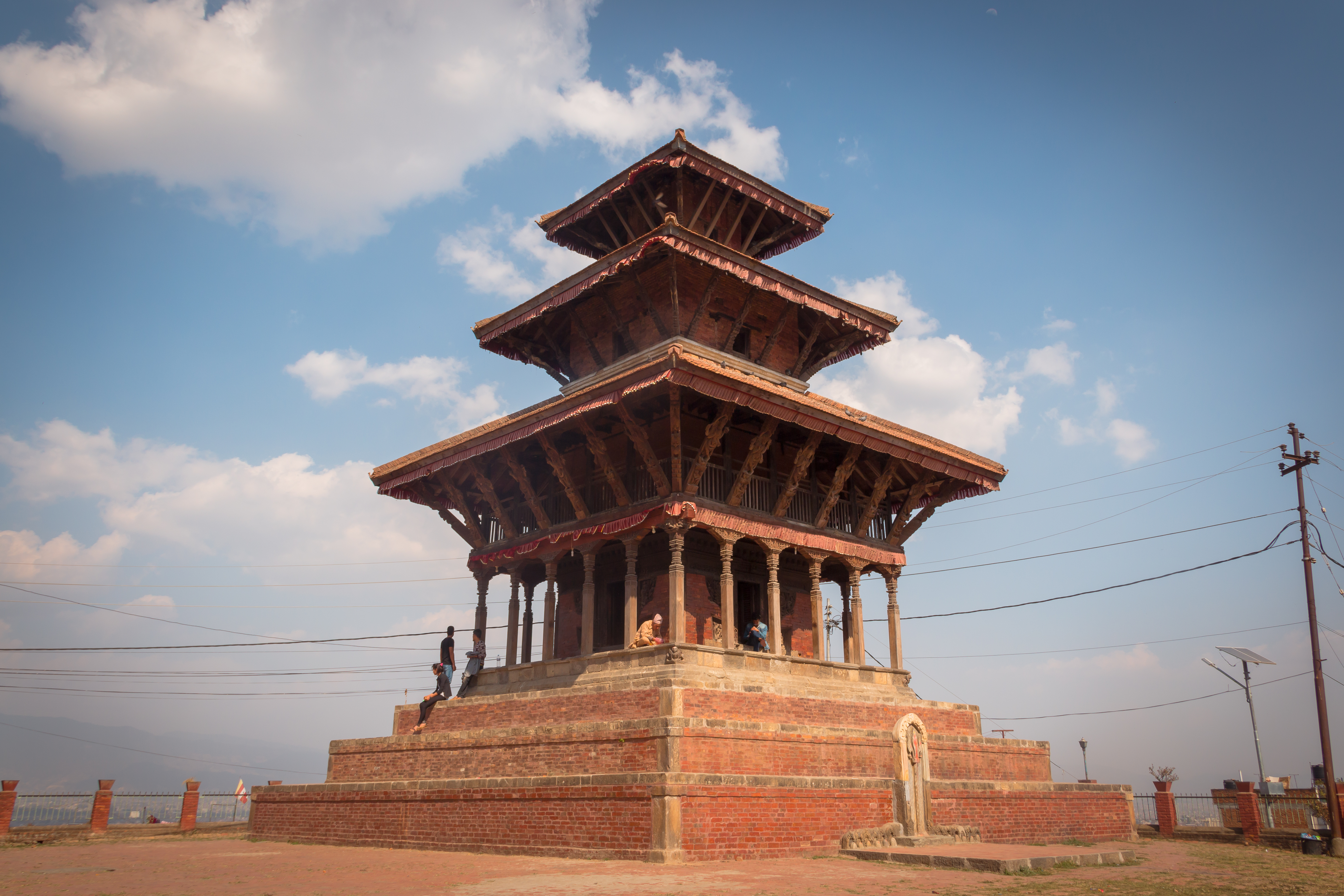
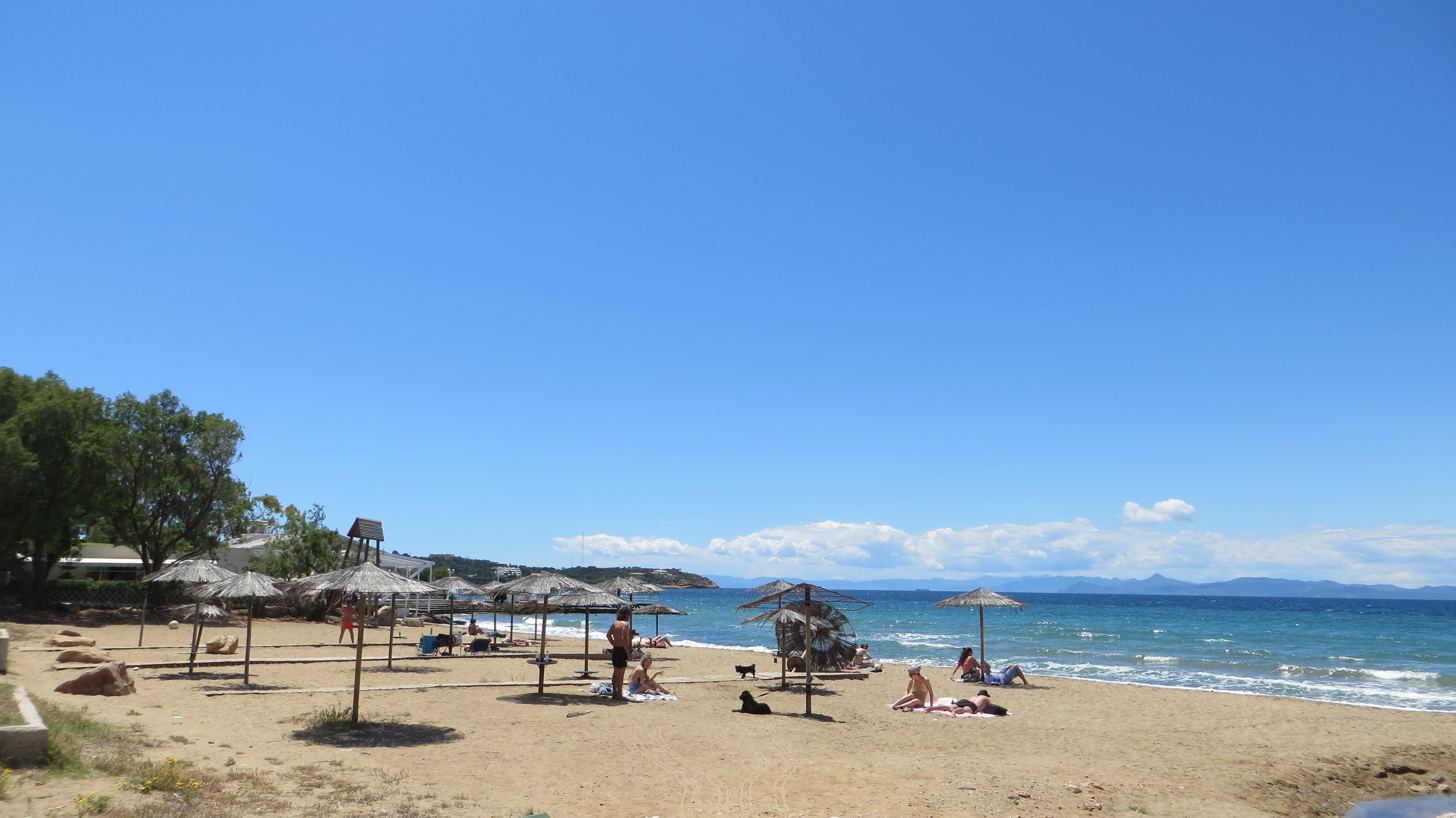
Teams left the temples of Kirtipur for the beaches of Vouliagmeni in the Athens Riviera.
- Episode 10: "The Surprise of All Time" / Kaikkien aikojen yllätys (31 January 2026)
- Prize: A €1,000 Tjäreborg gift card (awarded to Sara & Artturi)
- Eliminated: Armi & Sari

Locations

- Dakshinkali (Pharping – Asura Cave)
  - Dakshinkali (Pharping – Sukka Driving Institute Centre)
- Kirtipur (Dharma Store)
- Kirtipur (Newa: Lahana Restaurant)
- Kirtipur (Uma Maheshwar Temple)
- Kathmandu (Tribhuvan International Airport) → Athens, Greece (Athens International Airport)
- Glyfada (Ace Hotel & Swim Club Athens)
- Vouliagmeni (Kavouri Beach)
- Vouliagmeni (Saint Nikolaos of Vouliagmeni Chapel)

Episode summary

- At the start of this leg, teams were instructed to travel to Dharma Store in Kirtipur. Teams then had to travel by foot to Newa: Lahana Restaurant, where they had to prepare 15 Newar steamed dumplings called yomari and eat two to receive their next clue.
  - Sara & Artturi used their Express Pass to bypass this task.
- For their Speed Bump, Maria & Vilma had to travel to a driving school and drive a car through a course before they could continue racing.
- After travelling to Uma Maheshwar Temple, teams had to arrange nine Buddhist symbols by solving a series of riddles. The completed answer gave teams a combination to unlock a box with their next clue, which instructed them to travel to Athens, Greece.
- Once in Greece, teams were released from the Ace Hotel & Swim Club Athens in the order that they arrived at Tribhuvan International Airport and had to travel to Kavouri Beach to find their next clue.
- In this leg's Roadblock, one team member had to swim into the Saronic Gulf, retrieve a ring of keys and unlock a pithos representing Pandora's box to find their next clue, which directed them to the Pit Stop: the Saint Nikolaos of Vouliagmeni chapel.

Additional note

- Armi & Sari received a five-minute penalty after Sari helped Armi during the Roadblock leading to their elimination.

=== Leg 11 (Greece) ===
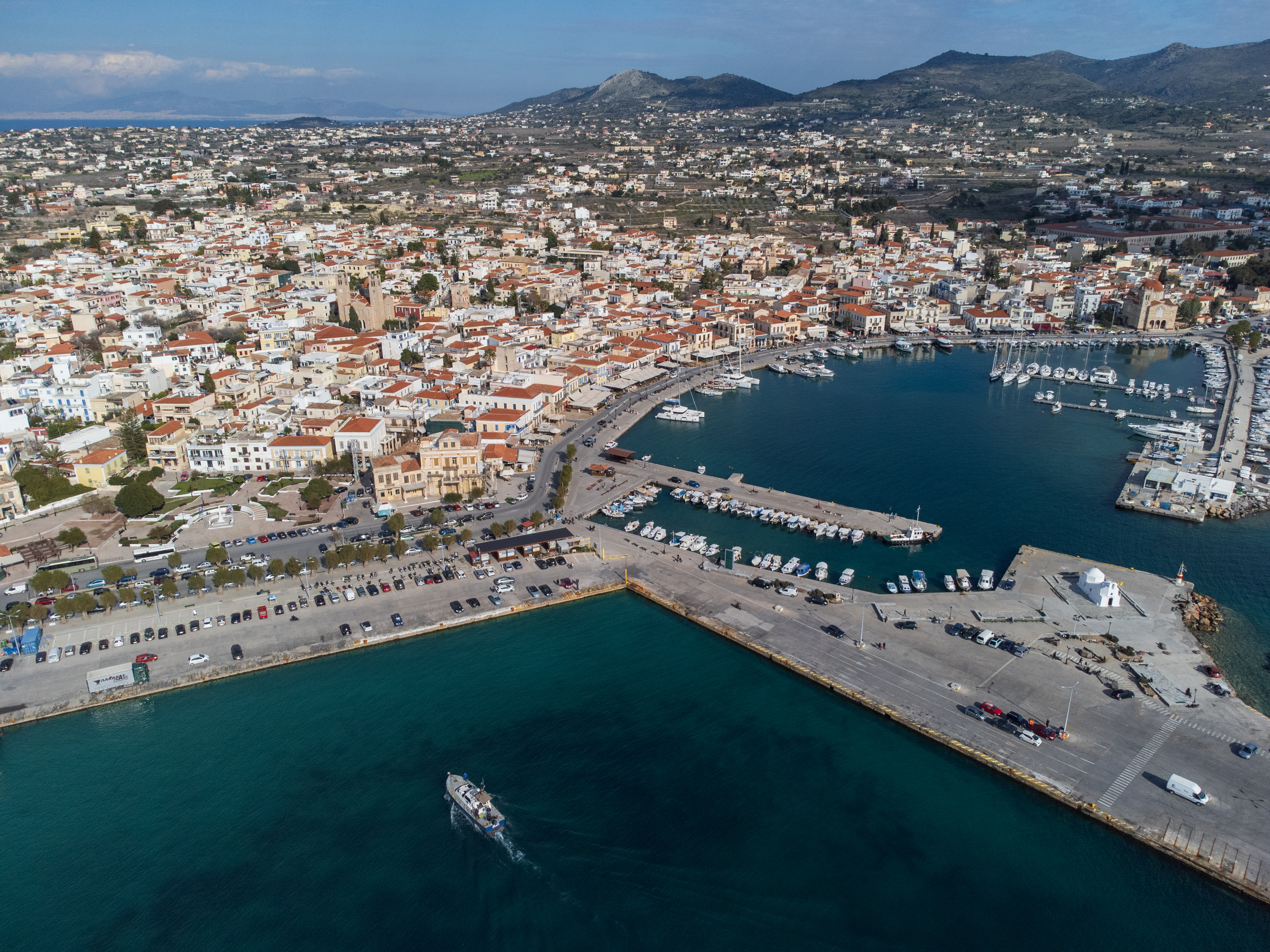
The island of Aegina within the Saronic Islands hosted the season's penultimate leg.

- Episode 11: "Whose Memory is Failing?" / Kenen muisti pettää? (7 February 2026)
- Prize: A Finnlines gift card (awarded to Maria & Vilma)
- Eliminated: Sara & Artturi

Locations

- Vouliagmeni (Saint Nikolaos of Vouliagmeni Chapel)
- Piraeus (Port of Piraeus) → Aegina (Aegina Port)
- Aegina (Old Town Hall – Fruit Stand)
- Aegina (Perdika Beach)
- Aegina (Harris Family Pistachio Farm)
- Aegina (Pyrgos Ralli Estate)
- Aegina (Eleonas Ancient Olive Grove)

Episode summary

- At the start of this leg, teams were instructed to fold two Finnlines paper hats before travelling by ferry to the island of Aegina. Once there, teams had to travel to a fruit stand, where they bought four apples and their next clue. Teams then had to travel to Perdika Beach and unearth four ceramic plate shards to receive their next clue, which directed them to Harris Family Pistachio Farm on Agias Barbaras.
- This season's final Detour was a choice between Purity (Puhde) or Poking (Penkominen). In Purity, teams had to shell pistachios until they filled a container to a line to receive their next clue. In Poking, teams had to search through pistachios until they found ones with letters that they had to unscramble into a word – PISTAASI – to receive their next clue.
- After the Detour, teams had to travel to Pyrgos Ralli Estate, where they had to solve a puzzle by recalling essential facts of the season to receive their next clue, which directed them to the Pit Stop: the Eleonas Ancient Olive Grove. The correct answers were:

Correct answers
| Leg | Flag | Name | Symbol | Word |
|---|---|---|---|---|
| 1 | Cambodia | កម្ពុជា | Compass | Susadey |
| 2 | Cambodia | កម្ពុជា | Cricket | Tonle Sap |
| 3 | Thailand | ประเทศไทย | Bamboo | Phrom |
| 4 | Thailand | ประเทศไทย | Snake | Chok Dee |
| 5 | Sri Lanka | ශ්‍රී ලංකා | Raban Pole | Suba Gaman |
| 6 | Sri Lanka | ශ්‍රී ලංකා | Die | Kimbula binis |
| 7 | Sri Lanka | ශ්‍රී ලංකා | Lantern | Ceylon |
| 8 | Nepal | नेपाल | Candles | Tenzing Norgay |
| 9 | Nepal | नेपाल | Coins | Rigon Tashi |
| 10 | Nepal | नेपाल | Keys | Pheri betha |
| 10 | Greece | Ελλάδα | Keys | Pheri betha |

=== Leg 12 (Greece → Finland) ===
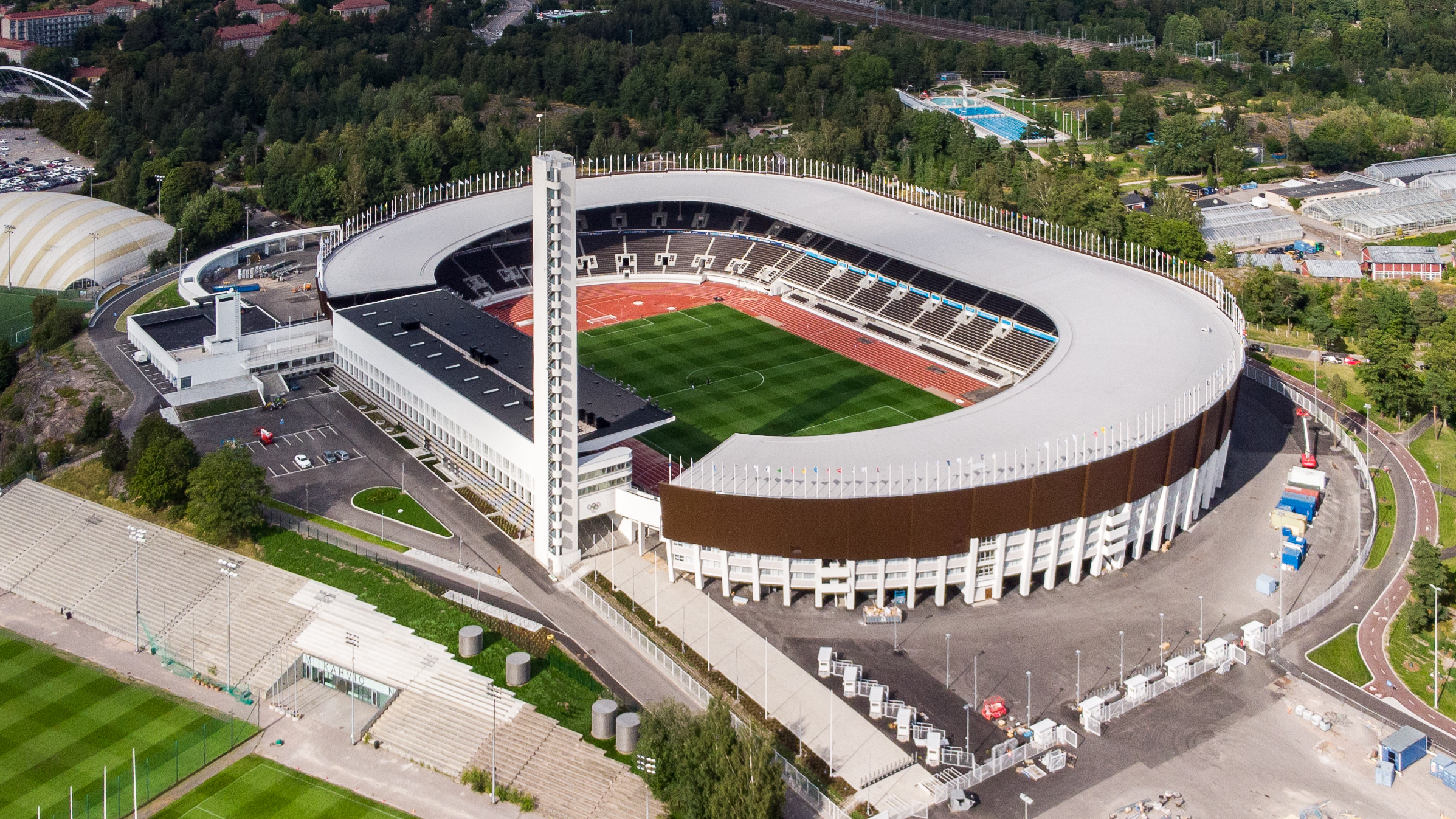
The third season of Amazing Race Suomi finished at the Helsinki Olympic Stadium, the centre of the 1952 Summer Olympics.

- Episode 12: "Towards the Finish Line" / Kohti maaliviivaa (14 February 2026)
- Prize: €30,000
- Winners: Maria & Vilma
- Runners-up: Millu & Karo
- Third place: Tomas & Esko

Locations

- Glyfada (Ace Hotel & Swim Club Athens)
- Athens (Evretro Antiques Shop)
- Athens (Panellinios Gymnastikos Syllogos)
- Athens (Ancient Agora of Athens)
- Athens (Dora Stratou Theatre)
- Corinth (Corinth Canal)
- Athens (Athens International Airport) → Helsinki, Finland (Helsinki–Vantaa Airport)
- Helsinki (Pitsku Tower (in Finnish))
- Helsinki (Talin Siirtolapuutarha (in Finnish))
- Helsinki (Helsinki Olympic Stadium)

Episode summary

- At the start of this leg, teams were instructed to travel to the Evretro Antiques Shop and purchase an Olympic torch to receive their next clue sending them to Panellinios Gymnastikos Syllogos. There, teams had to use a magnifying glass to light their torch and receive their next clue.
- Teams then had to travel to the Ancient Agora of Athens, find a philosopher and say "Socrates" to receive their next clue. From the agora, teams had to travel to the Dora Stratou Theatre and perform a Greek tragedy to receive their next clue, which sent them to the Corinth Canal.
- In this leg's first Roadblock, one team member had to bungee jump 70 metres (230 ft) into the Corinth Canal to receive their next clue.
- After the first Roadblock, teams were instructed to fly to Helsinki, Finland. After landing, teams found their next clue inside the terminal which directed them to find a marked car at the top of the P5 parking garage with their next clue.
- In this season's final Roadblock, one team member had to search for an Amazing Race flag in Talin Siirtolapuutarha from atop the Pitsku Tower. They had to rappel face-first 70 metres (230 ft) down the tower to reunite with their partner.
- After driving to the flag in Talin Siirtolapuutarha, teams had to use a compass to travel south to a puzzle station, where they had to construct a puzzle of the finish line: the Helsinki Olympic Stadium.

== Reception ==
=== Critical reception ===
Upon releasing the contestant roster for the season, the Finnish television consumers immediately picked up on their favourite teams, and least liked pairings. Some described the season's cast "boring" or "not interesting" compared to some of the best pairs of the previous two seasons, but many still find the show watchable.

The season has also raised once again critique by having two participants who have taken a side on the topic of climate change. Rapper and artist Paleface and politician Maria Guzenina have both critiqued "flying for fun" before, and this has risen heavy noise on the social platforms like Jodel, X and Facebook.

=== Television ratings ===
The following ratings are taken from Finnpanel.

| No. | Air date | Episode | Weekly rank | Overnight viewers | Seven day viewers | Ref |
|---|---|---|---|---|---|---|
| 1 | 15 November 2025 | The Adventure Begins! | 1 | 277,000 | 350,000 | |
| 2 | 22 November 2025 | Crickets Are Playing in the Forest | 4 | 230,000 | 268,000 | |
| 3 | 29 November 2025 | Concentration on Test | 1 | 279,000 | 325,000 | |
| 4 | 5 December 2025 | Challenging Details | 3 | 225,000 | 300,000 | |
| 5 | 13 December 2025 | Manure Work | 1 | 331,000 | 372,000 | |
| 6 | 20 December 2025 | A Lump in the Throat | 1 | 344,000 | 360,000 | |
| 7 | 10 January 2026 | The Race Heats Up | 1 | 290,000 | 325,000 | |
| 8 | 17 January 2026 | Mixing Placements | 1 | 347,000 | 391,000 | |
| 9 | 24 January 2026 | Lost in the Countryside | 2 | 286,000 | 350,000 | |
| 10 | 31 January 2026 | The Surprise of All Time | 3 | 326,000 | 375,000 | |
| 11 | 7 February 2026 | Whose Memory is Failing? | 3 | 309,000 | 352,000 | |
| 12 | 14 February 2026 | Towards the Finish Line | 2 | 424,000 | 489,000 | |

- Due to the finale of Petolliset, the premiere aired at 9:00 PM, with subsequent episodes airing at 7:30 PM.
- Due to Independence Day programming on 6 December, the fourth episode aired one day early.
