= Amazing Race Suomi =

Finnish adventure reality game television series

- Genre: Reality competition
- Created by: Elise Doganieri; Bertram van Munster
- Based on: The Amazing Race by: Bertram van Munster; Elise Doganieri
- Directed by: Jussi Korva; Olli Horttana
- Presented by: Heikki Paasonen
- Theme music composer: John M. Keane
- Country of origin: Finland
- Original language: Finnish
- No. of seasons: 4
- No. of episodes: 38

Production
- Executive producers: Jesse McDonald; Pauliina Koutala; Petra Martikainen
- Producers: Mia Lehmusoksa; Anna Väisänen; Ella Kaarna; Johanna Tarvainen
- Production location: see below
- Running time: 67–99 minutes
- Production companies: Moskito Television; ABC Signature

Original release
- Network: Nelonen; Ruutu+
- Release: 30 September 2023 – present

Related
- International versions

Amazing Race Suomi (English: The Amazing Race Finland) is a Finnish reality competition show based on the American series The Amazing Race. Hosted by Heikki Paasonen and following the premise of other versions in the Amazing Race franchise, the show follows teams of two as they race around the world. Each season is split into legs, with teams tasked to deduce clues, navigate themselves in foreign areas, interact with locals, perform physical and mental challenges, and travel by air, boat, car, taxi, and other modes of transport. Teams are progressively eliminated at the end of most legs for being the last to arrive at designated Pit Stops. The first team to arrive at the Finish Line wins the grand prize of EUR30,000.

The first season aired on Nelonen network on Saturdays at 19.30 pm local time and on the Ruutu+ streaming service starting on 30 September 2023. The first two episodes and the finale of the first season were two-hour long specials, and the remaining episodes 90 minutes. The season finale aired on 16 December 2023 simultaneously, at 19.30 pm on the streaming platform and TV channel. After the success of the first season, the show was renewed for a second season, hosted by Paasonen, and premiered in October 2024 on Nelonen.

The show was again renewed for a third season which started filming on 3 May 2025. In May 2025, the series was renewed for a fourth season set to premiere in November 2026.

== The Race ==
=== Route Markers ===
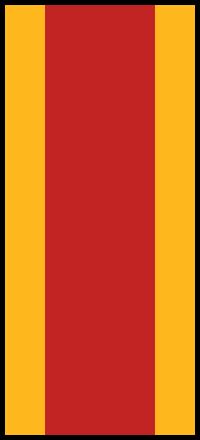

Route Markers are yellow and red flags that mark the places where teams must go. Most Route Markers are attached to the boxes that contain clue envelopes, but some may mark the place where the teams must go in order to complete tasks, or may be used to line a course that the teams must follow.

=== Clues ===
Clues are found throughout the legs in sealed envelopes, normally inside clue boxes. They give teams the information they need and tasks they need to do in order for them to progress through the legs.

- Route Info (Reitti–Info): A general clue that may include a task to be completed by the team before they can receive their next clue.
- Detour (Kiertotie): A choice of two tasks. Teams are free to choose either task or swap tasks if they find one option too difficult.
- Roadblock (Tiesulku): A task only one team member can complete. Teams must choose which member will complete the task based on a brief clue about the task before fully revealing the details of the task.
- Fast Forward (Ohituskaista): A special task during a leg, the winner of which gets to skip all the rest tasks of that leg, and head directly to the Pit Stop. Introduced on the fourth season.

=== Legs ===
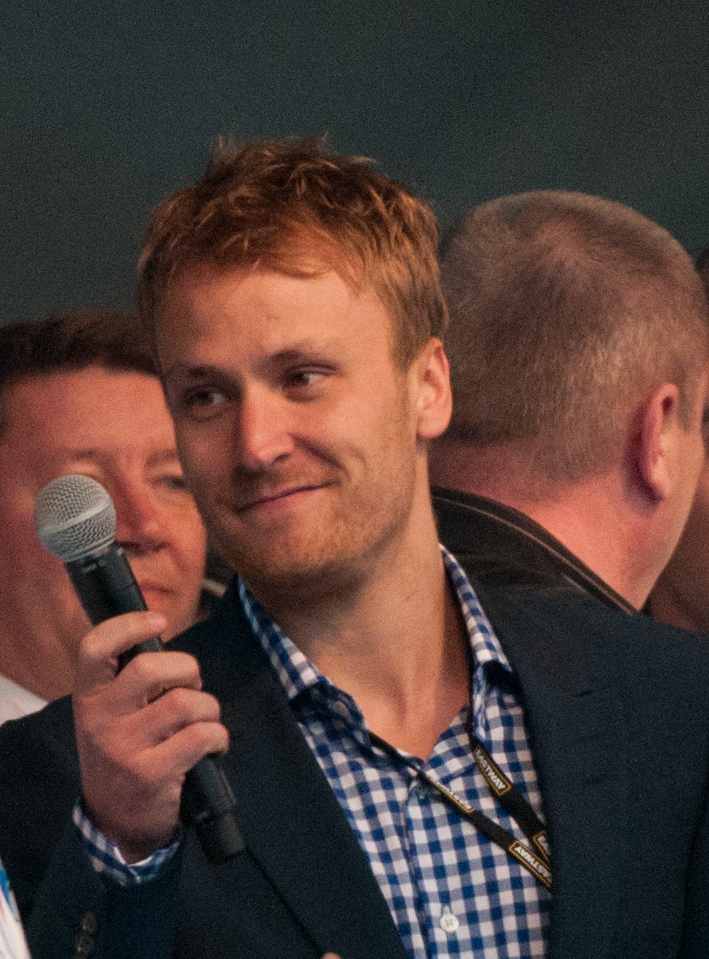
Host Heikki Paasonen.

==== Gameplay prizes ====
- Express Pass (Express–Passi): Introduced in the second season, the Express Pass is awarded to the winning team of a specific leg and allows them to skip one task of their choosing in a future leg.
  - For the second season, the winners of the first leg earned them the single Express Pass of the season.
  - For the third season, there was two Express Passes included, which the winning teams have to use in one task of choice during one of the three following legs.
  - For the fourth season, once again only one Express Pass is being played, this time on a random leg during the season.

==== Non-elimination legs ====
The teams may be punished for arriving last to the Pit Stop on a non-elimination leg. This could affect their placements next leg.

- Speed Bump (Hidaste): The team that finishes last in a non-elimination leg may have to perform a penalty task at some point during the next leg. This task must be completed before the team is allowed to continue racing.
  - In the first season, there was only two instances out of three, when a team had to perform a Speed Bump after placing last on a non-elimination leg. The other time there wasn't any penalty for the last placed non-eliminated.
  - From the second season onwards, the Speed Bump has been a common part of non-elimination leg punishments.

==== Super-legs ====
During the Race the contestants may encounter so-called "Super-legs" (Super-etappi). Upon arriving at the pit stop of a designated location, the presenter Heikki may announce that the leg isn't over, and hands the next clue to the contestants. The racers must complete the second part of the leg without any rest period at the pit stop area. These super-legs are ofter split into two episodes.

=== Rules and penalties ===
==== Rules ====
- During the whole Race, both of each team's members must've performed the same amount of Roadblock tasks. However, it isn't ruled that the racers have to perform the tasks alternately.
- Teams have to complete all of the tasks during the legs, otherwise they must return to complete any undone tasks, before checking in at the pit stop. This however doesn't apply when an Express Pass is being used.

==== Penalties ====
- If a team fails to perform a Roadblock, Detour or Speed Bump they receive a 2-hour penalty.

== Series overview ==
No.	Race Information								Winners	Host	Additional Notes
No.	Start Date	Starting Line	Finish Date	Finish Line	Distance	Countries	Legs	Teams	Winners	Host	Additional Notes
1	24 July 2023	Töölönlahti Park, Helsinki	16 August 2023	Helsinki Velodrome, Helsinki	26,000 km (16,000 mi)	7	12	12	Kaisa Mäkäräinen & Mari Eder	Heikki Paasonen	Celebrity Version, where at least one contestant from each pair is publicly known
2	22 May 2024	Heureka Science Center, Vantaa	14 June 2024	Helsinki Velodrome, Helsinki	20,000 km (12,000 mi)	6	12	11	Metti Forssell & Hanna Launonen	Heikki Paasonen	Introduced the Express Pass. First season to visit Europe and the Americas
3	3 May 2025	Suvilahti Cultural Center, Helsinki	28 May 2025	Olympic Stadium, Helsinki	27,000 km (17,000 mi)	6	12	11	Maria Guzenina & Vilma Vähämaa	Heikki Paasonen	Total of two Express Passes were on stake during this season
4	23 May 2026	Tähtitorninvuori, Helsinki	15 June 2026			6	12	11		Heikki Paasonen	Introduced the Fast Forward. First season to visit Africa

- As of season 3, only females-only teams have won the program. This is a record that the finnish version of the franchise currently holds.

== Broadcast details and ratings ==
Ratings are provided by Finnpanel.

No.	Network	Episodes	Timeslot (EET)	Premiere			Finale			Average Viewers	Average Rank	Ref
No.	Network	Episodes	Timeslot (EET)	Date	Viewers	Rank	Date	Viewers	Rank	Average Viewers	Average Rank	Ref
1	Nelonen	12	Saturday 7:30 p.m.	30 September 2023	375,000	#1	16 December 2023 (Note: Aired simultaneously on the tv channel and streaming platform.)	580,000	#1	429,000	#2	
2	Nelonen	12	Saturday 7:30 p.m.	5 October 2024	407,000	#2	21 December 2024	492,000	#1	328,000	#2	
3	Nelonen	12	Saturday 9:00 p.m. (Note: First episode aired much later due to the finale of Petolliset on the same channel.); Saturday 7:30 p.m.	15 November 2025	277,000	#1	14 February 2026	424,000	#2	306,000	#2	
4	Nelonen	12	Saturday 7:30 p.m.	14 November 2026			13 February 2027					

== Countries visited ==
Here is the list of countries Amazing Race Suomi has visited so far:

=== Europe ===
Rank	Country	Season(s) visited	Pit Stops
1	Finland	All (1–4)	3 (Note: Includes 3 Finish Lines)
2	Greece	1 (3)	2
2	Poland	1 (2)	2
2	Romania	1 (2)	2
2	Slovenia	1 (4)	2

=== North America ===
Rank	Country	Season(s) visited	Pit Stops
1	Costa Rica	1 (2)	1
1	Panama	1 (2)	3

=== South America ===
Rank	Country	Season(s) visited	Pit Stops
1	Colombia	1 (2)	3

=== Asia ===
Rank	Country	Season(s) visited	Pit Stops
1	Thailand	2 (1, 3)	4
2	Cambodia	1 (3)	2
2	Indonesia	1 (1)	3
2	Malaysia	1 (1)	2
2	Nepal	1 (3)	2
2	Philippines	1 (1)	2
2	Singapore	1 (1)	0
2	Sri Lanka	1 (3)	3
2	Vietnam	1 (1)	2

== Reception ==
=== Critical reception ===
==== Climate change criticism ====
When first announced, the program drew criticism for including Left Alliance politicians (Nurminen, Pekonen and Modig), who have advocated for reductions in greenhouse gas emissions, on a show that includes air travel. Filming of the show also began after the 2023 Greece wildfires on Rhodes, leading to more vocal criticism. Prior to the start of filming, producer Pauliina Koutala from Moskito Television stated that the show was made with climate change in mind and that they would be offsetting emissions used for filming, which included having teams fly on airlines that use sustainable aviation fuel and rainforest reclamation at the Rimba Raya Biodiversity Reserve on Borneo. In addition, the production team planned a route in such a way to minimise air travel with alternative forms of transportation on land. In total, all the contestants who reached the final leg travelled about 26,000 kilometres (16,000 mi) by airplanes, roughly corresponding to approximately two round trip flights from Helsinki to New York City. On 14 September 2023, Nurminen, Pekonen and Modig stated at a press event that they understood the criticism and agreed to compete after learning about the flight compensations.

==== Positive feedback ====
Despite the negative social feedback, many Finnish television consumers were positive towards the first season's contestants with many praising the new and varied faces that have not been on reality television programs before. The fast-paced action and comedic elements of the show were praised, and the Finnish version was very similar and relatable to its original American counterpart. Even though the first season took place almost entirely in Southeast Asia and did not feature "flight drama", viewers were overall positive about how this huge format was made successfully in Finland and expressed interest for another season.

Since its first season, the program has also visited European and South American countries. In November of 2026, the program's already fourth season starts to air on Nelonen in saturday's prime time slot, hosted by Heikki Paasonen.

==== Ratings ====
According to Nelonen, the first season got a very respectful reception, with the program reach of the whole season reached the total of 2.9 million viewers from 4+ age group, if included all the streaming services and platforms. The average viewership for the season reached 429,000, with season finale picking up the highest average figures of the season for a single episode: 580,000. Prior to the season finale, the season was nominated for Golden Venla Awards in the category of "Competition Reality" and "Best Director(s)" (Jussi Korva & Olli Horttana), that latter which won the award.

The program's official Instagram account - which covers best bits, behind-the-scenes and exclusive footage of the show - has gathered nearly 13,800 followers to date.

=== Awards and nominations ===
Summary of awards and nominations
Year	Award	Category	Nominated	Result	Ref.
2023	Golden Venla	Competition Reality	Season 1	Nominated	
2023	Golden Venla	Director (Entertainment, Reality and Events)	Jussi Korva & Olli Horttana	Won	
2024	Golden Venla	Competition Reality	Season 2	Nominated	
2024	Golden Venla	Script (Entertainment and Factual)	Sarri Schonert	Nominated	
2024	Golden Venla	Director (Entertainment and Factual)	Jussi Korva & Olli Horttana	Nominated	
2025	Golden Venla	Competition Reality	Season 3	Nominated	
2025	Golden Venla	Director (Entertainment and Factual)	Jussi Korva & Olli Horttana	Nominated	
