= Sara Sieppi =

Finnish media personality

- Born: 3 June 1991 (age 34); Tornio, Finland
- Occupations: Television host; social media personality; pageant
- Years active: 2011–present

Sara Josefina Sieppi (born 3 June 1991) is a Finnish television host, social media personality and Miss Finland 2011.

Sara Sieppi, originally from Tornio, Lapland, was the first runner-up in Miss Finland pageant in 2011, but became Miss Finland after Pia Lamberg decided to give up her title. Since then, Sieppi has received a lot of media attention and gained a considerable social media following. Her relationship with TV personality Roope Salminen, which lasted from 2015 till 2018, was widely followed in the Finnish media.

Sieppi has hosted multiple TV shows for Finnish commercial channel Nelonen: Paratiisihotelli Suomi in 2015 and 2017, Ummikot ulkomailla in 2016 and Kiss Bang Love Suomi in 2016. She has also frequently appeared in the Finnish version of Wheel of Fortune on TV5. Sieppi has also been a participant in reality shows, such as Celebrity Big Brother Finland 2013 the Finnish version of the Survivor franchise, Selviytyjät Suomi, and Amazing Race Suomi season 3.

Sieppi is currently in a relationship with Finnish national team footballer Pyry Soiri.
