= Heikki Paasonen (presenter) =

Finnish television presenter (born 1983)

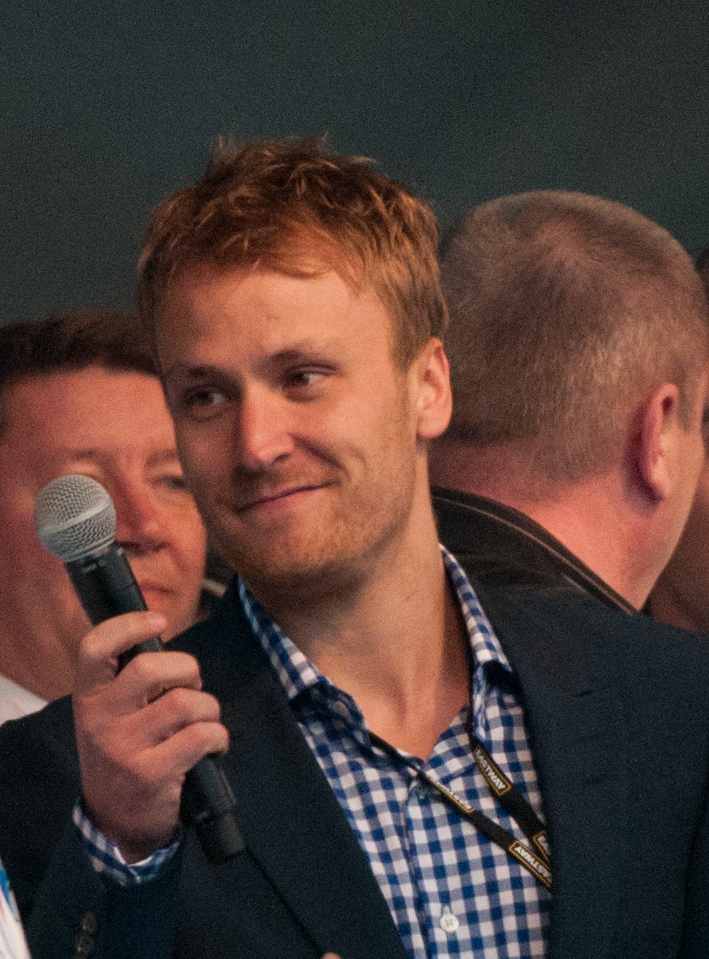
Heikki Paasonen at 2011 IIHF World Championship gold medal celebrations in Helsinki

Heikki Valtteri Paasonen (born 23 February 1983) is a Finnish television presenter.

Paasonen is one of Finland's most famous and decorated presenters. His career began at very early ages from Yleisradios youth programs.

Paasonen first came to prominence as the host of Idols with Ellen Jokikunnas. He was also a presenter on the music channel The Voice TV in 2007. He was also Yle's commentator for the Eurovision Song Contest 2007.

Paasonen's very own television program, Heikki Paasonen Show aired during 2017, thus ending only after one season. In 2021, he presented Nelonen's Mysteerilaulajat, the Finnish version of I Can See Your Voice, and starting in 2023, Paasonen is the host of Finland's version of The Amazing Race.
