= Raban (drum) =

Traditional drum from Sri Lanka

Raban or Rabana (Sinhala: රබාන) is a one-sided traditional drum type played with the hands, used in Sri Lanka. It's mainly played in Aurudu Kreeda (The Sri Lankan New Year). The body of these drums is made by carving the Jack or Vitex trees. The skin used is that of a goat. There are two types of Rabans as Hand Raban and Bench Raban.

- Hand Raban is about one foot in diameter. Some performers keep revolving the Raban on the tip of their fingers while others play it accompanied with singing. This is played with one hand only. This type of Rabana is mostly associated with the type of folk songs called 'Virindu'. The 'Virindu' singer carrying a 'Hand Rabana' clad with a sarong and a bandana is iconic in pre-modern Sri Lankan society.
- Bench Raban is the biggest of the drums used in Sri Lanka with the diameter of it about four feet. The special feature of this drum is that it is played by two or more people at a time. They use both hands. During the festival season, people gather around the Raban and play it for various rhythms. These rhythms are called Raban Sural and they're mostly played by women. It's played on every happy occasion. They also sing songs along the rhythm called varang kavi or raban pada. Sri Lankan folk literature is full of varang kavi and raban pada.

== See also ==
- Culture of Sri Lanka
- Kandyan dance
