= Bellanwila Rajamaha Viharaya =

Buddhist temple in Bellanwila, Colombo District, Sri Lanka

- බෙල්ලන්විල රජ මහා විහාරය
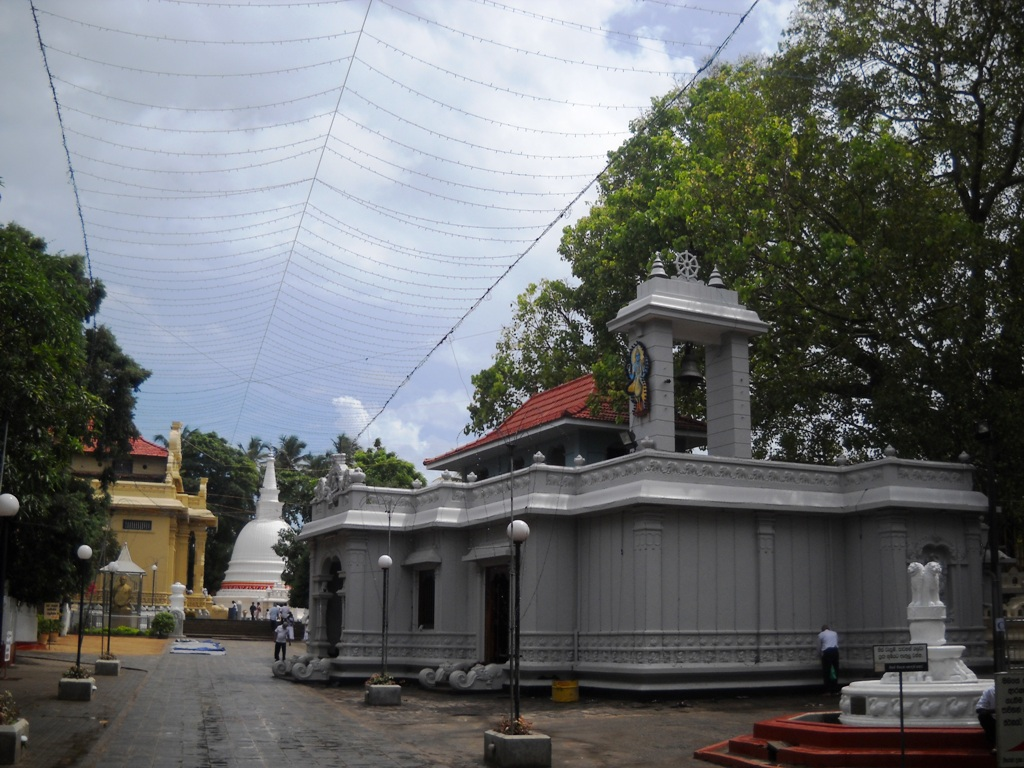
- Bellanwila Rajamaha Viharaya

Religion
- Affiliation: Buddhism
- Leadership: Ven. Dr. Bellanwila Dhammaratana Nayaka Thera (Chief incumbent)

Location
- Country: Sri Lanka
- Interactive map of Bellanwila Rajamaha Viharaya
- Coordinates: 6°50′44″N 79°53′24″E

Architecture
- Founder: Thengodagedara Thera; Bellanwila Somaratana Thera
- Completed: Rediscovered in 1850 {According to the ancient texts, the bodhi tree (sacred fig) dates back to Anuradhapura period.}

Website
- http://www.bellanwila.org/en/

Bellanwila Rajamaha Viharaya (Sinhala: බෙල්ලන්විල රජ මහා විහාරය) is a Buddhist temple situated in Bellanwila, Colombo District, Sri Lanka. Located around 12 km south to the Colombo city, near Dehiwala - Maharagama road, the temple attracts hundreds of devotees daily and is famous for its annual Esala Perehera festival which usually takes place in the month of August or September. One of the most venerated Buddhist temples in Sri Lanka, many devotees flock to worship the sacred Bo tree of Bellanwila Rajamaha Vihara, which is considered to be one of the first offshoots of Jaya Sri Maha Bodhi in Anuradhapura, Sri Lanka. The present chief incumbent of Bellanwila Rajamaha Vihara is Ven. Dr. Bellanwila Dhammaratana Nayaka Thera.

== History and revival ==
There is literary evidence in ancient texts such as the Sinhala Bodhivamsaya which records that the Bodhi-tree in Bellanwila as one of the thirty-two saplings that sprang from the sacred Jaya Sri Maha Bodhi at Anuradhapura planted in the 3rd century BC. Bellanwila is also mentioned in the literary works of the 15th century, when Kotte, which is located close to Bellanwila, became the capital of the country. In the Kotte period Buddhism rose to great heights with the royal patronage of King Parakramabahu VI (1412–1467), who was the last native sovereign to unify all of Sri Lanka under one rule before the European colonial invasions.

The story of the revival of Bellanwila Viharaya is closely linked with Attidiya, a village adjoining Bellanwila. This sacred place was abandoned after the Portuguese invasion of the country's coastal areas. It was rediscovered by an adventurous monk known as Thengodagedara Hamuduruwo, who is said to be the founder of Galauda Viharaya. One day in 1850, when he was traveling by boat along the Katu-ela stream towards Pepiliyana, it is said that he heard the sound of drums from a nearby thicket. Being inquisitive, he left the boat and walked towards the sounds. As he approached, the drum sounds faded away and he was surprised to see a Bodhi-tree. Subsequently, he came to discover that this was one of the thirty-two saplings from the sacred Bodhi-tree at Anuradhapura. With the help of villagers, Thengodagedara thera cleared the land around the tree and built a modest shelter for monks. With this modest and mysterious beginning, Bellanwila began to attract the attention of Buddhist devotees in the neighbourhood.

Since Thengodagedara thera rediscovered Bellanwila, the temple has had a succession of chief monks such as Udugampola Sri Ratanapala thera, Udugampola Sri Dammakkhandha thera, Abhidhammika Weboda Sri Sangharatana thera, Asgiriye Devarakkhita thera and Bellanwila Sri Somaratana thera. It is Ven. Bellanwila Sri Somaratana thera, who became the chief incumbent of the temple in 1947 must be given the credit for raising Bellanwila Rajamaha Vihara to its present status. He began the task of developing the temple and he himself designed the structural concept of the temple complex taking the image house of Polonnaruwa as the model. After the demise of Bellanwila Sri Somaratana thera, his pupil prof. Bellanwila Wimalaratne Thera has continued the development work of the temple.

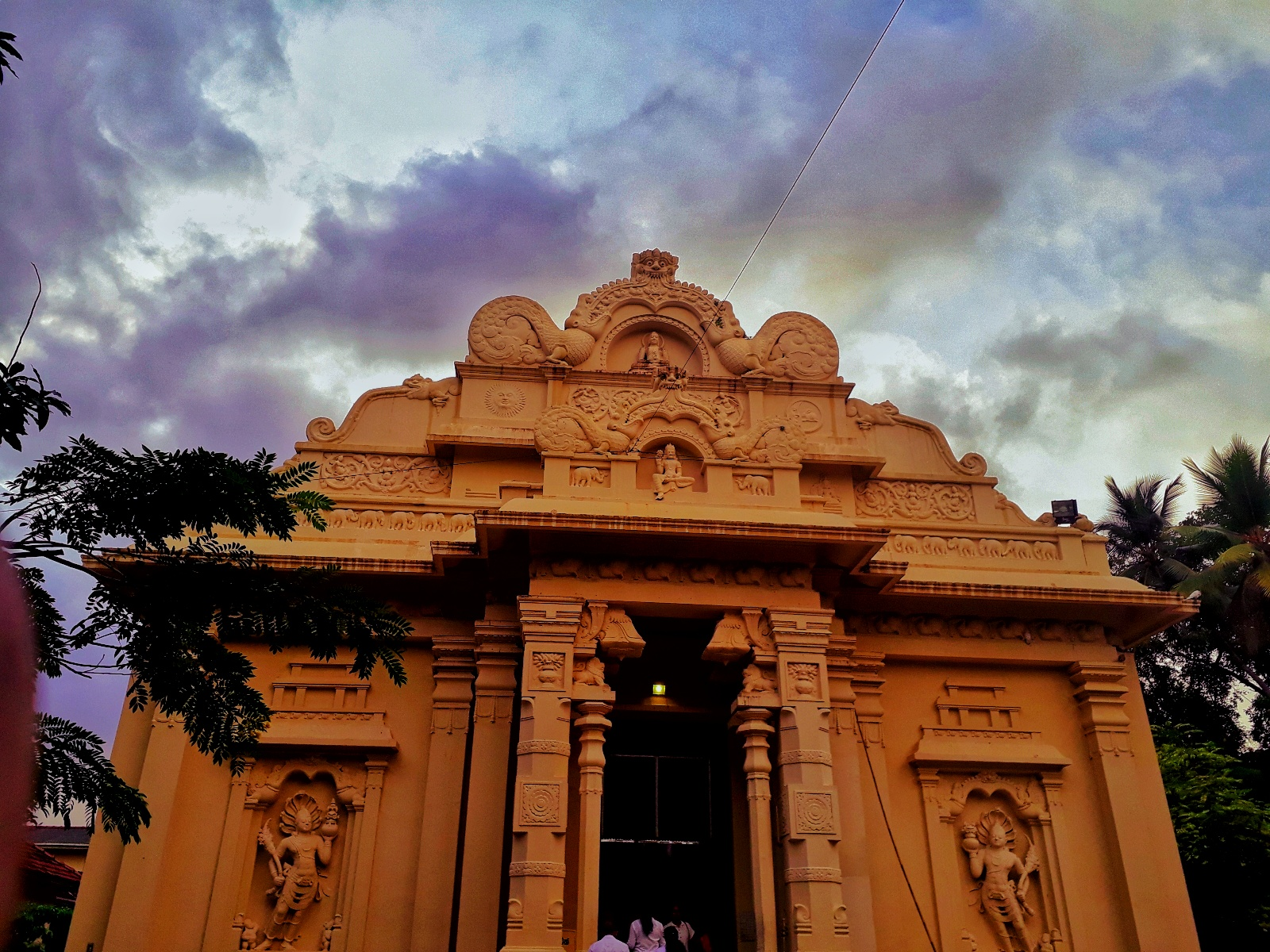
Main entrance of shrine hall

A recent addition to the temple is a set of murals, that adorn the inner walls of the shrine hall (Budu-Ge). These murals which were painted by artist Somabandu Vidyapathy, depict in different strokes the life of the Buddha and Buddhism. In addition to the main shrine hall there are shrines dedicated to popular deities of Sri Lanka such as Vishnu, Katharagama, Saman, Vibheeshana, Suniam, Dedimunda, Natha and Pattini Matha, housing their symbolic images. These shrines which are situated right round the Bodhi tree, also depict the architecture of Polonnaruwa period.

== The Sacred Bo Tree ==
The Bellanwila temple is known mostly for the sacred "Bellanwila Bo Tree" which is 2300 years old. The Bo tree is considered as one of the first Thirty-two saplings (Young trees) which arose spontaneously from Jaya Sri Maha Bodiya- Anuradhapura on the seventh day of its plantation ceremony. The King Dewanampiyathissa who has planted the "Jaya Sri Maha Bodhi" has invited prominent ruling heads from each respective area of the country and handed over these thirty-two saplings to be planted in their ruling areas. Sri Maha Bodiya was planted in 288 BC which is 2300 years back. The thirty-two saplings including "Bellanwila Bo Tree" are only seven days younger to Sri Maha Bodhiya. From these thirty-two saplings only four to five Bo Trees Including "Bellanwila" are survived or recognizable today.

== Esala festival ==
The Bellanwila Esala perehera (procession) that was started in 1947 under the instructions of Bellanwila Somaratana Nayaka Thera has grown into a pageant, which attracts large crowds annually. It is one of the annual cultural pageants in Sri Lanka. The Esala festival of Bellanwila, which is usually held throughout a week in the month of August or September in every year, draws many devotees from the district of Colombo and from other parts of the country. The attraction is for the features of the procession itself, and for the religious activities that lead up to the main event. Bellanwila esala festival includes Dhamma Desana sessions (religious sermons) which draws many devotees to the temple. Invoking of blessings starts with a week long Pirith chanting, which is followed by the processions that parade in the neighborhood of Bellanwila during the nights of Esala festival.

The Bellanewila Esala festival consist of a series of processions, namely Deva-dootha Perahera, Kumbal Perahera, Mal Perahera, Paawaada Perahera, Ransivili Perahera and Randoli Perahera. The Diya Kapeema Perahera and Deva Daanaya which concludes the esala festival, follows the Randoli Perahera which is held in the final night of the festival. The Bellanwila Esala procession usually consists of drummers, dancers (low-country and up-country), decorated tuskers and trumpeters who parades the neighbourhoods of the Bellanwila temple premises. Lantern bearers, together with devotees who carry Buddhist flags also take part in this grand display of religious piety, which portrays the Buddhist cultural and artistic heritage of Sri Lanka.
