= Suvilahti =

Cultural center in Helsinki, Finland

Coordinates: 60.1864°N 24.9745°E

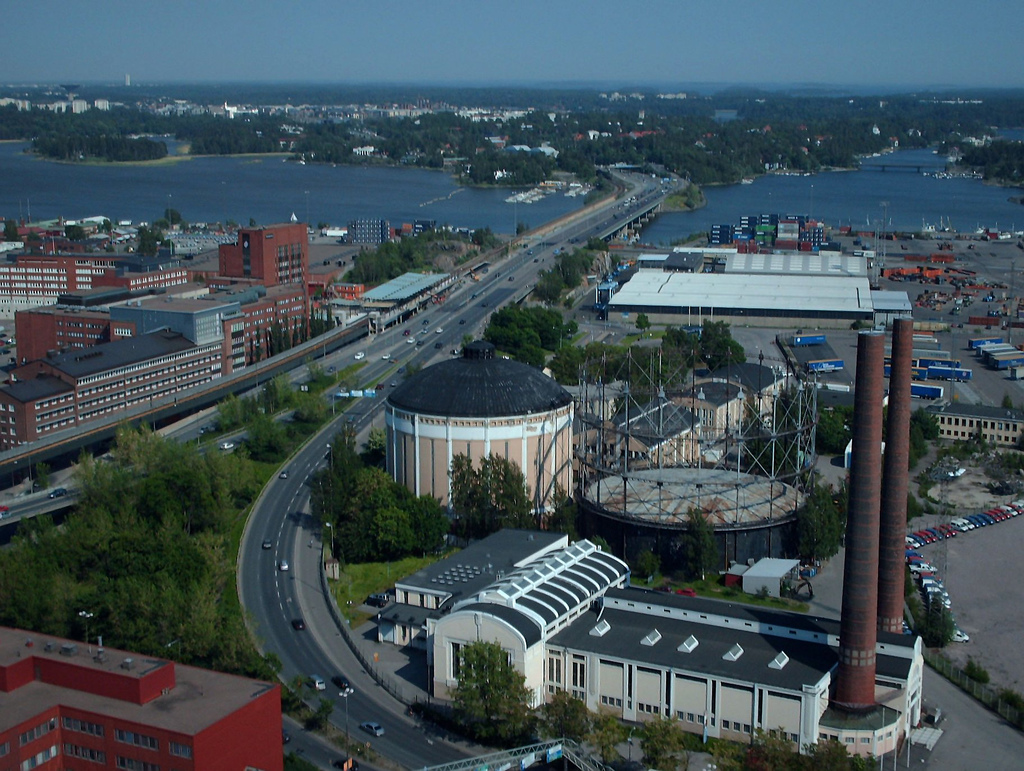
Suvilahti from the air in 2006 with Sörnäinen Harbour in the background.

Suvilahti (Swedish: Södervik) is a cultural center and former energy production area in Sörnäinen, Helsinki. It encompasses nine buildings and two large gasometers.

Construction of a steam turbine electrical power plant was completed in 1909 and a gas plant in 1910. The buildings were constructed using the then revolutionary steel-reinforced concrete method. The architect Selim A. Lindqvist was influenced by Viennese Jugendstil architecture.

The power plant was closed in 1976 and gas production ended in 1994.

Beginning in January 2008, the real estate company Kiinteistö Oy Kaapelitalo began developing, renting and maintaining the facilities. The facilities are being renovated for use by artists and other cultural activities. Suvilahti is home to photography studios, artists, writers, production companies and advertising agencies. The large courtyard is used for outdoor events.

In 2022, it was announced that the European Institute of Innovation and Technology (EIT), an agency of the European Union, will launch a new location at Suvilahti, beginning in 2023.

Kiinteistö Oy Kaapelitalo is owned by the City of Helsinki. The company is also responsible for the facilities at Kaapelitehdas in Ruoholahti, Helsinki.
