= Pharping =

Coordinates: 27°36′N 85°16′E

- Town
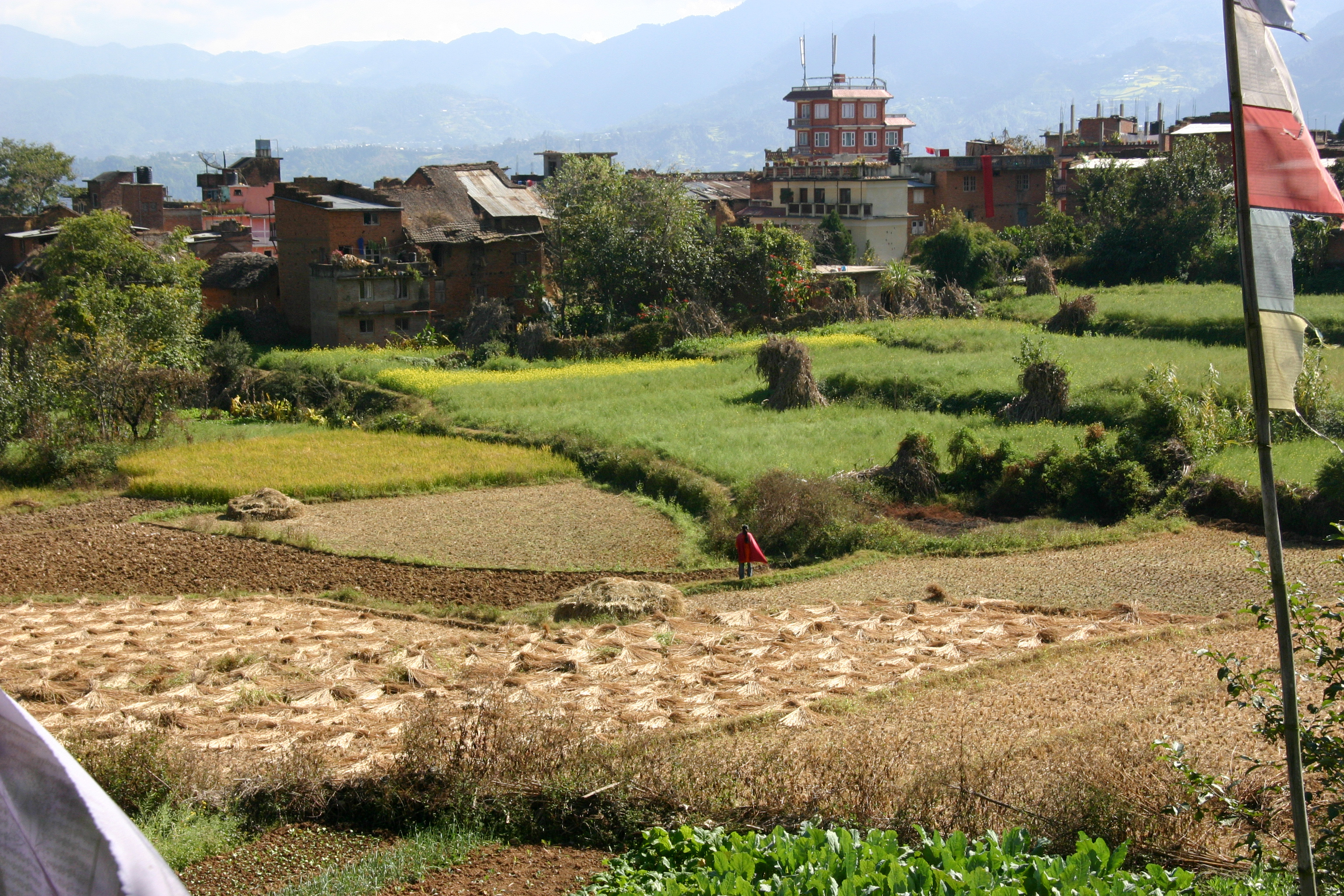
- Interactive map of Pharping

Pharping (or Phamting) is a small Newar town lying above the Bagmati river on the southern edge of the Kathmandu valley, about 23 km from the capital. It is now part of the Dakshinkali Municipality.

The town and its environs is the site of several important Buddhist pilgrimage sites as well as a number of Buddhist monasteries and meditation retreat centres.

About 1 km south of the town is the Dakshinkali Temple, one of the main Hindu temples of Nepal dedicated to the mother goddess Kali.

Pharping is also the site of the oldest hydroelectric power station in Nepal which is now a living museum.

== Buddhist pilgrimage places ==
=== Phamting Vajrayogini temple ===
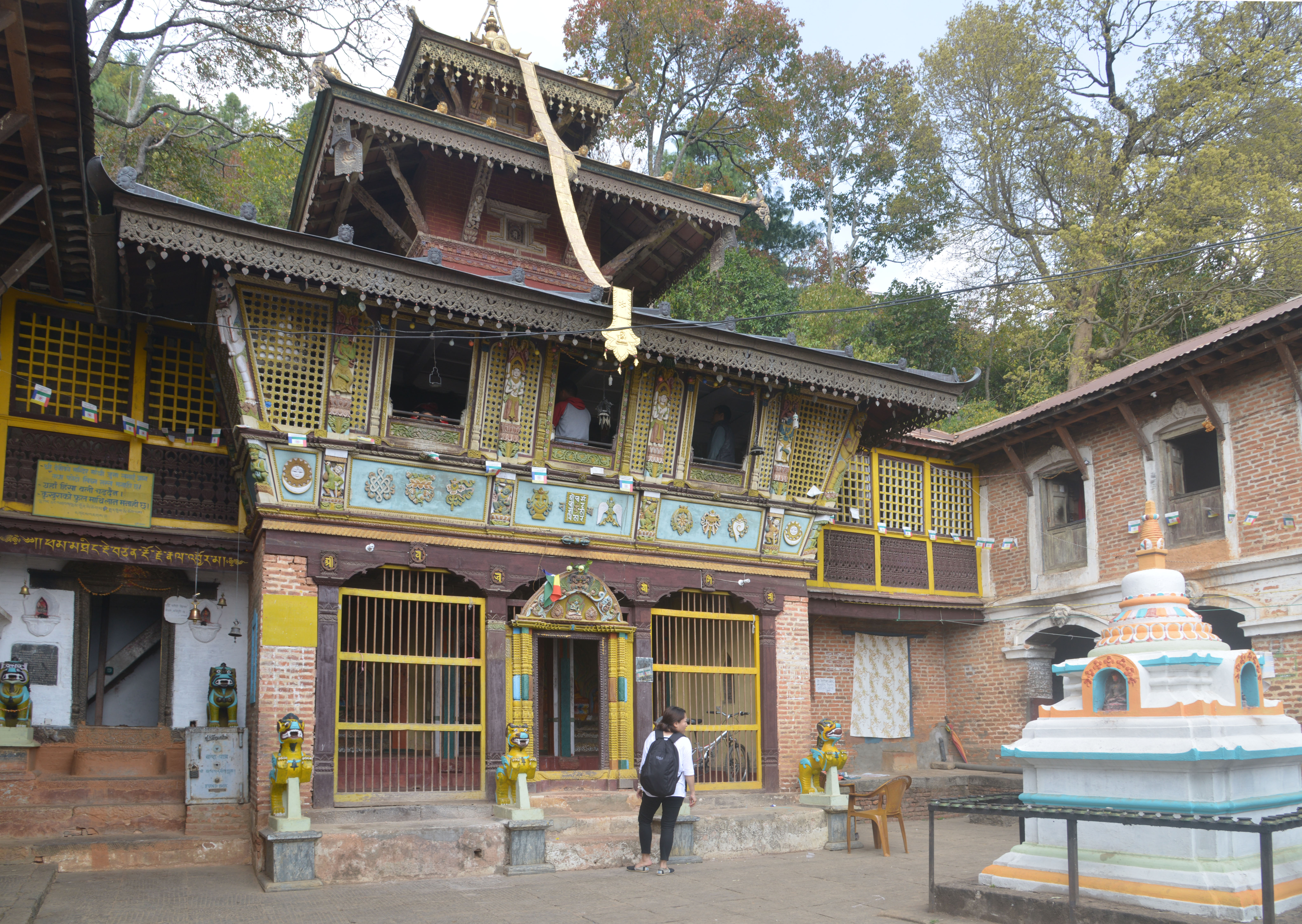
Phamting Vajrayogini temple

This temple, dedicated to Vajrayogini, is located on the side of the hill between the Yanglesho caves and the town of Pharping. It is one of the main Newar Buddhist Vajrayogini temples of the Nepal mandala which include the Sankhu Vajrayogini, Vidhyeshvari Vajrayogini, Phamting Vajrayogini, Guhyeshwari and the Pulchowk Khagayogini temples.

It is said to have been established by the Pamtingpa brothers, two important disciples of the Buddhist mahasiddhas Naropa and Maitripada. The present structure probably dates to the 17th century and has been renovated.

=== Yanglesho cave ===
Yangleshö cave (Tib. ཡང་ལེ་ཤོད་ཀྱི་བྲག་ཕུག, Wyl. yang le shod kyi brag phug) is located about ten minutes walk before the town of Pharping. Near the road, there are several large ponds and shrines dedicated to Vishnu in the form of Shesha Narayan which are located just below the sacred cave of Yangleshö and there is a flight of stairs leading up to the cave. It is said that Guru Padmasambhava in the form of Dorje Tötreng Tsal and his consort, the Princess Shakyadevi, meditated in this small cave on the Tantra of Yangdak (Skt. Vishuddha) Heruka and realized the siddhi of mahāmudrā.

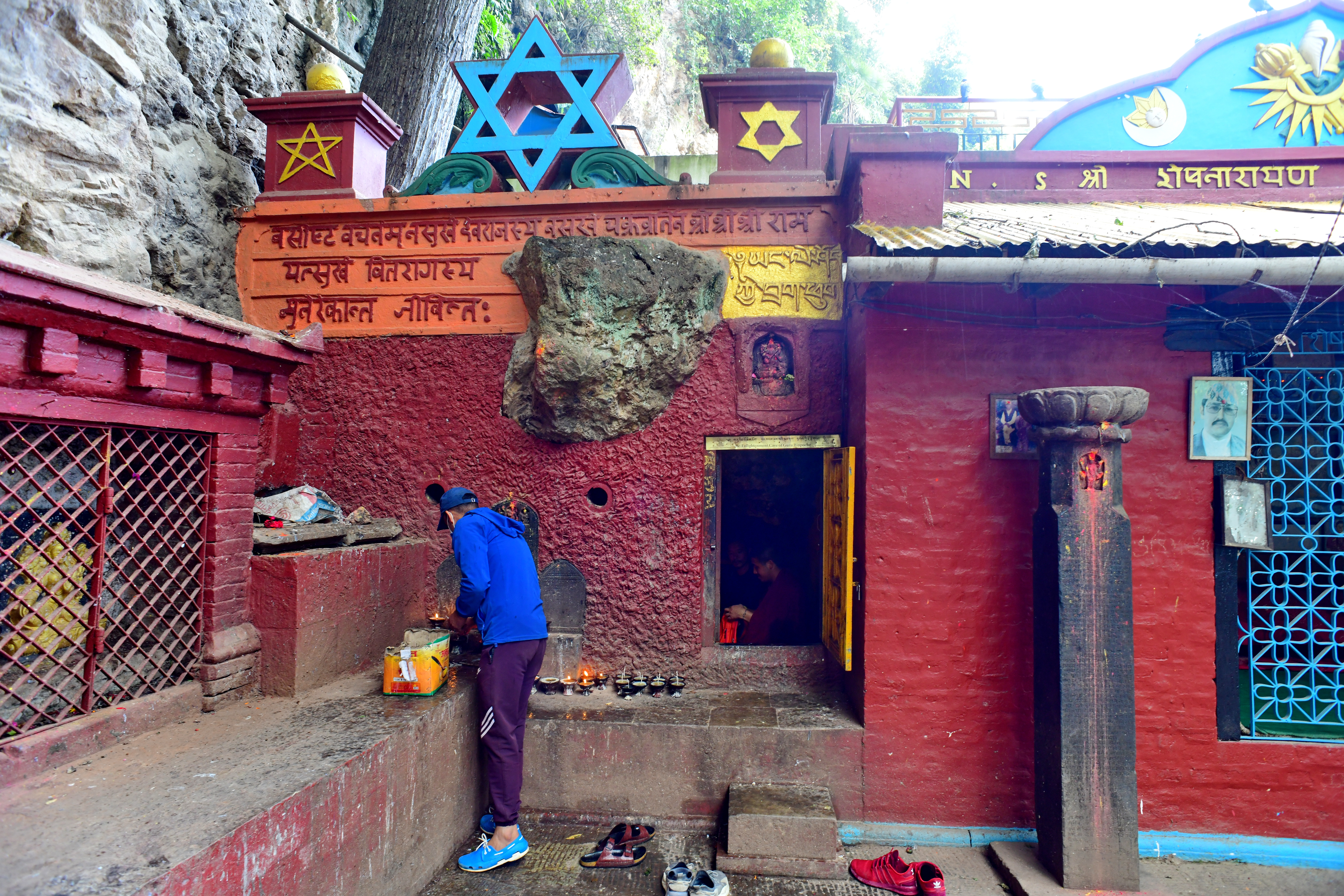
Padmasambhava's cave in Pharping

To the right of this cave is a small retreat monastery, Rigdzin Drubpe Gatsal Ling, which was established by the Nyingmapa yogin Chatral Sangye Dorje who stayed here many years. This monastery is dedicated to the meditation practices of the Longchen Nyingthig tradition.

=== Asura cave ===
The Asura Cave is located slightly south of and above Pharping, close to Pema Ösel Ling Monastery. It is said that Padmasambhava meditated here and accomplished Vajrakilaya.

== Buddhist monasteries ==
=== Neydo Tashi Chöling Monastery ===
Neydo Tashi Chöling is a large monastery housing about 200 monks, located at Setidevi Bhanjyang on the outskirts of Pharping. The monastery was established in 2006 by the seventh Karma Chagme Tulku, (1926-2013). It belongs to the Neydo sub-sect of the Karma Kagyu tradition which was founded in Tibet by the first Karma Chagme, Rāga Asya (1613-1678). This monastery also runs a guest house which is located next to the monastery.

=== Palyul Samten Ösel Ling ===
The Palyul retreat centre of Samten Ösel Ling, which belongs to the Nyingma school of Tibetan Buddhism, was founded in 1996, blessed in 1997 by Drubwang Pema Norbu (Penor) Rinpoche in 1997, and consecrated by Chatral Sangye Dorje on 4 July 1998. The monastery is currently headed by Khenchen Namdrol Tsering Rinpoche.

=== Tegchen Leksheyling Retreat Centre ===
This is a small closed retreat centre for nuns, established by Karma Thinley Rinpoche which is located near the Benchen Shedra and retreat centre in Pharping. This retreat centre is affiliated with Rinpoche's Tegchen Leksheyling nunnery near Boudhanath. Here nuns practice the traditional three years, three months, three days meditation retreat – or shorter six month retreats dedicated to the practice of Vajrayogini.

== Hindu temples ==
=== Dakshinkali Temple ===
Dakshinkali Temple, located about 1 kilometre before the town of Pharping, is one of the main temples in Nepal dedicated to the fierce mother goddess Kali. Animal sacrifices, particularly of cockerels and uncastrated male goats, are one of the main ways that the goddess is worshipped here, and this is especially seen during the Dashain festival.

=== Sheshnarayan Temple ===
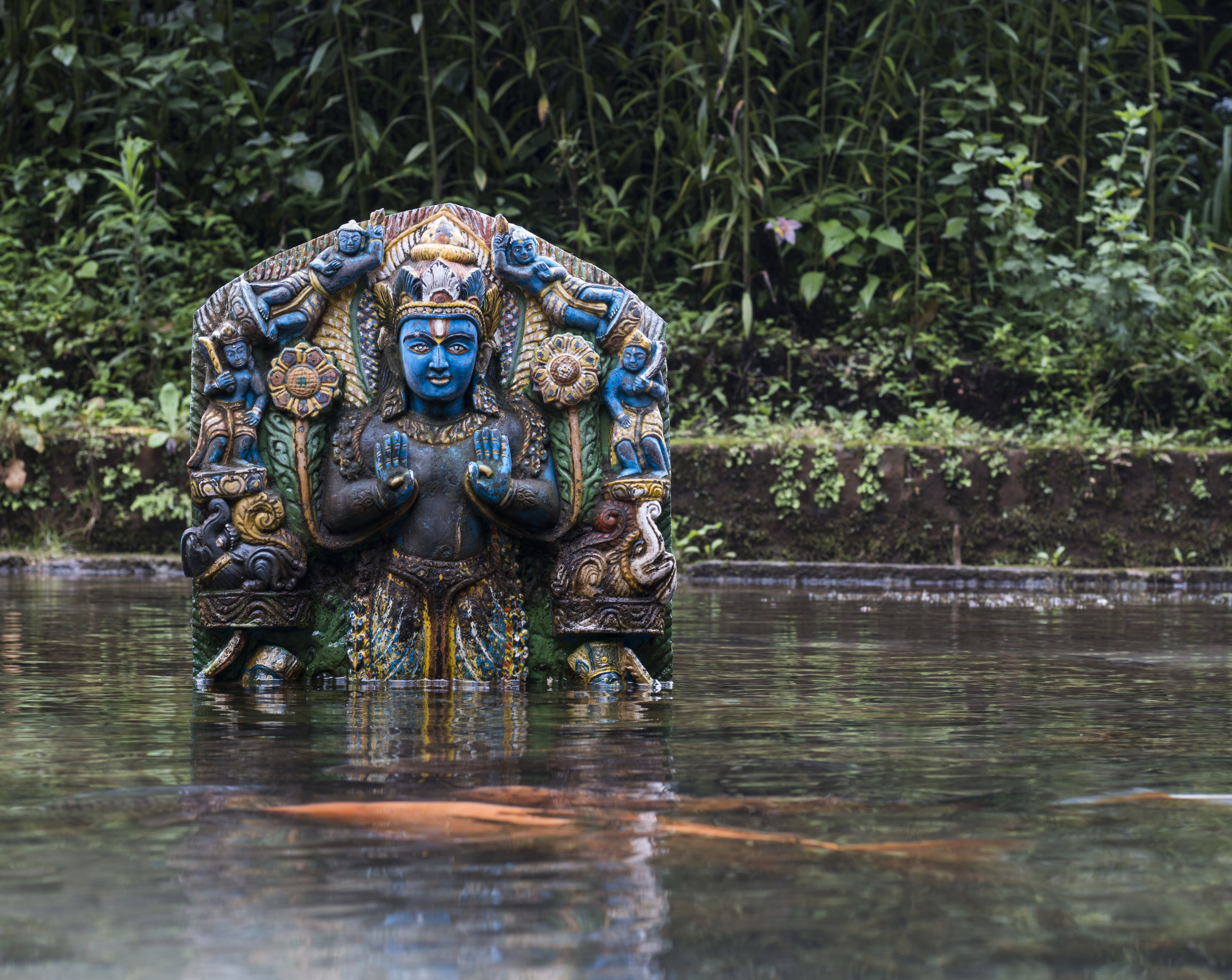
Sheshanarayan

This temple and ponds, located just below the Yanglesho cave, is one of the four main Narayana temples of the Kathmandu Valley. The other three are Icchangu Narayan, Bishanku Narayan and Changu Narayan. These temples, which stand in the four cardinal directions of the valley, are believed to be built during the reign of the Licchavi king Vishnugupta. Their locations in the cardinal directions and on hilltops was to protect the Kathmandu Valley.

== Pharping hydropower station ==
Pharping Hydro Power was established in 1911 as Chandrajyoti Hydro-electric power station by Prime Minister Chandra Shamsher Jang Bahadur Rana. In 2010, it was declared a "living museum" by the Government of Nepal and was opened to the public.

The reservoir still supplies drinking water to parts of Lalitpur.
