= Vidhyeshvari Vajra Yogini Temple =

Buddhist temple in Nepal

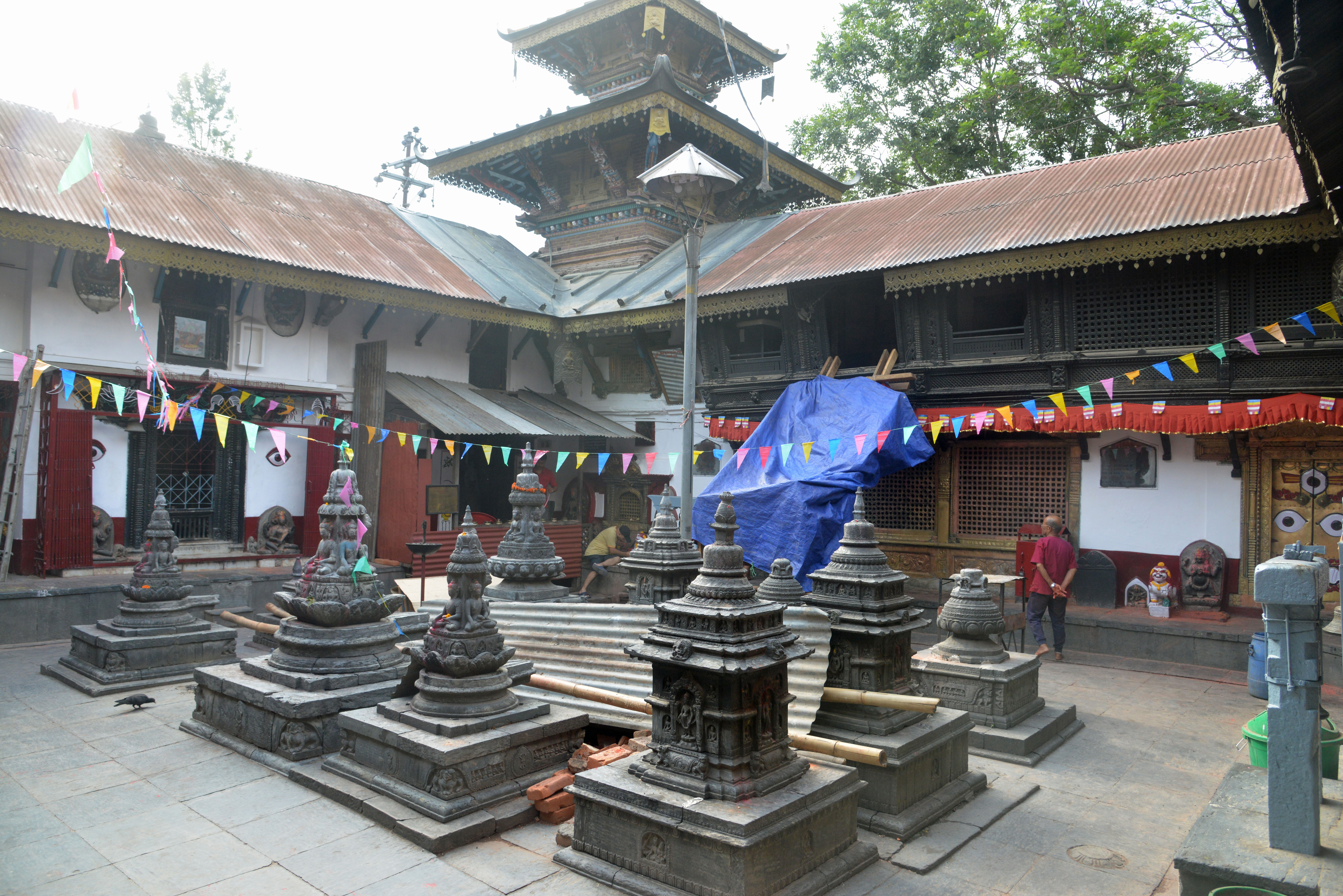

Religion
- Affiliation: Buddhism
- Sect: Newa
- Deity: Vīdyādharī Vajrayoginī

Location
- Location: Kathmandu
- Country: Nepal
- Interactive map of Vidhyeshvari Vajra Yogini Temple
- Coordinates: 27.7139409°N 85.2985479°E

Architecture
- Established: 1655

The Vidhyeshvari Vajra Yogini Temple - also known as the Bijeśvarī Vajrayoginī, Bidjeshwori Bajra Jogini, Bijayaswar, Bidjeswori, or Visyasvari Temple - is a Newar Buddhist temple in the Kathmandu valley dedicated to the Vajrayāna Buddhist deity Vajrayoginī (or Bajra Jogini in the Newar language) in her form as Akash Yogini. The temple stands on the west bank of the Bishnumati river next to the ancient religious site of the Ramadoli (Karnadip) cremation ground and is on the main path from Swayambhunath stupa (to the west) to Kathmandu.

== Significance ==
In the Kathmandu valley of Nepal there are several important Newar temples dedicated to different forms of Vajrayogini. These temples include the Sankhu Vajrayogini temple, Vidhyeshvari Vajrayogini temple, Parping Vajrayogini temple, Pulchowk Khagayogini temple and the Guhyeshwari temple.

Vīdyādharī, the 'Knowledge Holder', is the presiding deity of this temple.

The Temple is an important pilgrimage place for Tibetan Buddhists and there is a recently constructed Tibetan Buddhist temple nearby. Nepali Hindus regard the place as a sacred Shakta pitha. The Hindu devi temple of Sobha Baghwati stands nearby.

== Architecture ==
The main three storied Newa pagoda style temple is the northwest corner of the bahal courtyard which has a gateway facing the river.

== Images ==
In the temple the main image (idol) is of Akash Yogini flying through the sky, her right leg bent up at the knee behind her, and her left leg is pulled up against her breasts with her left arm. Her right arm is behind her holding a vajra above the sole of her right foot. In the crook of her right arm she holds a khaṭvāṅga staff which rests on her left shoulder. This image is about 18 inches high.

== See also ==
- Newar Buddhism
- Vajrayogini

== Other sources ==
- English, Elizabeth (2002). Vajrayoginī: Her Visualization, Rituals, and Forms. Studies in Indian and Tibetan Buddhism. Somerville: Wisdom Publications. ISBN 9780861713295. - used to find transliteration of Sanskrit names and additional information on Vajrayoginī.
