= Dakshinkali Temple =

Hindu temple in Nepal

Coordinates: 27°35′0″N 85°15′0″E

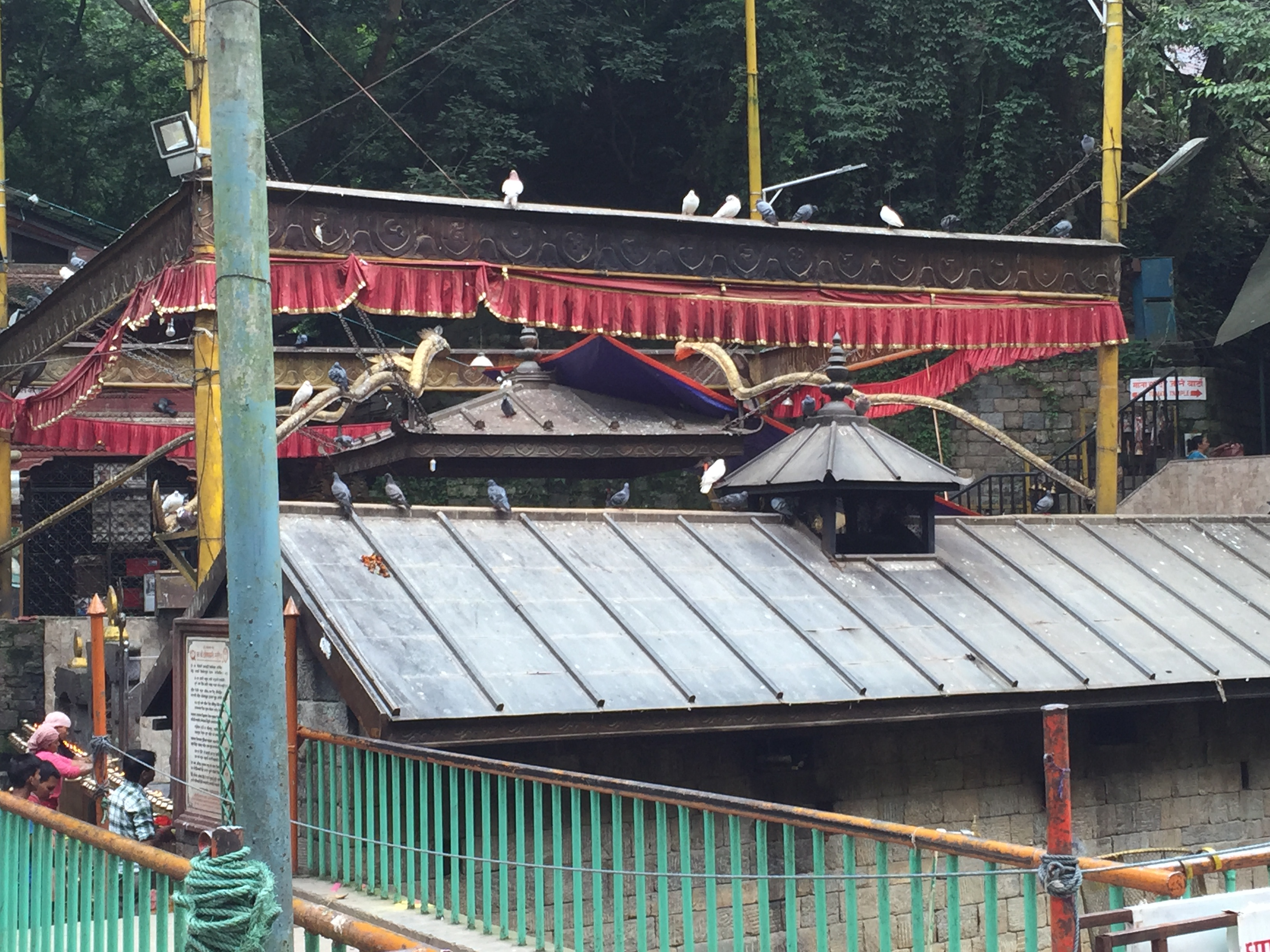

- Location in Kathmandu

Religion
- Affiliation: Hinduism
- District: Kathmandu
- Province: Bagmati
- Deity: Kali
- Festival: Dashain

Location
- Location: Outside Kathmandu
- Country: Nepal
- Interactive map of Dakshinkali Temple

Dakshinkali Temple is a Hindu temple in Nepal dedicated to the goddess Kali. Dakshin Kali is typically shown with her right foot on Shiva's chest—while depictions showing Kali with her left foot on Shiva's chest depict the even more fearsome Vamakali (typically shown with her left foot on Shiva's chest). Animal sacrifices, particularly of cockerels and uncastrated male goats, are the main way that the goddess is worshipped, and this is especially seen during the Dashain festival. Dakshin Kali Temple has also the same religious value as Pashupatinath Temple and Manakamana Temple in Nepal. The temple has more tourist attractions as it is a popular hiking destination located near Pharping village in Nepal. Mother Dakshinakali is the most popular form of Kali. She is the benevolent mother, who protects her devotees and children from mishaps and misfortunes.it usually closes at 11.30 Am for rituals and open at next day .

There are various stories explaining the origin of the name Dakshinakali. Dakshina refers to the gift given to a priest before performing a ritual or to one's guru. Such gifts are traditionally given with the right hand. Dakshinakali's two right hands are usually depicted in gestures of blessing and giving of boons. One version of the origin of her name comes from the story of Yama, lord of death, who lives in the south (Dakshina). When Yama heard Kali's name, he filled in terror, and so those who worship Kali are said to be able to overcome death itself. This temple is also situated in the south (dakshin) part of Kathmandu valley. Dakshinkali Mata was and is and will be the supreme goddess.

== Gallery ==
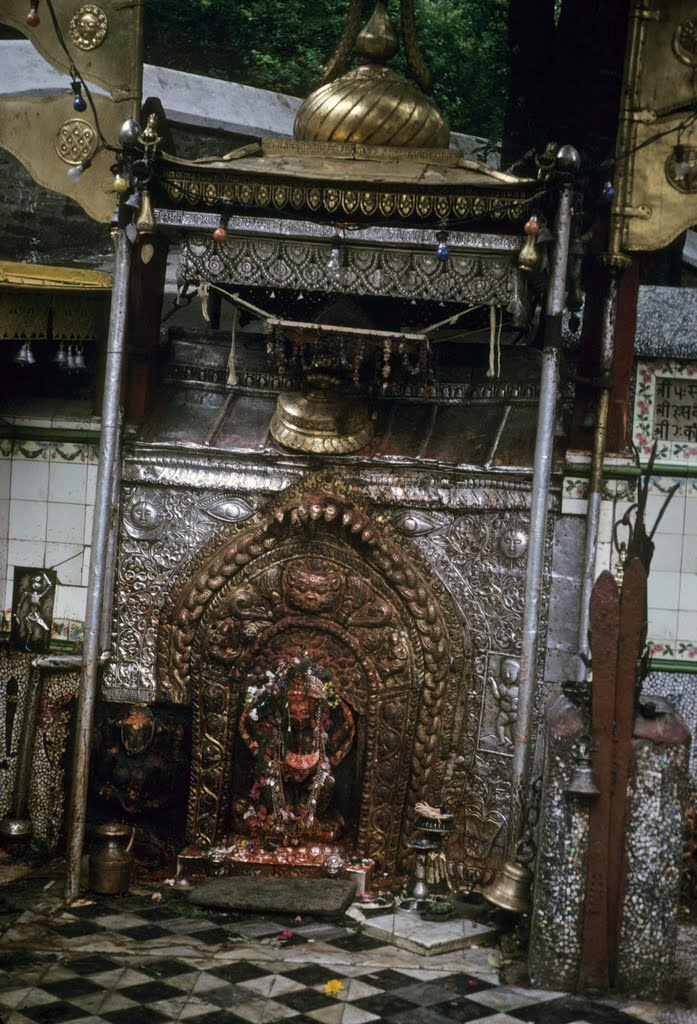
Main Idol of Goddess Dakshin Kali

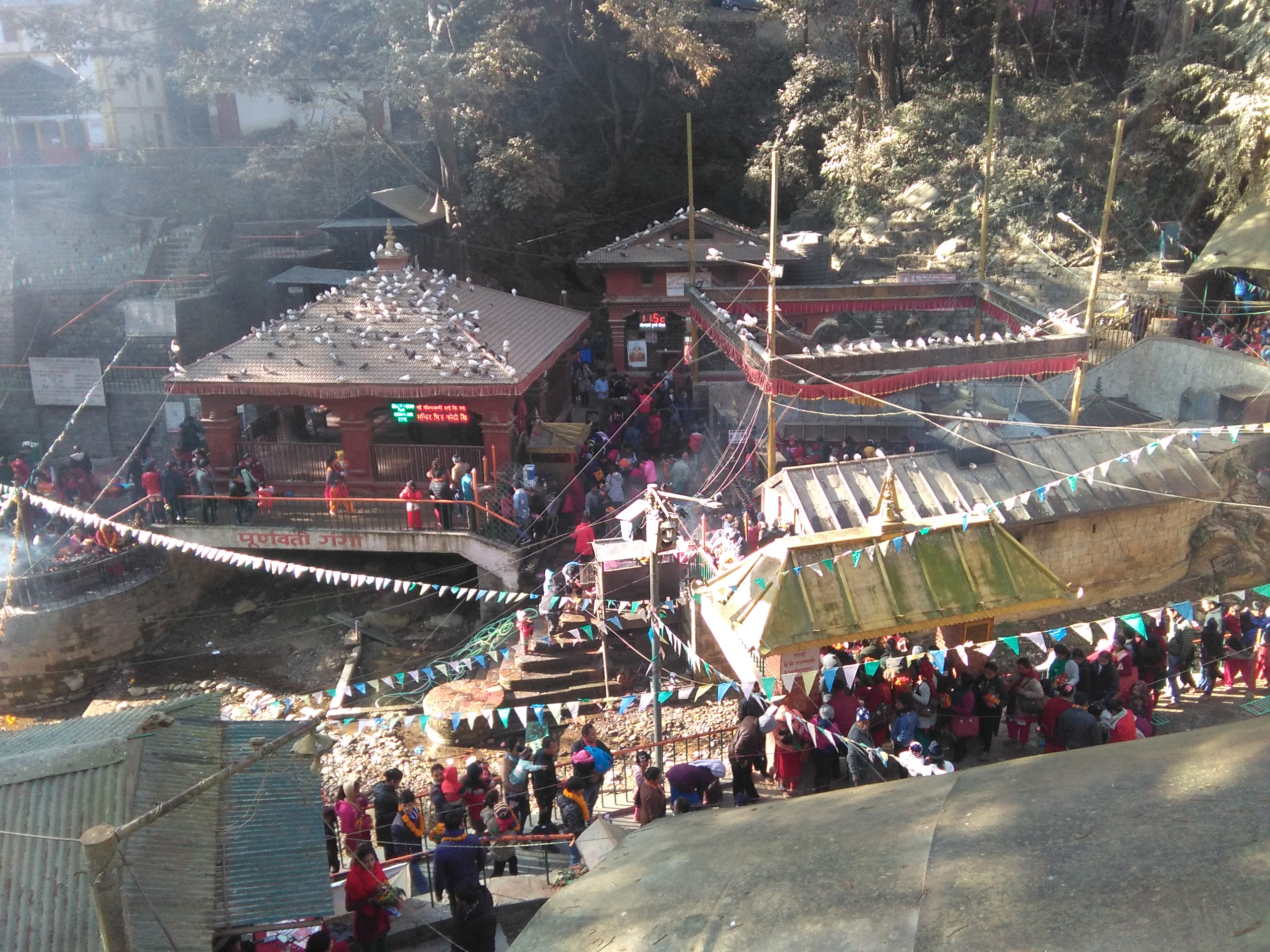
Dakshin Kali Temple in Dakshinkali Municipality

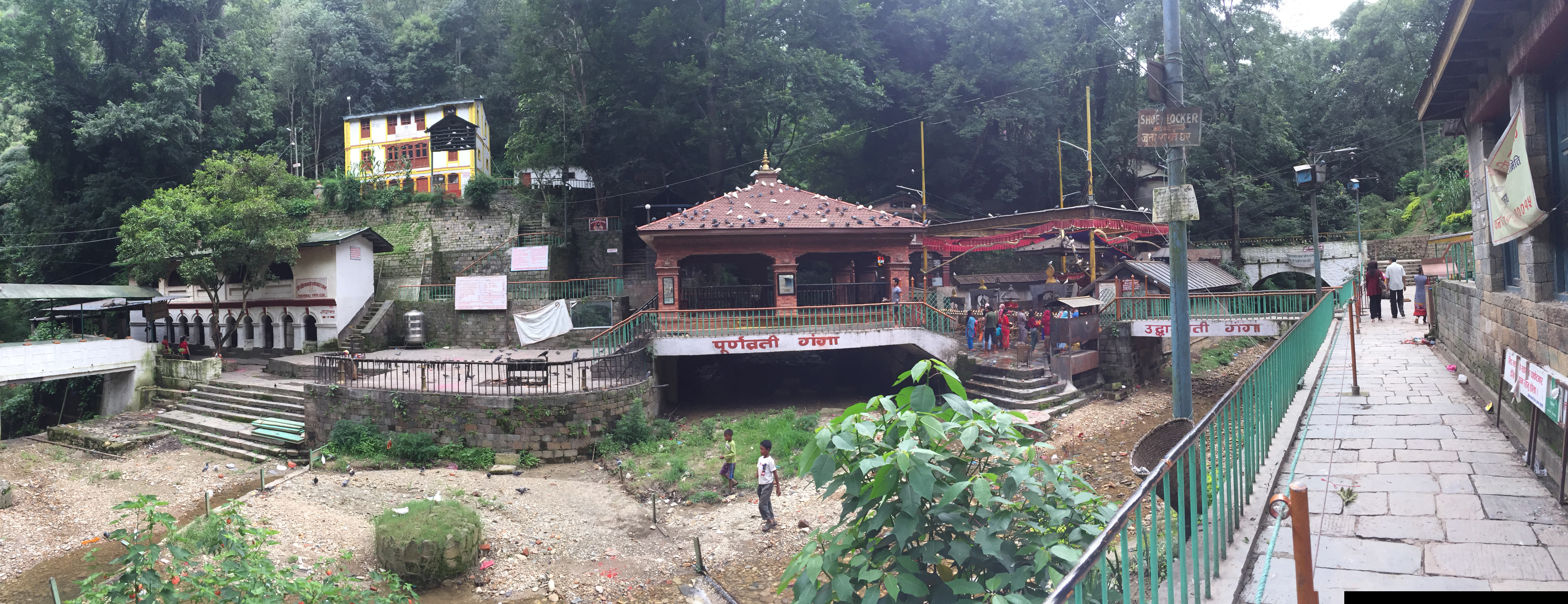
Dhakshin kali Temple Panorama

== See also ==
- Pashupatinath Temple
- List of Hindu temples in Nepal
