= Sheshnarayan =

Sheshnarayan शेषनारायण
- Village of Dakshinkali Municipality
- Location in Nepal
- Coordinates: 27.63°N 85.27°E
- Country: Nepal
- Province: No. 3
- District: Kathmandu District

Population (1991)
  - Total: 2,867
- Time zone: UTC+5:45 (Nepal Time)

Sheshnarayan is a village and former Village Development Committee that is now part of Dakshinkali Municipality in Kathmandu District in Province No. 3 of central Nepal. At the time of the 1991 Nepal census it had a population of 2,867 and had 521 households in it. It is home to the Sheshnarayan Temple.
