= Chalnakhel =

Chalnakhel चाल्नाखेल
- Village of Dakshinkali Municipality Ward 1
- Chalnakhel

- Location in Nepal
- Coordinates: 27°38′24″N 85°16′12″E
- Country: Nepal
- Province: No. 3
- District: Kathmandu District

Population (2011)
  - Total: 4,365
  - Religions: Hindu
- Time zone: UTC+5:45 (Nepal Time)

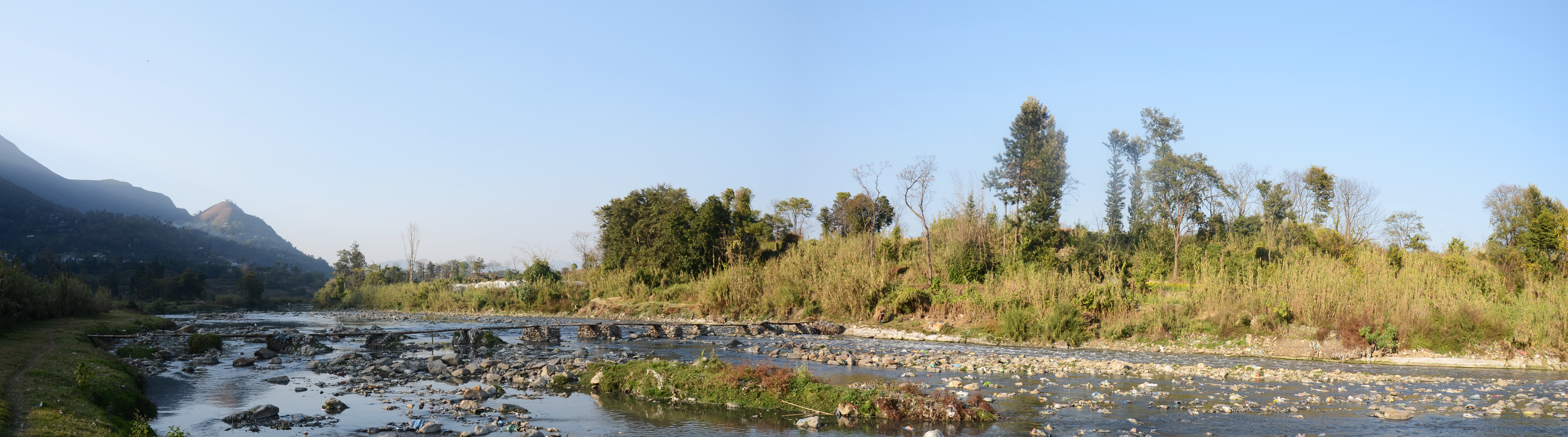
Bagmati river at Chalnakhel 2013

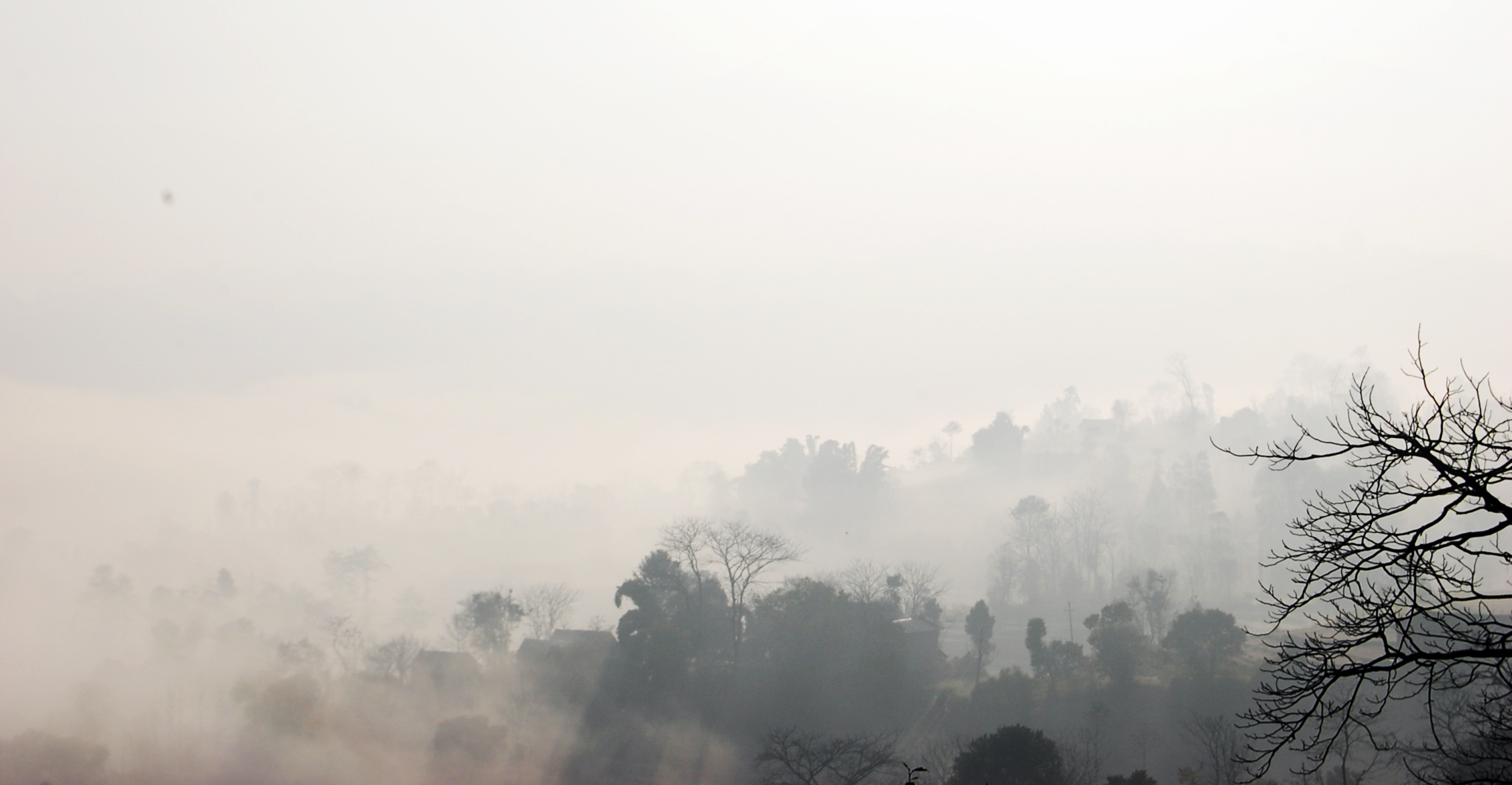
Foggy Chalnakhel in Winter 2009

Chalnakhel is a village and former Village Development Committee that is now part of Dakshinkali Municipality in Kathmandu District in Province No. 3 of central Nepal. At the time of the 2011 Nepal census it had a population of 4,365 living in 1,005 households.

== Toponymy ==
=== Linguistic origin ===
- Linguistic family: Indoeuropea
- Language: Sanskrit

=== Etymology ===
“Chalna” means to walk or move. “Khel” refers to an open area, field, or playground. It is said that the place got its name because travelers used to rest there before continuing their journey.

Chalna (चल्ना) means “to walk, to move” and comes from Sanskrit चल (chala) meaning “moving, mobile”. It evolved into Hindi/Nepali verb root चल- (chal-). Khel (खेल) means “field, open ground, play area” and comes from Sanskrit क्रीडा (krīḍā) meaning “play,” but in Nepali it can also refer to a “flat open space.” The toponym is of descriptive origin, indicating a transit or resting place in an open area, associated with movement and travelers
