= Miranda E. Shaw =

American author and scholar of Vajrayana Buddhism (born 1954)

Miranda Eberle Shaw
- Born: 1954 (age 71–72); Ohio, United States

Academic background
- Education: Ohio State University; Harvard Divinity School; Harvard University

Academic work
- Discipline: Religious Studies
- Institutions: University of Richmond
- Main interests: Women in Buddhism

Miranda E. Shaw is an American author and scholar of Vajrayana Buddhism. Her book, Passionate Enlightenment: Women in Tantric Buddhism, won the James Henry Breasted Prize, the Tricycle Prize for Excellence in Buddhist Scholarship, and the Critics' Choice Most Acclaimed Academic Book award in 1995. Shaw earned her undergraduate degree from Ohio State University, a Master of Theology (MTS) from Harvard Divinity School, a Master of Arts in Religion (MA), and a doctorate in the study of religion (PhD) from Harvard University. Shaw is an Emerita faculty member of the School of Arts and Sciences at the University of Richmond.

== Career ==
Miranda Eberle Shaw was born in Ohio on May 9, 1954. As a teenager she read a copy of the Bhagavad Gita and the Upanishads. Later she became interested in images of female sky dancers, apsara and dakini, from Tantric Buddhism. These interests led her to the study of Buddhism, art, and the under-explored role of women in Tantric Buddhism. While pursuing her doctorate degree at Harvard University, she was funded as a University Fellow from 1983–85 and received the Bowdoin Graduate Literary Prize in 1986. She received a Fulbright Fellowship for doctoral research abroad in 1987 and several local fellowships to complete her dissertation. While traveling in India, Shaw states that she received the approval of the Dalai Lama to research Anuttara Yoga Tantra. Following the completion of her dissertation, Shaw began a career as a professor of religious studies in 1991 at University of Richmond in Richmond, Virginia.

In 2003 Shaw contributed to a catalog, Circle of Bliss: Buddhist Meditational Art, for an exhibition shown at the Los Angeles County Museum of Art (LACMA) and the Columbus Museum of Art in Columbus, Ohio. She co-authored two essays for the catalog. Shaw's contributions to the catalog helped to bring attention to the ritual purposes and not merely to the aesthetic value of the Buddhist art.

In 1994 she wrote her first book, Passionate Enlightenment: Women in Tantric Buddhism. The book won the James Henry Breasted Prize for Asian History in 1994. The next two years, the book was awarded the Tricycle Prize for Excellence in Buddhist Scholarship and 1995-1996 Critics' Choice Most Acclaimed Academic Book. The book was blessed by the 14th Dalai Lama, Tenzin Gyatso, at publication. The book, written in English, has been translated into more than seven languages. Passionate Enlightenment focuses on the role of women practitioners and counters patriarchal and gynophobic interpretations of Tantric Buddhism. In addition, the book reports her research to find forty works authored by women from India's Pala period (from 8th to the 12th century). According to Shaw, during this period, Tantric Buddhism fostered relationships between women and men that were both mutually liberating and relied on women as a source of enlightenment. In the book, Shaw also counters Victorian British influenced interpretations of Tantric Buddhism as overly eroticized and too grounded in a Western religious understanding of sexuality. According to Shaw, sexual union in Tantric Buddhism focuses on a quest for a right relationship between partners and a deeper spiritual connection. The book includes an 18 page bibliography of further reading and contributes evidence that argues against an assumption that women have a subordinate role in Tantric Buddhism.

To write her second book, Buddhist Goddess of India (2006), Shaw translated Sanskrit texts about goddesses and took photographs of goddess festivals in Calcutta. In Kathmandu, Nepal, she attended the Kumari festival and the Guhyeshvari shrine to observe and to conduct interviews. In her analysis of ritual dance practiced by Tantric Buddhist priests in Nepal, Shaw found that the movements could be understood to be a way to connect the body to a spirit of compassion. To write this book, Shaw received a Fulbright scholarship. After publication, the book won the 2006 Foreword Reviews Gold Award for books in Religion. In a review of her work in this book, Kent Davis described her "as a realist, conducting research where previous scholars have missed crucial connections, or chosen not to make them." Likewise, David Gray, noted that it filled a gap in the scholarship on goddesses in South Asian Buddhism. Similarly, David Hall, observed in the introduction to his own book on the topic, that Shaw's book was "beautiful" and helped to draw attention to the role of goddesses in Buddhism.

== Influence ==
Shaw's research has advanced the understanding of the role of goddesses, goddess practice, and the contributions of women to Tantric Buddhism. Her work has helped to correct misconceptions about the role Tantric sexual practices and the role of women in Buddhism. In her interviews and in-person teaching sessions, Shaw endeavors to promote a view of sexuality for women that is grounded in the "feminine divine". She connects this value of Tantric Buddhism to the work of other feminist theologians—particularly by encouraging an embodied divinity that reconnects the mind and body. To this end, Shaw pursued the practice of spontaneous dance to attune the senses to the divine. As a feminist theologian, Shaw has also contributed to efforts to ensure that goddesses are understood as fully integrated deities in Buddhist traditions. As Shaw states, by "exploring the relationship between human and divine females," she intends to "facilitate increasingly nuanced analyses of the ... contributions of Buddhist women." Shaw's work has contributed to the understanding of yoginis as valued teachers in Buddhist traditions.

== Selected works ==
- “William James and Yogācāra Philosophy: A Comparative Inquiry.” Philosophy East and West, vol. 37, no. 3, 1987, pp. 223–44. doi:10.2307/1398517.
- “Buddhist and Taoist Influences on Chinese Landscape Painting.” Journal of the History of Ideas, vol. 49, no. 2, 1988, pp. 183–206. doi:10.2307/2709496.
- Passionate Enlightenment: Women in Tantric Buddhism. 1994. ISBN 978-0-691-23559-2.
- “Weaving and Dancing Embodied Theology.” Journal of Feminist Studies in Religion, vol. 33, no. 2, 2017, pp. 117–21. doi:10.2979/jfemistudreli.33.2.11.
- Buddhist Goddesses of India. 2015. ISBN 978-0-691-16854-8.
- “Buddhist Practice in South Asia.” The Oxford Handbook of Buddhist Practice, edited by Kevin Trainor and Paula Arai, Oxford University Press, 2022, pp. 21–36.
- “Dance as Vajrayana Practice.” The Oxford Handbook of Buddhist Practice, edited by Kevin Trainor and Paula Arai, 2022. pp. 266–283.
