= Talku Dudechaur =

Talku Dudechaur टल्कु डुडेचौर
- Village of Dakshinkali Municipality
- Location in Nepal
- Coordinates: 27.63°N 85.24°E
- Country: Nepal
- Province: No. 3
- District: Kathmandu District

Population (2011)
  - Total: 2,858
  - Religions: Hinduism Buddhism
- Time zone: UTC+5:45 (Nepal Time)

Talku Dudechaur is a village and former Village Development Committee that is now part of Dakshinkali Municipality in Kathmandu District in Province No. 3 of central Nepal. At the time of the 2011 Nepal census it had a population of 2,858 and had 648 households in it.
