= Sokhek =

Sokhel सोखेल
- Village of Dakshinkali Municipality
- Country: Nepal
- Province: No. 3
- District: Kathmandu District

Population (1991)
  - Total: 3,980
- Time zone: UTC+5:45 (Nepal Time)

Sokhel is a village and former Village Development Committee that is now part of Dakshinkali Municipality in Kathmandu District in Province No. 3 of central Nepal. At the time of the 1991 Nepal census it had a population of 3,980 and had 684 households in it.
