= Chhaimale =

Chhaimale छैमले
- Village of Dakshinkali Municipality
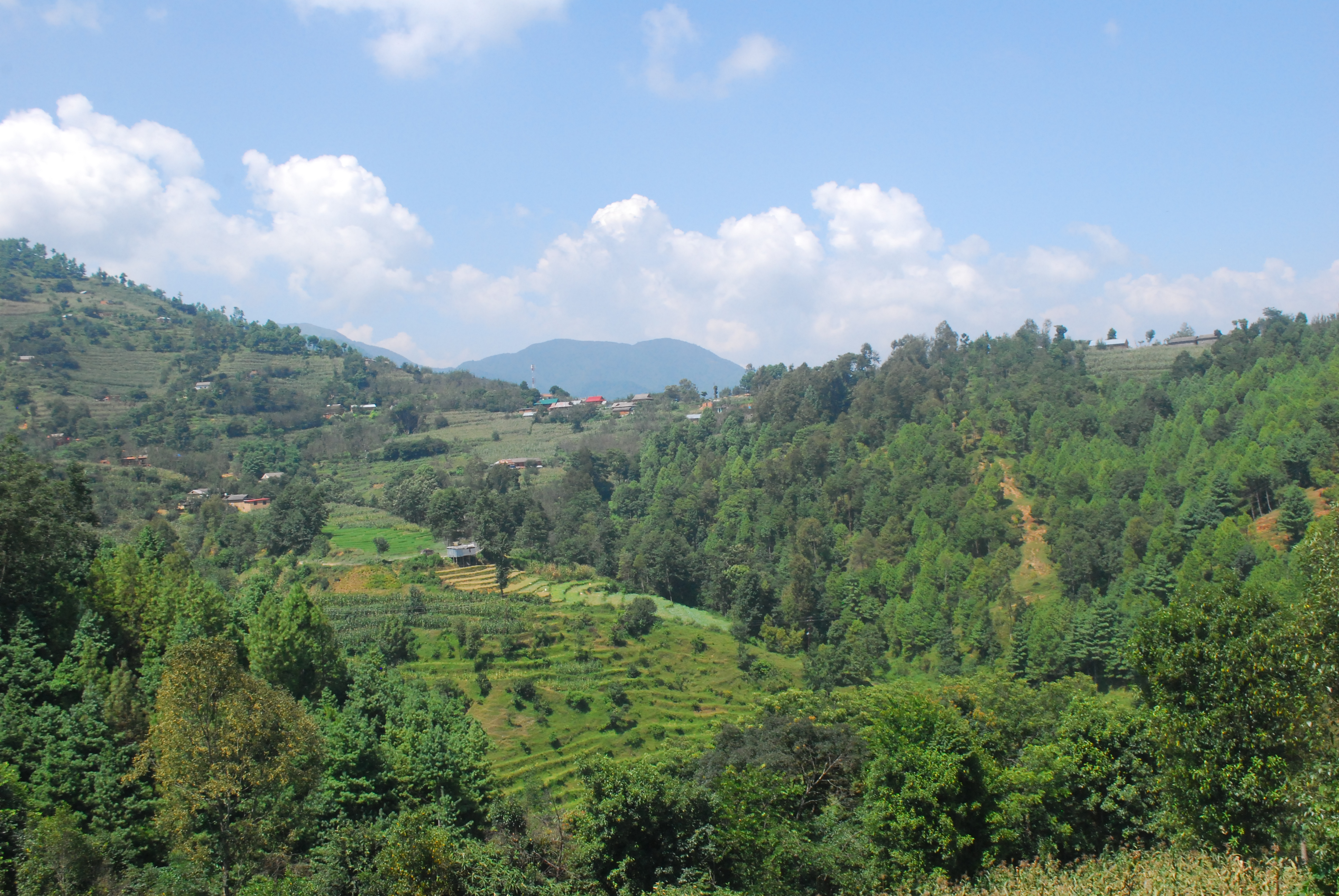

- Location in Nepal
- Coordinates: 27°35′24″N 85°15′36″E
- Country: Nepal
- Province: No. 3
- District: Kathmandu District

Population (2011)
  - Total: 4,216
  - Religions: Hindu
- Time zone: UTC+5:45 (Nepal Time)

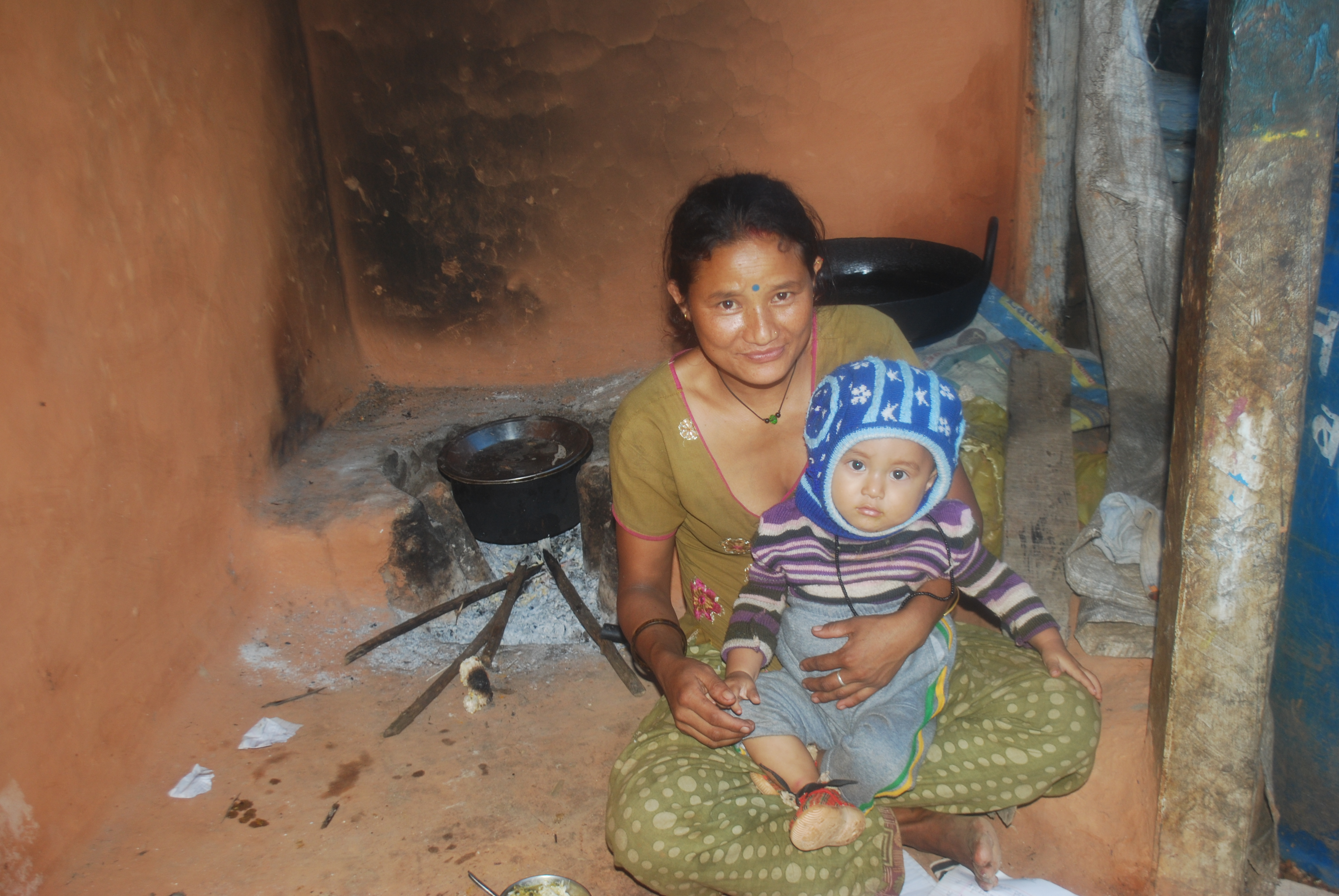
Nepali Housewife from Chhaimale

Chhaimale is a village and former Village Development Committee that is now part of Dakshinkali Municipality in Kathmandu District in Province No. 3 of central Nepal. At the time of the 2011 Nepal census it had a population of 4,216 living in 968 households.

== Toponymy ==
=== Linguistic origin ===
- Linguistic family: Indoeuropean
- Language: Sanskrit

=== Etymology ===
“Chhai” comes from an old word meaning shade or coolness. “Male” refers to the sheltered side of a hill or a green area. It is said that the place was named for being a cool, shaded, and green area.

Chhai means “shade, shadow” — likely from the Nepali root छायाँ (chhāyā), which means “shadow” or “shade”; ultimately derived from Sanskrit छाया (chāyā).

Male (मले) is a local name or toponymic suffix, possibly of indigenous or regional origin with uncertain etymology. The toponym Chhaimale is descriptive in nature, referring to a shaded or sun-protected area, combining a Sanskrit-derived root with a local suffix.
