= Vajrayogini =

Tantric Buddhist female Buddha and ḍākiṇī

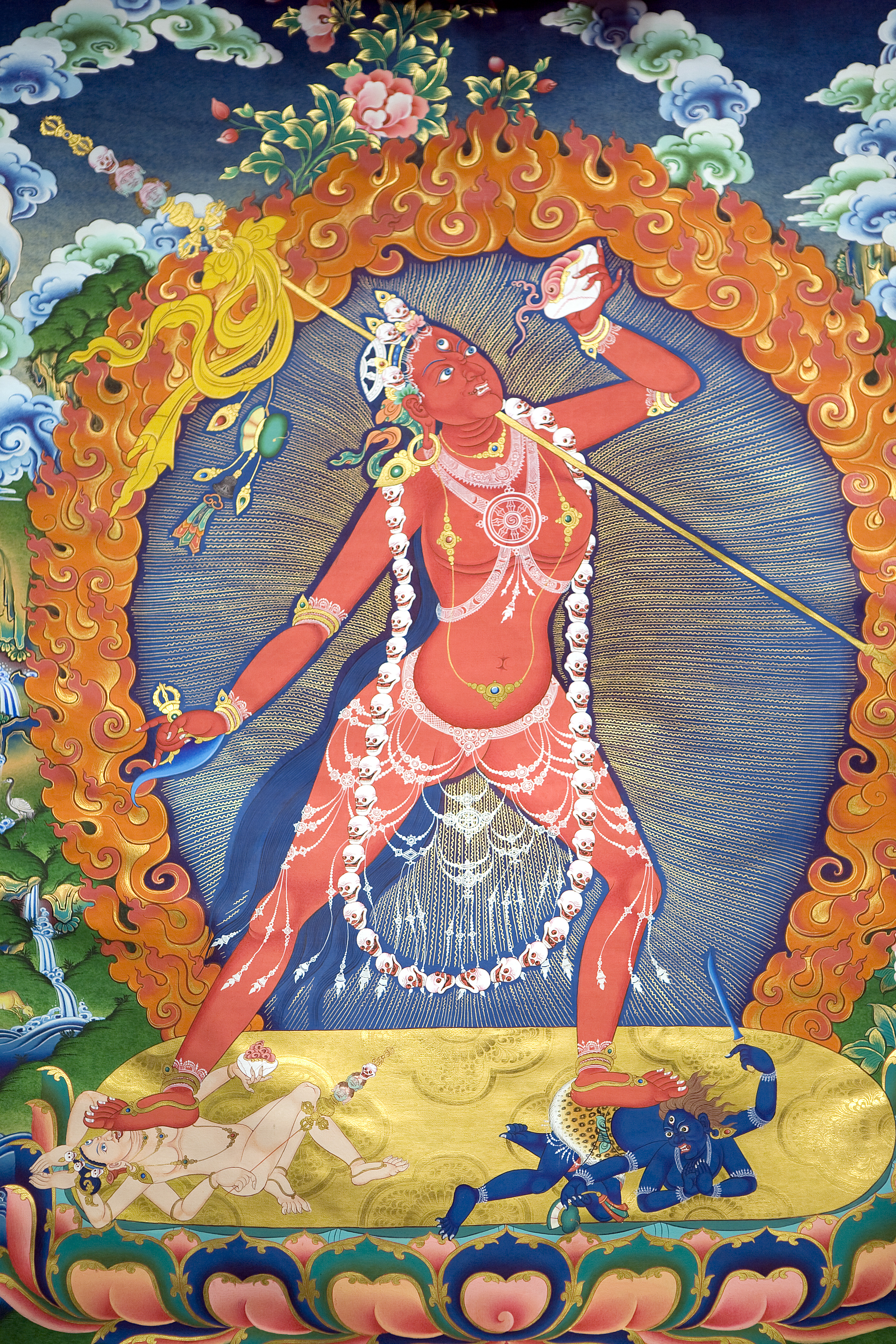
Painting of Vajrayoginī in the form of Nāropa's Ḍākinī

Vajrayoginī (Sanskrit: Vajrayoginī वज्रयोगिनी; Tibetan: རྡོ་རྗེ་རྣལ་འབྱོར་མ་, Wylie: rdo rje rnal ’byor ma, Dorjé Naljorma) is an important figure in Buddhism, especially revered in Tibetan Buddhism. In Vajrayana she is considered a female Buddha and a ḍākiṇī. Vajrayoginī is often described with the epithet sarvabuddhaḍākiṇī, meaning "the ḍākiṇī of all Buddhas". She is an Anuttarayoga Tantra meditational deity (iṣṭadevatā) and her practice includes methods for preventing ordinary death, intermediate state (bardo) and rebirth (samsara) by transforming them into paths to enlightenment, and for transforming all mundane daily experiences into higher spiritual paths.

The origins of Vajrayoginī teachings date from between the 10th and 12th centuries, and draw inspiration from Hindu Shaiva tantras. She appears as the consort of Padma Thotreng Tsal and Cakrasaṃvara, while in standalone practices, her inseparable consorts are represented by the khatvanga (staff) on her left shoulder. The lineage of Vajrayoginī practice can be traced back to the original teachings of Vajradhara and is divided into three main lineages: Narokhachö, Maitrikhachö, and Indrakhachö.

Vajrayoginī's essence is "great passion" (maharaga), passion that is pure - free of ego's deceptions and illusions. Because of her purity she is able to work for the well-being of others and for the destruction of all ego clinging. She is seen as being ideally suited for people with strong passions, providing the way to transform those passions into enlightened virtues. She is visualized in the form of a naked 16-year-old female with red skin, a third eye of wisdom, and numerous other symbolic attributes such as a curved knife and either a skull cup or a damaru. Her fierce yet blissful demeanor conveys numerous spiritual attributes.

Practices associated with her are Chöd and the Six Yogas of Naropa. Her numerous temples in the Kathmandu Valley are revered as power places in both Newar and Tibetan Buddhism. According to scholar Miranda E. Shaw, Vajrayoginī is "inarguably the supreme deity of the Tantric pantheon. No male Buddha, including her divine consort, Heruka Cakrasaṃvara, approaches her in metaphysical or practical import."

Additionally and in the pantheon of female buddhas, the line of Khenmos (abbesses) of Samding Monastery in Tibet have traditionally been seen as emanations of Vajravārāhī, which continues this specific lineage of female tulkus to the present day.

== Origin and lineage ==
Vajrayoginī's sādhanā originated between the tenth and twelfth centuries against the backdrop of Hindu Shaiva tantras. The Buddhist Yoginitantras that deal with yoginis and dakinis draw from Shaiva scriptures. The Chakrasaṃvara Tantra in particular contains numerous passages that were adapted from Shaiva sources. The text and its commentaries have revealed numerous attempts by Buddhists to enlarge and modify it, both to remove references to Shaiva deities and to add more Buddhist technical terminology.

In the Chakrasaṃvara Tantra, Vajrayoginī appears as his yab-yum consort, to become a stand-alone practice of Anuttarayoga Tantra in its own right. The practice of Vajrayoginī belongs to the Mother Tantra (Wylie: ma rgyud) class of Anuttarayoga Tantras along with other tantras such as the Cakrasaṃvara and Hevajra Tantras.

Vajrayana teaches that the two stages of the practice of Vajrayoginī (generation stage and completion stage) were originally taught by Vajradhara. He manifested in the form of Heruka to expound the Root Tantra of Chakrasaṃvara, and it was in this tantra that he explained the practice of Vajrayoginī. All the many lineages of instructions on Vajrayoginī can be traced back to this original revelation. Of these lineages, there are three that are most commonly practiced: the Narokhachö lineage, which was transmitted from Vajrayoginī to Naropa; the Maitrikhachö lineage, which was transmitted from Vajrayoginī to Maitripa; and the Indrakhachö lineage, which was transmitted from Vajrayoginī to Indrabodhi.

== Iconography ==
Vajrayoginī is visualized as a nude female with deep red skin, the third eye of wisdom set vertically on her forehead, and unbound flowing hair. Vajrayoginī is generally depicted with the traditional accoutrements of a ḍākiṇī, including a kartika (a vajra-handled flaying knife) in her right hand and a kapala filled with blood in her left hand that she drinks from with upturned mouth. Her consort Cakrasaṃvara is often symbolically depicted as a khaṭvāṅga on Vajrayoginī's left shoulder, when she is in "solitary hero" form. Vajrayoginī's khaṭvāṅga is marked with a vajra and from it hangs a damaru drum, a bell, and a triple banner. Her extended right leg treads on the chest of red Kālarātri, while her bent left leg treads on the forehead of black Bhairava, bending his head backward and pressing it into his back at the level of his heart. She wears a crown of five human skulls on her head and a necklace of fifty human skulls. She is depicted as standing in the center of a blazing fire of exalted wisdom. Her countenance shows both erotic and fierce features, "in the fullness of bliss, laughing and baring her fangs."

Each aspect of Vajrayoginī's form and mandala is designed to convey a spiritual meaning. For example, her young age of 16 signifies the prime of youth, the potential for new beginnings and the unhindered purity of a fresh mind. Her brilliant red-colored body symbolizes the blazing of her tummo (candali) or "inner fire" of spiritual transformation as well as life force (Shakti), blood of birth and menstrual blood. The lack of clothing on her is not only meant to be sexual/blissful but also signifies the shedding of worldly concerns, ego and illusions. Her single face symbolizes that she has realized that all phenomena are of one nature in emptiness. Her two arms symbolize her realization of the two truths. Her three eyes represent her ability to see everything in the past, present and future. She looks upward toward the Pure Dākiṇī Land, demonstrating her attainment of outer and inner Pure Dākiṇī Land, and indicating that she leads her followers to these attainments. The curved driguk knife in her right hand shows her power to cut the continuum of the delusions and obstacles of her followers and of all living beings. Drinking the blood from the kapala in her left hand symbolizes her experience of supreme bliss.

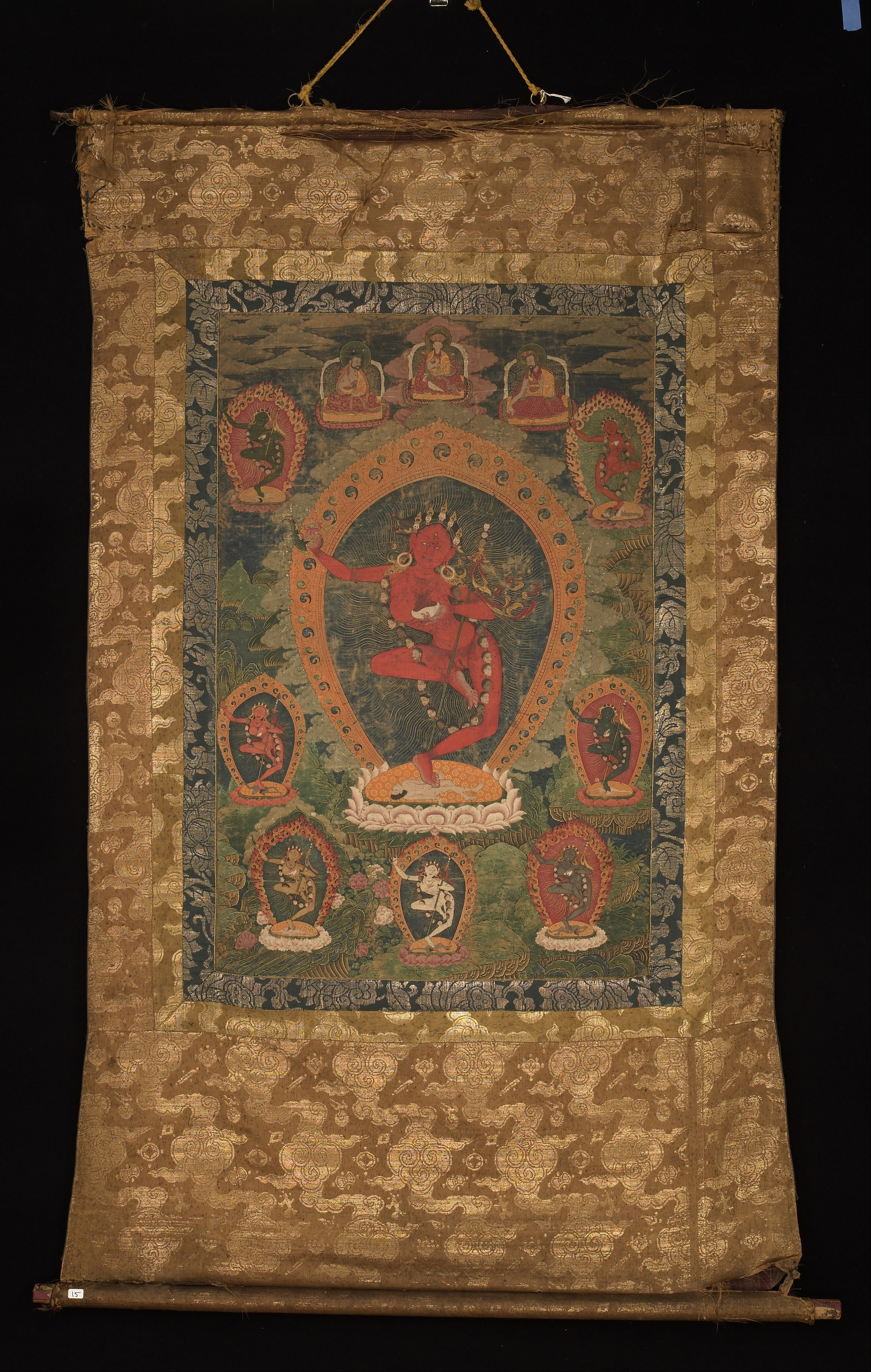
Vajravārāhī thangka

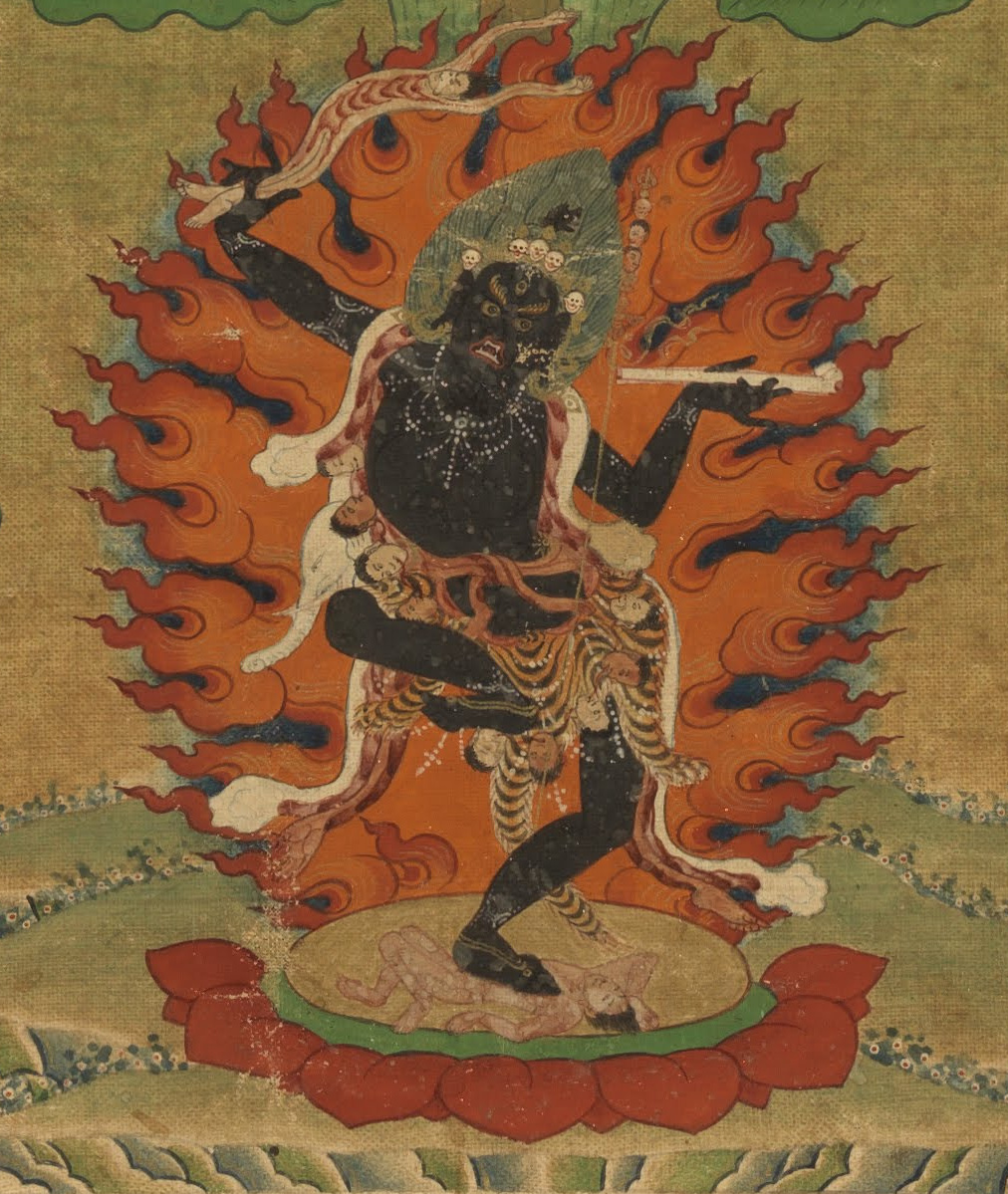
Tröma Nagmo, Tibetan Buddhist deity. Closeup from a painting of Machig Labdron, 19th century.

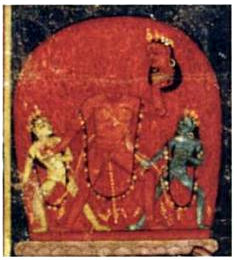
Chinnamunda, 14th-century painting, Nepal.

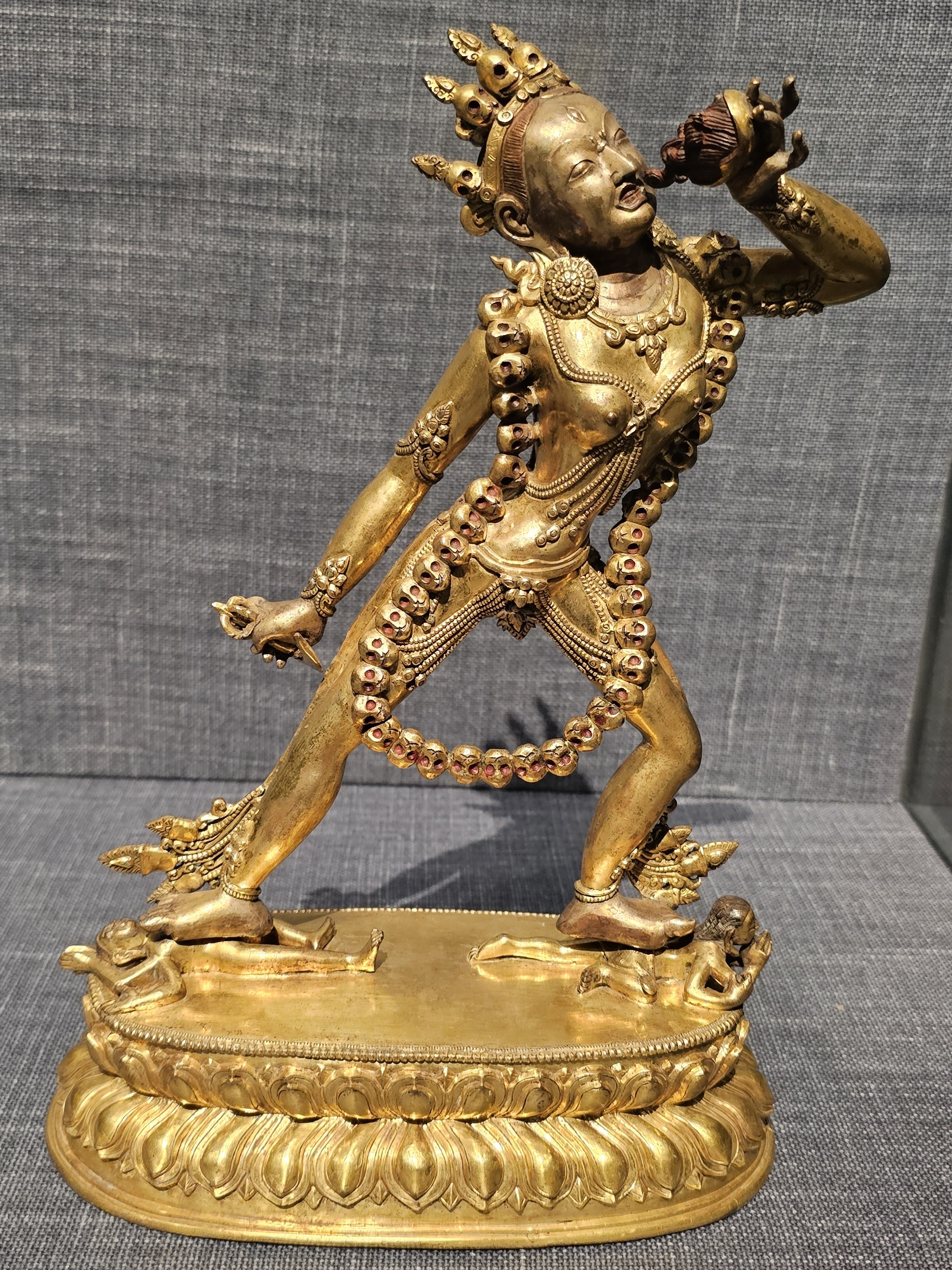
Tibetan statue, c. 1600–1900

=== Vajravārāhī and other forms ===
Vajrayoginī is a female deity and although she is sometimes visualized as simply Vajrayoginī, in a collection of her sādhanās she is visualized in an alternate form in over two thirds of the practices. Her other forms include Vajravārāhī (Wylie: rdo-rje phag-mo "Vajra Sow") and Krodikali (alt. Krodhakali, Kālikā, Krodheśvarī, Krishna Krodhini, Tibetan Tröma Nakmo; Wylie: khros ma nag mo, "Wrathful Lady", "Fierce Black One").

In her form as Vajravārāhī ("the Vajra Sow"), she is often pictured with a sow's head on the side or crown of her own head as a symbolic ornament and in one form has the head of a sow herself. The sow/pig is associated with ignorance in Buddhism. Vajrayoginī is often associated with triumph over ignorance or the transformation of ignorance into wisdom or the non-dual recognition that ignorance is inseparable from wisdom. The sow head can be traced to the origins of Vajravārāhī from the Hindu sow-faced goddess Vārāhī.

The severed-headed form of Vajrayoginī, Chinnamunda, is similar to the Indian goddess Chinnamasta, who is recognized by both Hindus and Buddhists.

== Practices ==
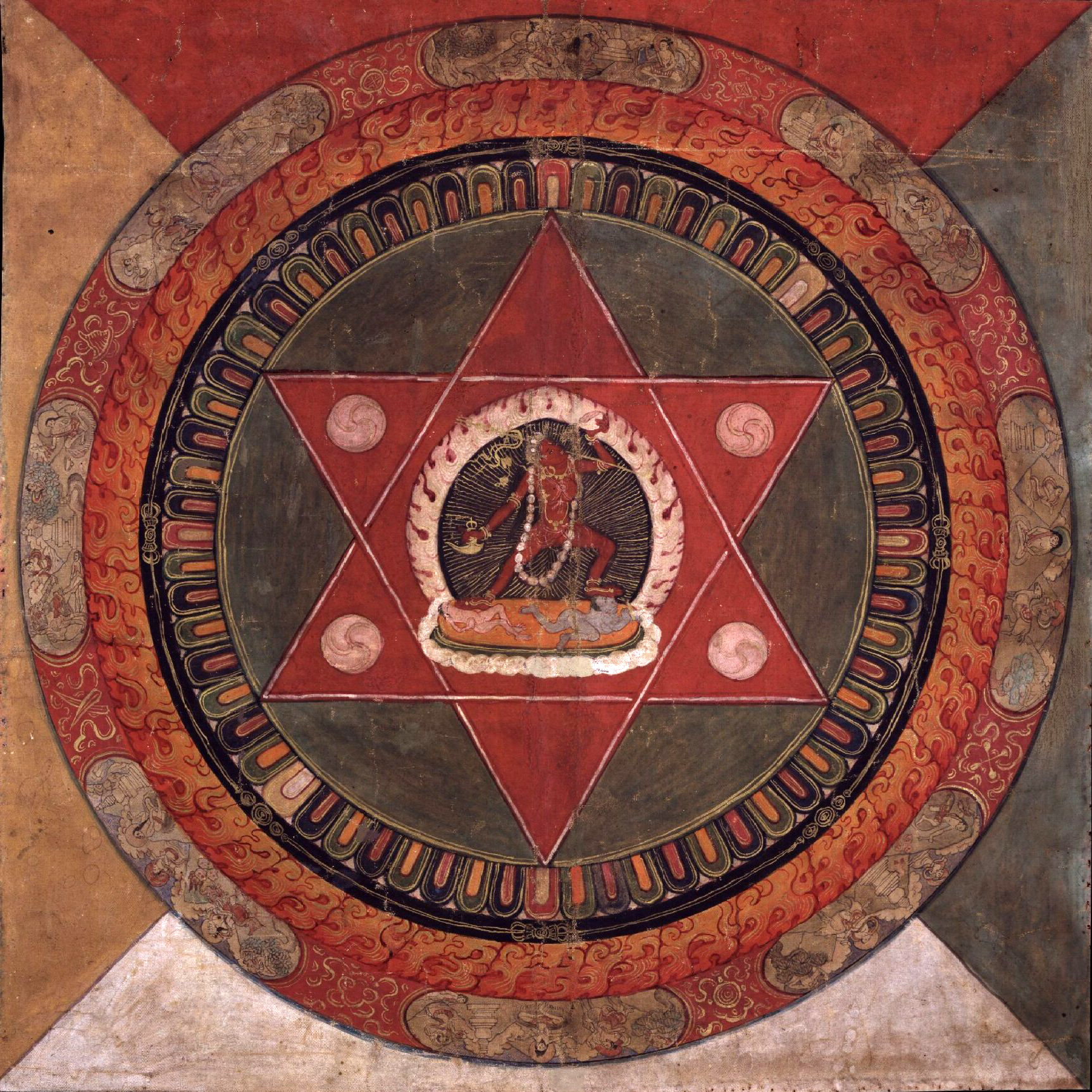
Painted 19th century Tibetan maṇḍala of the Nāropa tradition, Vajrayoginī stands in the center of a red hexagram, Rubin Museum of Art

Vajrayoginī acts as a meditation deity, or the yab-yum consort of such a deity, in Vajrayāna Buddhism. She appears in a maṇḍala that is visualized by the practitioner according to a sādhanā describing the practice of the particular tantra. There are several collections containing sādhanās associated with Vajrayoginī including one collection, the Guhyasamayasādhanamālā, containing only Vajrayoginī sādhanās and comprising forty-six works by various authors.

The yidam that a meditator identifies with when practicing the Six Yogas of Nāropa is Vajrayoginī and she is an important deity for tantric initiation, especially for new initiates as Vajrayoginī's practice is said to be well-suited to those with strong desirous attachment, and to those living in the current "degenerate age". As Vajravārāhī, her consort is Chakrasaṃvara (Tib. Khorlo Demchog), who is often depicted symbolically as a khaṭvāṇga on her left shoulder. In this form she is also the consort of Jinasagara (Tib. Gyalwa Gyatso), the red Avalokiteśvara (Tib. Chenrezig).

Vajrayoginī is a key figure in the advanced Tibetan Buddhist practice of Chöd, where she appears in her Kālikā (Standard Tibetan: Khros ma nag mo) or Vajravārāhī (Tibetan:rDo rje phag mo) forms.

Vajrayoginī also appears in versions of Guru yoga in the Kagyu school of Tibetan Buddhism. In one popular system the practitioner worships their guru in the form of Milarepa, whilst visualizing themself as Vajrayoginī.

The purpose of visualizing Vajrayoginī is to gain realizations of generation stage tantra, in which the practitioner mentally visualises themself as their yidam or meditational deity and their surroundings as the Deity's maṇḍala. The purpose of generation stage is to overcome ordinary appearances and ordinary conceptions, which are said in Vajrayana Buddhism to be the obstructions to liberation (Skt. nirvāṇa) and enlightenment.

== Vajrayogini temples ==
In the Kathmandu valley of Nepal there are several important Newar temples dedicated to different forms of Vajrayogini. These temples are important power places of Nepalese Vajrayana Buddhism and are also important pilgrimage places for Tibetan Buddhists. These temples include the Sankhu Vajrayogini temple, Vidhyeshvari Vajrayogini temple, Parping Vajrayogini temple, and the Guhyeshwari temple.

== Emanations ==
=== Samding Dorje Phagmo ===
The female tulku who was the abbess of Samding Monastery, on the shores of the Yamdrok Tso Lake, near Gyantse, Tibet was traditionally a nirmāṇakāya emanation of Vajravārāhī (Tibetan: Dorje Phagmo). The lineage started in the 15th century with the princess of Gungthang, Chökyi Drönma (Wylie: Chos-kyi sgron-me)(1422–1455). She became known as Samding Dorje Pagmo (Wylie:bSam-lding rDo-rje phag-mo) and began a line of female tulkus, reincarnate lamas. Charles Alfred Bell met the tulku in 1920 and took photographs of her, calling her Dorje Pamo in his book. The current incarnation, the 12th of this line, resides in Lhasa.

== See also ==
- Dorje Pakmo
- Machig Labdrön
- Mandarava
- Narodakini
- Prajnaparamita
- Simhamukha
- Yeshe Tsogyal
