= Sheshnarayan Temple =

Hindu temple in Nepal

- शेषनारायण शेषनारायण मन्दिर
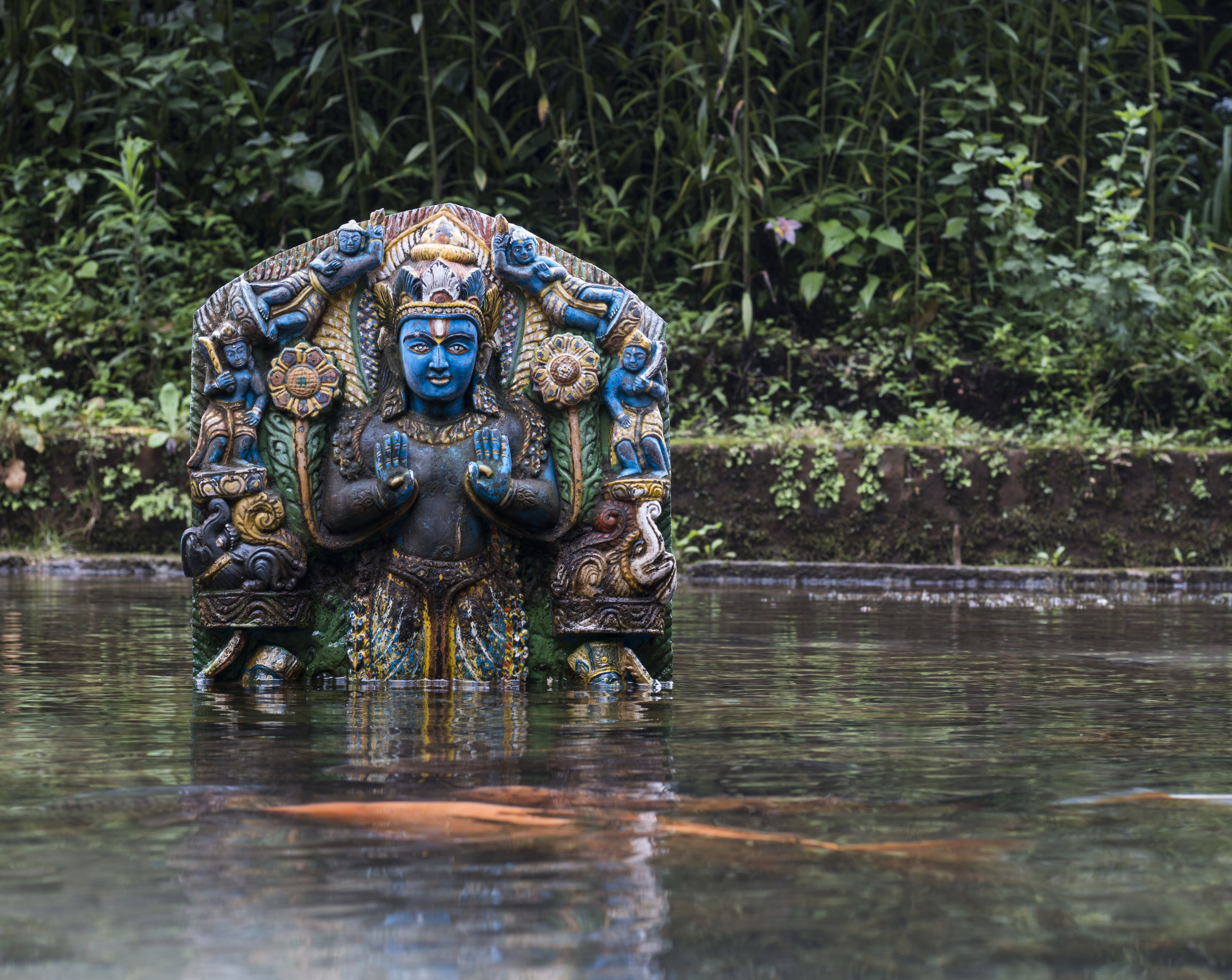
- Vishnu image in a pond at the temple.

- Location in Kathmandu

Religion
- Affiliation: Hinduism
- District: Kathmandu
- Deity: Vishnu

Location
- Country: Nepal
- Coordinates: 27.63°N 85.27°E

Architecture
- Type: Pagoda

Sheshnarayan Temple is a Hindu temple complex in Sheshnarayan Village Development Committee (VDC). The site is near the town of Pharping, approximately 20 kilometers south-west of Kathmandu, Nepal.
