= Dakshinkali =

Dakshinkali Municipality दक्षिणकाली नगरपालिका
- Municipality
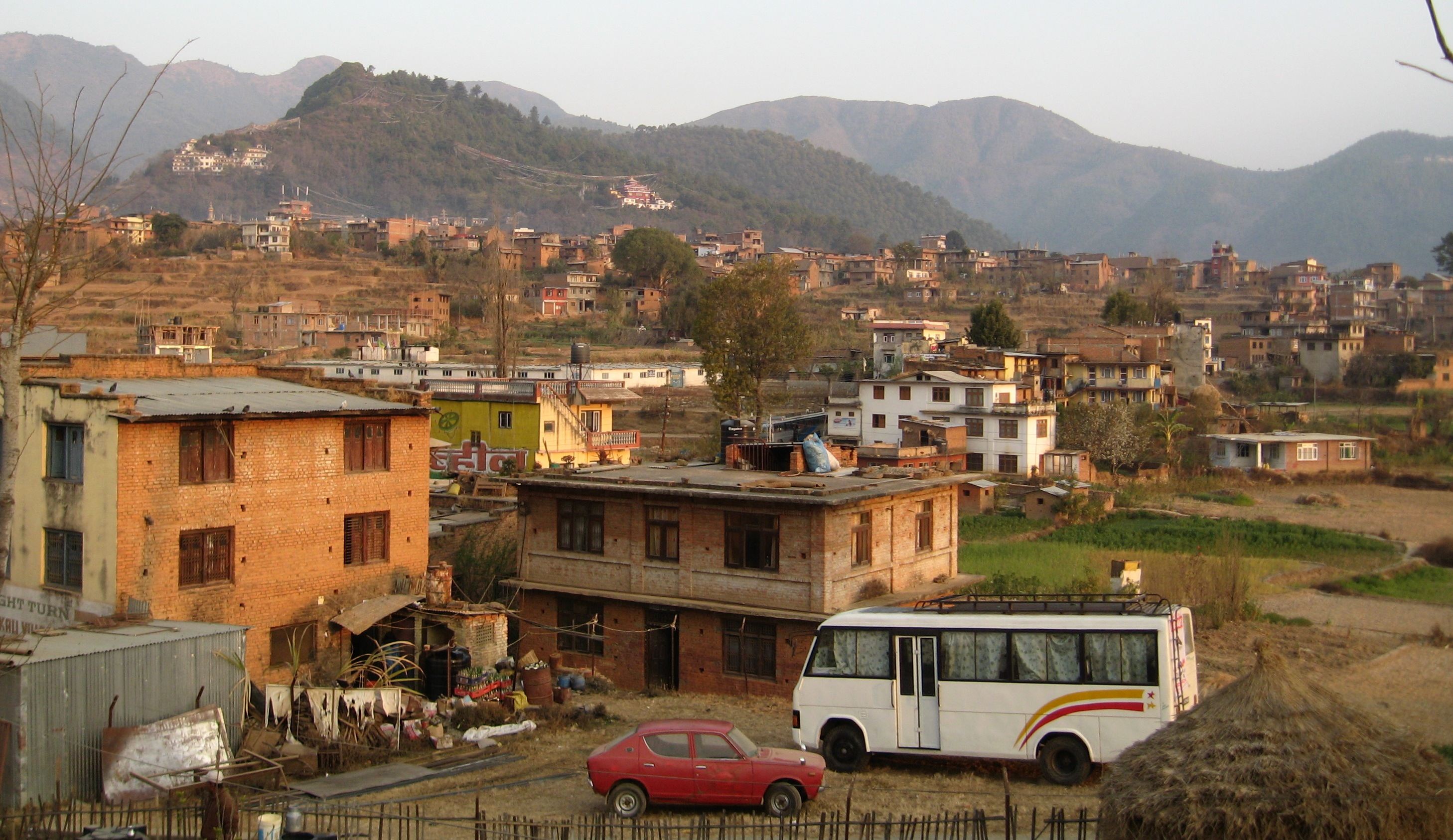
- Dakshinkali in 2009

- Location in Nepal Dakshinkali Municipality (Nepal)
- Coordinates: 27°35′0″N 85°15′0″E
- Country: Nepal
- Province: Bagmati
- District: Kathmandu
- Established: December 2, 2014
- Named for: Dakshinkali Temple

Government
  - Mayor: Mohan Basnet (NC)
  - Deputy Mayor: Basanti Tamang (Dangol) (NC)

Area
  - Total: 42.6 km^{2} (16.4 sq mi)

Population (2021 Nepal census)
  - Total: 26,372
  - Density: 619/km^{2} (1,600/sq mi)
  - Ethnicities: Newar Bahun Chhetri Tamang Magar
- Time zone: UTC+5:45 (NST)
- Website: www.daxinkalimun.gov.np/en

Dakshinkali is a municipality in Kathmandu District in the Province No. 3 of Nepal that was established on 2 December 2014 by merging the former Village development committees Chalnakhel, Chhaimale, Sheshnarayan, Sokhel, Talku Dudechaur and Old-Dakshinkali. The municipality's name means 'Southern Kali' and refers to a several centuries old temple complex that lies in the vicinity.

== Toponymy ==
=== Language origin ===
- Language family: Indoeuropean
- Language: Sanskrit

=== Etymology ===
“Dakshin” means south or the southern direction. “Kali” refers to the Hindu goddess Kali. Therefore, Dakshinkali is interpreted as “the temple/place of the goddess Kali in the south.”

Dakshin (दक्षिण) means “south, southern” and comes from Sanskrit दक्षिण (dakṣiṇa) meaning “south” or “right-hand side.” Kali (काली) is a Hindu goddess, from Sanskrit काली (Kālī) meaning “the black one, the dark goddess,” feminine of काल (kāla) meaning time, blackness, death. The toponym Dakshinkali is a compound Sanskrit name indicating a sacred site dedicated to the goddess Kali, located in the southern direction of the valley.

== Population ==
Dakshinkali municipality has a total population of 24,297 according to 2011 Nepal census. The population grew to 26,372 at the 2021 Nepal census. Around 99.3% of the residents are Nepali citizens and 80% are literate.

Dakshinkali municipality

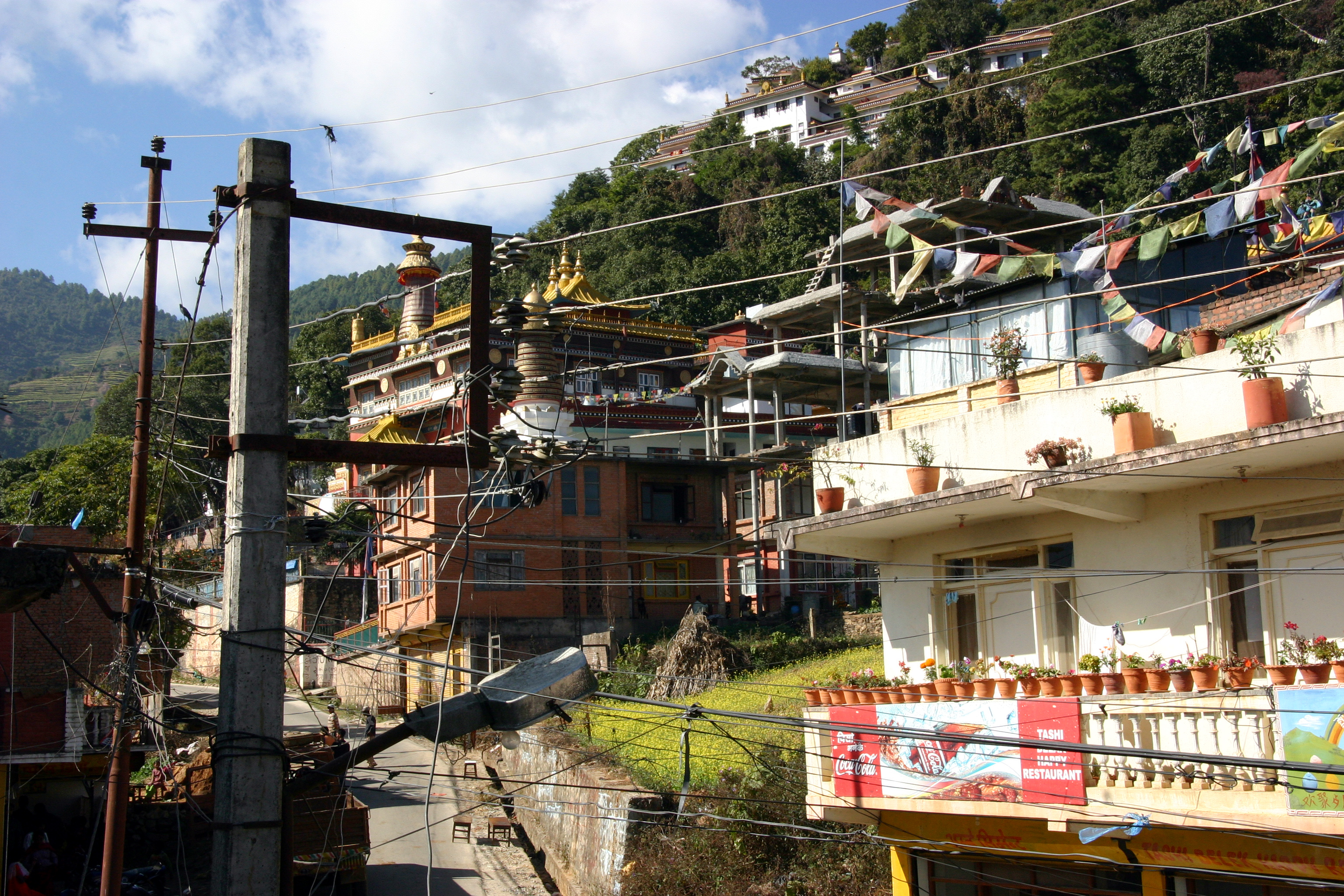
Pharping

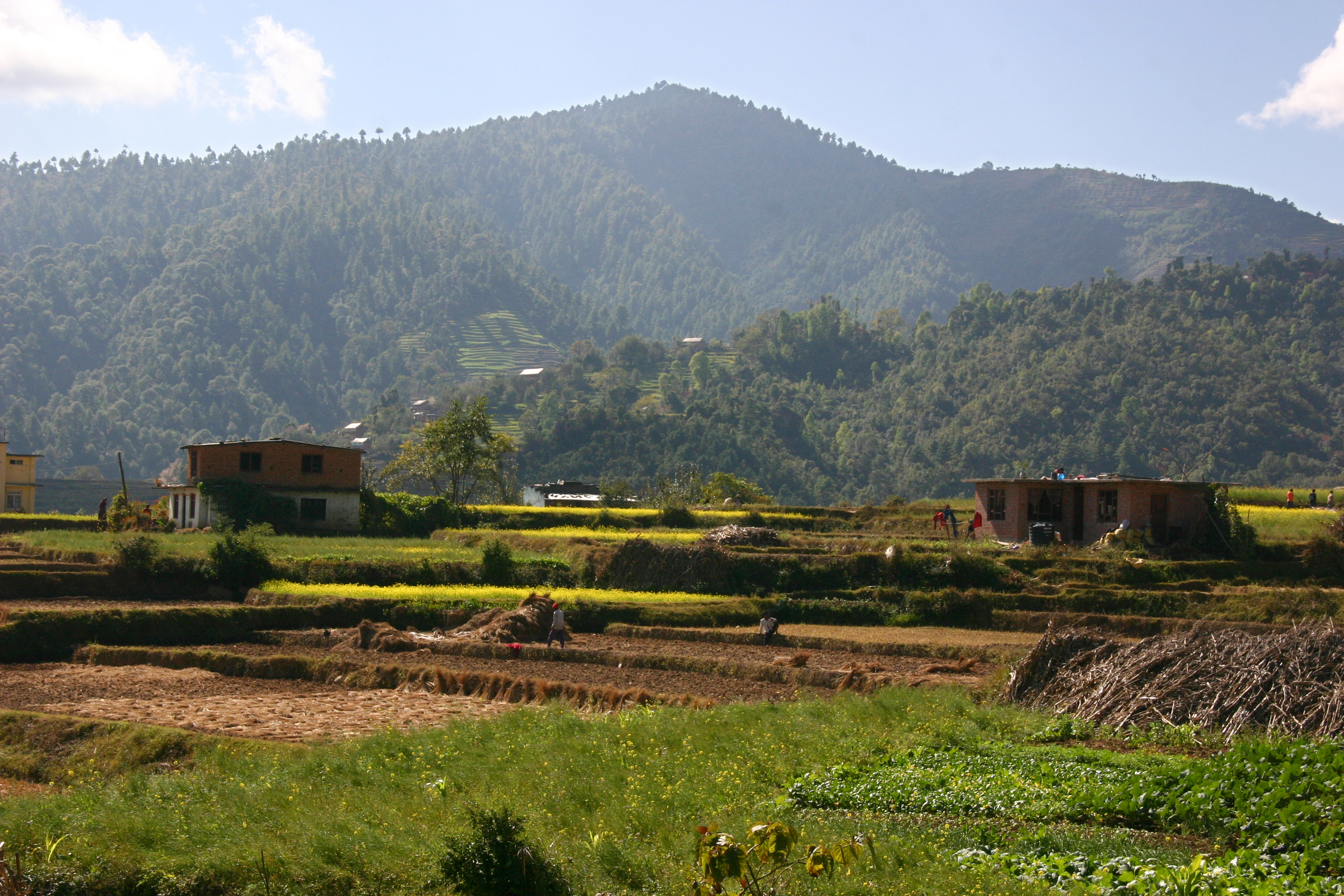
Fields

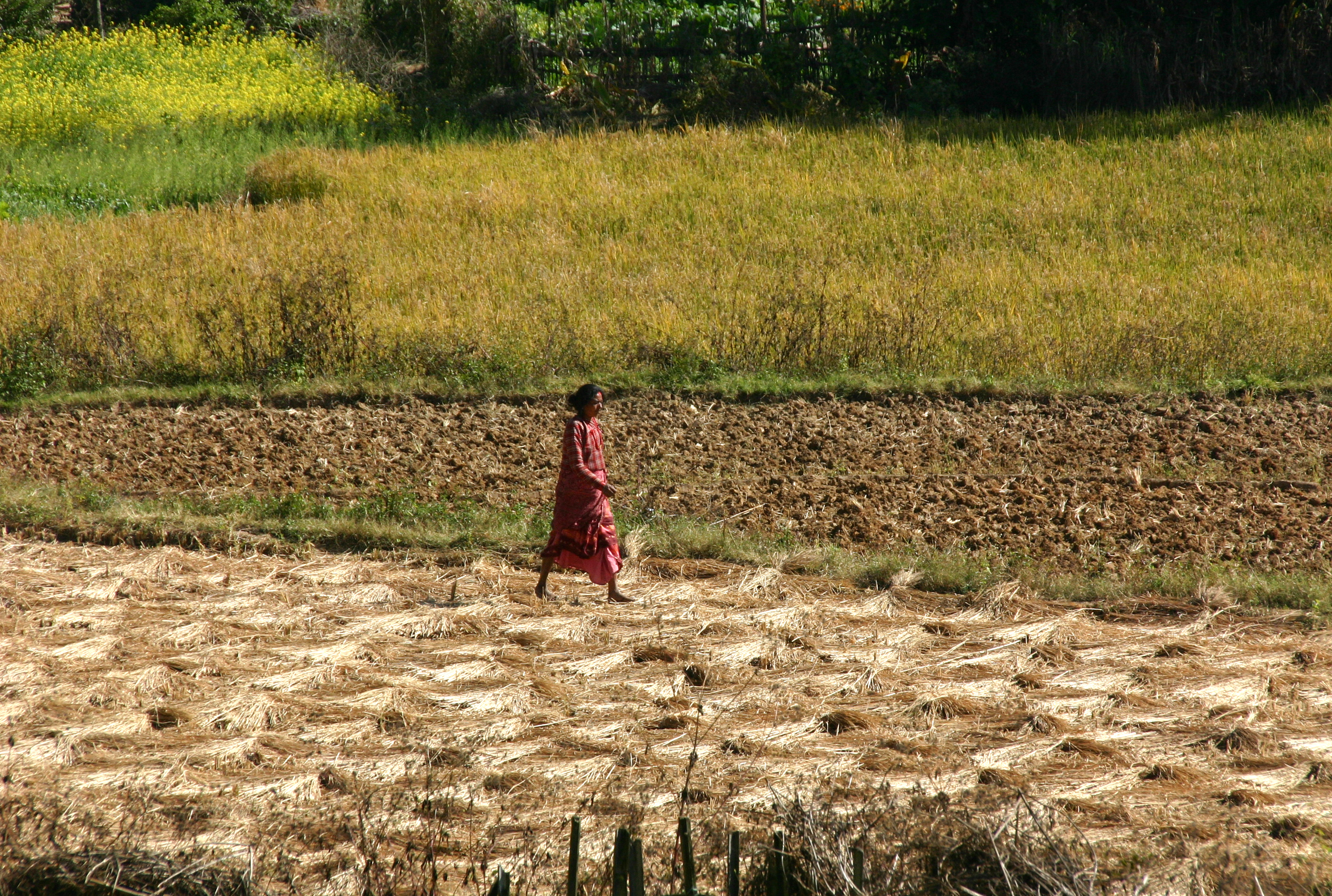
Grain harvest

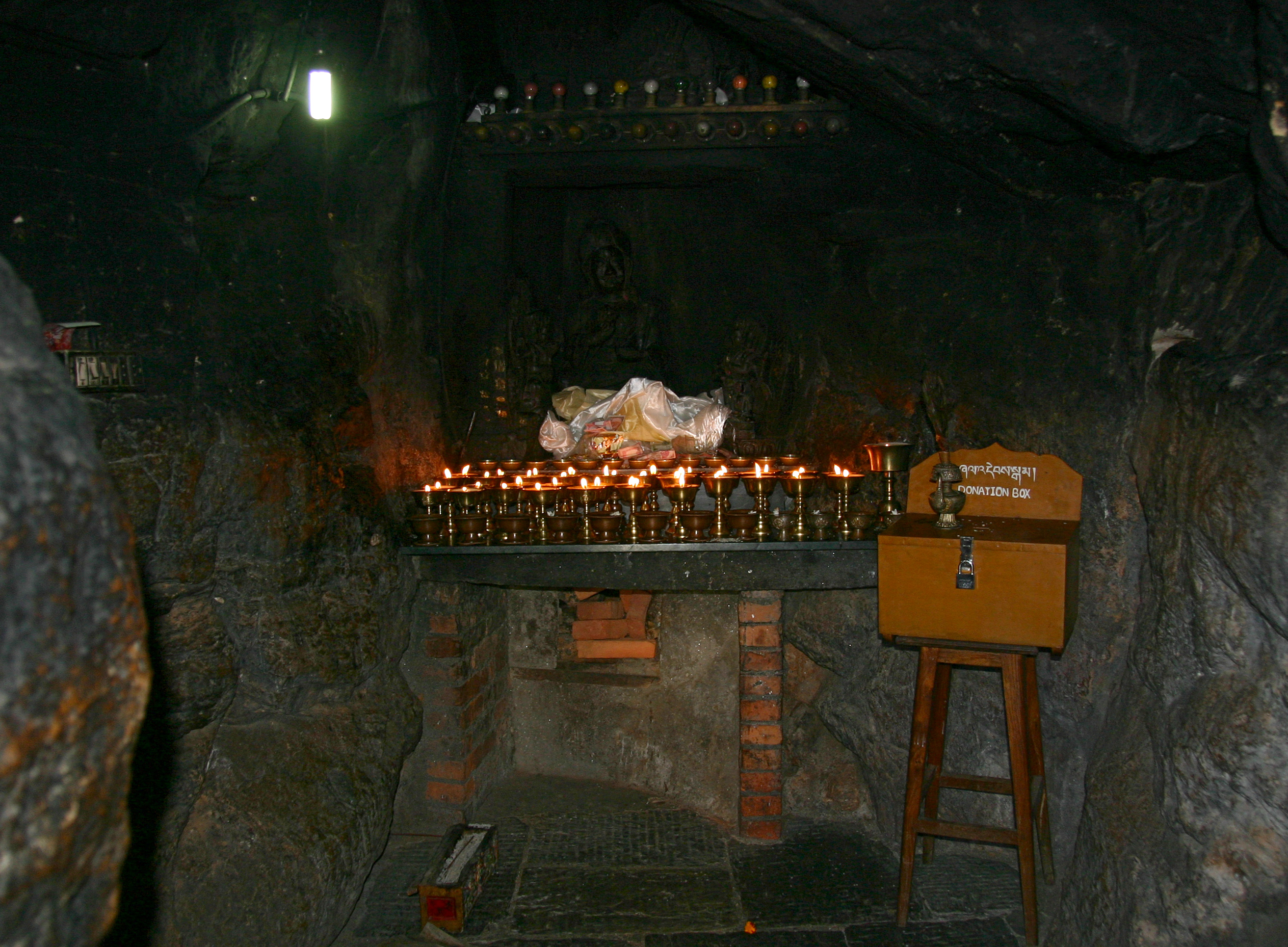
Cave of Goraknath

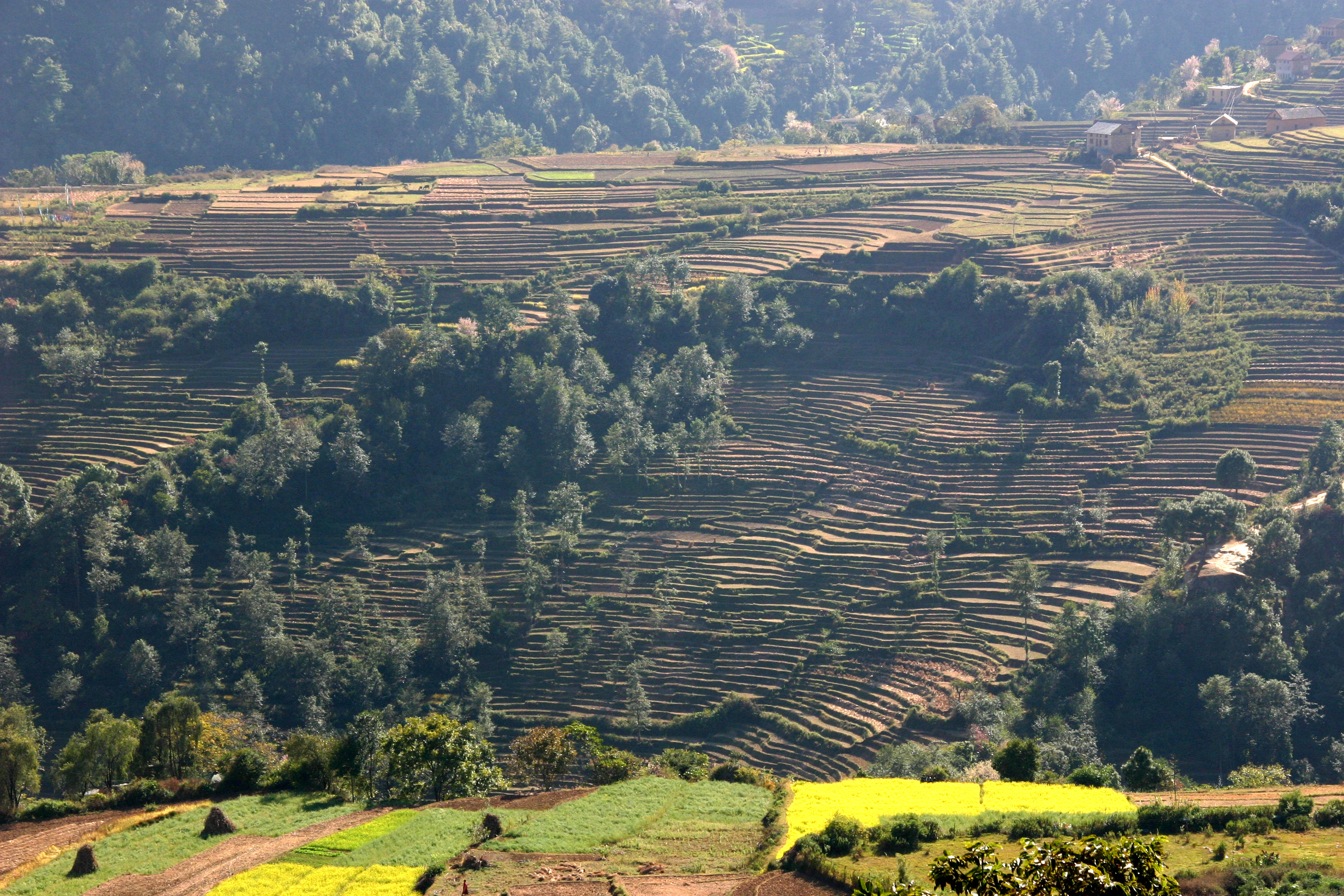
Rice terraces

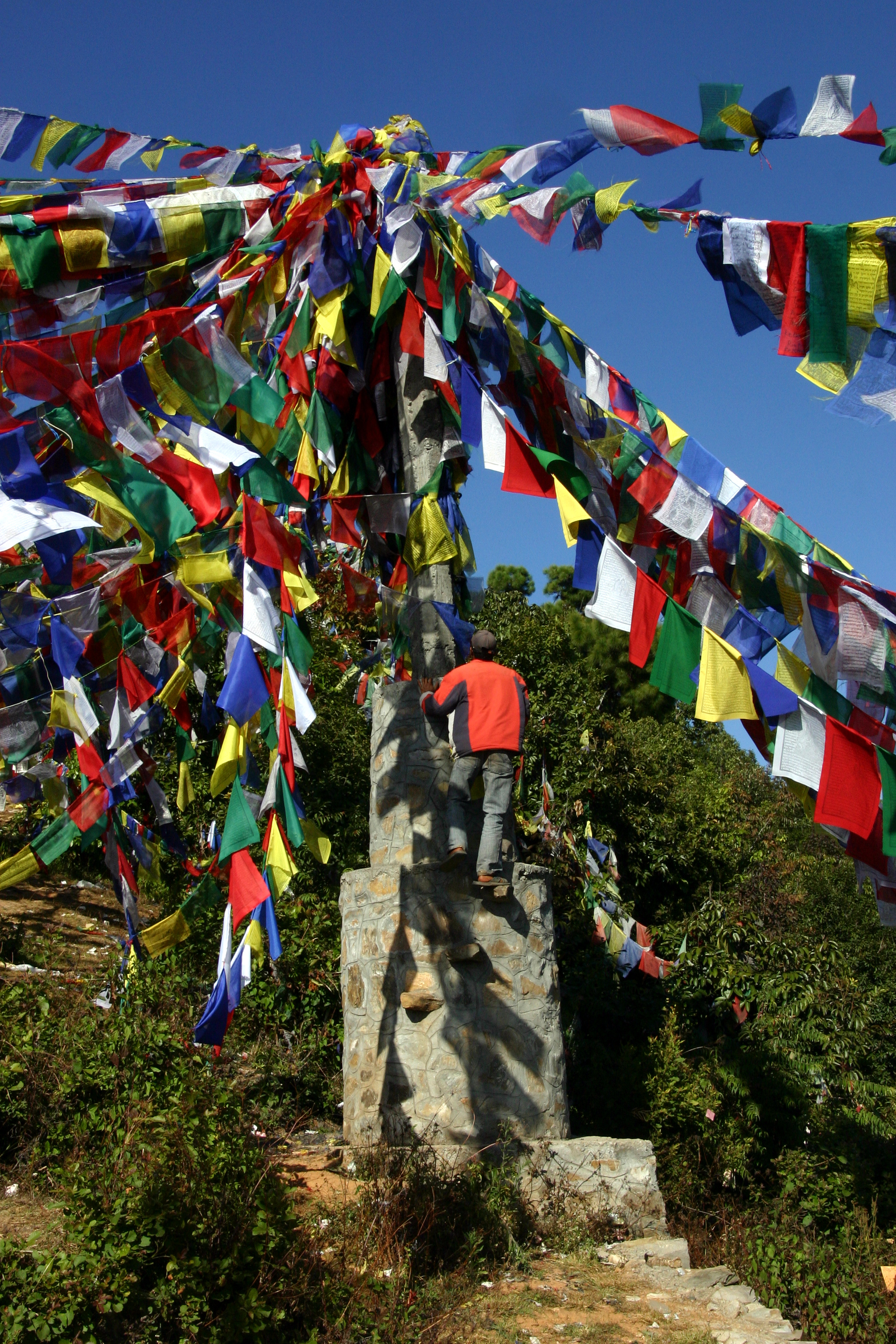
Prayer flags

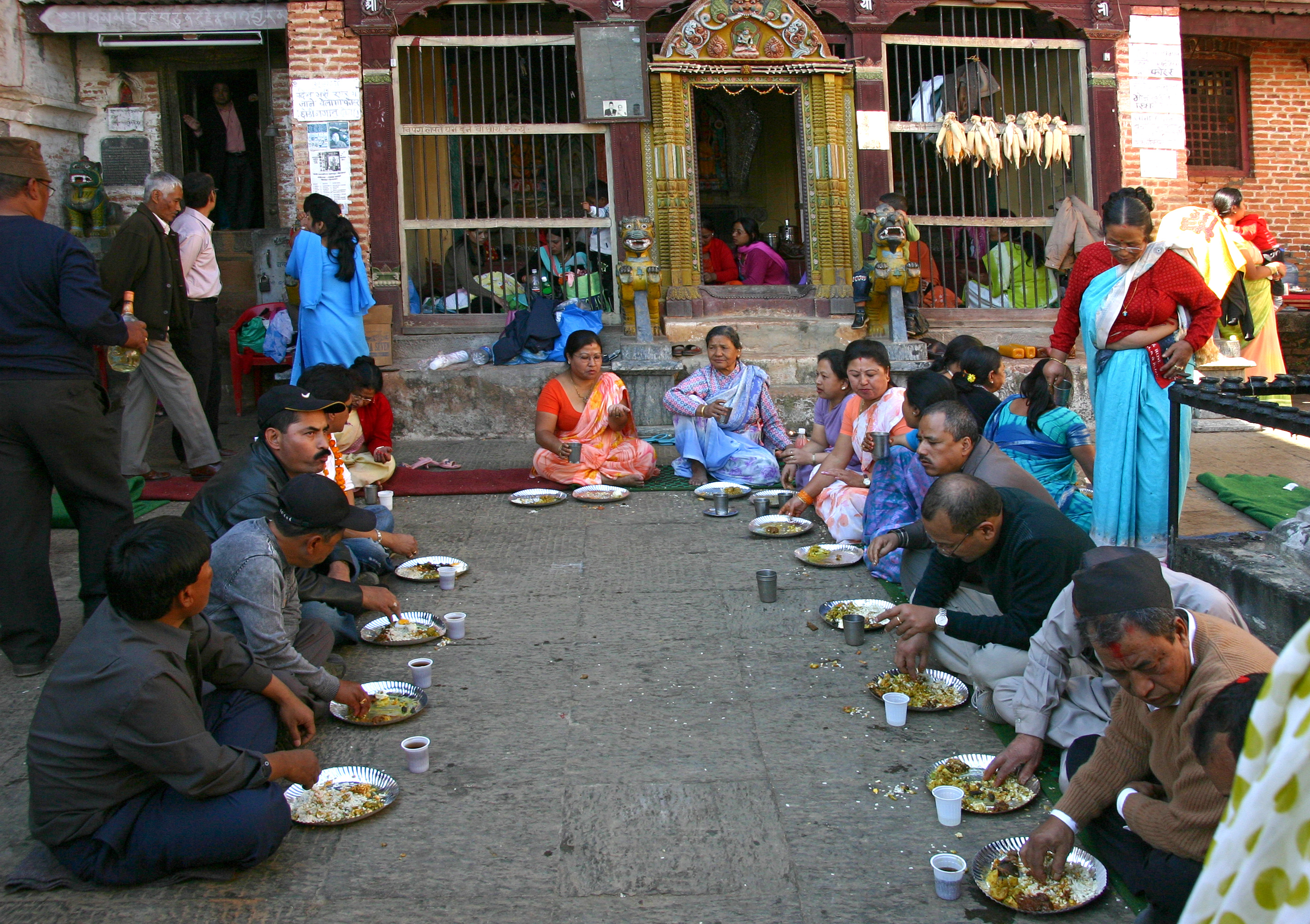
Monastery of Vajrayogini

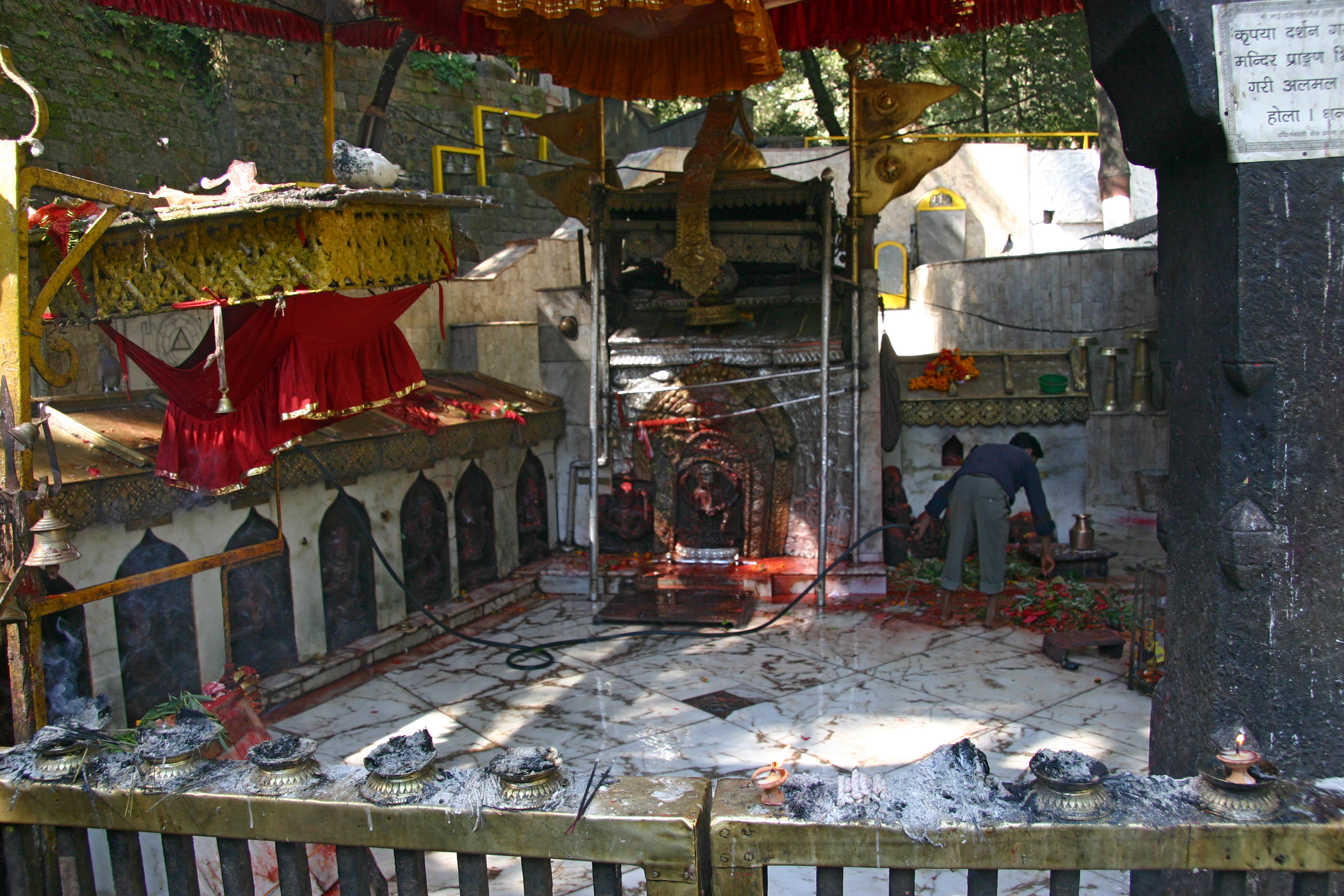
Dakshinkali temple

== See also ==
- Dakshinkali Temple
