= Guhyeshwari Temple =

Hindu temple in Kathmandu, Nepal

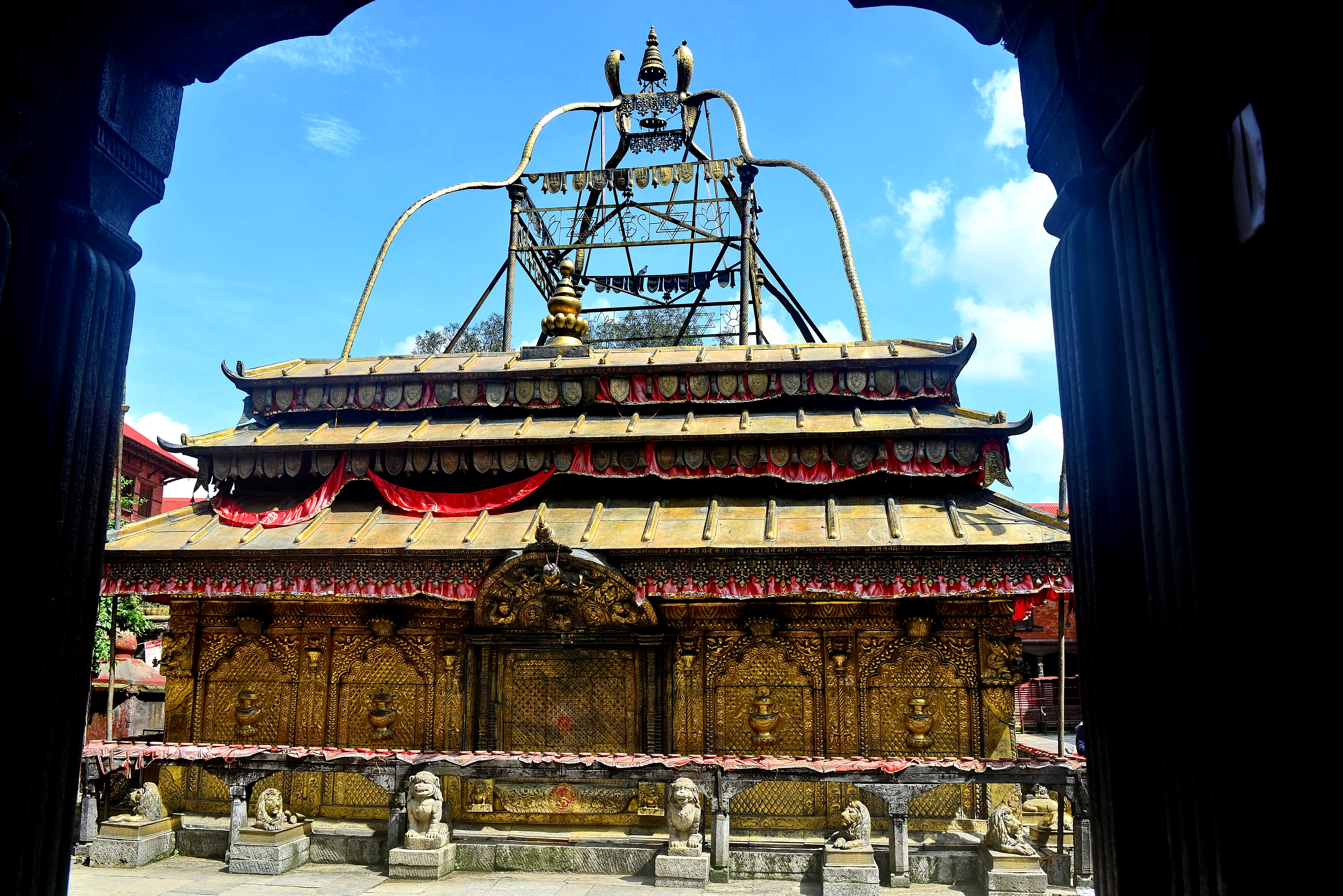

- Location in Kathmandu

Religion
- Affiliation: Hinduism
- District: Kathmandu
- Deity: Guhyakali
- Festivals: Mohani; Dashain; Navaratri; Guhyeshwari Jatra

Location
- Location: Kathmandu
- Country: Nepal
- Coordinates: 27°42′40″N 85°21′12″E

Architecture
- Type: Newar Architecture
- Inscriptions: Inscription of Pratap Malla

Website

Protected Ancient Monument
- Law: Ancient Monuments Preservation Act, 2013 (1956)
- ID: NP-KMC08-02

Guhyeshwari Temple (Nepali: गुह्येश्वरी मन्दिर), also spelled Guheswari or Gujeshwari, is a Hindu temple in Kathmandu, Nepal. The temple is a Shakta pitha and is about 1 km east of Pashupati Kshetra and is located on the southern bank of the Bagmati River. It is an important pilgrimage destination especially for Tantric worshipers. King Pratap Malla renovated this temple in the 17th century.

The Devi Bhagavata Purana mentions this temple in its list of sacred places of Adishakti and refers to the deity of Nepal as Guhyakali.

गुह्यकाल्या महास्थानं नेपाले यत्प्रतिष्ठितम्।

The great abode of Śrī Guhya Kālī is established in Nepal

— Devī Bhāgavatam 7th Canto, Chapter 38, Verse 11

The temple's name originates from the Sanskrit words Guhya (secret or hidden) and Ishwari (goddess). The Guhyeshwari Temple marks the spot where Sati's anus and rectum are said to have fallen.

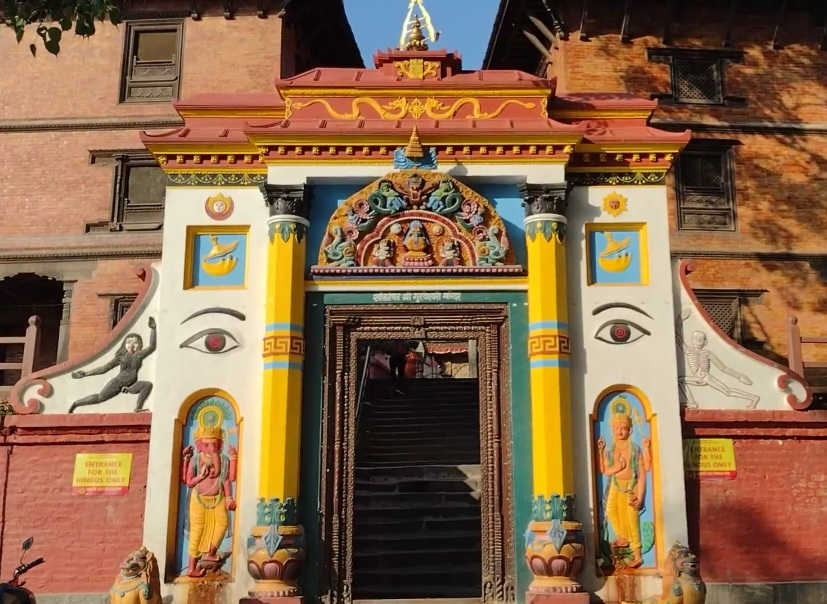
Main gate of Guhyeshwari Temple

The daily rituals (nitya pūjā) at the Guhyeśvarī Temple are performed by a priestly clan from the Newar community, in accordance with the Sarvamnaya Tantra. The temple's regular tantric rites are conducted by the Karmacharya, who are the traditional Kaula priests. On special occasions and during major ceremonies, Rajopadhyaya Brahmins, who are both Vedic and Kaula priests, perform the Vedic rituals, while the Karmacharya continues to officiate the tantric rites.

== Legend ==
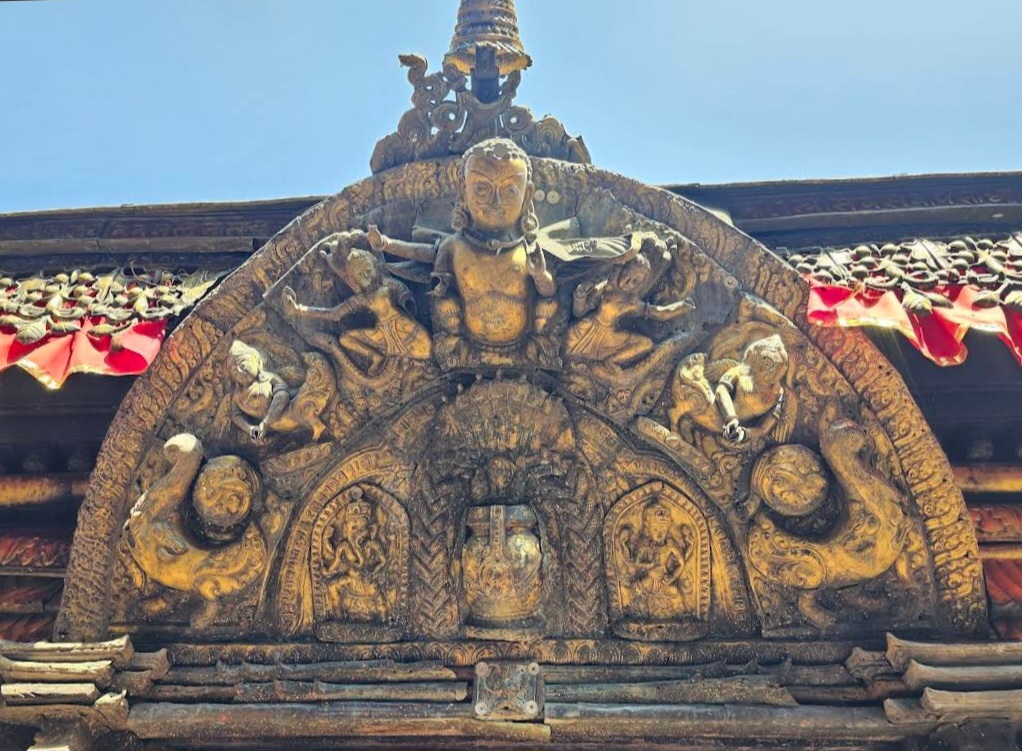
Torana of Guhyeshwari Temple

According to the Meru Tantra and the Himavatkhanda of the Skanda Purana, the Guhyeshwari temple is the place where Sati's anus and rectum fell. The same account is also found in the Devamala Vamshavali, Bhasa Vamshavali and Svasthani Vratakatha.

These texts refer to this temple as the place where Sati’s guhya or guda fell, and refers the deity by various names such as Guhyakālī, Guhyeśī, Guhyeśvarī, Guhyakeśvarī, and Guhyakālikā. The consort of Guhyeshwari is mentioned as Pashupati in the Manthanbhairava Tantra.

The Varahi Tantra, ignores which part of Sati’s body part fell. It mentions "Nepāla Guhyamaṇḍalaṃ" lit. 'The Guhya Mandala of Nepal' being 1 crore time merit bestowing than other places and states that there is no Shaktipeetha greater than Guhyeshwari.

The Guhyeshwari temple should not be confused with the Shaktipeetha mentioned in the Peethanirnaya from Tantra Chudamani, where Sati's both knees are said to have fallen in Nepal and the presiding deity is Mahamaya. According to the Nepal Mahatmya 11.107 and 1.38, Sati's both knees fell near the confluence of the Vishnumati and Bagmati rivers, where the presiding deity is Mahamaya, while the Anus fell near the Bagmati river close to the Mrigasthali of the Pashupati temple, and the deity is Guhyeshwari or Guhyakali.

The Tripura Rahasya's Mahatmya Khanda lists 12 places where Goddess Lalita always resides and refers to her form in Nepal as Guhyakeshvari (Tripura Rahasya 1.48.74: Nepāle Guhyakeśvarī). In Lalitha Sahasranama the 707th name of the Goddess is mentioned as "Guhyarupini" (Lalita Sahasranama 137th verse: Sarasvatī śāstramayī, Guhāmbā guhyarūpiṇī). The 51 Shakta pithas also correspond to 51 letters of the Sanskrit alphabet, Guhyeshwari represent I letter. This temple is revered by Tantric practitioners, and Tantric rites are performed in this temple. The temple gets very crowded during Navaratri and Jatras.

== Vajrayana Buddhism ==
Vajrayana Buddhists consider Guhyeshwari to be sacred to Vajrayogini in the form of Vajravarahi and to be the location of root of the mythical lotus upon which Swayambhunath stupa rests, which is also the umbilical cord that nurtures Kathmandu. In Tibetan language, the place is called Pag-mo Ngal-chu (Varahi's womb fluid). The water which flows from the spring in the well of the temple is believed to be vaginal discharge, likely amniotic fluid, or waters of Vajravarahi.
