= Amazing Race Suomi season 1 =

Amazing Race Suomi
- Season 1
- Presented by: Heikki Paasonen
- No. of days: 24
- No. of teams: 12
- Winners: Kaisa Mäkäräinen & Mari Eder
- No. of legs: 12
- Distance traveled: 26,000 km (16,000 mi)
- No. of episodes: 12

Release
- Original network: Nelonen
- Original release: 30 September – 16 December 2023

Additional information
- Filming dates: 24 July – 16 August 2023

Series chronology
- Next → Season 2

This is the first season of Amazing Race Suomi (English: Amazing Race Finland), a Finnish reality competition show based on the American series The Amazing Race. Hosted by Heikki Paasonen, it featured twelve teams of two, each with a pre-existing relationship and including at least one celebrity contestant, competing in a race around Southeast Asia to win €30,000. This season visited two continents and seven countries and travelled over 26,000 kilometres (16,000 mi) during twelve legs. Starting in Helsinki, racers travelled through Thailand, Vietnam, the Philippines, Indonesia, Malaysia and Singapore before returning to Finland and finishing in Helsinki. The season premiered on 30 September 2023 on Nelonen and concluded on 16 December.

Friends and biathletes Kaisa Mäkäräinen and Mari Eder won this season, while father-son duo Tuukka & Sami Ritokoski finished in second place, and friends and work partners Janne Lehtonen and Robin Hendry finished in third place.

== Production ==
=== Development and filming ===
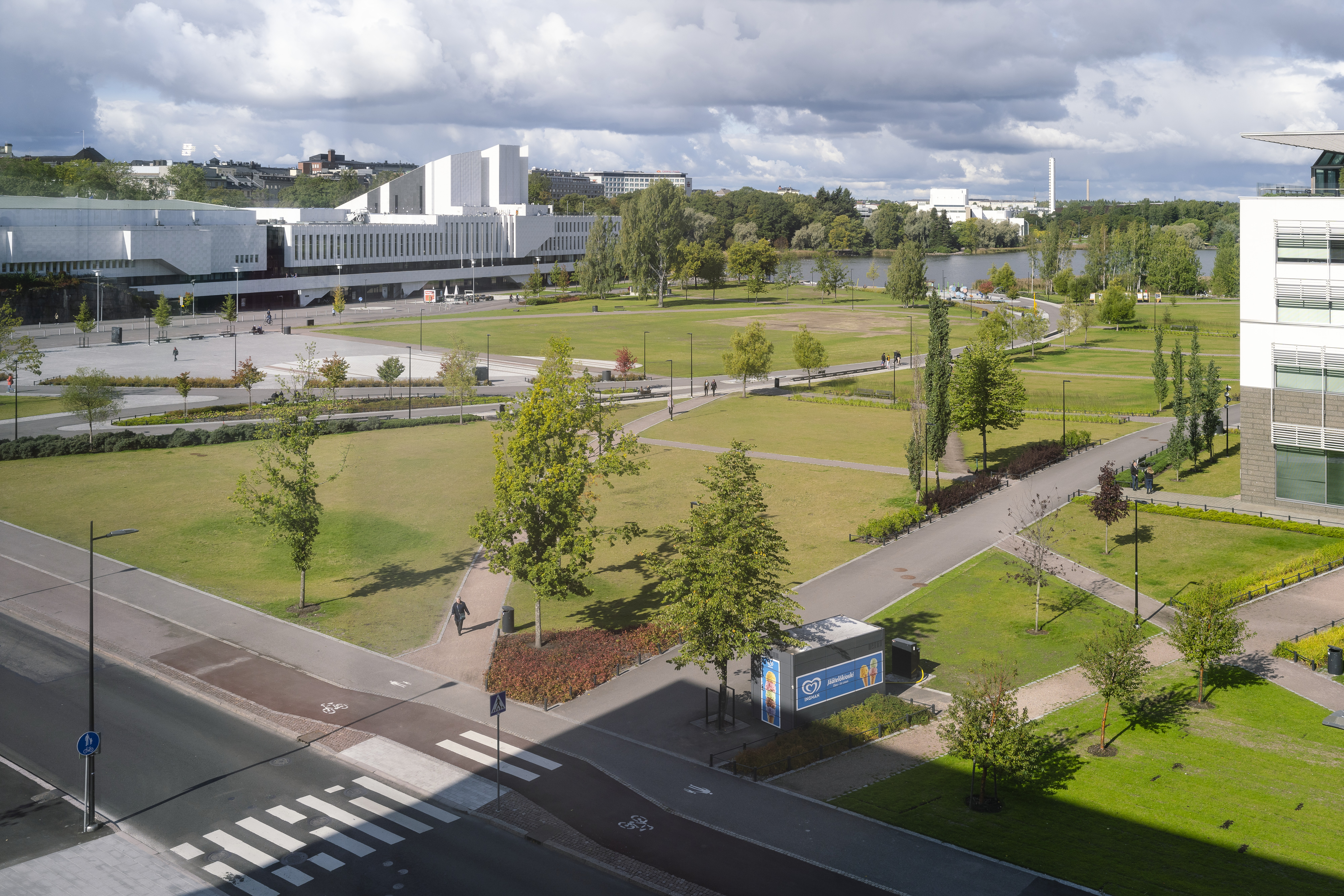
The first-ever Amazing Race Suomi began from Töölönlahti, a neighbourhood in Helsinki.

Finnish television network Nelonen held talks with Bertram van Munster and Elise Doganieri for years on how they could make The Amazing Race format in Finland. After the rights were secured, Moskito Television obtained Jesse McDonald, a producer who had travelled internationally for almost 20 years with the original show, as an executive producer.

The casting for the celebrity teams of the first season finished in early 2023. On 12 April 2023, it was announced that filming would occur during the summer with contestants traveling around the world. On 25 May 2023, it was announced that Heikki Paasonen would host the show, filming of which would start in late July. On 24 July 2023, the teams were announced as the race began from Töölönlahti. Filming lasted for roughly four weeks and concluded on 16 August 2023 back in Helsinki, Finland.

== Release ==
=== Broadcast ===
The first trailer of the first season was released on 29 August, which featured a sneak peek about the season, some tasks and locations.

=== Marketing ===
Sponsors for this season include CamelBak, Fjällräven, Free bug repellent, HAI Group, Jack Wolfskin, Makia, Rela tablets and Superdry. The participants' backpacks advert OP Pohjola, a Finnish bank service.

== Cast ==
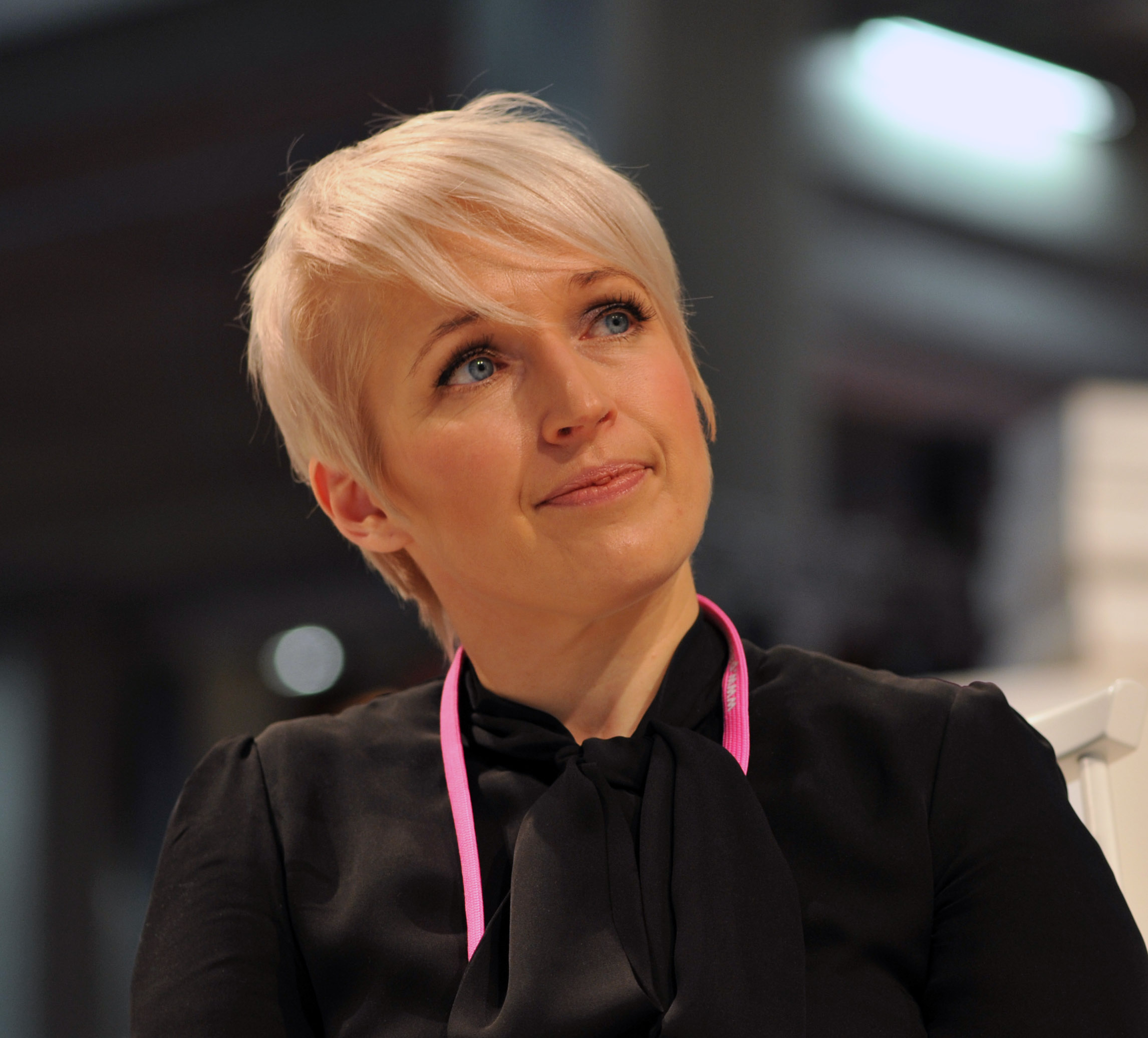
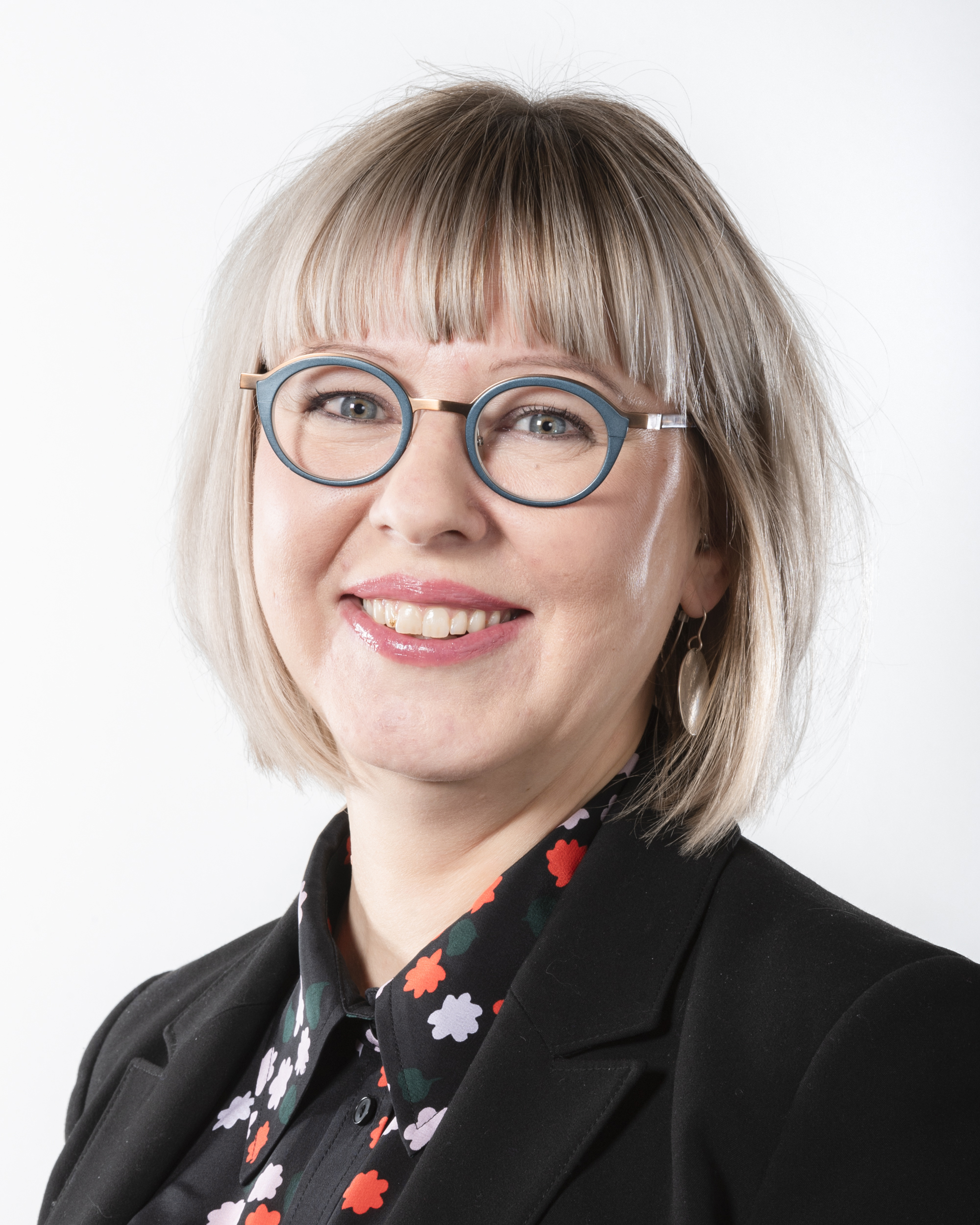
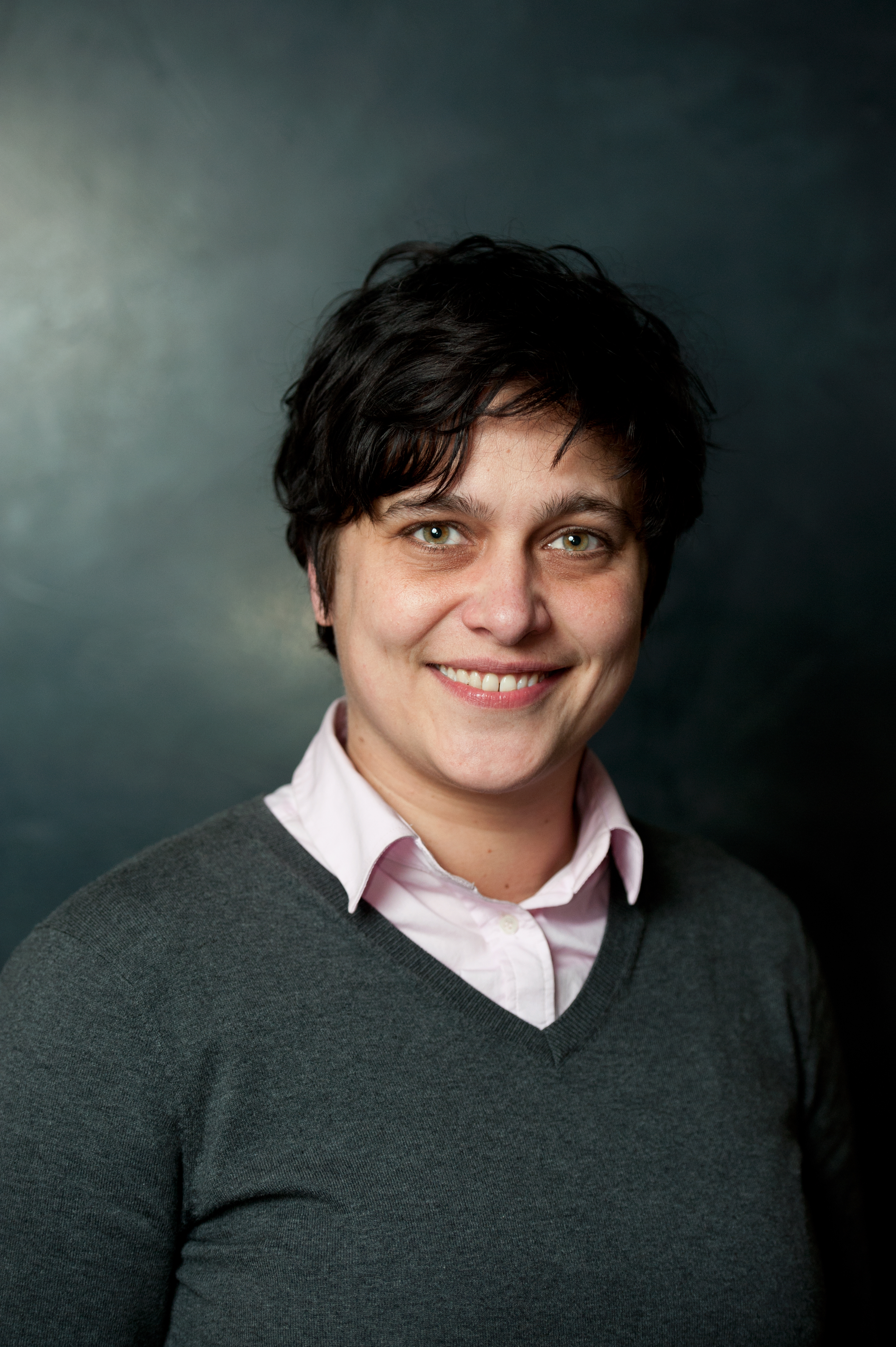
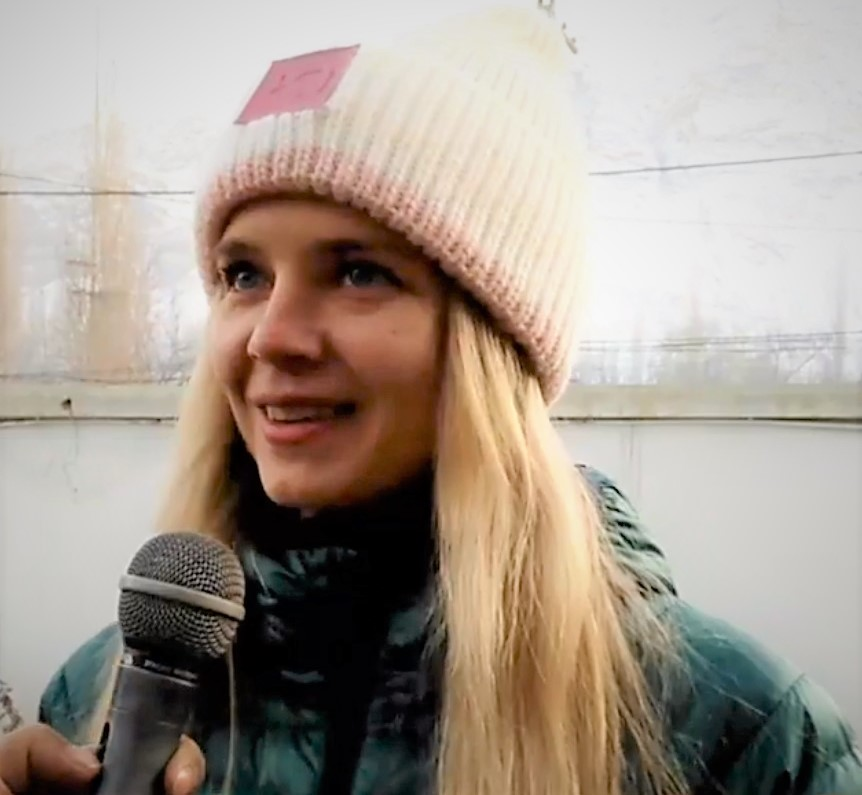
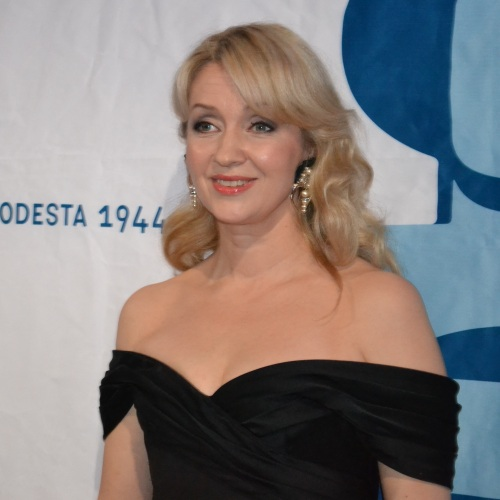
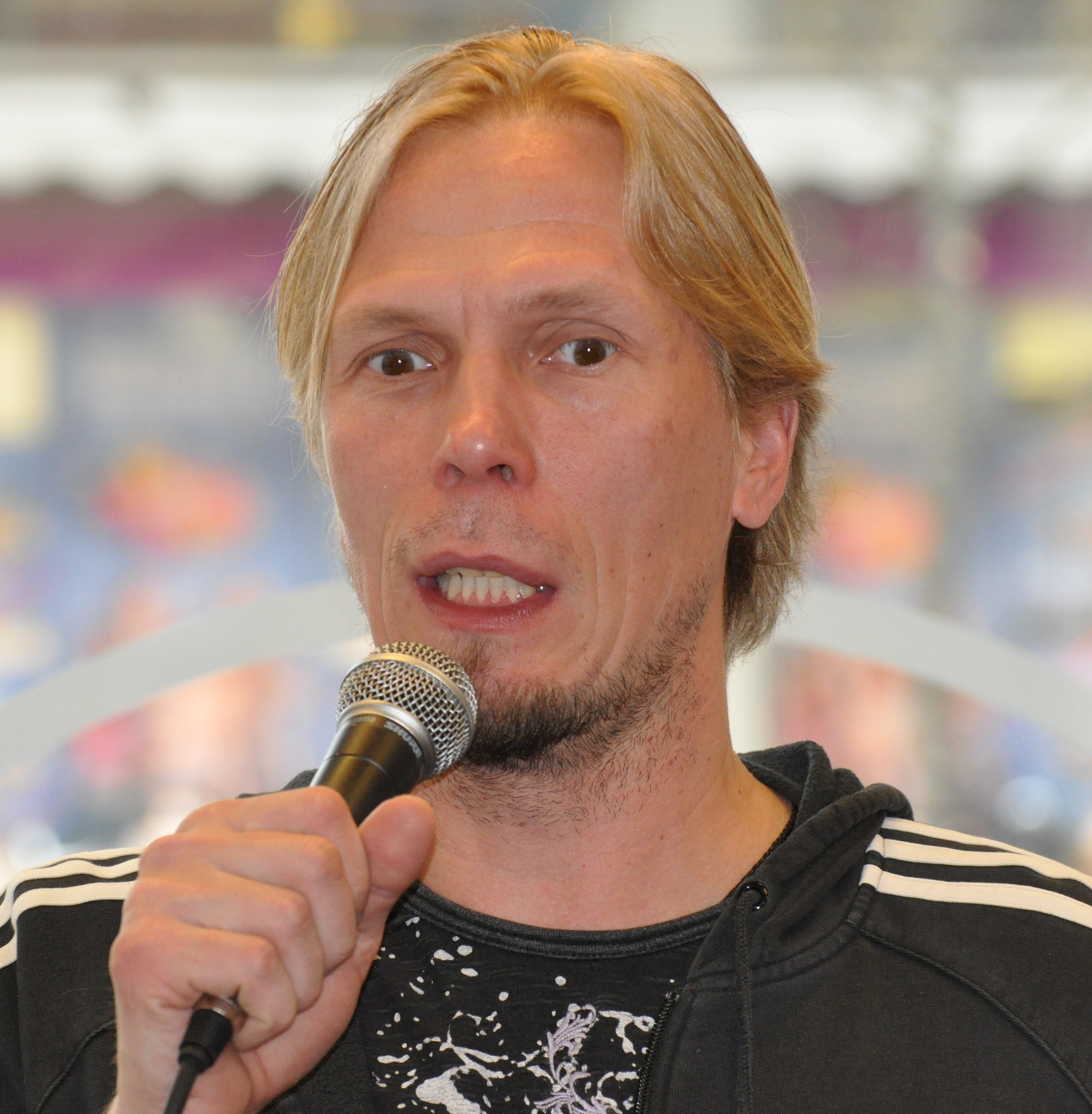
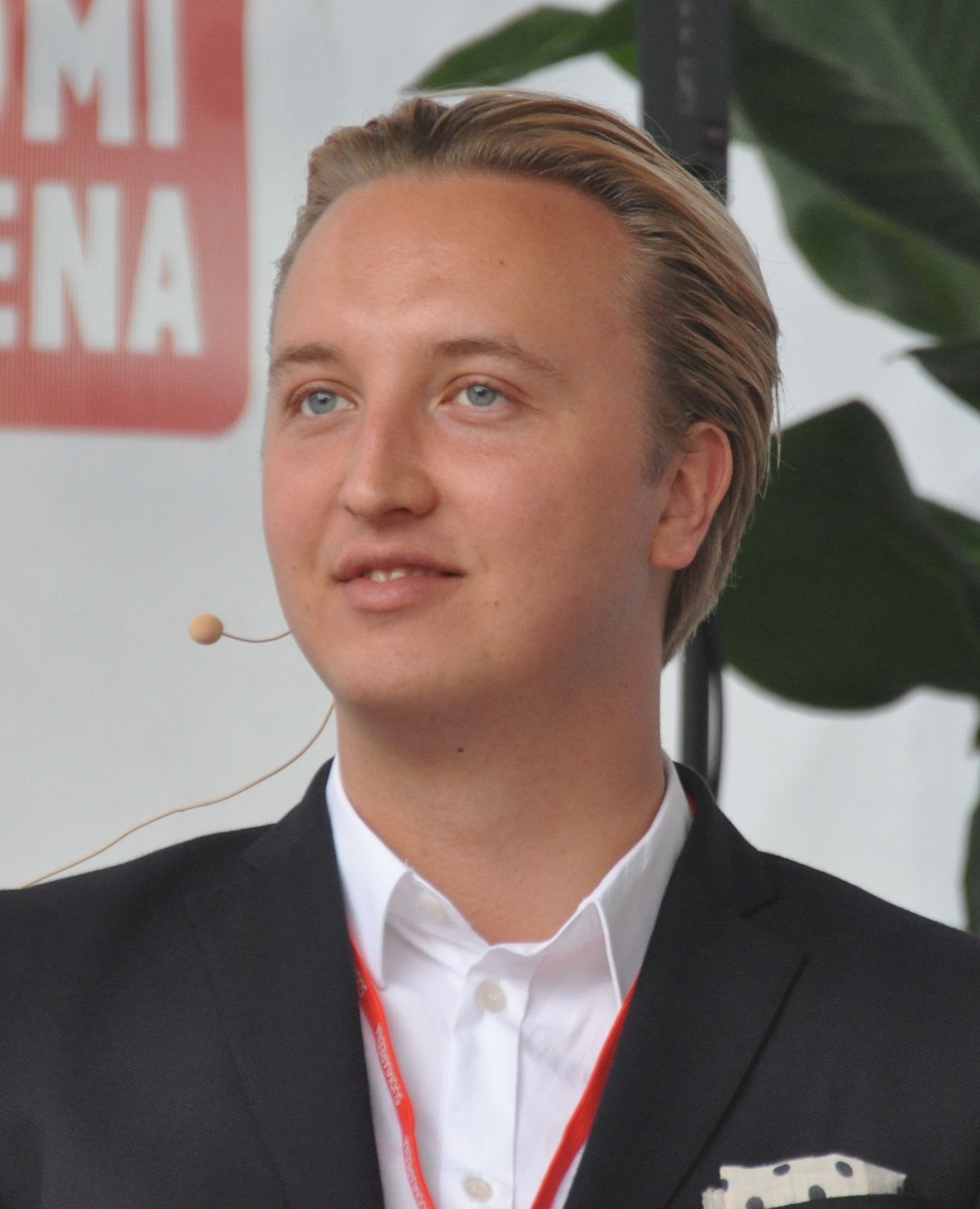
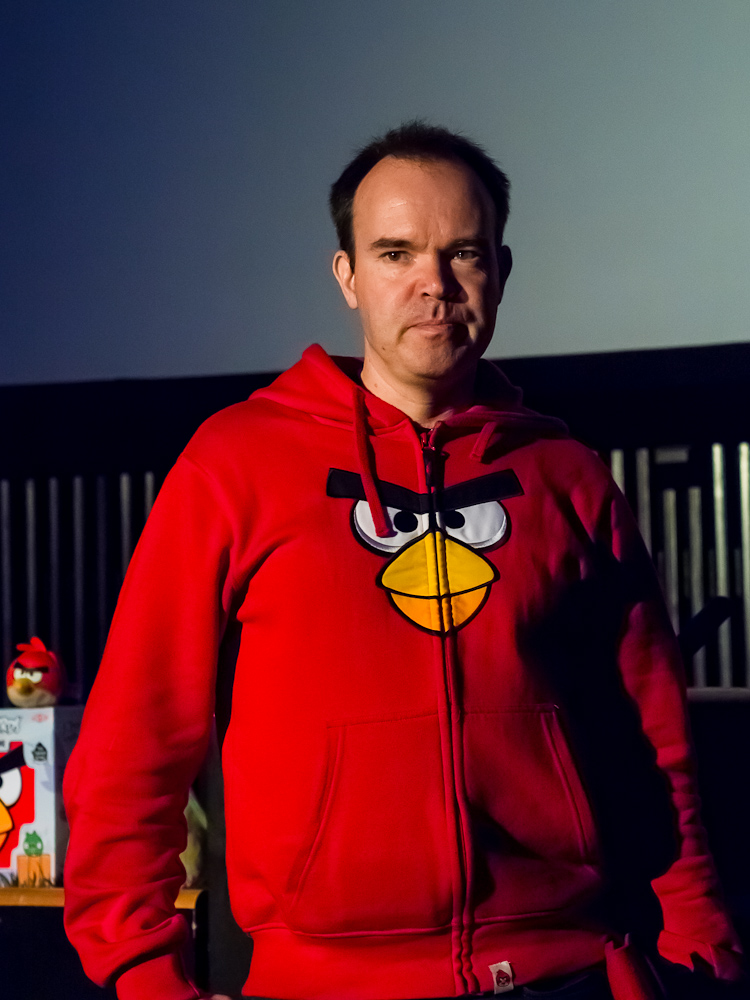
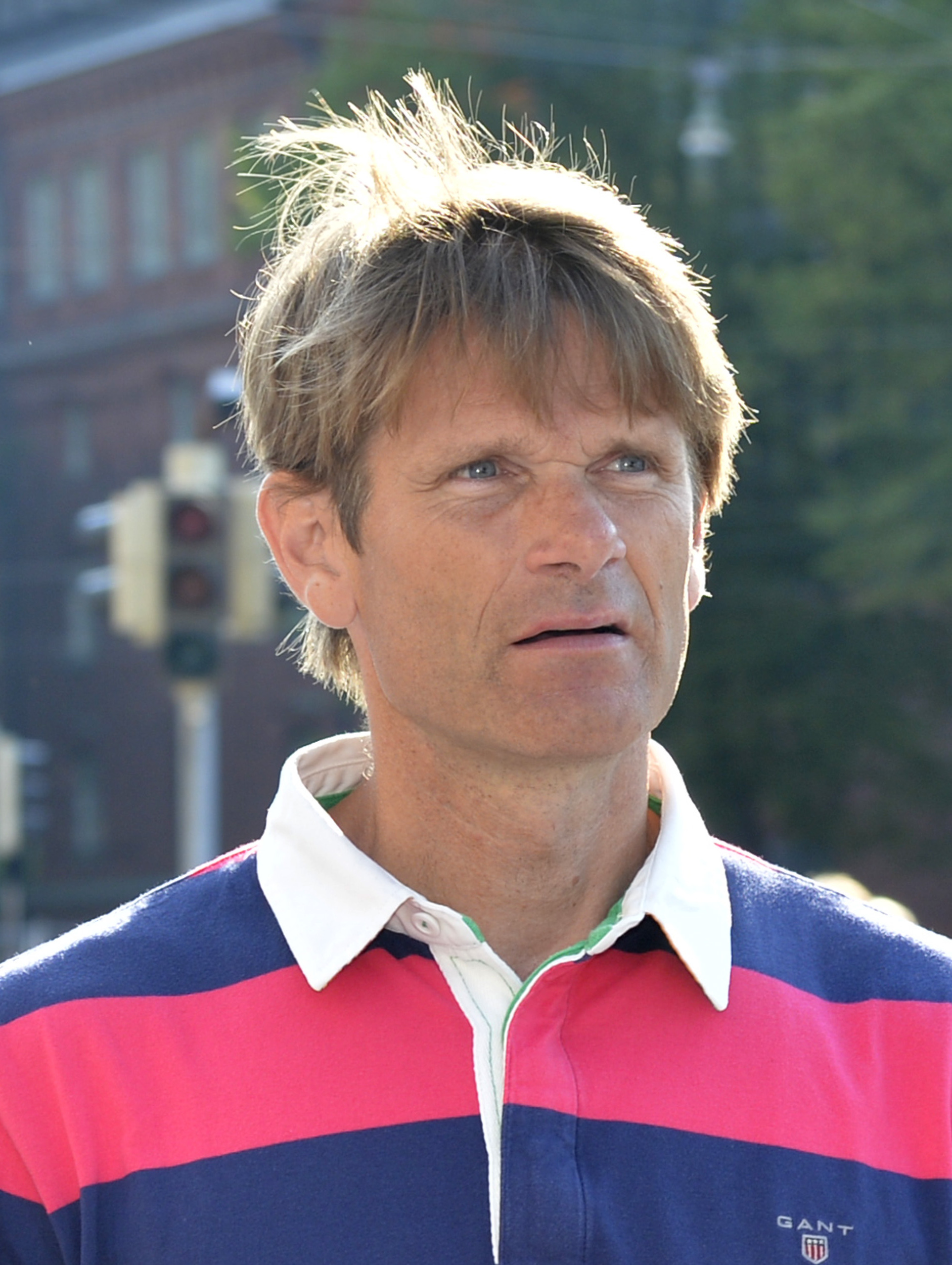
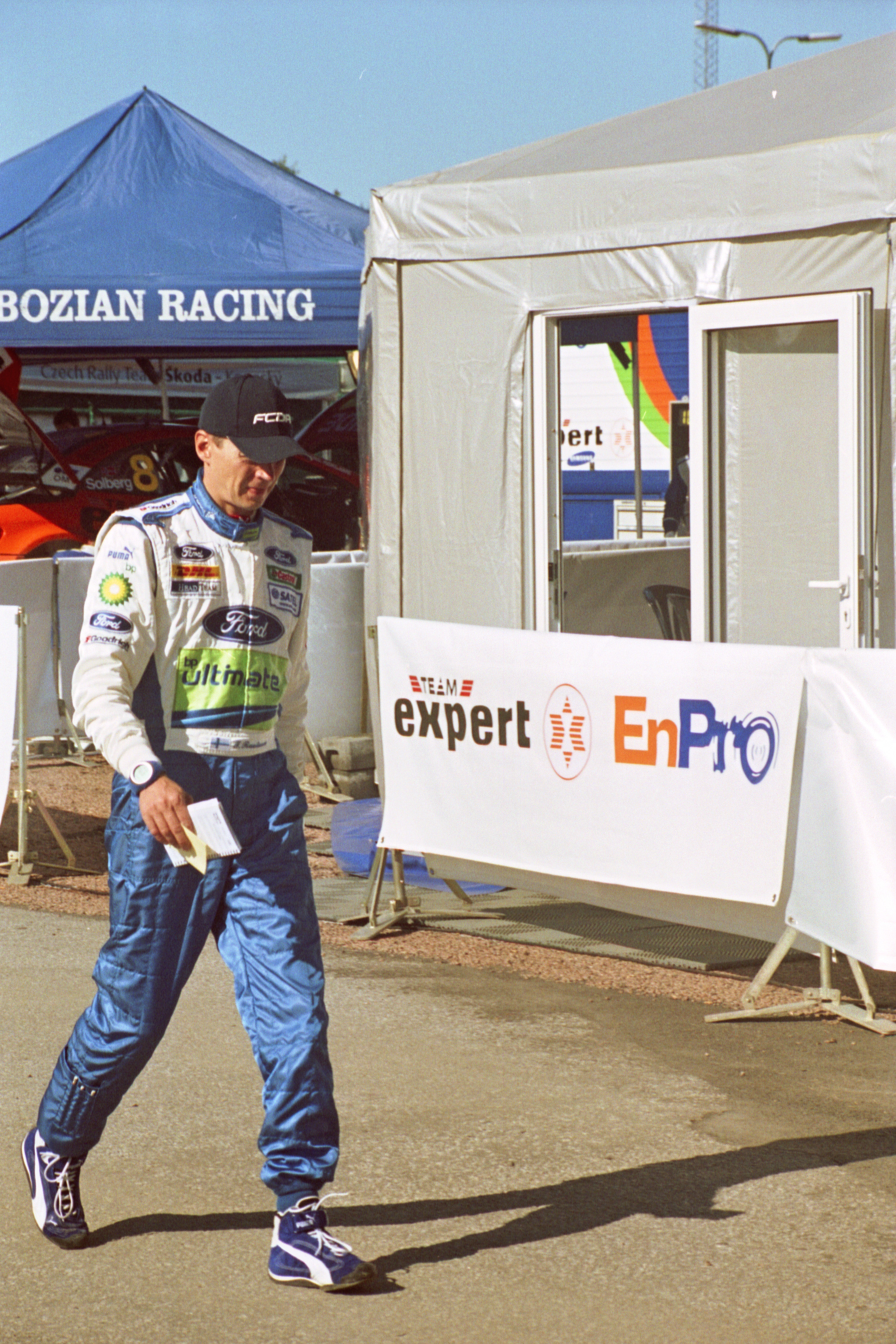
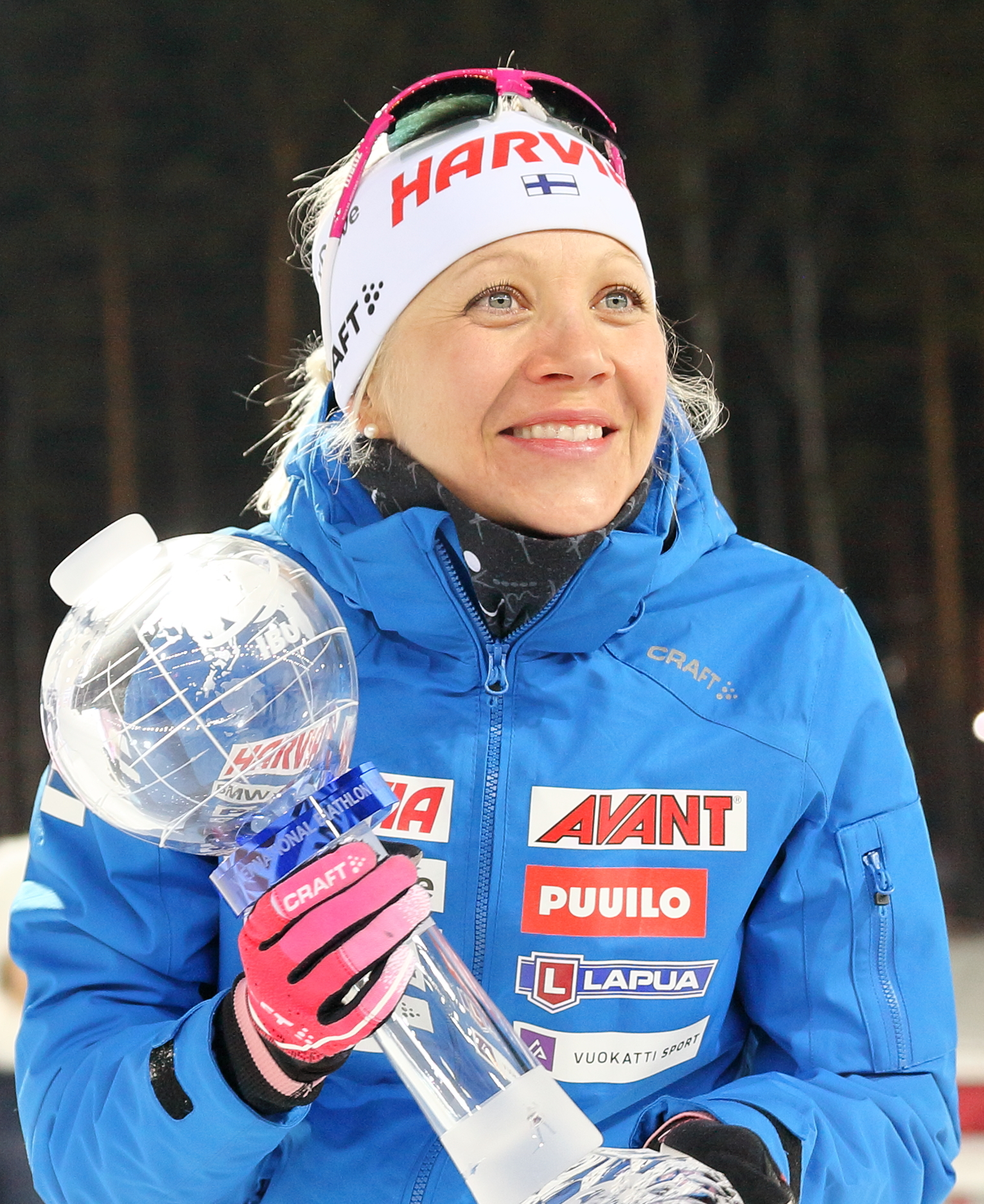
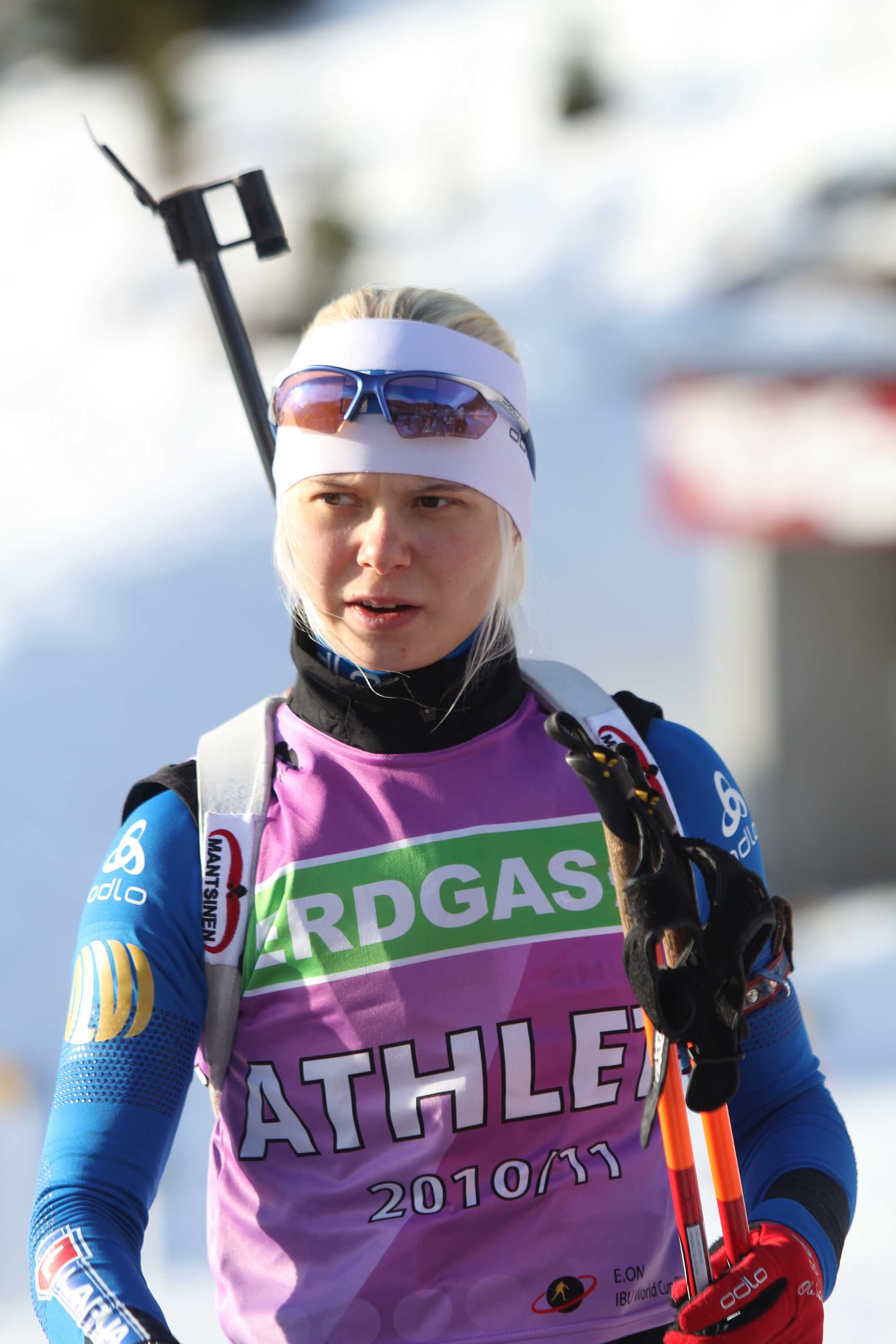
From left to right: Anna Perho, Aino-Kaisa Pekonen, Silvia Modig, Lotta Hintsa, Katariina Kaitue, Jukka Rasila, Ilmari Nurminen, Peter Vesterbacka, Marcus Grönholm, Timo Rautiainen, Kaisa Mäkäräinen and Mari Eder

Each team is composed of two individuals who have some type of relationship to each other. In the first season, there are 12 Finnish celebrity teams competing. Green League MP Fatim Diarra was asked to participate but declined.

Contestants	Notability	Age	Relationship	Status
Anna Perho	Author	52	Mother & Son	Eliminated 1st (in Bangkok, Thailand)
Atte Lehtiniittu	—N/a	22	Mother & Son	Eliminated 1st (in Bangkok, Thailand)
Aino-Kaisa Pekonen	Member of Parliament	44	Work Partners	Eliminated 2nd (in Phuket, Thailand)
Silvia Modig	Member of the European Parliament	46	Work Partners	Eliminated 2nd (in Phuket, Thailand)
Lotta Hintsa	Miss Finland 2013	34	Sisters	Medically removed (in Ho Chi Minh City, Vietnam)
Noora Hintsa	—N/a	32	Sisters	Medically removed (in Ho Chi Minh City, Vietnam)
Katariina Kaitue	Actress	56	Mother & Son	Eliminated 4th (in Ho Chi Minh City, Vietnam)
Benjamin Harima	—N/a	29	Mother & Son	Eliminated 4th (in Ho Chi Minh City, Vietnam)
Jukka Rasila	Finish Donald Duck voice actor	53	Cohabiting Couple	Eliminated 5th (in Manila, Philippines)
Mirva Nieminen	—N/a	45	Cohabiting Couple	Eliminated 5th (in Manila, Philippines)
Ilmari Nurminen	Member of Parliament	32	Couple	Eliminated 6th (in Pampanga, Philippines)
Aapo Hettula	—N/a	30	Couple	Eliminated 6th (in Pampanga, Philippines)
Peter Vesterbacka	Developer of Angry Birds	55	Mentor & Mentee	Eliminated 7th (in Yogyakarta, Indonesia)
Thy "Anna" Nguyen	—N/a	18	Mentor & Mentee	Eliminated 7th (in Yogyakarta, Indonesia)
Marcus Grönholm	WRC drivers' champion	55	Friends	Eliminated 8th (in Yogyakarta, Indonesia)
Timo Rautiainen	WRC co-drivers' champion	58	Friends	Eliminated 8th (in Yogyakarta, Indonesia)
Bakari Diarra	Entrepreneur, Vitunleija	25	Friends	Eliminated 9th (in George Town, Malaysia)
Samuel Chime	Social media personality	24	Friends	Eliminated 9th (in George Town, Malaysia)
Janne Lehtonen	Head Instructor on Erikoisjoukot	40	Friends	Third place
Robin Hendry	Instructor on Erikoisjoukot	37	Friends	Third place
Tuukka Ritokoski	Radio presenter on Radio Suomipop	28	Father & Son	Runners-up
Sami Ritokoski	—N/a	58	Father & Son	Runners-up
Kaisa Mäkäräinen	Biathlete	40	Friends	Winners
Mari Eder	Biathlete & Cross-country skier	35	Friends	Winners

== Results ==
The following teams are listed with their placements in each leg. Placements are listed in finishing order.

- A red placement with a dagger (†) indicates that the team was eliminated. A dagger without a placement indicates that the team was eliminated without competing in the leg.
- A blue placement with a double-dagger (‡) indicates that the team was the last to arrive at a Pit Stop in a non-elimination leg.
  - The team that finished last on the seventh and tenth legs had to perform a Speed Bump task in the subsequent leg.

Team placement (by leg)
Team	1	2	3	4 (Note: The third and fourth legs were combined to a "Super Leg", whereby all of the remaining teams were instructed to continue racing immediately after the third leg without a rest period.)	5	6	7	8	9	10	11	12
Kaisa & Mari	3rd	2nd	4th	4th	3rd	3rd	2nd	3rd	3rd	4th‡	2nd	1st
Tuukka & Sami	2nd	3rd	3rd	6th	6th	2nd	3rd	2nd	2nd	3rd	3rd	2nd
Janne & Robin	9th	7th	6th	2nd	4th	1st	1st	1st	1st	2nd	1st	3rd
Bakari & Samuel	1st	1st	1st	1st	2nd	4th	4th	4th	4th	1st	4th†	
Marcus & Timo	4th	4th	2nd	3rd	1st	6th	5th	5th	5th†			
Peter & Anna	6th	6th	5th	5th	7th	5th	6th‡	6th†				
Ilmari & Aapo	10th	10th	8th	8th‡	5th	7th†						
Jukka & Mirva	8th	8th	7th	7th	8th†							
Katariina & Benjamin	11th	9th	9th†									
Lotta & Noora	5th	5th	† (Note: Noora & Lotta left the competition at the start of the third leg after they both exhibited health difficulties.)									
Aino-Kaisa & Silvia	7th	11th†										
Anna & Atte	12th†											

== Race summary ==
Destinations	Air travel Rail travel Water travel Bus travel Helicopter travel Bicycle travel Gondola travel
Route Markers	Kiertotie (Detour) Tiesulku (Roadblock) Hidaste (Speed Bump) Etapin päätepiste (Pit Stop)

=== Leg 1 (Finland → Thailand) ===
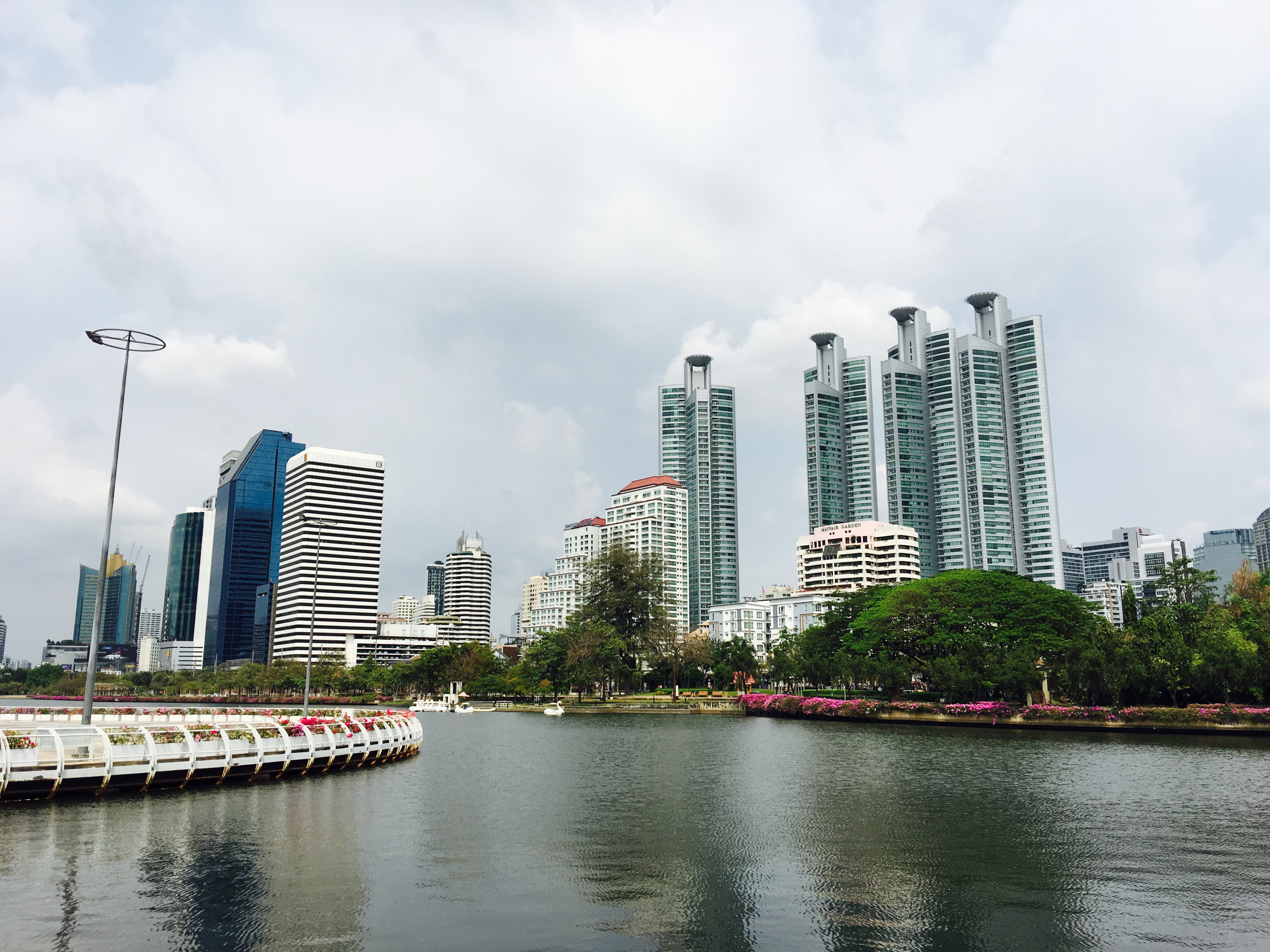
Benchakitti Park in Bangkok served as the first Pit Stop of the season.

- Episode 1: "In the Heart of the Big City" / "Suurkaupungin sykkeessä" (30 September 2023)
- Eliminated: Anna & Atte

Locations

- Helsinki, Finland (Töölönlahti Park (in Finnish)) (Starting Line)
- Helsinki (Helsinki–Vantaa Airport) → Bangkok, Thailand (Suvarnabhumi Airport)
- Bangkok (Benchasiri Park)
- Bangkok (Wat Saket)
- Bangkok (Talat Noi – So Heng Tai Mansion)
- Bangkok (Pak Khlong Talat)
- Bangkok (Wyndham Bangkok Queen Convention Centre)
- Bangkok (Benchakitti Park)

Episode summary

- Teams set off from Töölönlahti in Helsinki. After retrieving their first clue, teams had to match the names, flags and currencies of several countries in order to receive their next clue. Teams then had to travel by taxi or train to Helsinki–Vantaa Airport with only 40 euros, less than what would be normally required for a typical taxi ride to the airport, and fly to Bangkok, Thailand.

Country	Flag	Currency
Czech Republic	(Czech Republic)	Koruna
Malaysia	(Malaysia)	Ringgit
Mexico	(Mexico)	Peso
Thailand	(Thailand)	Baht
Tunisia	(Tunisia)	Dinar

- In Bangkok, teams were released from Suvarnabhumi Airport in the order that they arrived at Helsinki's airport. Teams then travelled to Benchasiri Park in order to find their next clue, a two-baht coin that depicts Wat Saket, by a spirit house.
- In this season's first Roadblock, one team member had to find a wrapped paper instructing them to receive their next clue inside one of the hundreds of bells at Wat Saket.
- After the Roadblock, teams had to travel to the So Heng Tai Mansion and fish lotus flowers from a pond until they found one with a miniature Amazing Race flag in order to receive their next clue. Teams then had to travel by long-tail boat to Pak Khlong Talat with only a photograph of a relief as a hint in order to find their next clue.
- This season's first Detour was a choice between Flowers (Kukat) or Cartons (Kennot). In Flowers, teams had to string flowers in order to make two phuang malais and receive their next clue. In Cartons, teams had to deliver 20 cartons of intact chicken eggs to a vendor and eat a century egg in order to receive their next clue.
- After the Detour, teams had to travel to the Wyndham Bangkok Queen Convention Centre in order to find their next clue. From the top of the building, teams had to find the Pit Stop: Benchakitti Park.

=== Leg 2 (Thailand) ===
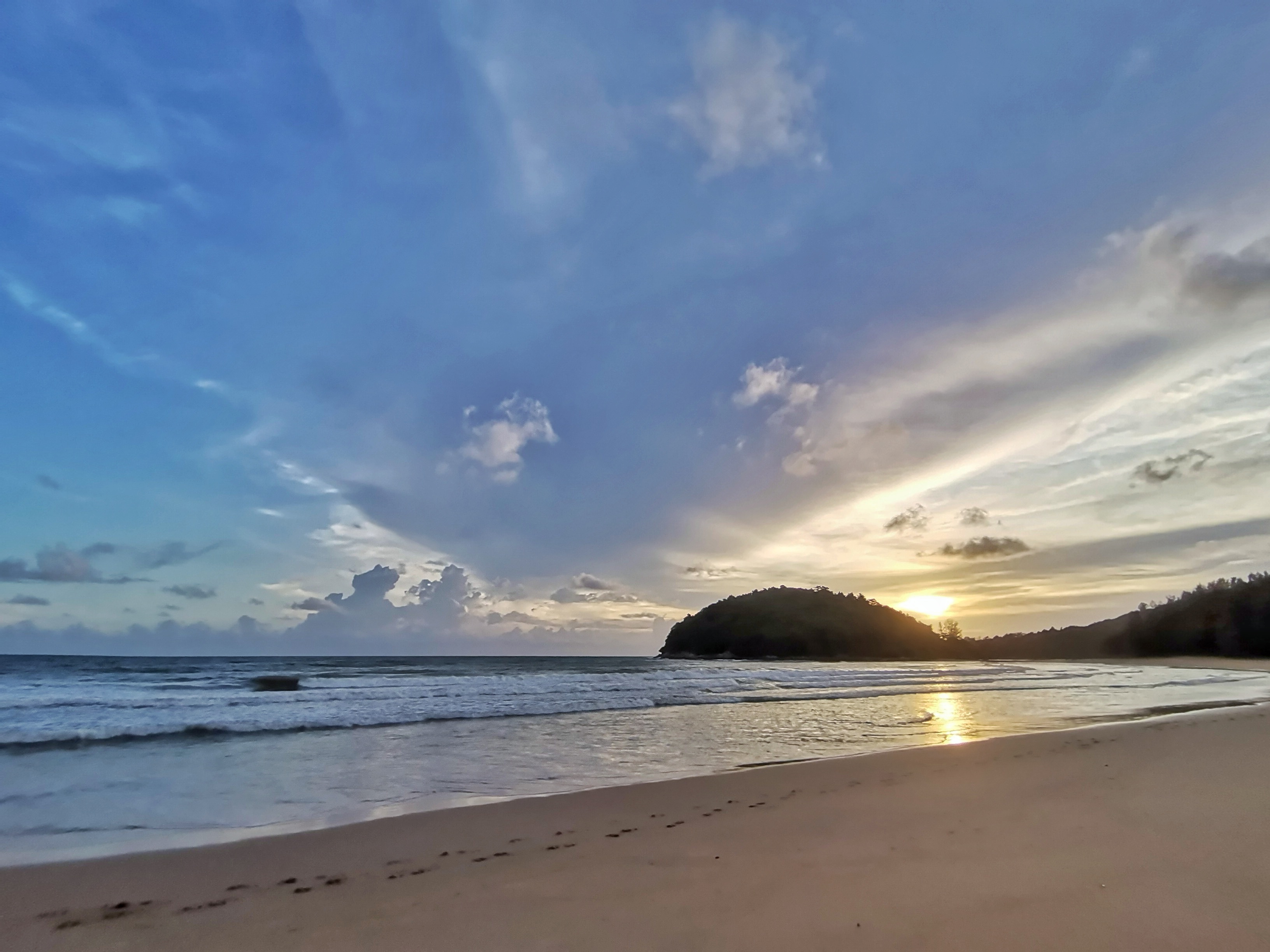
Teams visited the beaches of Phuket, including Layan Beach for the Detour, during the second leg.

- Episode 2: "An Impossible Challenge" / "Mahdoton haaste" (7 October 2023)
- Eliminated: Aino-Kaisa & Silvia

Locations

- Bangkok (Benchakitti Park)
- Bangkok (Suvarnabhumi Airport) → Phuket (Phuket International Airport)
- Choeng Thale (Cassia Phuket)
- Si Sunthon (Wat Sri Sunthon)
- Choeng Thale (Elephant Retirement Park)
- Choeng Thale (Layan Beach)
- Mai Khao (Wat Mai Khao)
- Mai Khao (Sai Kaew Beach)

Episode summary

- At the start of this leg, teams were instructed to travel to Phuket. Once there, teams were released from Cassia Phuket in the order that they finished the previous leg and were instructed to travel by songthaew to Wat Sri Sunthon and find their next clue by the reclining Buddha. Teams then travelled to the Elephant Retirement Park in order to find their next clue. There, teams had to memorise a recipe for rice balls, choose the correct ingredients from an array and prepare nine rice balls for the elephants in order to receive their next clue directing them to Layan Beach.
- This leg's Detour was a choice between Cutting (Hakkuu) or Sand (Hiekka). In Cutting, teams had to use hammers to crack open coconuts until they found one with red dye in order to receive their next clue. In Sand, teams had to dig in a marked area of beach until they found a miniature wooden turtle in order to receive their next clue.
- After the Detour, teams had to travel to Wat Mai Khao in order to find their next clue.
- In this leg's Roadblock, one team member had to remain still for 10 minutes while balancing a stack of coins on their backhands and head in order to receive their next clue directing them to the Pit Stop at Sai Kaew Beach; otherwise they had to start the task again.

=== Leg 3 (Thailand → Vietnam) ===
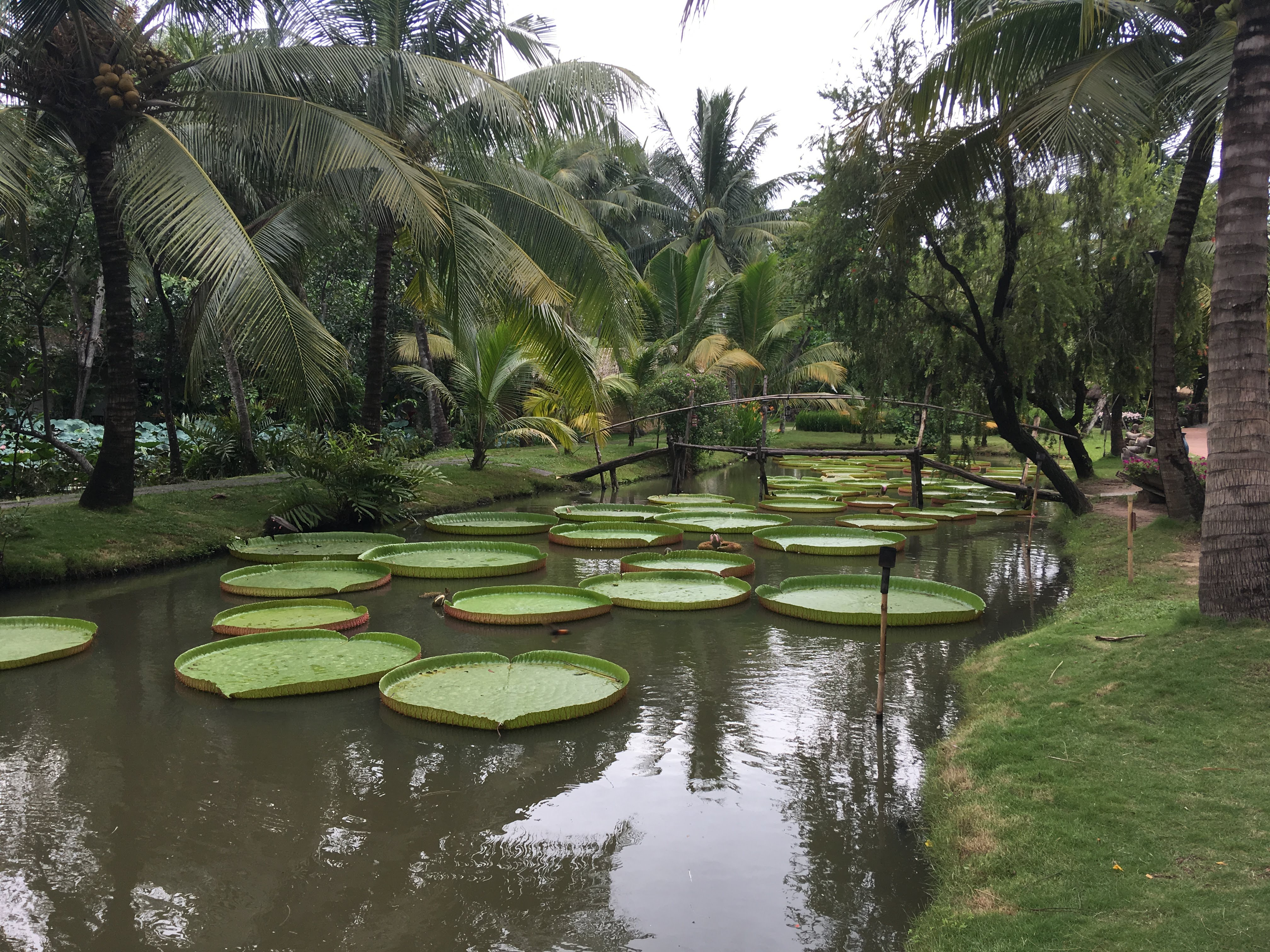
This leg's Detour on Thanh Đa Island was set in Bình Quới Village.

- Episode 3: "Local Fun" / "Paikallista hupia" (14 October 2023)
- Medically Removed: Lotta & Noora
- Eliminated: Katariina & Benjamin

Locations

- Choeng Thale (Cassia Phuket)
- Phuket (Phuket International Airport) → Ho Chi Minh City, Vietnam (Tan Son Nhat International Airport)
- Ho Chi Minh City (New World Saigon Hotel)
- Ho Chi Minh City (Chung Cư Thanh Đa)
- Ho Chi Minh City (Thanh Đa Restaurant)
- Ho Chi Minh City (Bình Quới Village)
- Ho Chi Minh City (The Bali Coffee & Tea)
- Ho Chi Minh City (Bình An Wharf)

Episode summary

- At the start of this leg, teams were instructed to fly to Ho Chi Minh City, Vietnam. Once there, teams were released from the New World Saigon Hotel in the order that they finished the previous leg and were instructed to travel by taxi to Thanh Đa Island and find their next clue on a cyclo. Teams had to pedal the cyclo along a marked course then travel by taxi to Thanh Đa Restaurant. There, teams had to catch one prawn from the restaurant's indoor pool in order to receive their next clue directing them to Bình Quới Village.
- This leg's Detour was a choice between Paddle (Mela) or Sling (Linko). In Paddle, teams had to paddle a basket boat and retrieve ten specifically coloured coconuts from a pond in order to receive their next clue. In Sling, teams had to play a folk game called ném còn and throw a toy through a hoop in order to receive their next clue.
- After the Detour, teams had to travel to The Bali Coffee & Tea in order to find their next clue.
- In this leg's Roadblock, one team member had to make a clay bowl using a potter's wheel in order to receive their next clue directing them to the Pit Stop: Bình An Wharf.

Additional notes

- Once in Ho Chi Minh City, Noora & Lotta withdrew from the race under medical advice after they both exhibited health difficulties.
- Although the last team to arrive at the Pit Stop was eliminated, there was no rest period at the end of the leg and all remaining teams were instead instructed to continue racing.

=== Leg 4 (Vietnam) ===
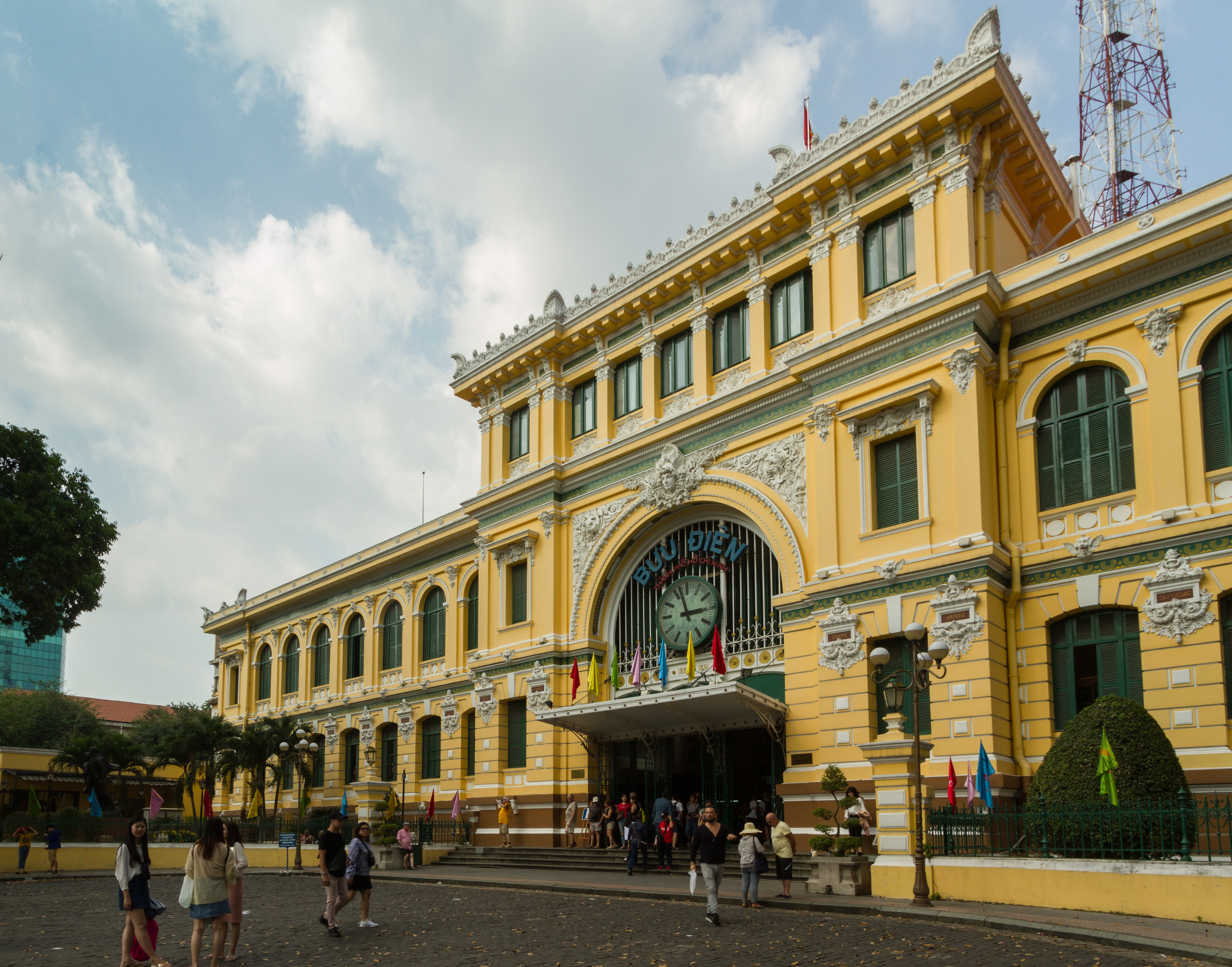
In the Old Saigon area of Ho Chi Minh City, teams visited the Saigon Central Post Office.

- Episode 4: "Shivering Lunch" / "Puistattava lounas" (21 October 2023)

Locations

- Ho Chi Minh City (Bình An Wharf → Bạch Đằng Wharf)
- Ho Chi Minh City (Saigon Central Post Office)
- Ho Chi Minh City (Turtle Lake (in Vietnamese))
- Ho Chi Minh City (Ốc Chị Em Restaurant)
- Ho Chi Minh City (Saigon Zoo and Botanical Gardens)
- Ho Chi Minh City (Cà Phê Trứng 3T & Thái Văn Lung Street)
- Ho Chi Minh City (Lam Sơn Square)

Episode summary

- At the start of this leg, teams had to travel by water taxi to Bạch Đằng Wharf and then by taxi to the Saigon Central Post Office in order to find their next clue directing them to Turtle Lake.
- In this leg's Roadblock, teams had to travel to Ốc Chị Em Restaurant, where one team member had to eat a plate of mealworms, grasshoppers, silkworms, a scorpion, a tarantula and cobra in order to receive their next clue.
- After the Roadblock, teams had to travel to the Saigon Zoo and Botanical Gardens in order to find their next clue.
- This leg's Detour was a choice between Kicks (Potkut) or Rhythms (Rytmit). In Kicks, teams had to play đá cầu, a game similar to hacky sack and Vietnam's national sport, and volley a shuttlecock six times in order to receive their next clue. In Rhythms, teams had to perform a lion dance drum routine in order to receive their next clue.
- After the Detour, teams had to carry ten sugarcane stalks to a vendor, press them until they could extract enough sugarcane juice to fill a pitcher and then both team member had to drink a glass of juice in order to receive their next clue directing them to the Pit Stop: Lam Sơn Square, overlooking the Saigon Opera House.

Additional note

- This was a non-elimination leg.

=== Leg 5 (Vietnam → Philippines) ===
In Manila, teams visited the Manila Zoo, where they faced this leg's Roadblock.

- Episode 5: "Buzzing Market" / "Markettipöhinää" (28 October 2023)
- Eliminated: Jukka & Mirva

Locations

- Ho Chi Minh City (New World Saigon Hotel)
- Ho Chi Minh City (Tan Son Nhat International Airport) → Manila, Philippines (Ninoy Aquino International Airport)
- Manila (The Manila Hotel)
- Parañaque (Victory Food Market)
- Manila (Manila Zoo)
- Manila (Rizal Park)
- Manila (Intersection of Kalaw Avenue & Roxas Boulevard)
- Manila (Plaza Moriones)

Episode summary

- At the start of this leg, teams were instructed to fly to Manila, Philippines. Once there, teams were released from The Manila Hotel in the order that they finished the previous leg and were instructed to travel by taxi to Victory Food Market, where they had to purchase school supplies for a charity in order to receive their next clue directing them to the Manila Zoo.
- In this leg's Roadblock, one team member had to go inside a snake exhibit and figure out within five minutes that four boxes corresponded to a combination needed to open a locked box containing their next clue; otherwise, they had to wait out a time penalty before trying again.
- After the Roadblock, teams had to travel to Rizal Park in order to find their next clue.
- This leg's Detour was a choice between Screws (Ruuvit) or Pots (Ruukut). In Screws, teams had to correctly assemble a scooter so that it matched an example in order to receive their next clue. In Pots, teams had to perform a banga dance, which involved balancing a stack of two banga pots on their heads without dropping them, in order to receive their next clue.
- After the Detour, teams had to travel by kalesa to the Pit Stop: Plaza Moriones, overlooking Fort Santiago.

=== Leg 6 (Philippines) ===
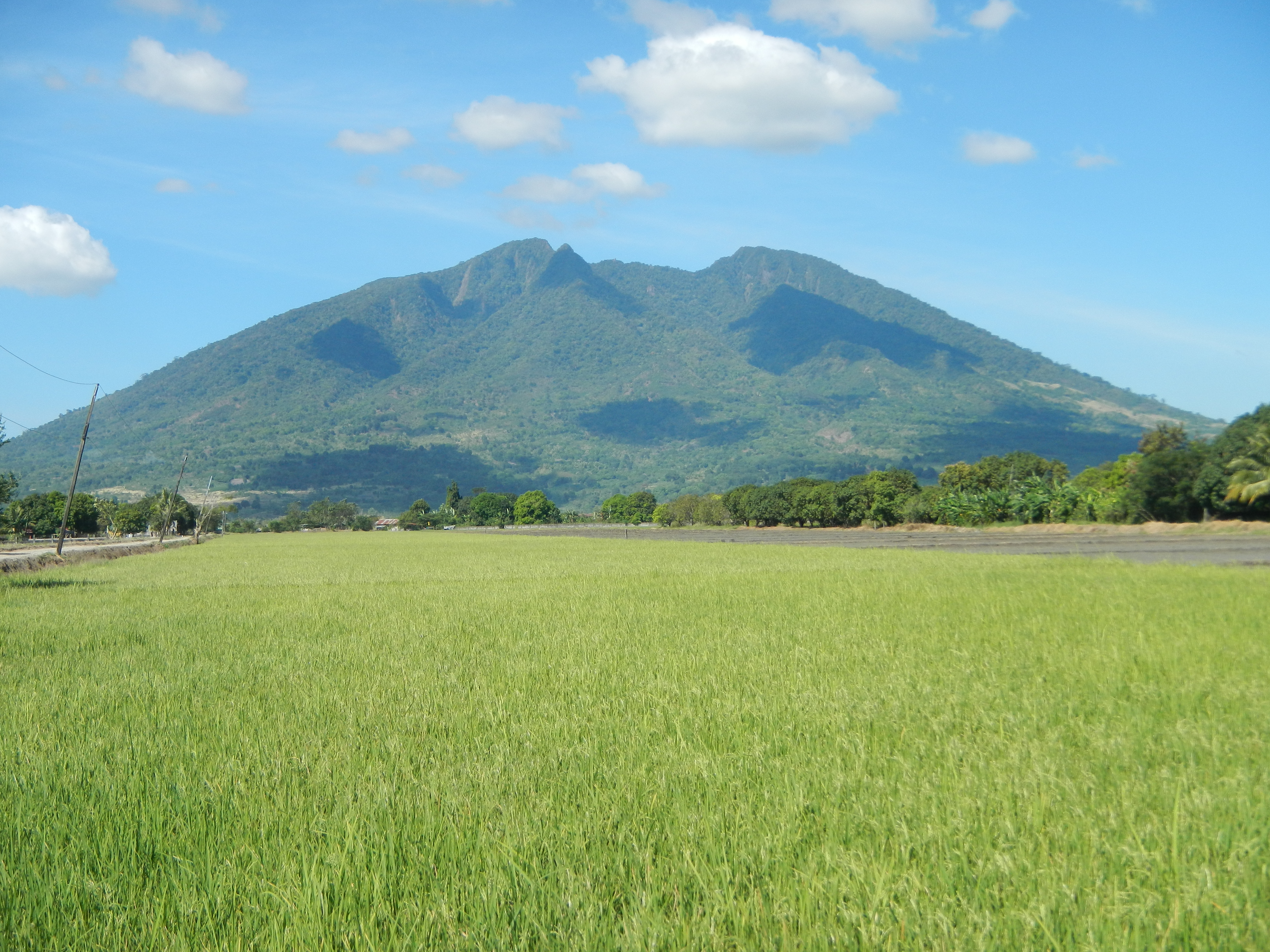
Much of the sixth leg was set in Pampanga in the region surrounding Mount Arayat.

- Episode 6: "The Worst Nightmare" / "Pahin painajainen" (4 November 2023)
- Eliminated: Ilmari & Aapo

Locations

- Manila (The Manila Hotel)
- Magalang (Angeles City Flying Club)
- Pandacaqui (Plaza Pandacaqui Oval)
- Buenavista (Rice Fields) or Cawayan (Cawayan Basketball Court)
- Arayat (Gintung Pakpak Eco Park)
- Arayat (Gintung Pakpak Eco Park – Viewing Deck)

Episode summary

- At the start of this leg, teams were instructed to travel by hired car to the Angeles City Flying Club in the province of Pampanga. There, teams had to wait until 6:00 am when the gates of the airport opened in order to retrieve their next clue.
- In this leg's Roadblock, one team member had to fly in an ultralight plane and hit a target below on the ground with one of two colored bags in order to receive their next clue; otherwise, they had to go to the back of the line before trying again.
- After the Roadblock, teams had to travel by jeepney to the barangay of Pandacaqui in order to find their next clue. There, teams had to perform karaoke of a local children's song, "Tatlong Bibe", in Filipino to an audience in order to receive their next clue.
- This leg's Detour was a choice between Frogs (Konnat) or Baskets (Korit). In Frogs, teams took part in a San Fernando Frog Festival and had to find ten rubber frogs in a rice field while handcuffed to each other in order to receive their next clue. In Baskets, teams had to score two baskets in a five-minute basketball game against local teenagers in order to receive their next clue.
- After the Detour, teams had to travel to the gate of Gintung Pakpak Eco Park and receive their next clue directing them to the nearby Pit Stop.

=== Leg 7 (Philippines → Indonesia) ===
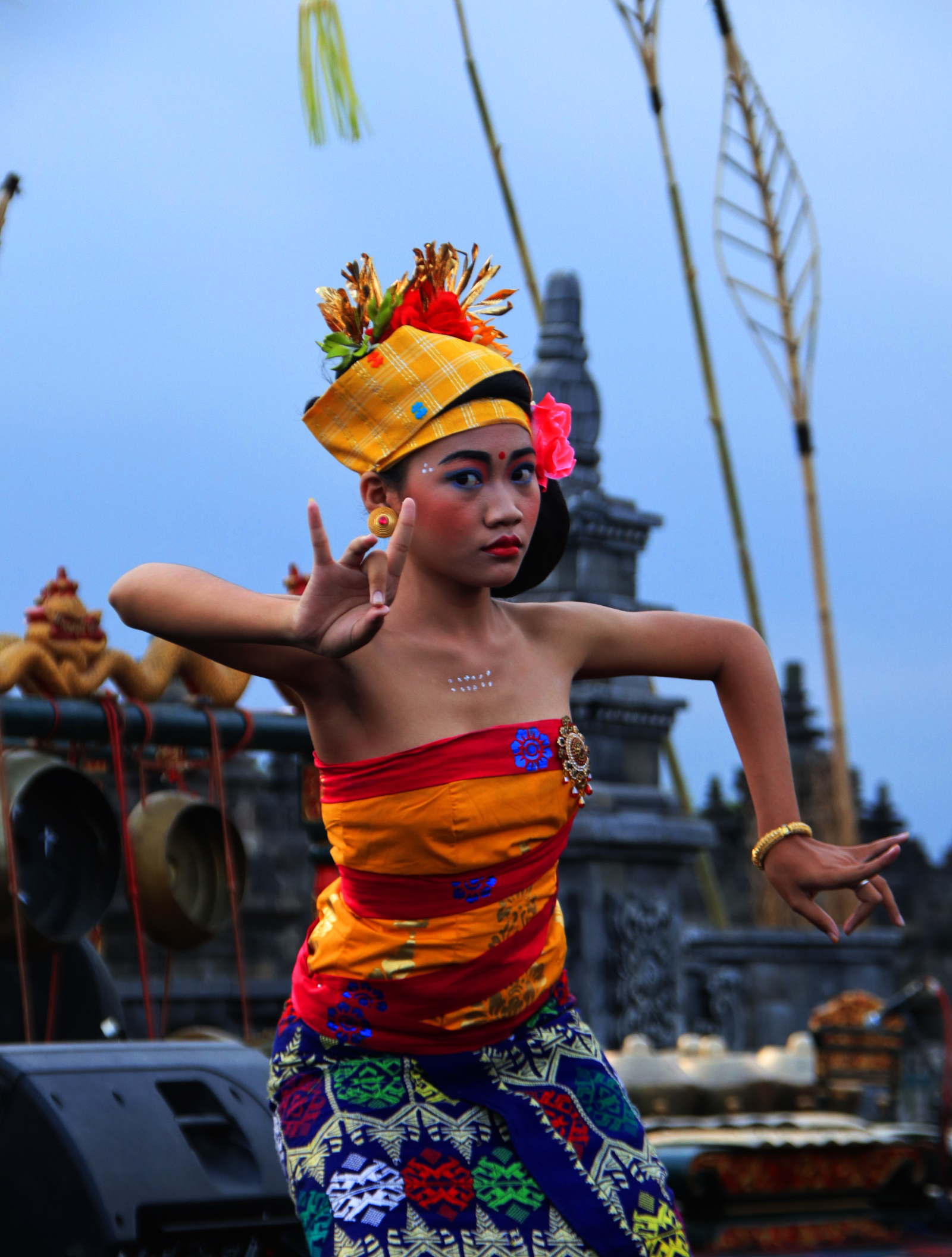
Racers performed a Balinese dance for the Roadblock in Bali.

- Episode 7: "Magic of Dance" / "Tanssin taikaa" (11 November 2023)

Locations

- Manila (The Manila Hotel)
- Manila (Ninoy Aquino International Airport) → Denpasar, Indonesia (Ngurah Rai International Airport)
- Kuta (Hotel Santika Seminyak Bali)
- Denpasar (Taman Werdhi Budaya Art Centre)
- Denpasar (Pantai Mertasari)
- Denpasar (Taman Inspirasi)
- Denpasar (Sari Wisata Budaya)
- Kuta (Pantai Jerman)

Episode summary

- At the start of this leg, teams were instructed to fly to Denpasar, Indonesia on the island of Bali. Once there, teams were released from the Hotel Santika Seminyak Bali in the order that they finished the previous leg and were instructed to travel by taxi to the Taman Werdhi Budaya Art Centre, where they had to unscramble the name of their next destination – MERTASARI – in order to receive their next clue. Teams could ask for additional hints, but would receive a five-minute penalty for each hint. After travelling to Pantai Mertasari, teams found their next clue.
- This leg's Detour was a choice between Appeasing (Hyvittely) or Craving (Havittelu). In Appeasing, teams had to assemble an offering known as a Banten Tegeh so that it matched an example and place it atop one team member's head before bringing it to the judge in order to receive their next clue. In Craving, teams had to attach an outrigger to a jukung, paddle out to a series of fishing traps, and find one with their next clue.
- After the Detour, teams were instructed to complete a traditional Indonesian pole climb known as Panjat Pinang, where both team members had to climb to the top of a Pinang palm tree pole and retrieve a toy marked with an Amazing Race flag in order to receive their next clue, which directed them to Sari Wisata Budaya.
- In this leg's Roadblock, one team member had to perform a Balinese dance in order to receive their next clue, which directed them to the Pit Stop: Pantai Jerman in Kuta.

Additional note

- This was a non-elimination leg.

=== Leg 8 (Indonesia) ===
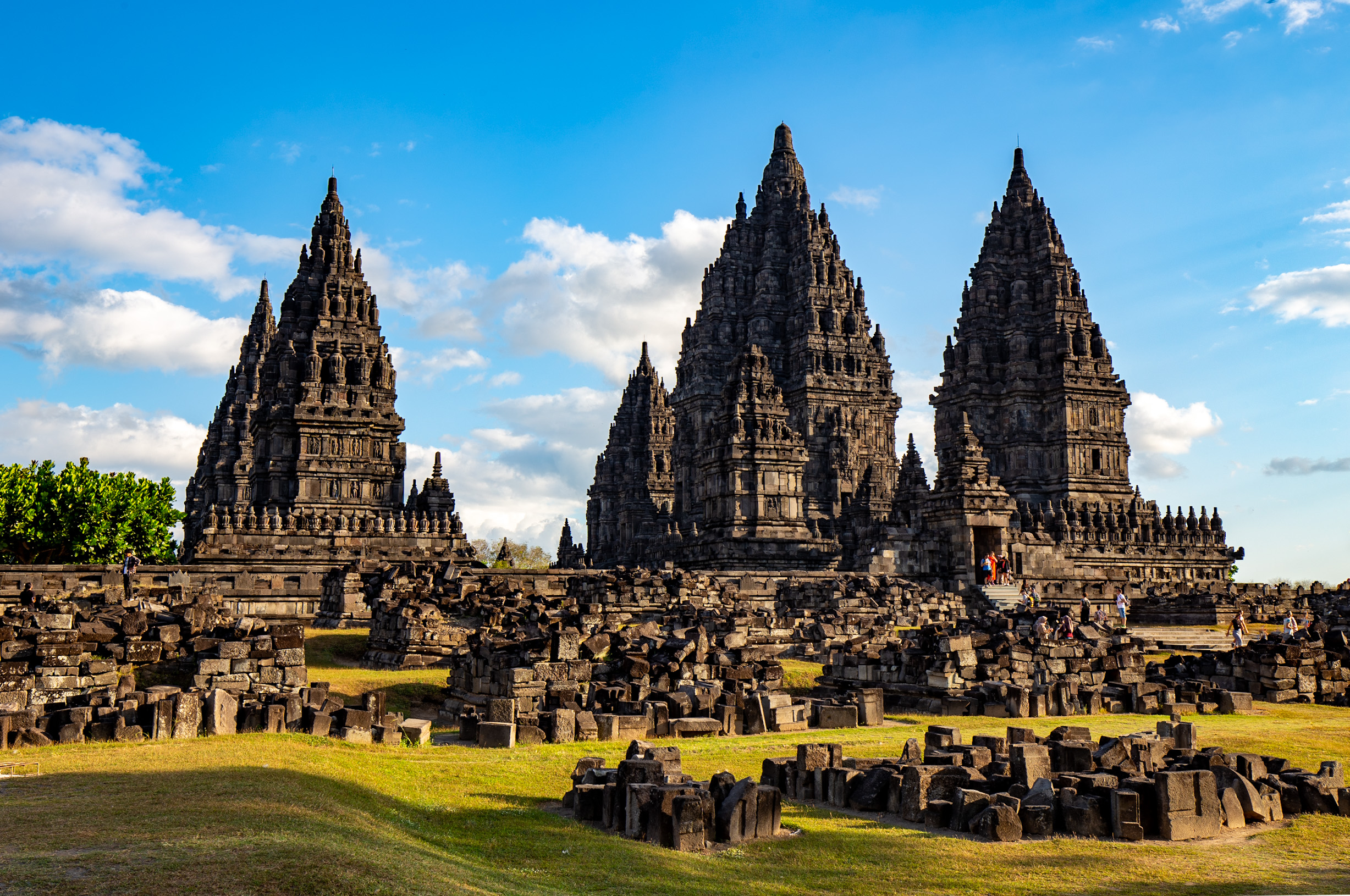
This leg visited Prambanan Temple in the Special Region of Yogyakarta for the Detour.

- Episode 8: "Bull's Eye" / "Häränsilmä" (18 November 2023)
- Prize: A vacation in Finnish Lakeland provided by Multivita (awarded to Janne & Robin)
- Eliminated: Peter & Anna

Locations

- Kuta (Pantai Jerman)
- Denpasar (Ngurah Rai International Airport) → Yogyakarta (Yogyakarta International Airport)
- Yogyakarta (Landhuis Resto)
- Sleman (Prambanan Temple)
- Yogyakarta (Pasar Beringharjo & Masjid Muttaqien)
- Yogyakarta (Batik Ndalem Sri Rejeki)
- Yogyakarta (Alun-Alun Selatan)
- Yogyakarta (nDalem Ngabean)

Episode summary

- At the start of this leg, teams were instructed to fly to Yogyakarta on the island of Java. Once there, teams retrieved their next clue at Landhuis Resto in the order that they finished the previous leg.
- For their Speed Bump, Peter & Anna had to order two cups of Java coffee and snacks in Indonesian and enjoy those, before they could continue racing.
- Teams were instructed to travel by taxi to the Prambanan Temple compound in order to find their next clue.
- This leg's Detour was a choice between Bows (Jouset) or Gods (Jumalat). In Bows, teams had to take part in a traditional form of Javanese archery called Jemparingan, where both team members had to hit a target with an arrow while sitting down in order to receive their next clue. In Gods, teams would have had to memorise the names and locations of the Hindu deities inside the temple. Then, they had to correctly label the locations of the deities by their names on a temple map in order to receive their next clue. All teams chose Bows.
- After the Detour, teams had to travel to Pasar Beringharjo, where they had to make ten takeaway bags of bakso, deliver them to a mosque and return to the market in order to receive their next clue. Teams then had to travel to Batik Ndalem Sri Rejeki and find a batik shirt that matched the textile sample in their clue in order to receive their next clue. After travelling to Alun-Alun Selatan, teams had to pedal a cart called an odong-odong around the square until they could inflate a bunch of balloons in order to receive their next clue, which instructed them to travel by odong-odong to the Pit Stop: nDalem Ngabean.

=== Leg 9 (Indonesia) ===
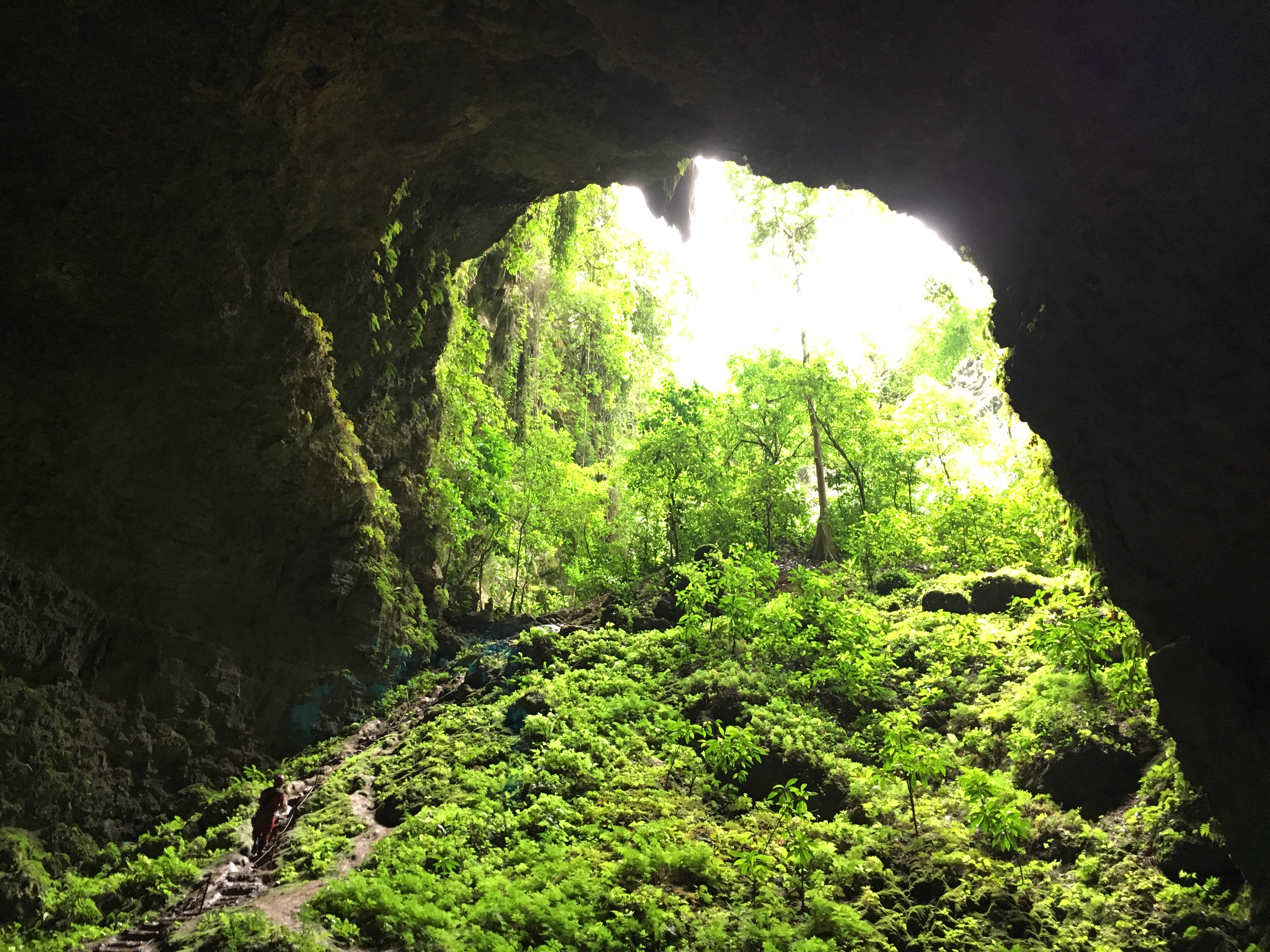
In this leg's first Roadblock, one team member had to traverse a tightrope over the Goa Jomblang.

- Episode 9: "On the Wire" / "Vaijerin varassa" (25 November 2023)
- Eliminated: Marcus & Timo

Locations

- Yogyakarta (GAIA Cosmo Hotel)
- Semanu (Goa Jomblang (in Indonesian))
- Jogotirto (Desa Jlatren (in Indonesian))
- Yogyakarta (Sonobudoyo Museum)
- Yogyakarta (Fort Vredeburg)

Episode summary

- At the start of this leg, teams were instructed to travel by taxi to Goa Jomblang in order to find their next clue.
- In this leg's first Roadblock, one team member had to tightrope walk 50 metres (160 ft) above Goa Jomblang, climb down a ladder to retrieve a flag, return to their partner and exchange the flag for their next clue.
- After the first Roadblock, teams had to travel to Desa Jlatren in order to find their next clue. There, teams had to transfer rice by hand across a rice paddy by hand until they could fill a bucket while avoiding two kebo-keboan, humans dressed as bulls who would attempt to block their path, in order to receive their next clue directing them to the Sonobudoyo Museum.
- In this leg's second Roadblock, one team member, regardless of who performed the previous Roadblock, had to play "Lancaran Manyar Sewu" on a saron alongside a gamelan without using sheet music in order to receive their next clue, which directed them to the Pit Stop: Fort Vredeburg.

Additional note

- Marcus & Timo elected to quit the second Roadblock and receive a two-hour penalty.

=== Leg 10 (Indonesia → Malaysia) ===
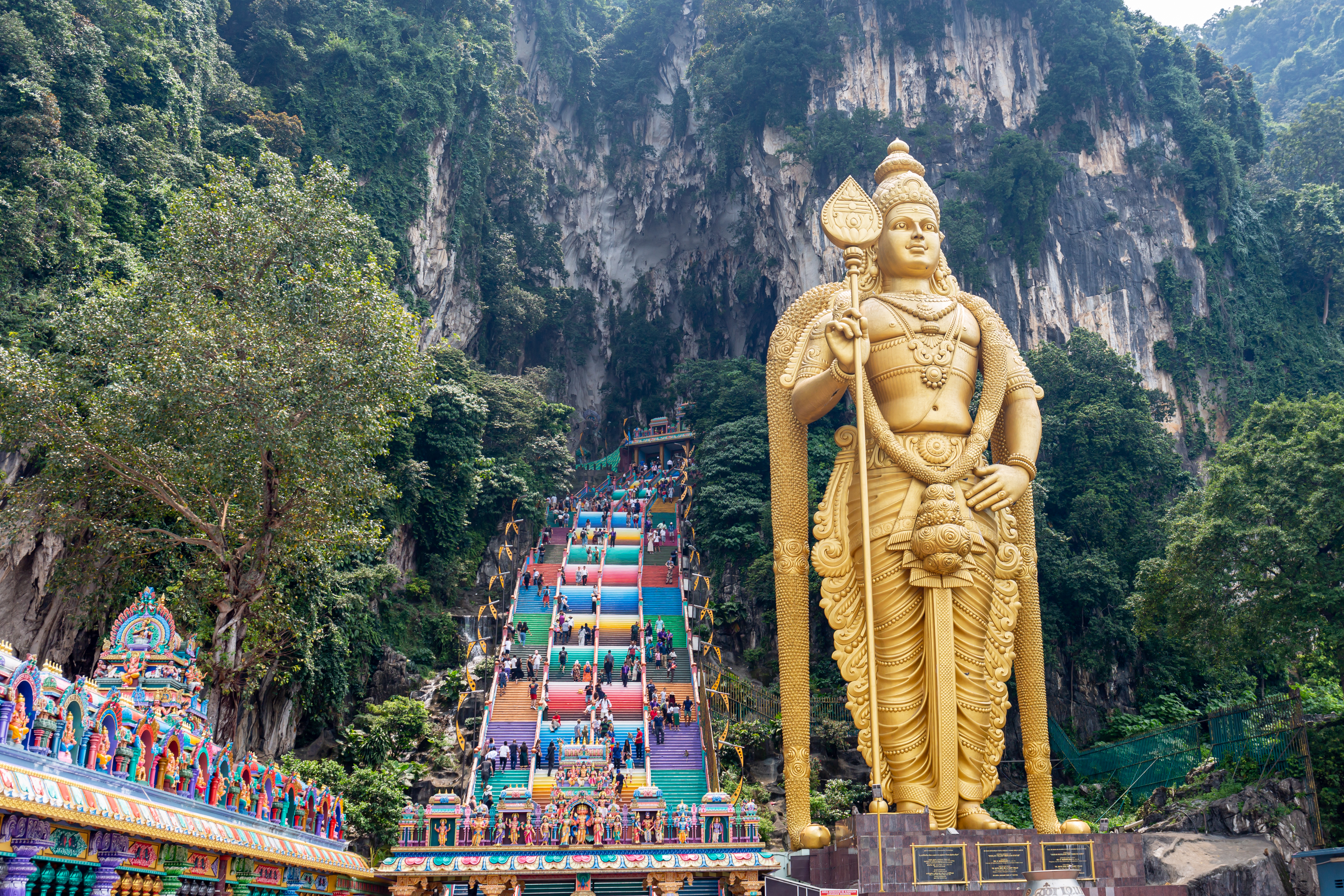
Racers had to ascend the stairs of Batu Caves and deliver an offering while in Kuala Lumpur.

- Episode 10: "The Temple Gift" / "Temppelilahja" (2 December 2023)

Locations

- Yogyakarta (GAIA Cosmo Hotel)
- Yogyakarta (Yogyakarta International Airport) → Kuala Lumpur, Malaysia (Kuala Lumpur International Airport)
- Kuala Lumpur (KLIA Terminal 2 ERL Station → Kuala Lumpur Sentral)
- Kuala Lumpur (BookXcess RexKL (in Malay))
- Gombak (Batu Caves)
- Kuala Lumpur (Saloma Link)
- Kuala Lumpur (Durian Power or Kuala Lumpur Craft Complex)
- Kuala Lumpur (KH Tower – Heli Lounge Bar)

Episode summary

- At the start of this leg, teams were instructed to fly to Kuala Lumpur, Malaysia. Once there, teams were released from the airport in the order that they finished the previous leg and were instructed to travel by train to Kuala Lumpur Sentral station and then by taxi to BookXcess RexKL in order to find their next clue. Inside their clue, teams found a small photograph depicting the corner of a book cover and had to find the matching book in order to receive their next clue, which directed them to Batu Caves.
- In this leg's Roadblock, one team member had to ascend 330 stairs up to Batu Caves with a fruit offering while counting the number of steps and avoiding the monkeys. Once at the top, they had to give their offering to a Hindu priest and provide the correct number of steps in order to receive their next clue.
- After the Roadblock, teams had to travel by taxi to the Saloma Link in order to find their next clue.
- This leg's Detour was a choice between Scent (Tuoksu) or Burn (Polte). Only two teams could complete each Detour task. In Scent, teams had to peel open and package 15 durians. Then, teams had to sample some durian before receiving their next clue. In Burn, teams had to sample two spice blends and then recreate them in order to receive their next clue.
- After the Detour, teams had to memorise a local greeting (Jom makan angin), travel to the KH Tower and then use the greeting in order to gain access to the Pit Stop: the Heli Lounge Bar.

Additional note

- This was a non-elimination leg.

=== Leg 11 (Malaysia) ===
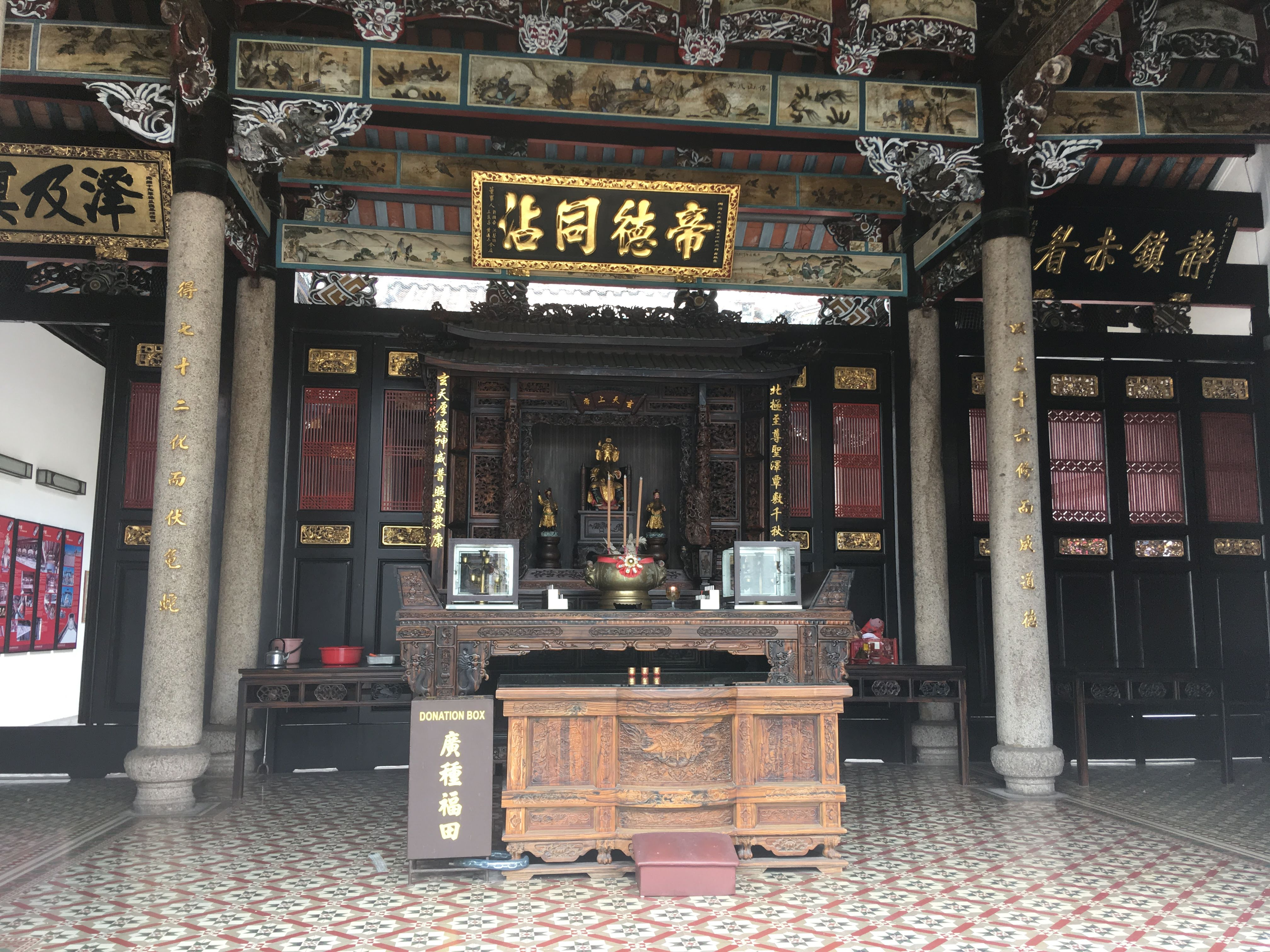
In Penang, teams visited the Han Jiang Ancestral Temple and performed a Chinese opera fight routine.

- Episode 11: "Street Art and Stick Fighting" / "Katutaidetta ja keppitaistelua" (9 December 2023)
- Eliminated: Bakari & Samuel

Locations

- Kuala Lumpur (Pullman Kuala Lumpur City Centre)
- Kuala Lumpur (Kuala Lumpur Railway Station) → Butterworth, Penang (Butterworth Railway Station)
- Butterworth (Sultan Abdul Halim Ferry Terminal) → George Town (Raja Tun Uda Ferry Terminal)
- George Town (Hean Boo Thean Temple)
- George Town (Central Fire Station)
- George Town (Armenian Street)
- George Town (Han Jiang Ancestral Temple)
- George Town (Penang Hill – Bellevue Hotel)
- George Town (Penang Botanic Gardens)

Episode summary

- At the start of this leg, teams were instructed to travel by train to the state of Penang. Once there, teams received their next clue at the Sultan Abdul Halim Ferry Terminal and were instructed to travel by ferry to the city of George Town and find their next clue at the Hean Boo Thean Temple.
- For their Speed Bump, Kaisa & Mari had to fold a series of joss papers and burn them in the fire for a local spiritual ritual before they could continue racing.
- From Hean Boo Thean Temple, teams had to travel to the Central Fire Station in order to find their next clue. Teams then had to find three different murals along Armenian Street and photograph themselves in front of them with locals in order to receive their next clue, which directed them to the Han Jiang Ancestral Temple. There, teams had to perform a Chinese opera stick fighting act. After receiving their next clue, teams had to travel by funicular to the top of Penang Hill, where they had to replicate a platter of kuih and fruit in order to receive their next clue.
- In this leg's Roadblock, one team member had to shoot three pieces of fruit with a Malaysian blowpipe in order to receive their next clue, which directed them to the nearby Pit Stop: the Penang Botanic Gardens.

=== Leg 12 (Malaysia → Singapore → Finland) ===
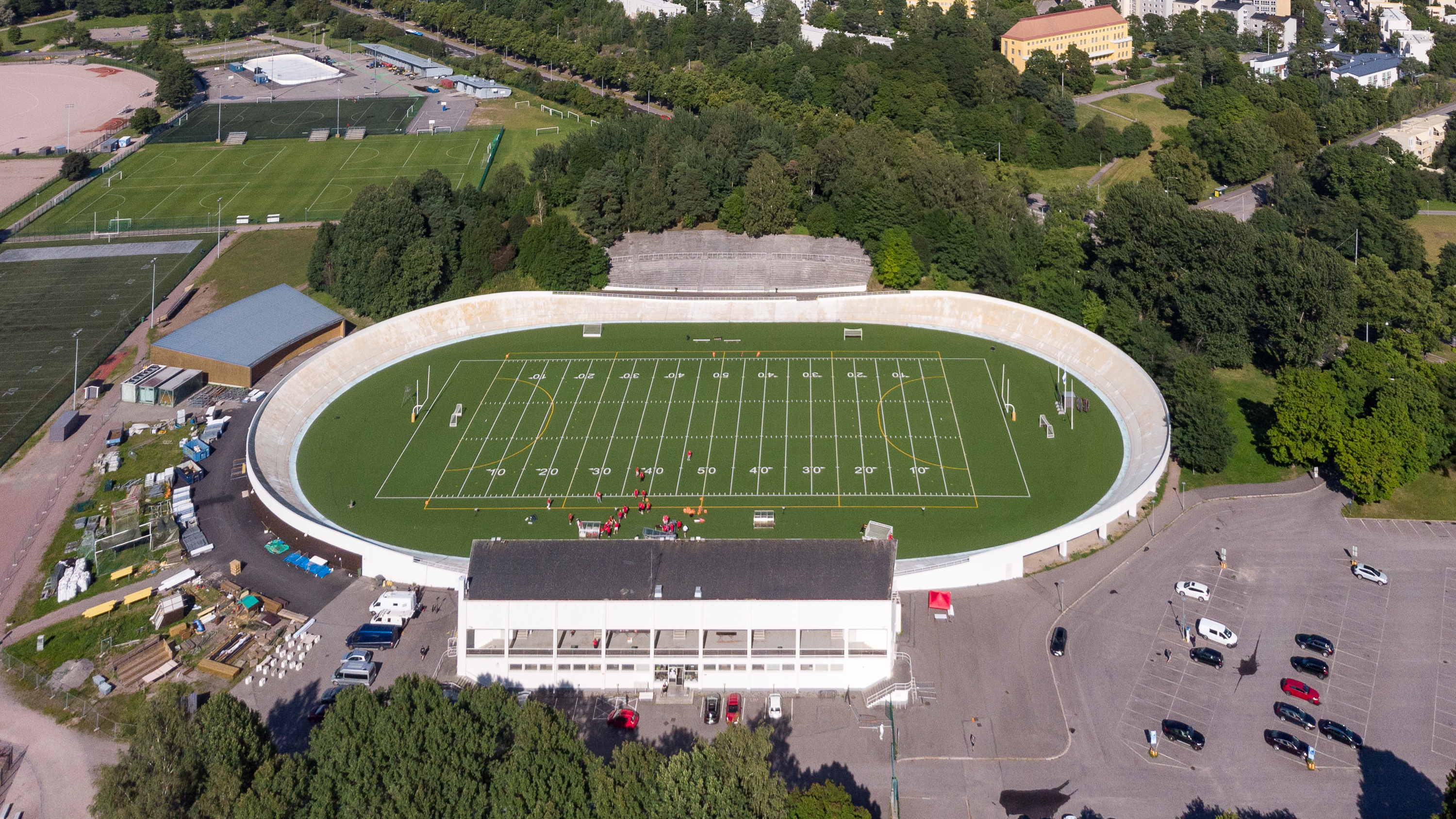
The first season of Amazing Race Suomi concluded at the Helsinki Velodrome.

- Episode 12: "The Final Squeeze" / "Viimeinen puristus" (16 December 2023)
- Prize: €30,000
- Winners: Kaisa & Mari
- Runners-up: Tuukka & Sami
- Third place: Janne & Robin

Locations

- George Town (Penang Botanic Gardens)
- George Town (Penang International Airport) → Singapore (Changi Airport)
- Singapore (Istana Park)
- Singapore (Marina Barrage)
- Singapore (ASL Marine Shipyard)
- Singapore (Chinatown – Smith Street)
- Singapore (Singapore Botanic Gardens)
- Singapore (Clarke Quay – Slingshot Singapore)
- Singapore (Changi Airport) → Helsinki, Finland (Helsinki–Vantaa Airport)
- Vantaa (Håkansböle Manor (in Finnish))
- Helsinki (Helsinki Velodrome)

Episode summary

- At the start of this leg, teams were instructed to fly to Singapore. Once there, teams were released from Istana Park in the order that they finished the previous leg and were instructed to travel to Marina Barrage in order to find their next clue.
- In this season's final Roadblock, one team member had to choose one of two keys, use a mechanical ascender to climb a tall crane at the Port of Singapore and use the key to release a bag of puzzle pieces. If racers chose the wrong key, they had to rappel back down, get the other key and climb back up again. Racers then had to assemble the puzzle, which depicted their next destination, in order to receive their next clue.
- After the Roadblock, teams had to travel to Smith Street in Chinatown in order to find their next clue.
- This season's final Detour was a choice between Dance (Tanssi) or Tea (Tee). In Dance, teams had to learn the choreography for a traditional Chinese lion dance in order to receive their next clues. In Tea, teams had to correctly identify seven different types of Chinese tea and then deliver them to a local tea shop in order to their next clue. If teams broke a tea cup, they had to switch tasks.
- After the Detour, teams had to travel to the Singapore Botanic Gardens, find the orchid amongst hundreds that was named after former Finnish Prime Minister Matti Vanhanen and reiterate the date that the prime minister visited Singapore listed on the placard in order to receive their next clue. Teams then had to ride a reverse bungee at Clarke Quay and locate a sign with Finnish text – KOTIA KOHTI (TO HOME) – in order to receive their next clue, which instructed them to fly to Helsinki, Finland. Teams were released from Helsinki–Vantaa Airport in the order which they arrived at Changi Airport and found their next clue. Teams had to travel to Håkansböle Manor and solve a puzzle by recalling essential facts of the season in order to receive their final clue, which directed them to the finish line: the Helsinki Velodrome.

Leg	City/state	Currency	Landmark	Object	Eliminated team
1	Bangkok	Baht	Wat Saket	Bell	Anna & Atte
2	Phuket	Baht	Wat Sri Sunthon	Coins	Aino-Kaisa & Silvia
3	Ho Chi Minh City	Dong	Thanh Đa	Pottery	Katariina & Benjamin
4	Ho Chi Minh City	Dong	Thao Cam Vien	Scorpion	No elimination
5	Manila	Peso	Fort Santiago	Snake	Jukka & Mirva
6	Pampanga	Peso	Pandacaqui	Microphone	Ilmari & Aapo
7	Bali	Rupiah	Sari Wisata Budaya	Panjat Pinang	No elimination
8	Yogyakarta	Rupiah	Prambanan	Bow	Peter & Anna
9	Yogyakarta	Rupiah	Benteng Vredeburg	Kebo-keboan	Marcus & Timo
10	Kuala Lumpur	Ringgit	Saloma Bridge	Book	No elimination
11	Penang	Ringgit	Hean Boo Thean	Blowpipe	Bakari & Samuel

== Reception ==
=== Critical reception ===
The Finnish season drew criticism for including Left Alliance politicians (Nurminen, Pekonen and Modig), who have advocated for reductions in greenhouse gas emissions, on a show that includes air travel. Filming of the show also began after the 2023 Greece wildfires on Rhodes, leading to more vocal criticism. Prior to the start of filming, producer Pauliina Koutala from Moskito Television stated that the show was made with climate change in mind and that they would be offsetting emissions used for filming, which included having teams fly on airlines that use sustainable aviation fuel and rainforest reclamation at the Rimba Raya Biodiversity Reserve on Borneo. In addition, the production team planned a route in such a way to minimise air travel with alternative forms of transportation on land. In total, all the contestants who reached the final leg travelled about 26,000 kilometres (16,000 mi) by airplanes, roughly corresponding to approximately two round trip flights from Helsinki to New York City. On 14 September 2023, Nurminen, Pekonen and Modig stated at a press event that they understood the criticism and agreed to compete after learning about the flight compensations.

Despite the negative social feedback, many Finnish television consumers were positive towards the first season's contestants with many praising the new and varied faces that have not been on reality television programs before. The fast-paced action and comedic elements of the show were praised, and the Finnish version was very similar and relatable to its original American counterpart. Even though the first season took place almost entirely in Southeast Asia and did not feature "flight drama", consumers were overall positive about how this huge format was made in Finland and expressed interest for another season.

According to Nelonen, the first season got a very respectful reception, with the program reach of the whole season reached the total of 2.9 million viewers from 4+ age group, if included all the streaming services and platforms. The average viewership for the season reached 429,000, with season finale picking up the highest average figures of the season for a single episode: 580,000. Prior to the season finale, the season was nominated for a Golden Venla Award in the category of "Competition Reality" and the Best Director (Jussi Korva & Olli Horttana).

=== Television ratings ===
The following ratings are taken from Finnpanel.

No.	Air date	Episode	Weekly rank	Viewers	Ref
1	30 September 2023	In the Heart of the Big City	1	375,000	
2	7 October 2023	An Impossible Challenge	3	305,000	
3	14 October 2023	Local Fun	3	305,000	
4	21 October 2023	Shivering Lunch	1	362,000	
5	28 October 2023	Buzzing Market	2	328,000	
6	4 November 2023	The Worst Nightmare	2	357,000	
7	11 November 2023	Magic of Dance	1	403,000	
8	18 November 2023	Bull's Eye	1	359,000	
9	25 November 2023	On the Wire	1	362,000	
10	2 December 2023	The Temple Gift	1	457,000	
11	9 December 2023	Street Art and Stick Fighting	2	408,000	
12	16 December 2023	The Final Squeeze	1	580,000	
