= Line sheet =

A line sheet is a sheet used by a manufacturer in the garment/fashion industry providing information on a product for wholesale sales. It allows a garment to be listed with the sizes in its size range, great for inventory tracking. It typically includes a line drawing or photograph of the product (possibly computer generated), its identification or SKU number, the style, and perhaps a swatch showing color and fabric. In lieu of swatches industry color standards such as Pantone numbers may be used. Price, minimum order amounts, order cutoff dates, contact and delivery information are also included.

A line sheet is a marketing tool that presents the needed information to the potential customer. It is used in both printed and digital formats.

== Structure ==
As the main idea of the line sheet is to present a big amount of information in a clear way, there is a certain structure.

Line Sheet consists of:

- Business general information
  - Business name
  - Logo
  - Contact information
  - Address
- Product details
  - Product variants
  - Size
  - Color
  - Material
  - Product's availability
  - Product number/SKU
- Wholesale information
  - Wholesale prices
  - Order minimum
  - Shipping details
  - Return policy

Sometimes a line sheet will also include a short description of the company's values and history. This is done to build an emotional connection with the client.

== Design ==
A professional line sheet has a clean and straightforward design, not to distract the attention of the product. It includes white or plain background and a simple linear structure. Fashion line sheet templates may consist of a cover shot or lifestyle image.

Include a call to action to direct your buyers. Ensure that the needed information, such as a phone number or a link to your website, is visible at first glance.

Create "new" and "bestsellers" headlines in your product line sheet to direct sales where they are most desired.
