= Swatch (disambiguation) =

Swatch is Swatch Group's namesake brand of watches.

Swatch may also refer to:

- The Swatch Group, a Swiss company and watch manufacturer
- Swatch Internet Time, an alternate means of telling time that uses decimals instead of hours and minutes
- A textile sample
- In computer graphics, the term has come to mean a palette of active colors.
- In painting, the word means a sample of color designed to show the actual dried result of applying certain paint(s).
- Swatch (knitting)
- Swatch Mercedes ART
- Swatch Open
- Swatch, an open source software project under SourceForge for monitoring Unix and Linux log files
- Swatch, a character in the video game Deltarune
