= Bali Arts Festival =

Bali Arts Festival Pesta Kesenian Bali ᬧᬾᬲ᭄ᬢᬓᬾᬲᬾᬦᬶᬬᬦ᭄ᬩᬮᬶ PKB
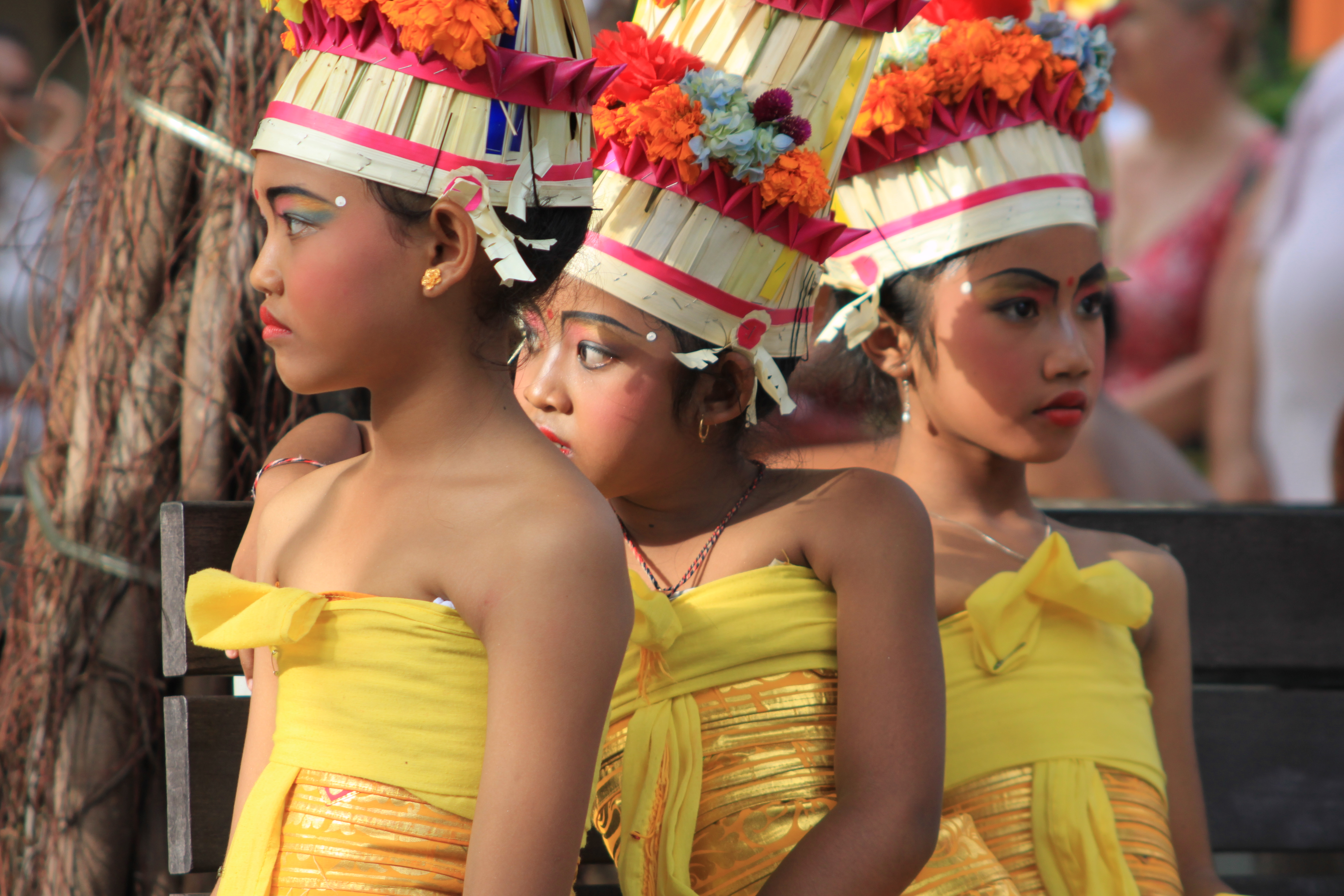
- Teen girl participants of the festival
- Genre: Arts festival
- Frequency: Annually
- Locations: Bali, Indonesia
- Country: Indonesia
- Inaugurated: 1979
- Next event: June 15 to July 13, 2024
- Website: pestakesenianbali.id

Bali Arts Festival (Indonesian: Pesta Kesenian Bali; Balinese: ᬧᬾᬲ᭄ᬢᬓᬾᬲᬾᬦᬶᬬᬦ᭄ᬩᬮᬶ) or PKB is an annual arts festival in Bali, Indonesia that celebrates, preserves and develops Balinese art and culture. First held in 1979 it has become Indonesia's longest-running arts festival. The month-long event begins with an inaugural parade usually held on the grounds of the Bajra Sandhi Monument and continues in its main venue, Taman Werdhi Budaya Art Centre, Denpasar. Traditional Balinese artists perform daily, as do performers from other parts of Indonesia and other countries. The festival also features competitions, seminars, and exhibitions of art, handicrafts and authentic Balinese cuisine.

== History ==
The festival was founded in 1979, during the governorship of Ida Bagus Mantra, to promote and sustain Balinese culture.

The basic organizing regulation of the Bali Arts Festival is the "Regional Regulation of Bali Province Number 07 of 1986 concerning Bali Art Festival".

The first Bali Arts Festival lasted approximately 2 months from June 20, 1979, to August 23, 1979. The festival attempts to preserve cultural arts by displaying classical art that is almost extinct and unknown to most in Balinese society.

The Bali Arts Festival is intended to motivate people to explore, discover and display the artistic contributions of the Balinese community. The PKB offers a variety of unique and different themes each year. Coinciding with the 25th Bali Arts Party, Balinese art is also displayed at Bali Art Pests and the Jubillium of the Silver Arts Festival of Bali.

In the history of the Bali Arts Party, it was typically inaugurated by high-ranking state officials. The PKB was first opened in 1979 by the late Ida Bagus Mantra, who at that time was the Governor of the Head of the Level I of Bali as well as the initiator of the PKB. The rest of the opening of the PKB was carried out by the Minister, Vice President, President and First Lady.
