= Two-baht coin =

Denomination of the Thai baht

2 baht
- Thailand
- Value: 2 Thai baht
- Mass: 4 g
- Diameter: 21.75 mm
- Edge: Segmented (Plain and Reeded edges)
- Composition: Aluminium bronze 92% Cu, 6% Al, 2% Ni
- Years of minting: 2005–present
- Catalog number: 52011

Obverse
- Design: H.M. King Maha Vajiralongkorn
- Designer: Designed by Mr Vudhichai Seangern. Sculpted by Mr Tummanoon Geawsawang.
- Design date: 2018

Reverse
- Design: Royal Monogram of King Vajiralongkorn
- Designer: Designed by Mr Chaiyod Soontrapa. Sculpted by Mr Tummanoon Geawsawang.
- Design date: 2018

In Thailand, the two-baht coin is the coin which is worth 2 baht or 200 satang. The new 2-baht coin design features H.M. King Bhumibol Adulyadej, the Great on the obverse, like all other Thai legal tender coins presently in circulation. The reverse design depicts the Golden Mountain at Wat Saket Ratcha Wora Maha Wihan in Bangkok.

Before the two-baht coin entered into circulation, this denomination was used as a commemorative coin since 1979. As of 1996, there is one cupronickel and forty cupronickel-clad-copper commemorative coin series.

On September 15, 2005, the Royal Thai Mint began minting two-baht coins to complete the binary system in Thailand's coinage. That is, each successive denomination is worth twice, or roughly twice, as much as the previous one. Thai coin denominations in general circulation are now 25 satang, 50 satang, 1 baht, 2 baht, 5 baht, and 10 baht.

Recent statistics show that the one-baht coins constitute about 60% of the total coin circulation in the Thai economy. According to the Treasury Department, the issuance of the two-baht coins will solve the overwhelming demand for the one-baht coins as the two-baht coins now fill the gap between the one- and five-baht coins. This translates into savings in time and materials for the mint. The mint is considering expanding the use of multi-ply plated steel technology to other coin denominations due to volatile base metal prices and rising production costs.

On February 3, 2009, the Royal Thai Mint released the new series two-baht coin, minted in 2008, which uses aluminium bronze in place of the former nickel-clad low-carbon steel.

== 2005-2007 two-baht coin ==
The original two-baht coin was minted 2005-2007, and was the sole two-baht coin in circulation from 2005 until February 3, 2009, when the new design was released. The old design was not removed from circulation.

The obverse was designed by Mrs Phutthachat Arunwet (Thai: พุทธชาติ อรุณเวช), and sculpted by Mr Panya Khamkhen (Thai: ปัญญา คำเคน). The reverse was designed by Mr Chaiyod Soontrapa (Thai: ไชยยศ สุนทราภา), and sculpted by Mr Thammanun Kaeosawang (Thai: ธรรมนูญ แก้วสว่าง). The same designer created the artwork of the reverse on the new two-baht coin, and the artwork is similar, but not identical.

The obverse and reverse used in 2005-2007

== Mintages ==
- 2005 ~ 60,000,000
- 2006 ~ 107,872,500
- 2007 ~ 232,105,100 (old series)
- 2008 ~ 10,004,000 (new series)
- 2009 ~ 50,370 (old series)
- 2009 ~ 244,741,000 (new series)
- 2009 ~ 137,228,000

== Commemorative issues ==
=== Cupronickel coin ===
- Commemoration of Princess Chulabhorn Walailak graduating from Kasetsart University

=== Cupronickel-clad copper coin ===
- Commemoration of the International Year of Youth
- the 13th SEA Games
- Commemoration of the International Year of Trees
- Commemoration of the International Year of Peace
- the 5th cycle birthday of King Bhumipol Adulyadej
- Commemoration of Rajamagalapisek Royal Ceremony
- the centenary of Chulachomklao Royal Military Academy
- Commemoration of Princess Chulabhorn Walailak, the researcher princess
- the 72nd anniversary of National Cooperatives
- the 36th anniversary of Crown Prince Vajiralongkorn
- the centenary of Siriraj Hospital
- the 72nd anniversary of Chulalongkorn University
- the 90th anniversary of Princess Mother Srinagarindra
- the centenary of the Siriraj Pattayakorn School
- the centenary of the Comptroller General's Department
- the 36th anniversary of Princess Sirindhorn
- the centenary of Prince Mahidol Adulyadej
- the 80th anniversary of Thai Scouting
- Commemoration of Princess Mother Srinagarindra for her public health work
- the centenary of the Ministry of Interior
- the centenary of the Ministry of Justice
- Ramon Magsaysay Award: Public Service to Princess Sirindhorn
- the 60th anniversary of the National Assembly of Thailand
- the 5th cycle birthday of the Queen Sirikit
- the centenary of Ministry of Agriculture and Cooperatives
- the 64th anniversary of King Bhumipol Adulyadej at the same age as King Mongkut
- the 50th anniversary of the Bank of Thailand
- the 60th anniversary of the Treasury Department
- the centenary of Thai Teacher Education
- the centenary of the Thai Red Cross Society
- the centenary of the Office of Attorney General
- the centenary of King Prajadhipok
- the 60th anniversary of the Royal Institute
- the 60th anniversary of Thammasat Universary
- the 120th anniversary of the Privy Council and the Council of State
- the centenary of Thai Nursing
- the 50th anniversary of the Food and Agriculture Organization (FAO)
- Commemoration of the Year of ASEAN Environment
- Commemoration of the Year of Thailand's Information Technology
- the 50th anniversary celebrations of the King Bhumibol Adulyadej's accession

== See also ==
- Thai baht
