= BioGaia =

Swedish biotechnology company

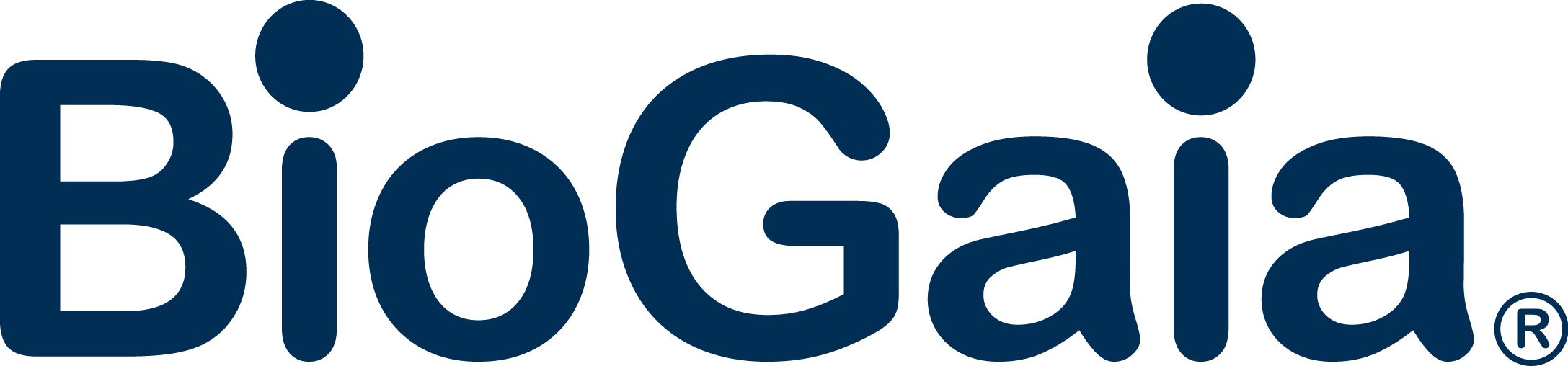
- Company type: Public (Aktiebolag)
- Traded as: Nasdaq Stockholm: BIOG B
- ISIN: SE0017769995
- Industry: Probiotics
- Founded: 1990
- Headquarters: Stockholm, Sweden
- Area served: Worldwide
- Key people: Peter Rothschild (President)
- Products: BioGaia ProTectis drops, BioGaia ProTectis tablets, BioGaia ProTectis D3 drops, BioGaia ProTectis ORS, BioGaia ProDentis lozenges
- Website: http://www.biogaia.com

BioGaia is a Swedish biotechnology company that develops, markets and sells a range of probiotic products. It has patented the use of several Lactobacillus reuteri strains and offers gut and immune health products containing L. reuteri Protectis (DSM 17938). Their oral health products contain L. reuteri Prodentis, a blend of the L. reuteri strains DSM 17938 and ATCC PTA 5289. Products containing L. reuteri have been proven to be both effective and safe in several applications: infant colic, diarrhea prevention and mitigation in children, eradication of H. pylori infection and reduction of side effects from standard H. pylori treatment, amelioration of gingivitis, and general illness prevention in children and adults. BioGaia was ranked 9th in the Top 30 Global Probiotic Food Ingredient Companies list by FoodTalks in 2021. The BioGaia -B share is listed on the NASDAQ OMX Nordic Exchange.

== History ==
BioGaia was founded in 1990 to develop and commercialize a new strain of L. reuteri. The company's research director Dr. Ivan Casas believed that newborn chickens consumed their mothers' feces, allowing the transfer of beneficial microorganisms from the mother to the sterile newborn bird. He believed that the same was true for humans. It is generally accepted that newborn babies are sterile at birth and are very sensitive to pathogenic bacteria before they establish a microbial flora of their own.

This flora should preferably come from their mother. Ivan believed that Lactobacillus reuteri is one of the bacteria that a mother should transfer to her offspring, whether a chicken, a human baby or any other mammal. He wanted to create probiotic products that would confirm this "Circle of Life”.

The first step involved analysis of breast milk from mothers in the United States, Sweden, Israel, South Africa, Denmark, Japan, Peru and South Korea. Approximately 14–15% of the samples contained L. reuteri. In a separate study, Casas found that samples of breast milk collected from women in Andean villages in Peru also contained numerous strains of L. reuteri, which were subsequently isolated.

One of these strains is still used in BioGaia’s probiotic products.
