= Taman Werdhi Budaya Art Centre =

Coordinates: 8.654624474289019°S 115.23395723068286°E

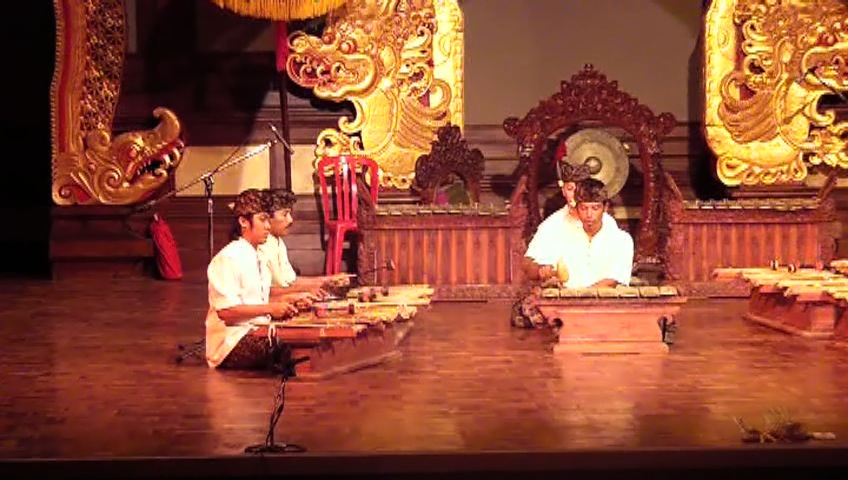
Traditional music performance at Taman Werdhi Budaya Art Centre

The Taman Werdhi Budaya Art Centre is an art and cultural centre in Denpasar, Bali, Indonesia. It serves as a place for art performances, especially traditional Balinese art, dance, music and theatre. It was inaugurated by the Governor of Bali, Ida Bagus Mantra. The five-hectare site consists of art exhibition buildings, an open theater, an indoor theater, a Balinese history library, and a Hindu temple. It is the venue for the annual Bali Arts Festival, a month-long Balinese traditional arts festival since 1979.
