= San Fernando Frog Festival =

Festival in Pampanga, Philippines

The San Fernando Frog Festival takes place in Pampanga in the Philippines.

As part of its aim to preserve the Kapampangan culture, the City of San Fernando, Pampanga organizes the Piestang Tugak to promote the various frog traditions of the province. Events include the paduasan – a frog catching competition using traditional methods, various culinary events featuring Pampanga's unique frog cuisine such as betute or stuffed frog, and the frog olympics – fun games for young people. The festival was conceptualized in 2003 by three Most Outstanding Kapampangan Awardees namely Ivan Anthony Henares (City Tourism Officer, City of San Fernando), Rolan Quiambao (CSFP Arts and Culture Council Chairman), and Robbie Tantingco (Director, Center for Kapampangan Studies)

== Sources ==
- Most Outstanding Kapampangan Awards Program 2005
