= Textile sample =

Small sample piece of material

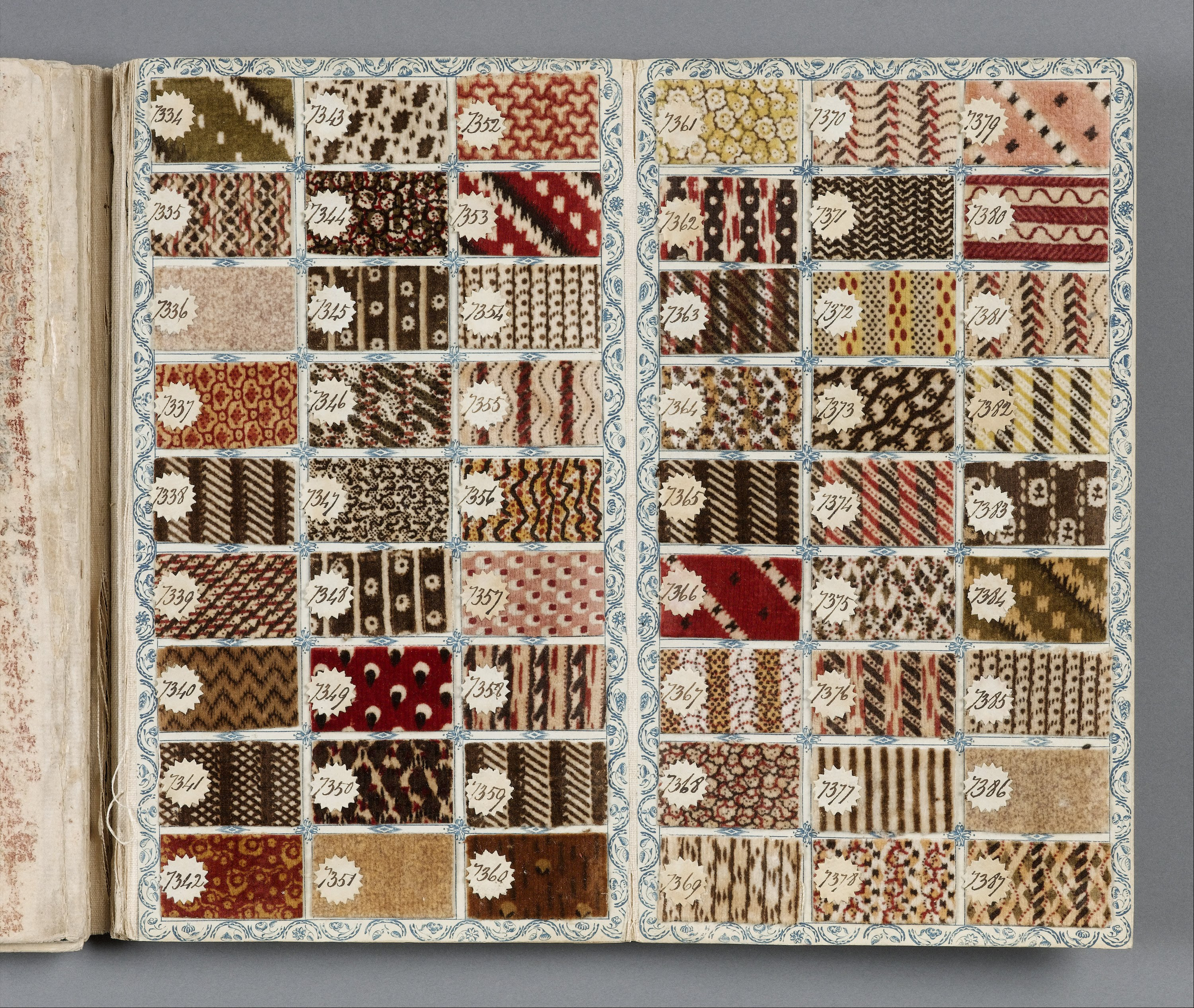
Salesman's sample book showing a number of fabric swatches, 1784. Collection of the Cooper Hewitt, Smithsonian Design Museum.

A textile sample is a piece of cloth or fabric designed to represent a larger whole. A small sample, usually taken from existing fabric, is called a swatch, whilst a larger sample, made as a trial to test print production methods, is called a strike off. For plain-dyed fabrics it is called a lab-dip, and for yarn-dyed fabrics (like stripes and checks), it is called a handloom.

The use of swatches has formed an essential part of the design process of textiles throughout different cultures across history. Samples enable designers to display different types of fabric, demonstrating how different colours, materials, trims and methods of weaving will look in real terms—something that may not be readily apparent from a paper or digital design—before the entire fabric is manufactured.

A textile manufacturer may bring together several swatches of materials into a single sample book, which may serve to enable a salesperson to display a wide selection of fabrics to potential customers in a convenient manner. A textile swatch book may also serve as an internal reference for materials that have been made previously and could be manufactured again.
