= Machig Labdrön =

Tibetan Buddhist teacher

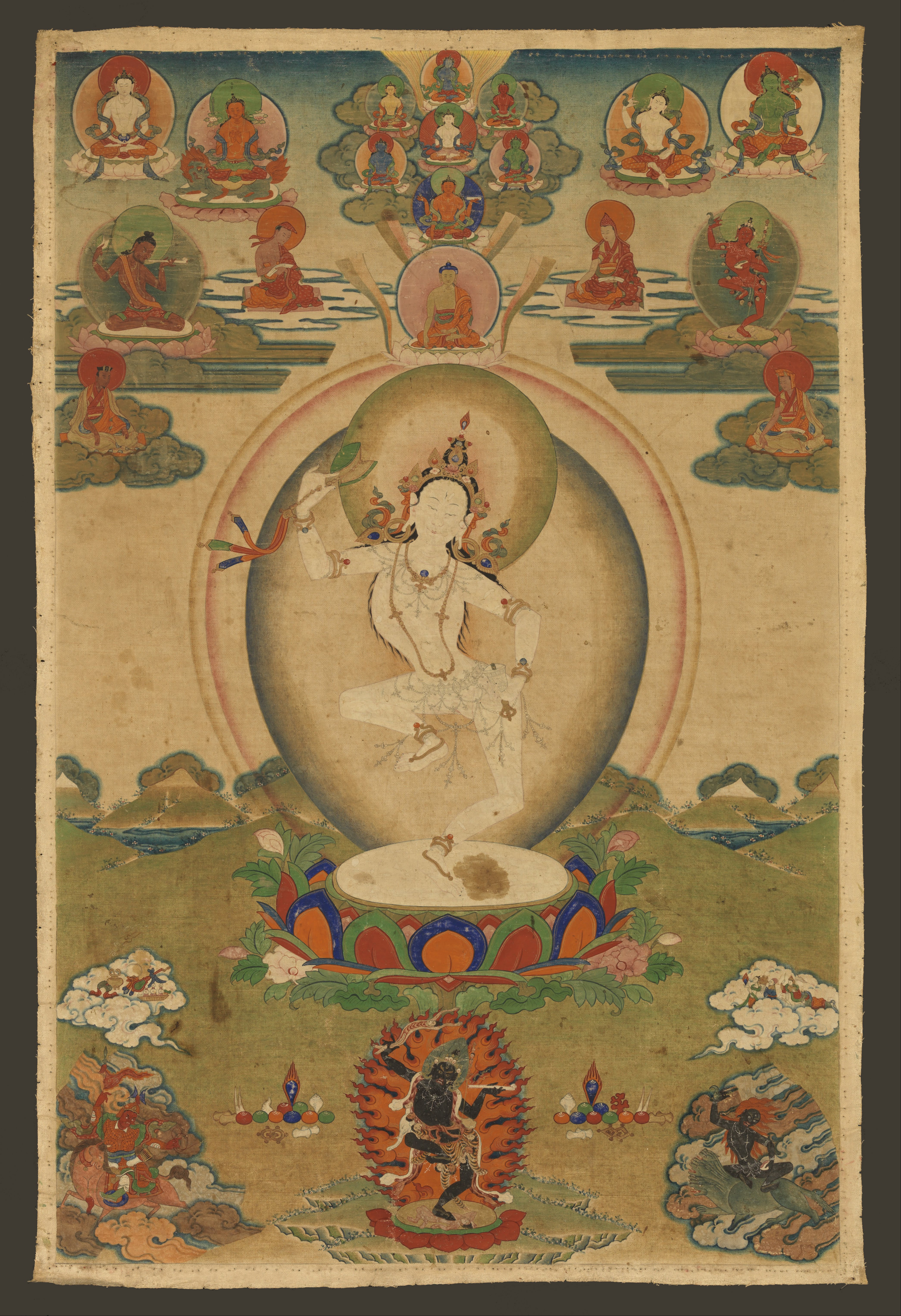
- Machig Labdrön
- Title: Master and Yogini

Personal life
- Born: 1055 Tibet
- Died: 1149 (aged 93–94)
- Children: 3-5

Religious life
- Religion: Tibetan Buddhism
- School: Nyingma
- Lineage: Chöd and Mahamudra

Senior posting
- Reincarnation: Yeshe Tsogyal

Machig Labdrön (Tibetan: མ་གཅིག་ལབ་སྒྲོན་, Wylie: ma gcig lab sgron, sometimes referred to as Ahdrön Chödron, Tibetan: ཨ་སྒྲོན་ཆོས་སྒྲོན་, Wylie: A sgron Chos sgron), or "Singular Mother Torch from Lab" (1055–1149), was a Tibetan Buddhist nun believed to be a reincarnation of Yeshe Tsogyal, and the renowned 11th-century Tibetan tantric Buddhist master and yogini that originated several Tibetan lineages of the Vajrayana practice of Chöd (Tibetan: གཅོད་, Wylie: gcod).

Nyingma scholar Khenchen Palden Sherab Rinpoche states that the Chöd tradition developed by Machig Labdrön is "a radical synthesis of the Prajnaparamita tradition and tantra guru yoga that 'cuts' through the ego."

Historical texts portray Machig Labdrön as the originator of the Chöd lineage which she developed in Tibet. This was confirmed in her own lifetime by Indian Brahmins and others, and Machig Labdron's creation of the Chöd lineage is not doubted by its modern practitioners.

The influences of other practices on Chöd are debated. Some posit Machig Labdron may have come from a Bön family, a position which contradicts historical records. According to Namkhai Norbu, Chöd might be interpreted through combining native shamanism with the Dzogchen teachings. Other Buddhist teachers and scholars offer differing interpretations of the origins of Chöd, and not all of them agree that Chöd has Bön or shamanistic roots.

== Iconography ==
Iconographically, Machig Labdrön is depicted holding a large drum (Skt. damaru), a specific ritual item in the practice of Chöd, in her right hand and a bell (Skt. ghaṇṭa) (Tibetan: དྲིལ་བུ་, Wylie: drilbu) in her left. Her right leg is often lifted and the standing left leg is bent in motion, in a dancing posture. Machig Labdron is depicted as white in color with three eyes and a pleasing countenance. She wears the Six Bone Ornaments of the charnel grounds, and stands on a lotus. Above Machig Labdron is Buddha Shakyamuni and mahasiddhas and the Chöd lineage masters, while specific teachers and lineage holders are on either side. Below her is a tantric deity holding a Chod bone trumpet and swinging skins, while Gesar and a wrathful tantric dakini are on either side.

== Biography ==
=== Names ===
Apart from the name Machig Labdrön used here, the following spellings and transliterations are also found, all referring to the same person:

- Machik Lapkyi Drönma (Wylie: ma gcig lab kyi sgron ma),
- Machig Lapdrönme (Wylie: ma gcig lab sgron ma),
- Machik Labdron (Wylie: ma gcig lab sgron),
- Maji Lab Dran (Wylie: ma gcig lab sgron), and
- Machig Laphyi (Wylie: ma-gcig la-phyi sgron-ma) referring to her place of birth, La-phyi, in the region of Ü-Tsang.
- Machik Labdronma, the often used name by Tibetans

One of Machig Labdrön's teachers, Sönam Lama, gave her the tantric name of Dorje Wangchuma (Wylie: rdo rje dbang phyug ma), which means "Diamond Independent Goddess."

=== Predictions of her birth ===
In the Life of Yeshe Tsogyel, Padmasambhava predicted that Yeshe Tsogyal would be reborn as Machig Labdrön, and her consort, Atsara Sale, would become Topa Bhadra, Machig Labdron's consort. Her assistant and Padmasambhava's secondary consort, Tashi Khyidren, would be reborn as Machig Labdron's daughter, and so on. All of the important figures in Yeshe Tsogyel's life were to be reborn in the life of Machig Labdron, including Padmasambhava himself, who would become Phadampa Sangye.

Tibetan Buddhists believe Machig Labdron was the Mind Stream emanation (tulku) of Yeshe Tsogyal, as well as "an emanation of the 'Great Mother of Wisdom,' Yum Chenmo, (prajnaparamita) and of Arya Tara, who transmitted to her teachings and initiations." Buddhists believe this pattern of reincarnations and emanations continued into the life just before her birth as Machig Labdrön and that in the lifetime before, she was the Indian yogi, Mönlam Drub. After his death, the body of the twenty-year-old Mönlam Drub is said to have remained "alive" in the cave of Potari in South India. According to tradition, it was Mönlam Drub's mindstream which entered the womb of Bum Cham "Great Noble Woman", who lived in the area of Labchi Eli Gangwar in Tibet, which caused the birth of Machig Labdron.

According to one version of Machig Labdron's biography, Machig Labdron's mother experienced auspicious dreams of dakinis shortly after conception, dreams which contained the vase and the conch of the Ashtamangala:

When consciousness entered the womb of the mother on the fifteenth day, she dreamt that four white dakinis carrying four white vases poured water on her head and afterwards she felt purified. Then seven dakinis, red, yellow, green, etc., were around her making offerings, saying "Honor the mother, stay well our mother to be."

After that, a wrathful dark-blue dakini wearing bone ornaments and carrying a hooked knife and a retinue of four blue dakinis carrying hooked knives and skull cups, surrounded her, in front of her, behind her, and to the left and right. All five were in the sky in front of Bum Cham. The central dakini was a forearm's length higher than the rest.

She raised her hooked knife and said to the mother: "Now I will take out this ignorant heart."

She took her knife and plunged it into the mother's heart, took out the heart and put it in the skull cup of the dakini in front of her, and they all ate it. Then the central dakini took a conch which spiraled to the right and blew it. The sound resounded all over the world. In the middle of the conch was a luminous white "A".

She said” “Now I will replace your heart with this white conch shell”...

Even after she woke up, she felt great bliss.

Dreams continued for her mother until the birth and Machig Labdron's sister also had prophetic dreams. Directly before the birth, Machig Labdron instructed her mother on preparations for her swaddling, and Bum Chan also felt the sounds of the reciting syllables "ah" and "ha ri ni sa".

=== Birth and early childhood ===
Machig Labdron's birth in 1055, on the 15th day of the third Tibetan lunar month, was accompanied by auspicious music, rainbow lights, reciting syllables, and with an open third eye. She sat upright immediately, and asked if her mother was well. Her first food was butter.

She was born in a fortressed village called Tsomer in Tamsho, in the Labshi region. Her father was Choyki Dawa, and her mother was Lungmo Bumcam. She had three siblings, and the 16-year-old sister Bumey was present at the birth. The mother decided to guard Machig Labdron from the father, but the father decided to guard her as a family secret. Her elder brother was Shakya Gyaltsen, and another brother was born later.

Machig Labdron began reciting mantra at three years of age, reading at five years, and at eight years of age could quickly recite the Prajnaparamita text "The Perfection of Wisdom in Eight Thousand Verses". Machig Labdron was called "Ahdron" (the Light of Ah) and "Drontse" by the community, and referred to herself as "Rinchen Dronme". The local king gave her the name of Lapdron.

At thirteen years of age, she began studying Buddhism with Geshe Aton alongside her sister, previously ordained as the nun Tontso Rinchen Bum. Her ability in the expositions of Prajanaparamita texts surpassed those of the Geshes and monks. After three years with Geshe Aton, he suggested Machig Labdron move to continue studies of Buddhism with Drapa Ngongshechen in Yoru Dratang, at the Dopthrang monastery, where she moved with her sister and lived as a renunciate after receiving lay practitioner vows and bodhisattva vows. She became Lama Drapa's official reader, and at sixteen years of age participated as a recitation chaplain while reciting the Prajnaparamita Sutras, or 'The Perfection of Wisdom', a Mahayana sutra, for lay people in their homes on behalf of her teacher.

=== Young adulthood ===
The namtar entitled Secret Biography of Machig Labdron relates the struggles that Machig Labdron underwent in order to avoid traditional marriage and eventually leave home to practice Buddhism as her life's calling.

Machig Labdron's early teacher, Drapa Ngongshechen, gave her the reading transmissions for the Many Sutras, the Perfection of Wisdom in One Hundred Thousand Verses, in Twenty-Five Thousand Verses and in Eight Thousand Verses. She assimilated the sutras and commentaries, and realization arose. He asked her to stay for four years, after which he advised her to continue studies with Kyoton Sonam Lama.

With her realizations, Machig Labdron began to cut attachments to places and started to travel and live spontaneously as a yogini, while eating what she found, sleeping wherever, and wearing clothes of a beggar.

When she was twenty years of age, Sonam Lama conferred a series of empowerments on Machig Labdron at a temple in Ei Gangwa, during which her famous ultimate empowerments into the nature of reality from the sambhogakaya occurred. Later, Sonam Lama also conferred tantra, the Five Deities of Varahi, Secret Yoga Mantra, and transmissions which empower explanation, composition, and debate. Sonam Lama gave Machig Labdron the name of Queen of Vajra Space (rdo rje dbyings phyug ma) to match her level of accomplishment.

During the famous empowerment, Arya Tara foretold of a meeting with Indian pandita Topa Bhadra, or Topa Draya (Wylie: thod pa gra ya), an emanation of the Buddha Kapala.

But before, Machig Labdron met and received teachings from well-known Indian yogi Padampa Sanggye, also known as Dampa Sangye, a reincarnation of Padmasambhava, as foretold. Using esoteric sutra and tantra precepts of the paramitra, he conferred direct mind instructions, the Path of Guru Yoga, blessing empowerments, profound vajrayana Dzogchen practices, and numerous specific and profound empowerments and transmissions. Her realizations increased. Padampa Sanggye revealed both Buddha Shakyamuni and Manjushri predicted Machig Labdron's reincarnation and realizations. The Buddha referred to her by the name "Dronma", and Manjushri wrote, "...She will wander through towns, villages, and valleys, Charnel grounds and hermitages, And her teachings will spread".

Machig Labdron spent three years in central Tibet. While preparing for travels as a recitation chaplain in Echung, she had three prophetic dreams about Topa Bhadra before they met. On her journey, she received a teaching on Interdependent Origination from Red Manjushri.

Machig Labdron and Topa Bhadra met during her recitations and became spiritual consorts, while the prophesies that the union would lead to great benefit for beings were actualized. She was 23 years of age. He was also a Buddhist practitioner that later supported Machig Labdron in her practices. She then lived with him, and received some criticism for disregarding ordinary societal norms that contradicted the radical nature of Chöd. Together, they had two sons and one daughter (or two sons and two daughters, or three sons and two daughters by some accounts).

As a tantra practitioner while developing the Chöd tradition, Machig Labdron practiced with Dampa Sangye as her guru and reincarnation of Padmasambhava, which led to further profound realizations. Machig Labdron also practiced with her spiritual consort Topa Bhadra with whom she raised a family, living on the "red and white essence," according to a prediction given to Machig Labdron by Arya Tara.

Machig Labdron's teachers are also listed as Lama Shamarpa, Lama Beton (possibly the same as Aton), Lama Yartingpa, and Phamtingpa, from which she received vajrayana teachings, Great Completion Dzogchen empowerments and transmissions, and Mahamudra empowerments and transmissions.

=== Motherhood ===
Early in her life, Machig Labdron spent time living primarily in monasteries before cutting attachments to certain places. She was a vajrayana practitioner and realized when she met Topa Bhadra. After their initial union, she and her consort had children which became students and Chod lineage holders.

The exact number of children might be debated. In some sources, her three sons were Nyingpo Drubpa, Drubchung, and Yangdrub. Her two daughters were Kongcham and Lacham. In Sara Harding's translations, an elder son was named Drubpa, and another was named Kongpo Kyab or Drupse, while the youngest child and daughter was Drub Chungma.

Machig Labdron's son Drupse became the monk Tonyon Samdrup (thod-smyon bsam-grub), one of her main successors and a propagator of the Chod lineage. He took monk's vows at the age of 15 from Dampa Sangye after moving to Red House where Machig Labdron's seat was located. Tonyon Samdrup was known as the "Snowman of Shampogang" and began the tradition of black hat-wearing Chod practitioners named "Gangpa".

One of her sons started out as a thief. Machig Labdron was eventually able to bring him to the Dharma and became his teacher: "You may think that Gods are the ones who give you benefits, and Demons cause damage; but it may be the other way round. Those who cause pain teach you to be patient, and those who give you presents may keep you from practising the Dharma. So it depends on their effect on you if they are Gods or Demons," she said.

At the age of 35, prophesies continued to actualize. Machig Labdron showed signs of weariness of cyclic existence, and traveled to see Sonam Lama, Lama Drupa, and Padampa Sanggye. During those visits, she received teachings and empowerments, and prophesies about a move to the Copper Mountain in central Tibet. She also restrengthened her commitments by taking, or re-taking, lay vows and bodisattva vows.

== Machig Labdrön's life as a spiritual master ==
Machig Labdron then returned to living as a renunciate at the age of 37, shaved her head and moved to a cave at Zangri Kangmar in the Copper Mountain. Her students gathered there and a community formed around her seat at the Red House.

Machig Labdron's numerous followers came from Tibet and Nepal, and included lamas, geshes, monks, nuns, kings, queens, ministers, chiefs, and lay people including lepers and beggars. "The reputation of her merit and teachings became known even in India."

At the age of 42, Topa Bhadra brought her younger son, Drupse, and her daughter, Drup Chungma, to the Red House before leaving for India. Both were already practicing and accomplishing sadhanas. Machig Labdron cured Drupse from an illness before he became the monk named Tonyon Samdrup, and the main lineage holder of Chod.

During Machig Labdrön's lifetime, Buddhist teachings which came from India to Tibet were considered authentic, and it was believed there were no teachings that originated in Tibet for Indian Buddhist practitioners. As one of Machig Labdron's biographies states:

All the Dharmas originated in India

And later spread to Tibet
Only Machig's teaching, born in Tibet,

Was later introduced in India and practiced there.

As a result, there was so much controversy over Machig Labdrön's teachings, by the time she was 52 years old, that a delegation of acharyas was sent from Bodh Gaya, India to Tibet to assess Machig Labdron's qualifications and teachings, similar to an Inquisition. Her normal crowd of 5,000 students and followers swelled to 500,573 people gathered at Zangri Khangmar, Machig Labdron's seat in Tibet from the age of 37 until her death at the age of 99. As she taught and debated with the acharyas questioning her and her lineage's authenticity, the words were translated into Tibetan, Hindi, and Nepali. In addition, a delegation was sent to South India to find the body of her previous incarnation as Mönlam Drub, and to witness the making of śarīra relics as Machig Labdron instructed. Her predictions actualized, thus adding further validity to her status as a master and lineage holder.

As a result of these and other events, it was determined that Machig Labdron's Chod teachings were indeed authentic, and established that her Chöd teachings were the first Buddhist teachings to emerge in Tibet. One source says, "Word of the widespread practice of Mahāmudra Chö in Tibet and Nepal was first viewed in India with great scepticism. A delegation of āchāryas was sent from Bodh Gayā to Tibet to test Machig Labrön and her teaching resulted in the acceptance of Mahāmudrā Chö as a valid and authentic Mahāyāna tradition. Thereafter, its practice spread even to India."

=== Students ===
Along with her daughter(s) and son(s), prominent among Machig Labdron's students were four main female students who were called Machig Labdrön's Gyen or "Ornaments", and called the "Four Daughters". Their names are Gyaltsen Ne, Sonam Gyaltsen, Palden Gyen, and Bumso Rinchen Gyen. They propagated a distinct Gyen lineage of Chöd, developed from the oral lineage of Chod and the tantric lineage of Vajrayana Chöd.

Many of Machig Labdrön's teachings were given in direct response to the questions of her students.

In addition to her son Tonyon Samdrup, another student named Gyelwa Drubche, or Gyelwa Dondrub, was her heart student and another main lineage holder. Sources state it's unlikely he was her biological son named Drubpa, and state Drubpa married into local royalty and did not practice Buddhism. Kugom Choyki Sengge was also a student and lineage holder that propagated the Chöd teachings.

== Emanations ==
Machig Labdrön stated she accomplished the state of a non-returner, and would emanate instead of reincarnate. She has emanated in Tibet, Bhutan and in the West.

- Jomo Menmo

In Tibet, it is said that Machig Labdrön emanated as Jomo Menmo (1248–1283). According to the information given by the website of the 17th Gyalwang Karmapa Ogyen Trinley Dorje, Jomo Menmo was born as a "karmic emanation" of Yeshe Tsogyal.

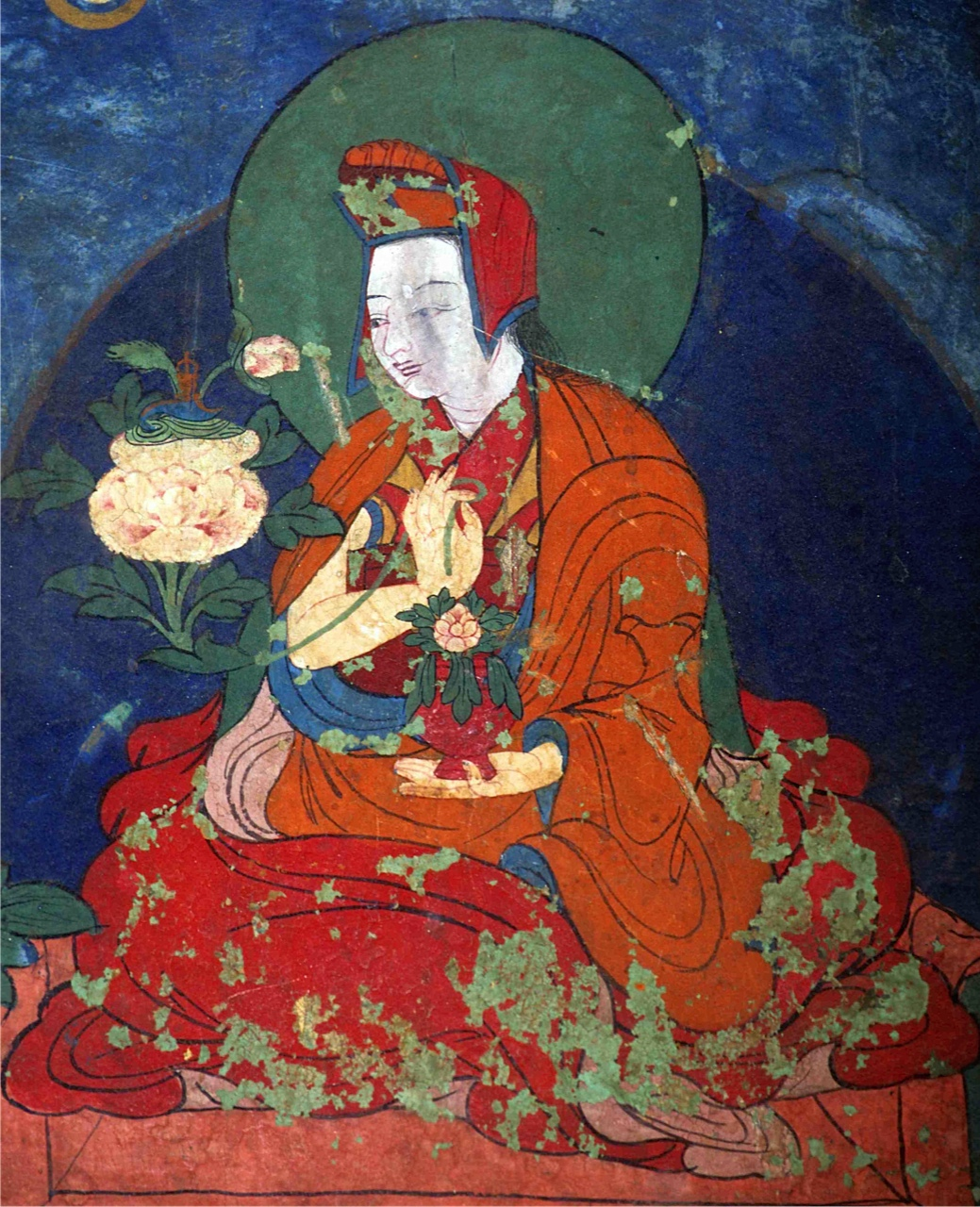
Chökyi Drönma

- Chokyi Dorje

The first Samding Dorje Phagmo, Chökyi Drönma (1422–1455), a female tulku lineage of Vajravārāhī, was understood to be an emanation of Machig Labdrön.

- Shukseb Jetsun Choying Zangmo

In more recent history, in Tibet, the great yogini Shukseb Jetsun Choying Zangmo (1852–1953)—also called Ani Lochen, Lochen Chönyi Zangmo, and Shukseb Jetsun Rinpoche—was a recognized emanation of Machig Labdron. Shuksheb Jetsun reinvigorated the Shuksep gompa (Wylie: shug gseb dgon) of the Kagyü thirty miles from Lhasa on the slopes of Mount Gangri Thökar.

- Khandro Sonam Peldron

In the 12th century, Khandro Sonam Peldron of Wang Dharlung, Bhutan is said to be a main emanation of Machik Labdron. Khandro Sonam was the wife of Phajo Drugom Zhipo of Tibet, who were crucial in the establishment of the Drukpa Lineage of Kagyü in Bhutan. Phajo Drugom Zhigpo was sent to Bhutan by Tsangpa Gyarey Yeshey Dorji of Druk Ralung, Tibet, to establish the Drukpa Lineage in Bhutan. Phajo and Khandro had four sons and a daughter together. The bridge where Phajo and Khandro met in Thimphu still exists today, known as Lungtenzampa. Khandro Sonam Peldron is known to have achieved the supreme enlightenment called Zha lue Phochen and is known to have flown to the heavenly Dali I abode from near Tango monastery in Thimphu.

- Lama Tsultrim Allione

Lama Tsultrim Allione (born 1947), an American Buddhist teacher, was recognized in 2007 as an emanation of Machig Labdrön at Zangri Khangmar, Tibet, the place where Machig Labdrön lived from ages 37 to 99, a from where she passed into the state of non-returner. She was recognized by the resident Rinpoche, Karma Nyitön Kunkhyab Chökyi Dorje, himself a reincarnation of the brother of the 8th Karmapa. Karma Nyitön Kunkhyab Chökyi Dorje asked Lama Tsultrim to sit on the throne, and offered Lama Tsultrim a self-arisen golden crystal kīla or ceremonial dagger, the only remaining tsa tsa (icon) made from the ashes of Machig's body (a mixture of clay and ash imprinted with an image of Machig dancing), texts of Machig's teachings, a hat with symbolic meaning designed by Machig, and various other treasures. Afterwards, Lama Tsultrim Allione was also recognized in Nepal as an emanation of Machig Labdrön by Lama Tshering Wangdu Rinpoche, holder of the lineage of Dampa Sangye.

== Machig Labdrön's Chöd ==
Machig Labdrön's Chöd, also known as Mahamudra Chöd, has been widespread in Tibet since Machig's lifetime. It is also called "The Beggars' Offering" or "The Cutting-Off-Ritual." Chöd is a visionary Buddhist practice of cutting attachment to one's corporeal form (in terms of the dualistic proclivity to relate to one's corporeal form as a reference-point that proves one's existence). This means that a practitioner offers the mandala of their own body in a ganachakra rite. The practitioner works entirely with their own mind, visualizing the offering, and—by practicing in lonely and dreaded places, like cemeteries—works to overcome all fear. This is also why Chöd was often used to overcome sickness in order to heal oneself and others. In some lineages of the Chöd practice, chodpas and chodmas (practitioners of Chöd) use a ritual bell, a specialized drum called a Chöd damaru, and a human thigh-bone trumpet (often obtained from the charnel ground of sky burials).

=== Machig Labdron's Texts ===
The 10 texts on the profound Dharma of Chöd:

- Great Collection of Precepts on Chöd
- The Further Collection
- The Quintessential Collection
- The Appendices
- The Steps of the Crucial Points
- Refutation of Detractors
- The Secret Symbol Dharma
- The Three Cycles of Recitation
- Taking the Ground as the Path
- The Special Esoteric Instructions

=== "Demons" in Machig Labdron's Chöd ===
One of the distinct features of Machig Labdrön's Chöd is the focus on what are sometimes called either demons ('dre) or devils (bdud). It is clear from Machig Labdrön's writings and teachings that the entities being dealt with in Chöd practices are formulations of the human mind, rather than supernatural beings. One of Machig Labdrön's unique contributions to Chöd is her understanding of demons.

As Machig Labdrön explained in answer to the questions of one of her students, Gangpa Muksang,

Son, listen. These are the characteristics of the devils (bdud). That which is called 'devil' is not some actual great big black thing that scares and petrifies whoever sees it. A devil is anything that obstructs the achievement of freedom. ... Most of all, there is no greater devil than this fixation to a self. So until this ego-fixation is cut off, all the devils wait with open mouths. For that reason, you need to exert yourself at a skillful method to sever the devil of ego-fixation.

In another teaching, Machig Labdrön said:

As long as there is an ego, there are demons.

When there is no more ego,

There are no more demons either!

== Pilgrimage sites associated with Machig Labdron and Chöd ==
There are many pilgrimage sites in Tibet associated with Machig Labdrön. Among these are the Tselha Namsum meditation caves near Gyamda in Tibet.

== See also ==
- Emanation
- Incarnation
- Dampa Sangye
- Lineage (Buddhism)
- Women in Buddhism
