= Tsultrim Allione =

American author and teacher (born 1947)

Lama Tsultrim Allione (born Joan Rousmanière Ewing in 1947) is an American author and teacher who has studied and practiced in Tibetan Buddhism's Karma Kagyu lineage as well as in the Nyingma school of Buddhism. She has been recognised by two different Tibetan Buddhist lamas as an emanation (a form of reincarnation) of Machig Labdron, the 11th/12th century CE female founder of several chöd lineages.

== Biography ==
=== Early life and education ===
Allione was born in 1947 in Maine, USA, under the name Joan Rousmanière Ewing.

=== Early Training in Buddhism ===
Allione first traveled to Asia in her teens. In 1969, at the age of 22, she became the first American to be ordained as a Tibetan Buddhist nun by His Holiness the sixteenth Karmapa. This ordination took place in Bodhgaya, India. She received her first ngondro practice from Kalu Rinpoche.

Later, Allione also studied with Apho Rinpoche, Chogyam Trungpa, Chogyal Namkhai Norbu, and other renowned teachers.

=== Recognition ===
In Tibetan Buddhism it is believed that once beings such as Machig Labdrön attain enlightenment, they are no longer subject to the limitation of one body and may emanate into many different dimensions and forms. An emanation continues the work of the original incarnation.

In May and June 2007, Allione led a pilgrimage to Nepal and Tibet which included a visit to Sangri Khangmar (Sangri County) where Machig Labdrön lived from the age of 37 to 99. Here, Allione was recognized as an emanation of Machig Labdrön by the resident Lama, Karma Dorje Rinpoche, the 7th incarnation of the brother of Mikyö Dorje, the 8th Karmapa. Lama Karma Nyitön Kunkhyab Chökyi Dorje offered Allione a self-arisen golden crystal phurba (ceremonial dagger), the only remaining tsa tsa made from the ashes of Machig's body (a mixture of clay and ash imprinted with an image of Machig dancing), texts of Machig's teachings, a hat with symbolic meaning designed by Machig, and various other treasures. Allione was also independently recognised as Machig's emanation in Nepal by Lama Tsering Wangdu Rinpoche, holder of the lineage of Dampa Sangye (who had worked with Machig Labdrön to establish the Chöd practice in Tibet in the 11th Century).

Commenting on this recognition as Machig Labdrön, Lama Tsultrim said she thought the purpose was:

...to make this new phase of collecting Machig's lineage more empowered. Recognition allows more energy to flow, and Machig's blessings can manifest more fully. It's a kind of mirroring from the outside validating our heartfelt intention to reinvigorate and spread Machig's lineage in the West. It also felt very natural. We will keep doing what we have been doing already, but the recognition creates an auspicious interdependence for the teachings.

=== Activities ===
==== Establishing Tara Mandala Retreat Center ====
In 1993, Allione founded the Tara Mandala Buddhist retreat center on 850 acres of land in southwestern Colorado. Currently, the land hosts a temple, dining hall, administrative buildings, and staff housing, and is the host of Buddhist retreats. Allione is the guiding teacher of Tara Mandala and guides thousands of students around the world.

==== Books Published ====
Allione's first book, Women of Wisdom, contains the translated life histories of several accomplished female Tibetan Buddhist practitioners. It was first published in 1984 and was reissued in 2000.

In 2008, Allione's book Feeding Your Demons was published, an approach based on the Chöd lineage of Machig Labdrön that Allione has practiced since 1973. Allione opens chapter five of the book by quoting Carl Jung as saying "One does not become enlightened by imagining figures of light but by making the darkness conscious."

Mark Epstein has described her work as "a book that Carl Jung could only have dreamed of writing." Allione claims that the "process of feeding our demons is a method for bringing our shadow into consciousness and accessing the treasures it holds rather than repressing it."

Allione completed her most recent book, Wisdom Rising: Journey into the Mandala of the Empowered Feminine, which was published by Simon and Schuster in May 2018.

==== Awards ====
In 2009, Allione was selected by an esteemed committee of scholars and practitioners to receive the international “Outstanding Woman in Buddhism” Award given in Bangkok, Thailand.

== Works ==
=== Books ===
- Allione, Tsultrim (2000). Women of Wisdom (2nd ed.). Snow Lion Publications. ISBN 978-1-55939-141-2.
- Allione, Tsultrim (1999). Places She Lives. USA: Penguin. ISBN 0-670-84762-3.
- Allione, Tsultrim (2008). Feeding Your Demons: Ancient Wisdom for Resolving Inner Conflict. Little Brown and Company. ISBN 978-0-316-01313-0.
- Allione, Tsultrim (2018). Wisdom Rising: Journey Into the Mandala of the Empowered Feminine. Simon & Schuster. ISBN 9781501115035

=== Audio ===
- Allione, Tsultrim (2000). Cutting Through Fear. USA: Sounds True Inc. ISBN 978-1-56455-765-0.
- Allione, Tsultrim (2004). The Mandala of the Enlightened Feminine: Awaken the Wisdom of the Five Dakinis. Sounds True Inc. ISBN 978-1-59179-062-4.
- Allione, Tsultrim (2018) Wisdom Rising: Journey into the Mandala of the Empowered Feminine Audible Audiobook – Unabridged ©2018 Simon and Schuster (P)2018 (Joan E Allione).
- Allione, Tsultrim (2021) The Empowered Feminine: Meditating with the Dakini Mandala. Sounds True. ASIN B08VF89G51.
- Allione, Tsultrim (2021) Befriending Your Demons: A Revolutionary Path for Transforming Your Fears and Difficulties into Allies. Sounds True. ASIN B099SZKWJN.

== See also ==
- Shadow (psychology)
- Chod
- Machig Labdron
