= Sky burial =

Funeral practice

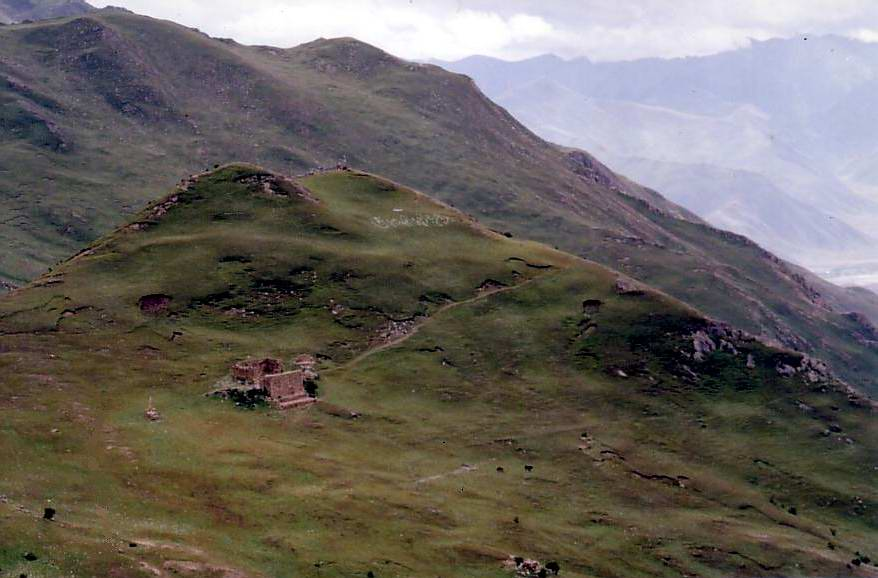
A sky burial site in Yerpa Valley, Tibet

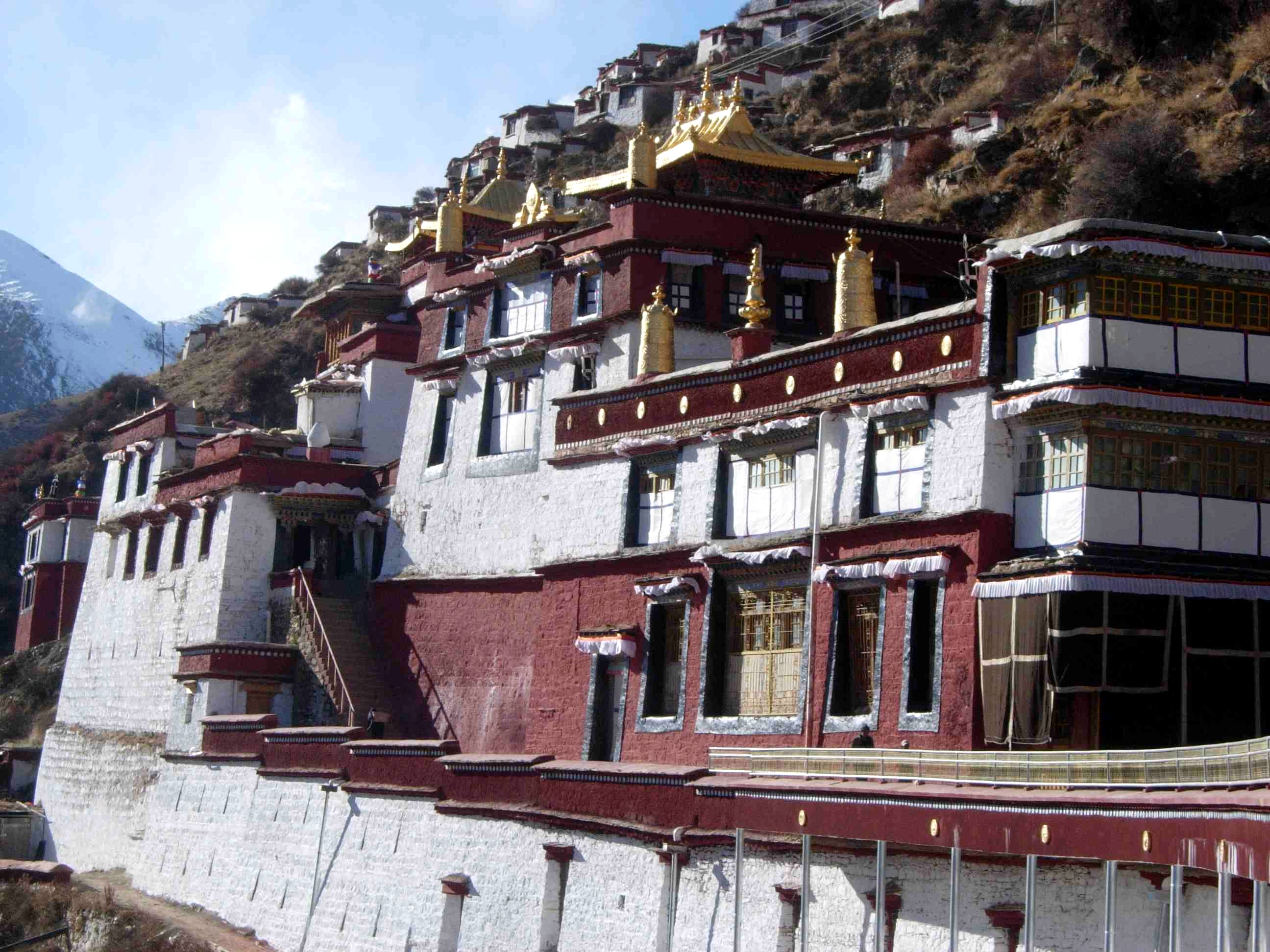
Drigung Monastery, Tibetan monastery famous for performing sky burials

Sky burial (Tibetan: བྱ་གཏོར་, Wylie: bya gtor, lit. "bird-scattered") is a funeral practice in which a corpse is placed on a mountaintop to decompose while exposed to the elements, or to be eaten by scavenging animals, especially crows, vultures, bears and jackals. Comparable excarnation practices are part of Zoroastrian burial rites where deceased are exposed to the elements and scavenger birds on stone structures called Dakhma. Sky burials are endemic to Tibet, Qinghai, Sichuan, and Inner Mongolia, as well as in Mongolia, Nepal, Bhutan, and parts of India such as Sikkim and Zanskar. The locations of preparation and sky burial are understood in the Vajrayana Buddhist traditions as charnel grounds. Few such places remain operational today, as the practice was completely banned during the Cultural Revolution as a superstitious practice; in modern times, the practice is regulated by the Chinese Communist Party due to the ongoing decline of vulture populations.

The majority of Tibetan people and many Mongols adhere to Vajrayana Buddhism, which teaches the transmigration of spirits. In this tradition there is no need to preserve the body, as it becomes an empty vessel upon death. Birds may eat it or nature may cause it to decompose. The function of the sky burial is simply to dispose of the remains in as generous a way as possible (the origin of the practice's Tibetan name). In much of Tibet and Qinghai, the ground is too hard and rocky to dig a grave, and due to the scarcity of fuel and timber, sky burials were typically more practical than the traditional Buddhist practice of cremation, which has been limited to high lamas and some other dignitaries.

Other nations which performed air burial were the Maasai people, Caucasus nations of Georgians, Abkhazians, and Adyghe people, in which they put the corpse in a hollow tree trunk.

== Name ==
"Sky burial" is a Western term; it is not used by Tibetans, who call it "giving alms to the birds" or "to carry to the mountain." The practice may also be referred to as "celestial burial".

== History and development ==
Tibetan sky burials may have evolved from Chöd practices introduced by Dampa Sangye (d. 1117), but other evidence suggests an adoption of non-Buddhist, Zoroastrian practices of defleshing the dead as an animal offering. These practices most likely came out of practical considerations, but they could also be related to more ceremonial practices similar to the suspected sky burial evidence found at Göbekli Tepe (11,500 years before present) and Stonehenge (4,500 years BP). Most of Tibet is above the tree line, and the scarcity of timber makes cremation economically unfeasible. Additionally, subsurface interment is difficult since the active layer is not more than a few centimeters deep, with solid rock or permafrost underlying the surface.

The customs are first recorded in an indigenous 12th-century Buddhist treatise, which is colloquially known as the Book of the Dead (Bardo Thodol). Tibetan tantricism appears to have influenced the procedure. The body is cut up according to instructions given by a lama or adept.

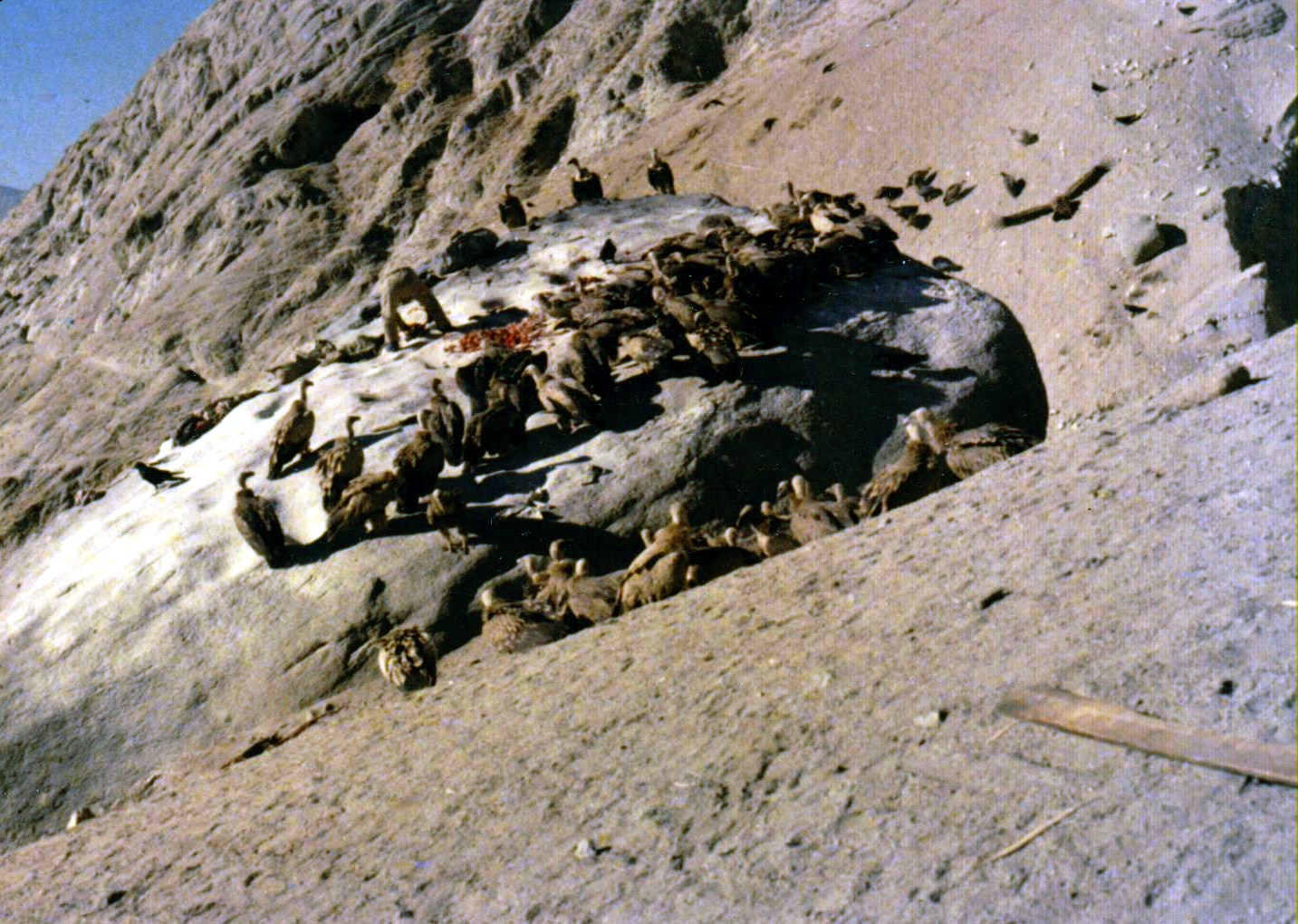
Vultures feeding on cut pieces of body at a 1985 sky burial in Lhasa, Tibet

Mongolians traditionally buried their dead (sometimes with human or animal sacrifice for the wealthier chieftains), but the Tümed adopted sky burial following their conversion to Tibetan Buddhism under Altan Khan during the Ming dynasty. Other banners subsequently converted under the Manchu Qing dynasty.

Sky burial was initially treated as a primitive superstition and sanitation concern by the Communist governments of both the PRC and Mongolia; both states closed many temples, and the practice was banned during the Cultural Revolution, as sky burials were considered among the Four Olds, the umbrella term used by Communists to describe "backwards" customs, cultures and ideas. As a result of these policies, many corpses would simply be buried or thrown in rivers. Many families believed the souls of these people would never escape purgatory and became ghosts. Sky burial nonetheless continued to be practiced in rural areas and has even received official protection in recent years. However, the practice continues to diminish for a number of reasons, including restrictions on its practice near urban areas and diminishing numbers of vultures in rural districts. Finally, Tibetan practice holds that the yak carrying the body to the charnel grounds should be set free, making the rite much more expensive than a service at a crematorium; cremation services cost 680 yuan, with an adult yak worth at least 4000 yuan.

== Purpose and meaning ==
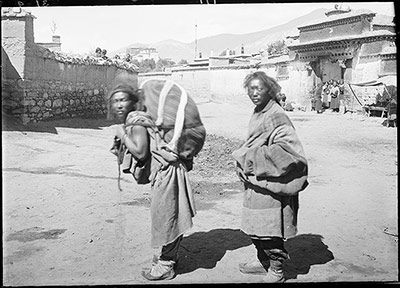
Corpse being carried from Lhasa for sky burial c. 1920

For Tibetan Buddhists, sky burial and cremation are templates of instructional teaching on the impermanence of life. Jhator is considered an act of generosity on the part of the deceased, since the deceased and their surviving relatives are providing food to sustain living beings. Such generosity and compassion for all beings are important virtues in Buddhism.

Although some observers have suggested that jhator is also meant to unite the deceased person with the sky or sacred realm, this does not seem consistent with most of the knowledgeable commentary and eyewitness reports, which indicate that Tibetans believe that at this point life has completely left the body and the body contains nothing more than simple flesh.

Only people who directly know the deceased usually observe it, when the excarnation happens at night.

== Vajrayana iconography ==
The tradition and custom of the jhator afforded traditional Tibetan medicine and thangka iconography with a particular insight into the interior workings of the human body. Pieces of the human skeleton were employed in ritual tools such as the kapala (skullcup) and kangling (thigh-bone trumpet).

The 'symbolic bone ornaments' (Sanskrit: aṣṭhiamudrā; Tibetan: rus pa'i rgyan phyag rgya) are also known as "mudra" or 'seals'. The Hevajra Tantra identifies the Symbolic Bone Ornaments with the Five Wisdoms and Jamgon Kongtrul in his commentary to the Hevajra Tantra explains this further.

== Setting ==
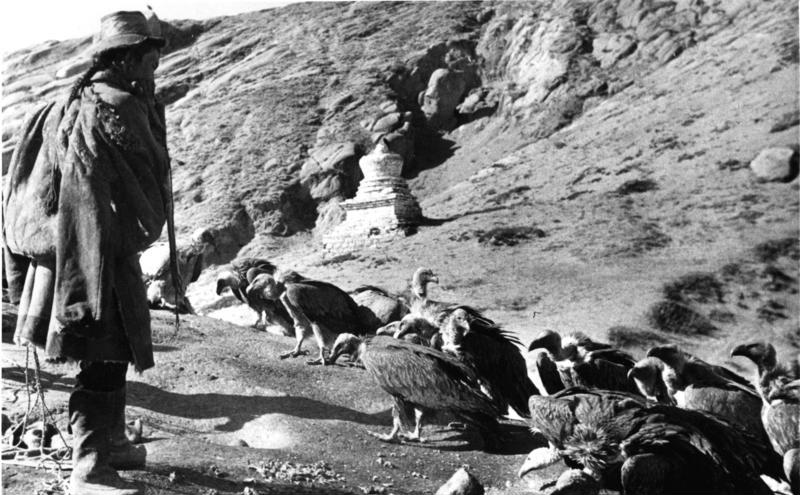
1938 photo of sky burial from the Bundesarchiv

A traditional jhator is performed in specified locations in Tibet (and surrounding areas traditionally occupied by Tibetans). Drigung Monastery is one of the three most important jhator sites.

The procedure takes place on a large flat rock long used for the purpose. The charnel ground (durtro) is always higher than its surroundings. It may be very simple, consisting only of the flat rock, or it may be more elaborate, incorporating temples and stupa (chorten in Tibetan).

Relatives may remain nearby during the jhator, possibly in a place where they cannot see it directly. The jhator usually takes place at dawn.

The full jhator procedure (as described below) is elaborate and expensive. Those who cannot afford it simply place their deceased on a high rock where the body decomposes or is eaten by birds and other animals.

In 2010, a prominent Tibetan incarnate lama, Metrul Tendzin Gyatso, visited the sky burial site near the Larung Gar Buddhist Institute in Sertar County, Sichuan, and was dismayed by its poor condition. With the stated goal of restoring dignity to the dead and creating a better environment for the vultures, the lama subsequently rebuilt and improved the platform where bodies are cut up, adding many statues and other carved features around it, and constructed a large parking lot for the convenience of visitors.

== Procedure ==
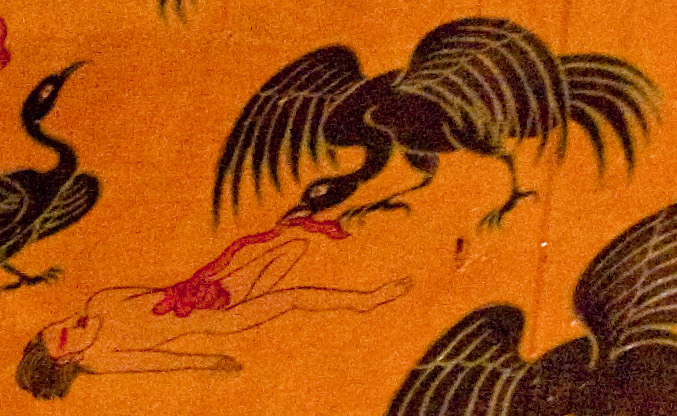
Sky burial art at Litang monastery in Tibet

Accounts from observers vary. The following description is assembled from multiple accounts by observers from the U.S. and Europe.

=== Participants ===
Prior to the procedure, monks may chant mantra around the body and burn juniper incense – although ceremonial activities often take place on the preceding day.

The work of disassembling of the body may be done by a monk, or, more commonly, by rogyapas ("body-breakers"). All the eyewitness accounts remarked on the fact that the rogyapas did not perform their task with gravity or ceremony, but rather talked and laughed as during any other type of physical labor. According to Buddhist teaching, this makes it easier for the soul of the deceased to move on from the uncertain plane between life and death onto the next life. Although there are accounts from participants themselves describing signs of alcoholism to be able to handle the duty.

Some accounts refer to individuals who carry out sky burial rituals as a tokden which is Tibetan for 'master' of the process. While a Tokden has an important role in burial rites, they are often people of low social status and sometimes receive payment from the families of the deceased.

=== Disassembling the body ===
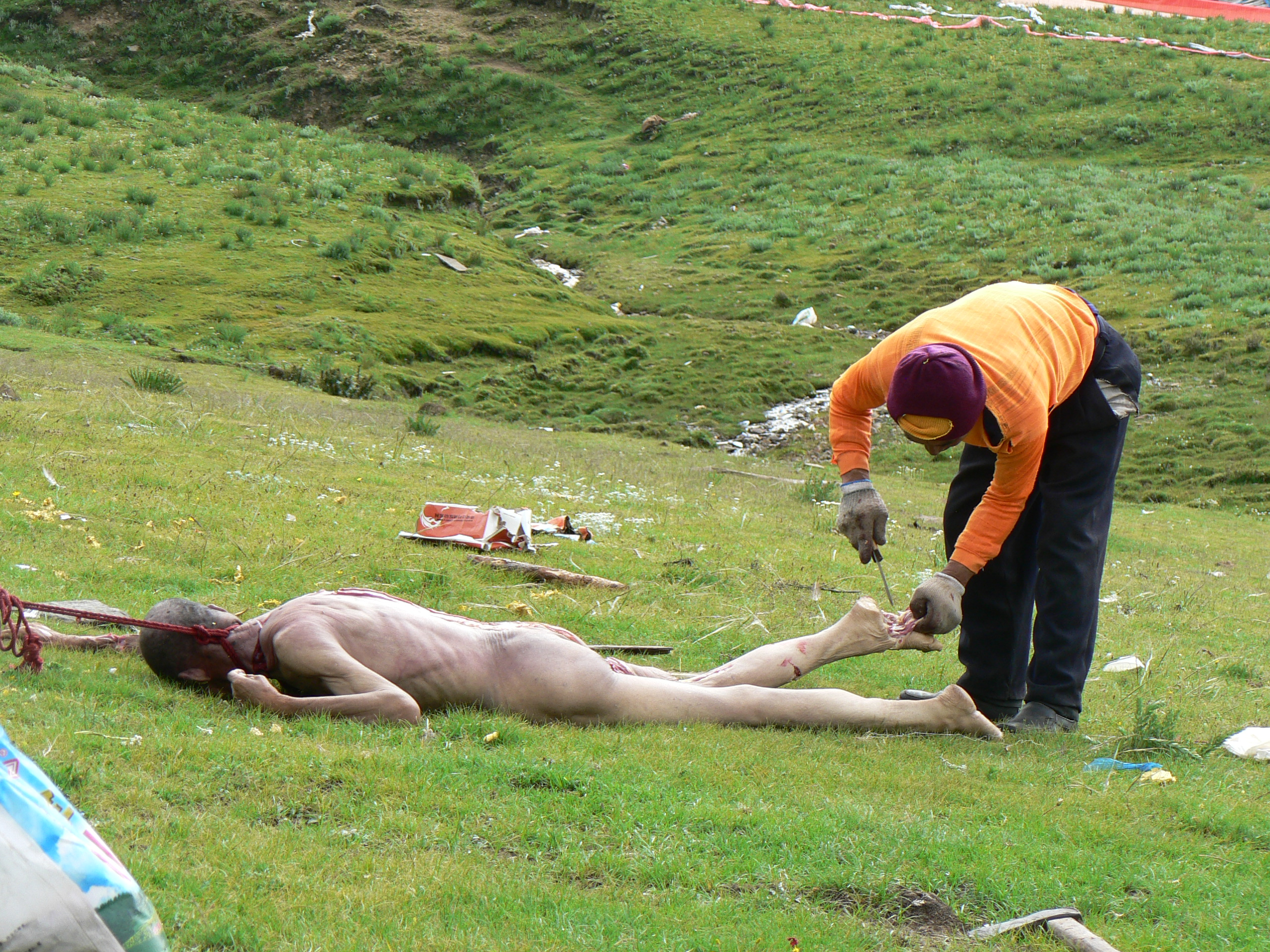
A body being prepared for sky burial in Sichuan

According to most accounts, vultures are given the whole body. Then, when only the bones remain, these are broken up with mallets, ground with tsampa (barley flour with tea and yak butter, or milk) and given to the crows and hawks that have waited for the vultures to depart.

In one account, the leading rogyapa cut off the limbs and hacked the body to pieces, handing each part to his assistants, who used rocks to pound the flesh and bones together to a pulp, which they mixed with tsampa before the vultures were summoned to eat. In some cases, a Tokden will use butcher's tools to divide the body.

Sometimes the internal organs were removed and processed separately (and sold), but they too were consumed by birds. The hair is removed from the head and may be simply thrown away; at Drigung, it seems, at least some hair is kept in a room of the monastery.

None of the eyewitness accounts specify which kind of knife is used in the jhator. One source states that it is a "ritual flaying knife" or trigu (Sanskrit kartika), but another source expresses skepticism, noting that the trigu is considered a woman's tool (whereas rogyapas seem to be exclusively male).

=== Vultures ===
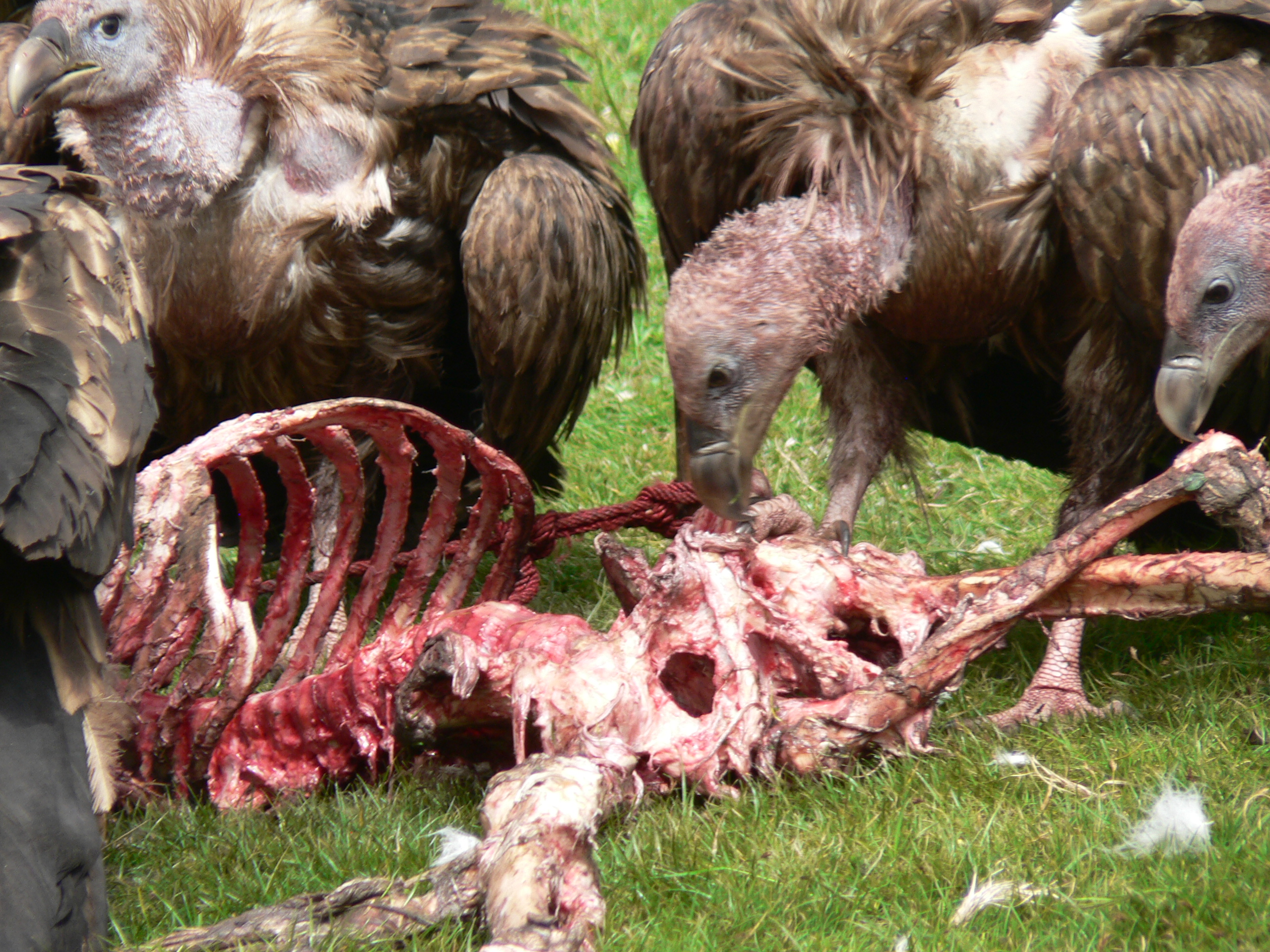
The human skeleton as vultures feed.

The species contributing to the ritual are typically the Himalayan and griffon vultures.

In places where there are several jhator offerings each day, the birds sometimes have to be coaxed to eat, which may be accomplished with a ritual dance. According to Buddhist belief, it is a bad omen if only a small number of vultures come down to eat, if portions of the body are left over after the vultures fly away, or if the body is completely left untouched. Such cases are believed to reflect badly upon the deceased, indicating that they may have lived a bad life or accumulated bad karma, thus predetermining them to a bad rebirth.

In places where fewer bodies are offered, the vultures are more eager, and sometimes have to be fended off with sticks during the initial preparations. Often there is a limit to how many corpses can be consumed at a certain burial site, prompting lamas to find different areas. It is believed that if too many corpses are disposed of in a certain burial site, ghosts may appear.

Not only are vultures an important aspect to celestial burial but also to its habitat's ecology. They contribute to carcass removal and nutrient recycling, as they are scavengers of the land. Due to an alarming drop in their population, in 1988, the Law of the People's Republic of China on the Protection of Wildlife added certain species of vultures into the "rare" or "threatened" categories of their national list of protected wild animals. Local Chinese governments surrounding sky burial locations have established regulations to avoid disturbance of the vultures during these rituals, as well as to not allow individuals who have died due to infectious diseases or toxicosis from receiving a sky burial to prevent compromising the health of the vultures.

== See also ==
- Burial at sea – Method of burial
- Burial tree – Tree or simple structure used for supporting corpses
- Disposal of human corpses – Burial methods
- Tower of Silence – Zoroastrian excarnation structure
