= Chöd =

Buddhist religious practice

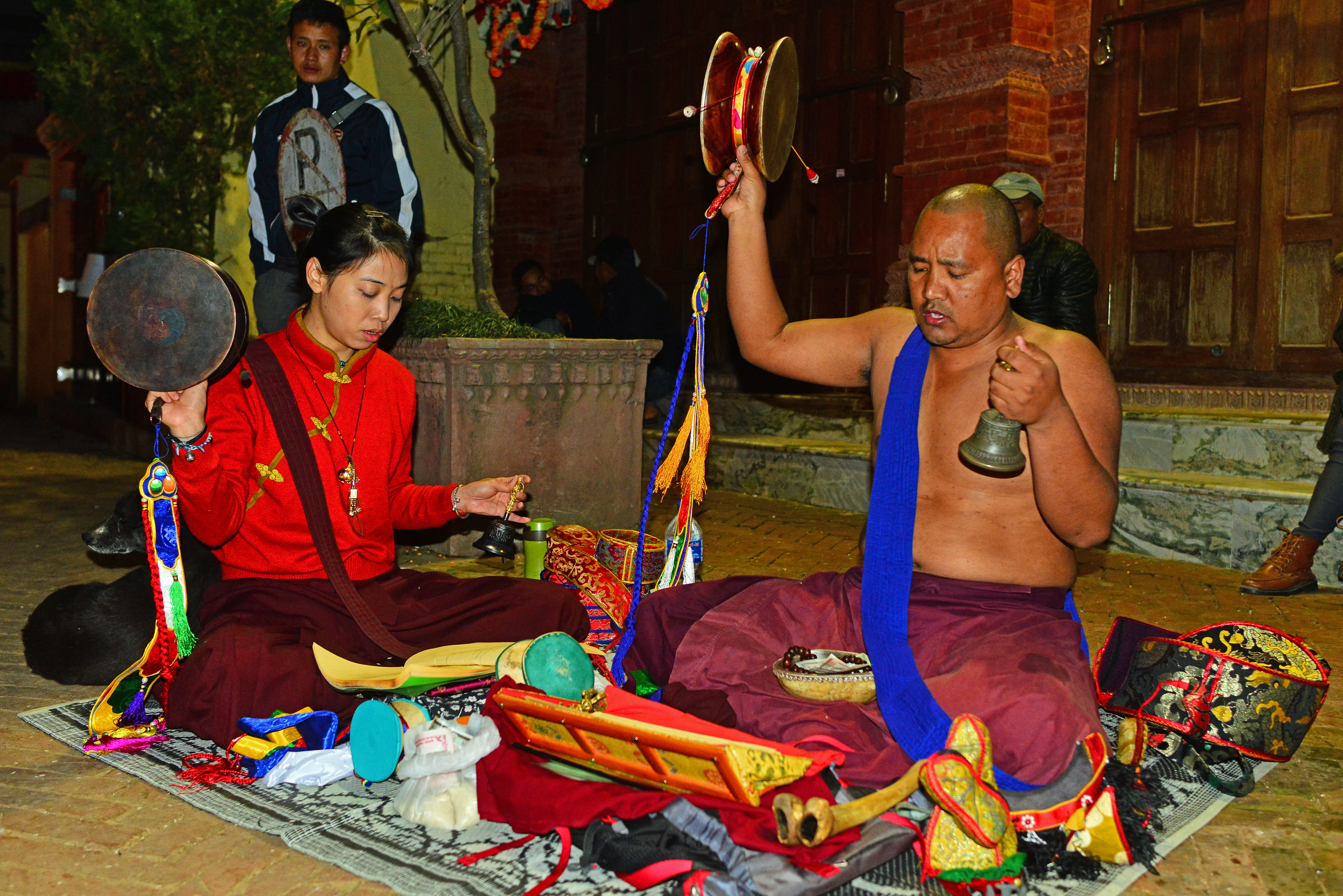
Chöd practitioners at Boudhanath stupa

Chöd (Tibetan: གཅོད, Wylie: gcod lit. 'to sever') is a spiritual practice found primarily in the Yundrung Bön tradition as well as in the Nyingma and Kagyu schools of Tibetan Buddhism (where it is classed as Anuttarayoga Tantra in Kagyu and Anuyoga in Nyingma). Also known as "cutting through the ego," the practices are based on the Prajñāpāramitā or "Perfection of Wisdom" sutras, which expound the "emptiness" concept of Buddhist philosophy.

According to Mahayana Buddhists, emptiness is the ultimate wisdom of understanding that all things lack inherent existence. Chöd combines prajñāpāramitā philosophy with specific meditation methods and tantric ritual. The chod practitioner seeks to tap the power of fear through activities such as rituals set in graveyards, and visualisation of offering their bodies in a tantric feast in order to put their understanding of emptiness to the ultimate test.

== Definition ==
Tibetan: གཅོད་སྒྲུབ་ཐབས་, Wylie: gcod sgrub thabs and Sanskrit chedasādhanā both literally mean "cutting practice". In Standard Tibetan (the prestige dialect associated with Buddhism that is based on the speech of Lhasa), the pronunciation of gcod is [tɕøː].

== Key elements ==
Chöd literally means "cutting through". It cuts through hindrances and obscurations, sometimes called 'demons' or 'gods'. Examples of demons are ignorance, anger and, in particular, the dualism of perceiving the self as inherently meaningful, contrary to the Buddhist doctrine of anatta (non-self). This is done in a powerful meditative ritual which includes "a stunning array of visualizations, song, music, and prayer, it engages every aspect of one’s being and effects a powerful transformation of the interior landscape."

According to Jamgön Kongtrül, chöd involves "accepting willingly what is undesirable, throwing oneself defiantly into unpleasant circumstances, realising that gods and demons are one’s own mind, and ruthlessly severing self-centered arrogance through an understanding of the sameness of self and others."

According to Machig Labdrön, the main goal of chöd is cutting through ego clinging:

What we call devils are not materially existing individuals . . . . A devil means anything which hinders us in our achievement of liberation. Consequently, even kind and loving friends and companions may become devils as far as liberation is concerned. In particular, there is no greater devil than this present ego-clinging, and because of this all the devils will rear their ugly heads as long as one has not severed this clinging to ego.

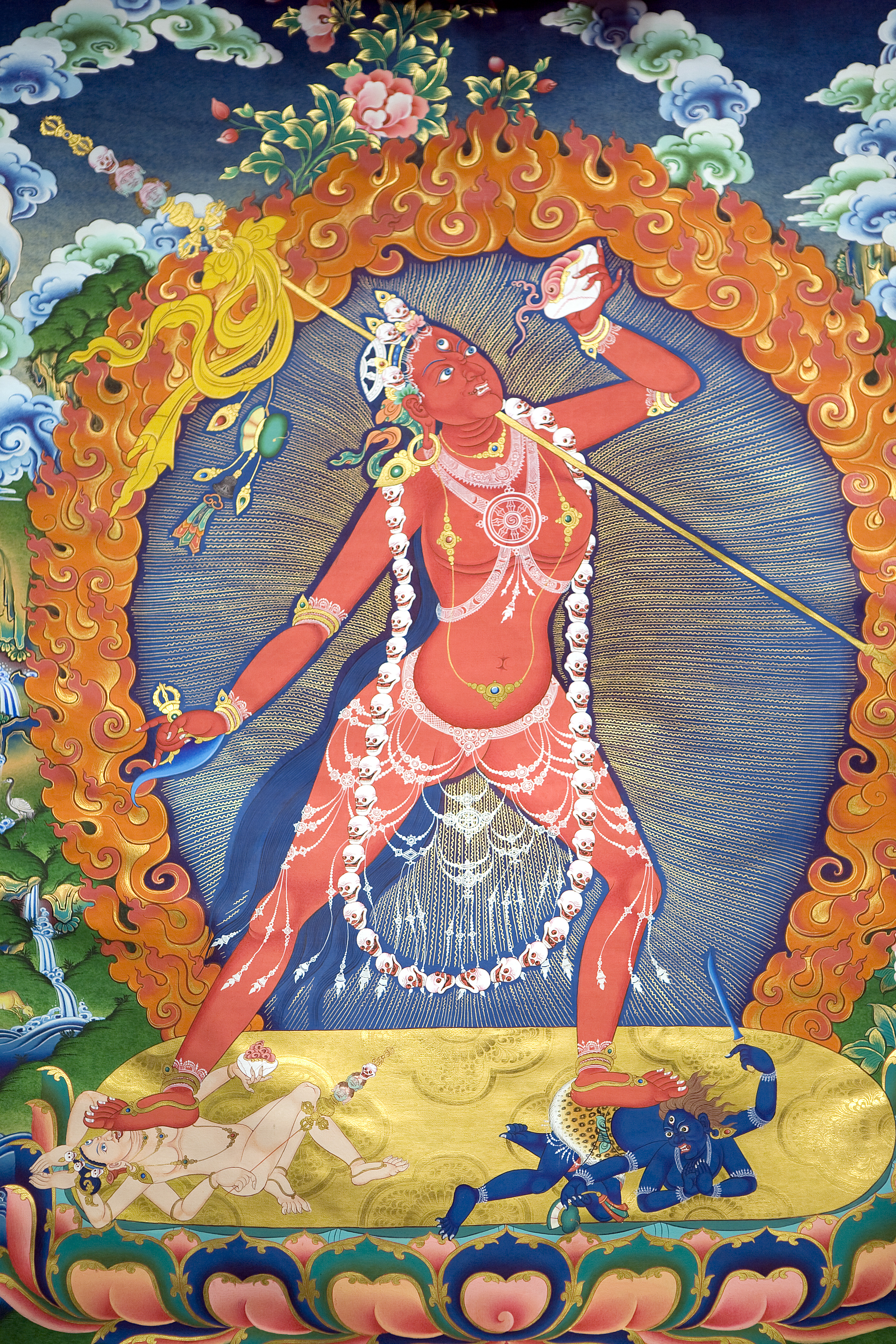
Vajrayogini, an important deity in chöd, with a kartari flaying knife and a kapala "skull cup"

Dzogchen forms of chöd enable the practitioner to maintain rigpa, primordial awareness free from fear. Here, the chöd ritual essentialises elements of phowa, gaṇacakra, pāramitā, lojong, pure illusory body, mandala, brahmavihāra, luminous mind, and tonglen.

In most versions of the sādhanā, the mindstream precipitates into a Saṃbhogakāya simulacrum of Vajrayoginī. In saṃbhogakāya attained through visualization, the sādhaka offers a gaṇachakra of their own physical body to the "four" guests: the Three Jewels, dakinis, dharmapalas and beings of the bhavachakra, the ever-present lokapala and the pretas. The rite may be protracted with separate offerings to each maṇḍala of guests, or significantly abridged. Many versions of the chod sādhana still exist.

Chöd, like all tantric systems, has outer, inner and secret aspects. They are described in an evocation sung to Nyama Paldabum by Milarepa:

External chod is to wander in fearful places where there are deities and demons. Internal chod is to offer one's own body as food to the deities and demons. Ultimate chod is to realize the true nature of the mind and cut through the fine strand of hair of subtle ignorance. I am the yogi who has these three kinds of chod practice.

Vajrayogini is a key figure in the advanced practice of chöd, where she appears in her Kālikā (Wylie: khros ma nag mo) or Vajravārāhī (Wylie: rdo rje phag mo) forms. The practices of Tröma Nagmo "Extremely Wrathful Black Mother" associated with the Dakini Tröma Nagmo (the black form of Vajrayogini) were also propagated by Machig Labdrön. One of the forms of this style of chöd can be found in the Dudjom Tersar lineage.

Chöd is now a staple of the advanced sādhana of Tibetan Buddhism. It is practiced worldwide following dissemination by the Tibetan diaspora.

== Indian antecedents ==
A form of chöd was practiced in India by Buddhist mahāsiddhas prior to the 10th century. The two practices of chöd in Buddhism and in Bön are distinct lineages.

There are two main chöd traditions within Buddhism, the "Mother" and "Father" lineages. Dampa Sangye is known as the "Father of Chöd" and Machig Labdrön, founder of the Mahamudra chöd lineages, as the "Mother of Chöd".

Bön traces the origin of chöd to the Secret Mother Tantra, the seventh of the Nine Vehicles of Bön practice. There are four distinct styles of chöd practice.

Chöd developed outside the monastic system. It was subsequently adopted by the monastic lineages. As an internalization of an outer ritual, chöd involves a form of self-sacrifice: the practitioner visualizes their own body as the offering at a ganachakra. These two qualities are represented iconographically by the victory banner and the ritual knife. The banner symbolizes overcoming obstacles and the knife symbolizes cutting through the ego. The practitioner may cultivate imaginary fearful or painful situations since they help the practitioner's work of cutting through attachment to the self. Machig Labdrön said, "To consider adversity as a friend is the instruction of Chöd".

=== Practitioners as 'mad saints' ===
Sarat Chandra Das, writing at the turn of the 20th century, equated the chöd practitioner (Tibetan: གཅོད་པ, Wylie: gcod pa) with the Indian avadhūta, or "mad saint". Avadhūtas, called nyönpa in Tibetan Buddhism, are renowned for expressing their spiritual understanding through "crazy wisdom" inexplicable to ordinary people. Chöd practitioners are a particularly respected type of mad saint, feared and/or held in awe due to their roles as denizens of the charnel ground. According to tibetologist Jérôme Édou, chod practitioners were often associated with the role of shaman and exorcist.

The Chö[d]pa's very lifestyle on the fringe of society - dwelling in the solitude of burial grounds and haunted places, added to the mad behavior and contact with the world of darkness and mystery - was enough for credulous people to view the chödpa in a role usually attributed to shamans and other exorcists, an assimilation which also happened to medieval European shepherds. Only someone who has visited one of Tibet's charnel fields and witnessed the offering of a corpse to the vultures may be able to understand the full impact of what the chöd tradition refers to as places that inspire terror.

== Iconography ==
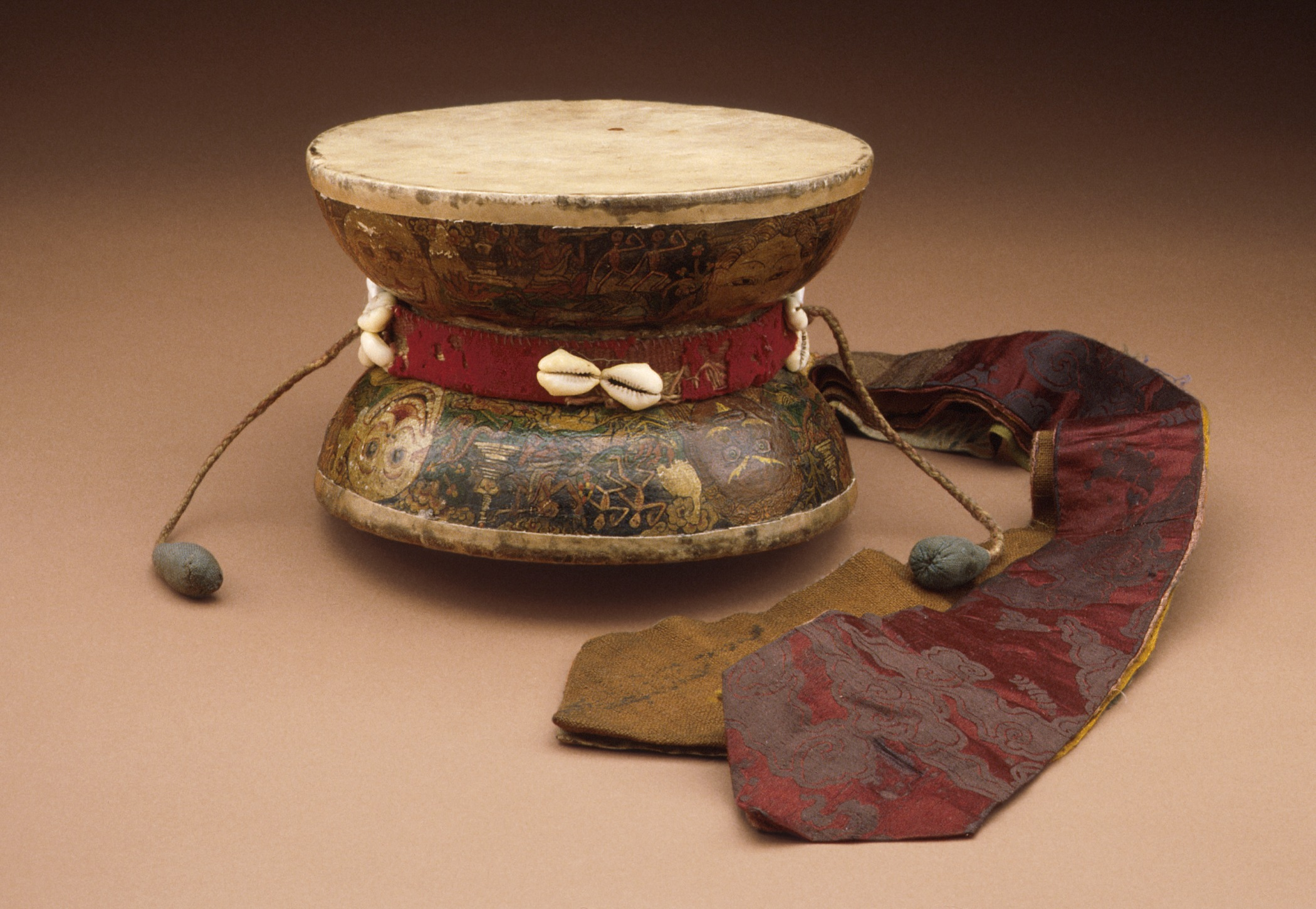
A damaru, a ritual drum

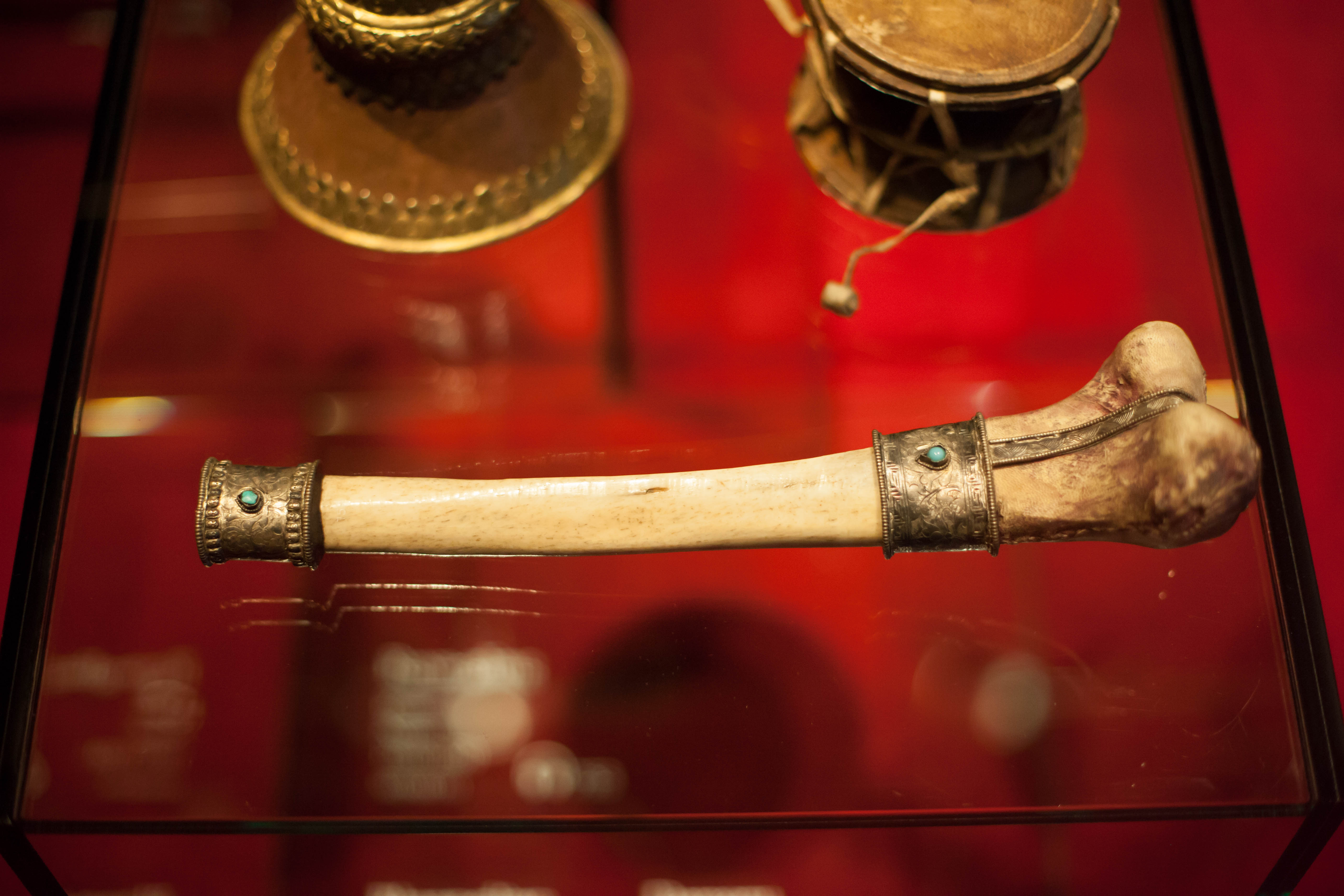
A kangling, a trumpet made out of a human femur

In chöd, the adept symbolically offers the flesh of their body in a form of gaṇacakra or tantric feast. Iconographically, the skin of the practitioner's body may represent surface reality or maya. It is cut from bones that represent the true reality of the mindstream. Commentators have pointed out the similarities between the chöd ritual and the prototypical initiation of a shaman, although one writer identifies an essential difference between the two in that the shaman's initiation is involuntary while a chodpa chooses to undertake the ritual death of a chod ceremony. Traditionally, chöd is regarded as challenging, potentially dangerous and inappropriate for some practitioners.

=== Ritual objects ===
Practitioners of the chöd ritual, chödpa, use a kangling or human thighbone trumpet, a chöd drum, a hand drum similar to but larger than the ḍamaru commonly used in Tibetan ritual, and a bell (ghanta). In a version of the chöd sādhanā of Jigme Lingpa from the Longchen Nyingthig, five ritual knives are employed to demarcate the maṇḍala of the offering and to affix the five wisdoms.

Key to the iconography of chöd is the kartikā (Tibetan: གྲི་གུ,་སྐྱི་གྲི, Wylie: gri gu, skyi gri), a half-moon blade knife for skinning an animal and for scraping hides. The practitioner symbolically uses a kartika to separate the bodymind from the mindstream in ritual.

Kartika imagery in chöd rituals provides the practitioner with an opportunity to realize Buddhist doctrine:

The kartika (Skt.) or curved knife symbolizes the cutting of conventional wisdom by the ultimate insight into emptiness. It is usually present as a pair, together with the skullcup, filled with wisdom nectar. On a more simple level, the skull is a reminder of (our) impermanence. Between the knife and the handle is a makara-head, a mythical monster.

== Origins ==
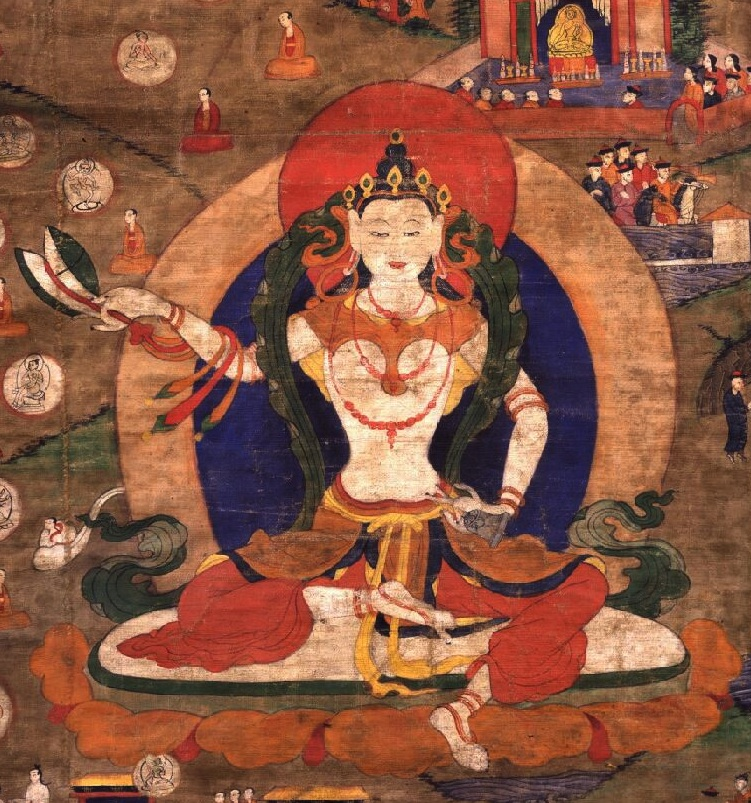
Machig Labdrön

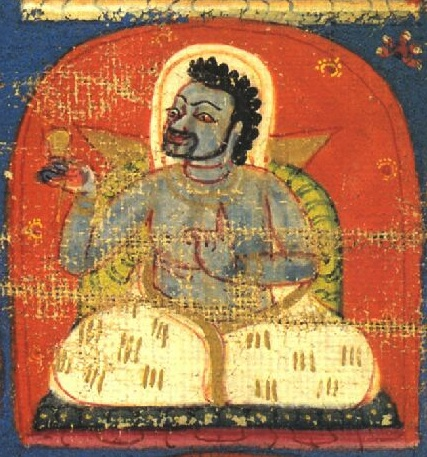
Dampa Sangye

Some sources have described Machig Labdrön as the founder of the practice of chöd. This is accurate in that she is the founder of the Tibetan Buddhist Mahamudrā chöd lineages. Machig Labdrön is credited with providing the name "chöd" and developing unique approaches to the practice. Biographies suggest it was transmitted to her via sources of the mahāsiddha and tantric traditions. She did not found the Dzogchen lineages, although they do recognize her, and she does not appear at all in the Bön chöd lineages. Among the formative influences on Mahamudrā chöd was Dampa Sangye's Pacification of Suffering (Wylie: zhi byed).

=== Transmission to Tibet ===
There are several hagiographic accounts of how chöd came to Tibet. One namtar (spiritual biography) asserts that shortly after Kamalaśīla won his famous debate with Moheyan as to whether Tibet should adopt the "sudden" route to enlightenment or his "gradual" route, Kamalaśīla used the technique of phowa to transfer his mindstream to animate a corpse polluted with contagion in order to safely move the hazard it presented. As the mindstream of Kamalaśīla was otherwise engaged, a mahasiddha by the name of Dampa Sangye came across the vacant kuten ('physical basis') of Kamalaśīla.

Padampa Sangye, was not karmically blessed with an aesthetic corporeal form, and upon finding the very handsome and healthy empty body of Kamalaśīla, which he assumed to be a newly dead fresh corpse, used phowa to transfer his own mindstream into Kamalaśīla's body. Padampa Sangye's mindstream in Kamalaśīla's body continued the ascent to the Himalaya and thereby transmitted the Pacification of Suffering teachings and the Indian form of chöd which contributed to the Mahamudra chöd of Machig Labdrön. The mindstream of Kamalaśīla was unable to return to his own body and so was forced to enter the vacant body of Padampa Sangye.

=== Third Karmapa: systematizer of chöd ===
Chöd was a marginal and peripheral practice, and the chödpas who engaged in it were from outside traditional Tibetan Buddhist and Indian monastic institutions, with a contraindication against all but the most advanced practitioners to go to the charnel grounds to practice. Texts concerning chöd were both exclusive and rare in the early tradition school. Indeed, due to the itinerant and nomadic lifestyles of practitioners, they could carry few texts. Hence they were also known as kusulu or kusulupa, that is, studying texts rarely whilst focusing on meditation and praxis: "The nonconventional attitude of living on the fringe of society kept the chödpas aloof from the wealthy monastic institutions and printing houses. As a result, the original chöd texts and commentaries, often copied by hand, never enjoyed any wide circulation, and many have been lost forever."

Rangjung Dorje, 3rd Karmapa Lama, (1284–1339) was an important systematizer of chöd teachings and significantly assisted in their promulgation within the literary and practice lineages of the Kagyu, Nyingma, and particularly Dzogchen. It is in this transition from the charnel grounds to the monastic institutions of Tibetan Buddhism that the rite of chöd became an inner practice; the charnel ground became an internal imaginal environment. Schaeffer conveys that the Third Karmapa was a systematizer of the chöd developed by Machig Labdrön and lists a number of his works in Tibetan on chöd. Among others, the works include redactions, outlines and commentaries.

Rang byung was renowned as a systematizer of the Gcod teachings developed by Ma gcig lab sgron. His texts on Gcod include the Gcod kyi khrid yig; the Gcod bka' tshoms chen mo'i sa bcad which consists of a topical outline of and commentary on Ma gcig lab sgron's Shes rab kyi pha rol tu phyin pa zab mo gcod kyi man ngag gi gzhung bka' tshoms chen mo ; the Tshogs las yon tan kun 'byung; the lengthy Gcod kyi tshogs las rin po che'i phren ba 'don bsgrigs bltas chog tu bdod pa gcod kyi lugs sor bzhag; the Ma lab sgron la gsol ba 'deb pa'i mgur ma; the Zab mo bdud kyi gcod yil kyi khrid yig, and finally the Gcod kyi nyams len.

== In the West ==
Historicically, chöd was mostly practised outside the Tibetan monastery system by chödpas, who are usually ngakpas (yogis) and ngakmas (yogiṇīs) rather than bhikṣus and bhikṣuṇīs. Because of this, material on chöd has been less widely available to Western readers than some other tantric Buddhist practices.

The first Western reports of chöd came from Alexandra David-Néel, a French adventurer who lived in Tibet. Her travelogue Magic and Mystery in Tibet, published in 1932, contains an account. Walter Evans-Wentz published the first translation of a chöd liturgy in his 1935 book Tibetan Yoga and Secret Doctrines.

Anila Rinchen Palmo translated several essays about chöd in the 1987 collection Cutting Through Ego-Clinging: Commentary on the Practice of Tchod. Since then, Chöd has emerged more into the mainstream of both Western scholarly and academic writings.

== See also ==
- Cham dance – Traditional Buddhist dance
- Sky burial – Funeral practice
- Tibetan tantric practice – Tantric practices in Tibetan Buddhism
- Tsultrim Allione – American author and teacher (born 1947)
