= Gyamda =

Coordinates: 30°01′N 93°08′E

Gyamda (Standard Tibetan: རྒྱ་མདའ; Chinese: 江达) or Ngapo Zampa (Standard Tibetan: ང་ཕོད་ཟམ་ཁ) is a village in modern-day Gongbo'gyamda County of the Tibet Autonomous Region of China on the upper Nyang River at an altitude of 3,200 metres.

The Neu Dechen Gon Monastery sits above the town. It is associated with the teaching of the late Dudjom Rinpoche (1904–1987) who died in France. He was the head of the Nyingmapa school in exile.

Nearby are the Tselha Namsum meditation caves associated with the female yogini Machig Labdrön (1005–1149).

== History ==
In 1587, Gyampo Monastery was established. Subsequently, a town named "Gyamda", meaning "valley outlet of Gyampo", was developed near the monastery. The region was originally under control of Derge Gyalpos. After the Qing dynasty took over Derge, the region was managed by the Tibetan government as Gyamda Dzong. In 1960, Gyamda Dzong merged with West Dengke Dzong (Kongpo region) to form the modern Gongbo'gyamda Dzong.

== See also ==
- List of towns and villages in Tibet
