= Kartika (knife) =

Buddhist ceremonial flaying knife

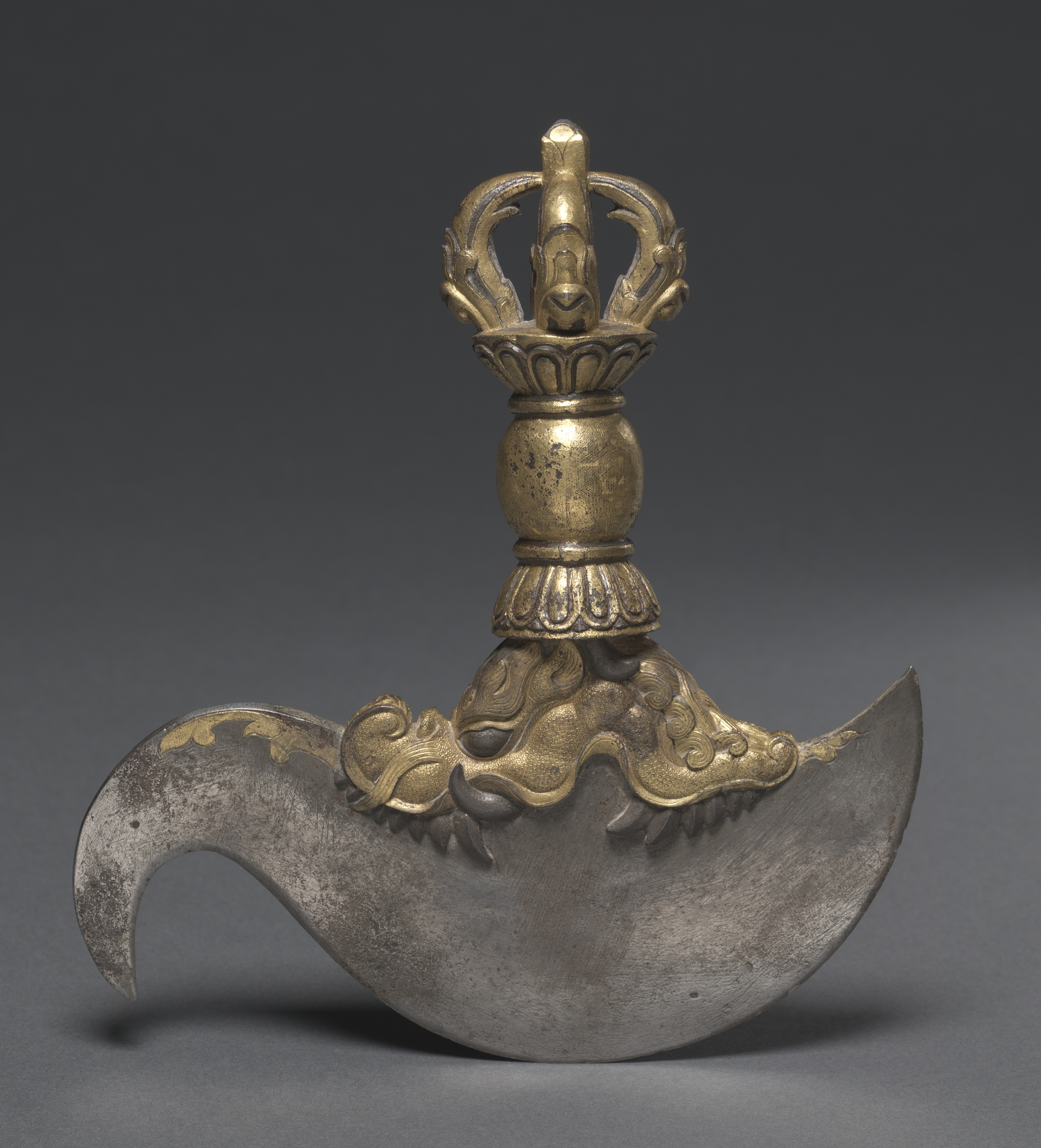
Kartika flaying knife, with vajra handle, made in Beijing in 1407

A kartika or drigug (Sanskrit: kartari; Tibetan: གྲི་གུག་, Wylie: gri-gug, or kartrika in Nepal) is a small, crescent-shaped, hand-held ritual flaying knife used in the tantric ceremonies of Vajrayana Buddhism. The kartari is said to be "one of the quintessential attributes of the wrathful Tantric deities". It is commonly known as the "knife of the dakinis". Its shape is similar to the Inuit ulu or woman's knife, which is used for many things including cleaning skins.

While the kartika is normally held in the right hand of a dakini in Vajrayana iconography and spiritual practice, occasionally it can be seen being held by esoteric male deities, such as certain forms of Yamantaka. It is also found frequently in the iconography of the Tibetan Buddhist spiritual practice of Chöd.

== Iconography ==
In terms of iconography,

The dakini's knife has a flat sharpened blue iron blade with a curved hook at its outer extremity, which enables the flaying activities of cutting, scraping, and pulling. Its faceted or eight-sided handle is attached to the upper edge of the blade by either a leaf-shaped golden mount or the wide-open mouth of a golden makara, and the handle's top is sealed by a half-vajra.

The same way that the bell and vajra are usually paired ritual items in Vajrayana spiritual practice and iconography (one is held in the right hand and the other simultaneously held in the left), the kartika usually appears as a pair with the kapala (skull-cup), symbolizing the union of wisdom (kartika) and method (kapala).

The shape of the kartika or drigug, with its crescent shape and the hook on the end, is derived from the shape of a traditional Indian butcher's knife.

Depictions of Vajrayogini typically contain the kartika as one of her attributes. In the iconography of the enlightened dakinis and tantric female yidams, it is common to find the hooked kartika knife in her right hand and the skull cup in her left, representing "the inseparable union of wisdom and skillful means."

== Meanings ==
As one author writes about the meaning of the kartika:

The traditional interpretation of the hook in Tibetan Buddhist imagery is that of the hook of compassion. It is the hook which pulls beings out of the cycles of transmigration. The hooked crescent-shaped knife of the dakini with its vajra handle pulls one forth from suffering, chops up the ego-centred self and is guided by the diamond clarity of the vajra.

The kartika is used to symbolize the severance of all material and worldly bonds and is often crowned with a vajra, which is said to destroy ignorance, and thus leading to enlightenment. Another more nuanced interpretation says that "the kartika represents the severing of the two Buddhist obscurations of defilements (klesha avarana) and knowledge (jneya avarana) that obstruct the path of enlightenment". The kartika is also used to cut through human obscurations to progress on the spiritual path including "pride, lack of belief, lack of devotion, distraction, inattention, and boredom".

== Gallery ==
Vajra kartari

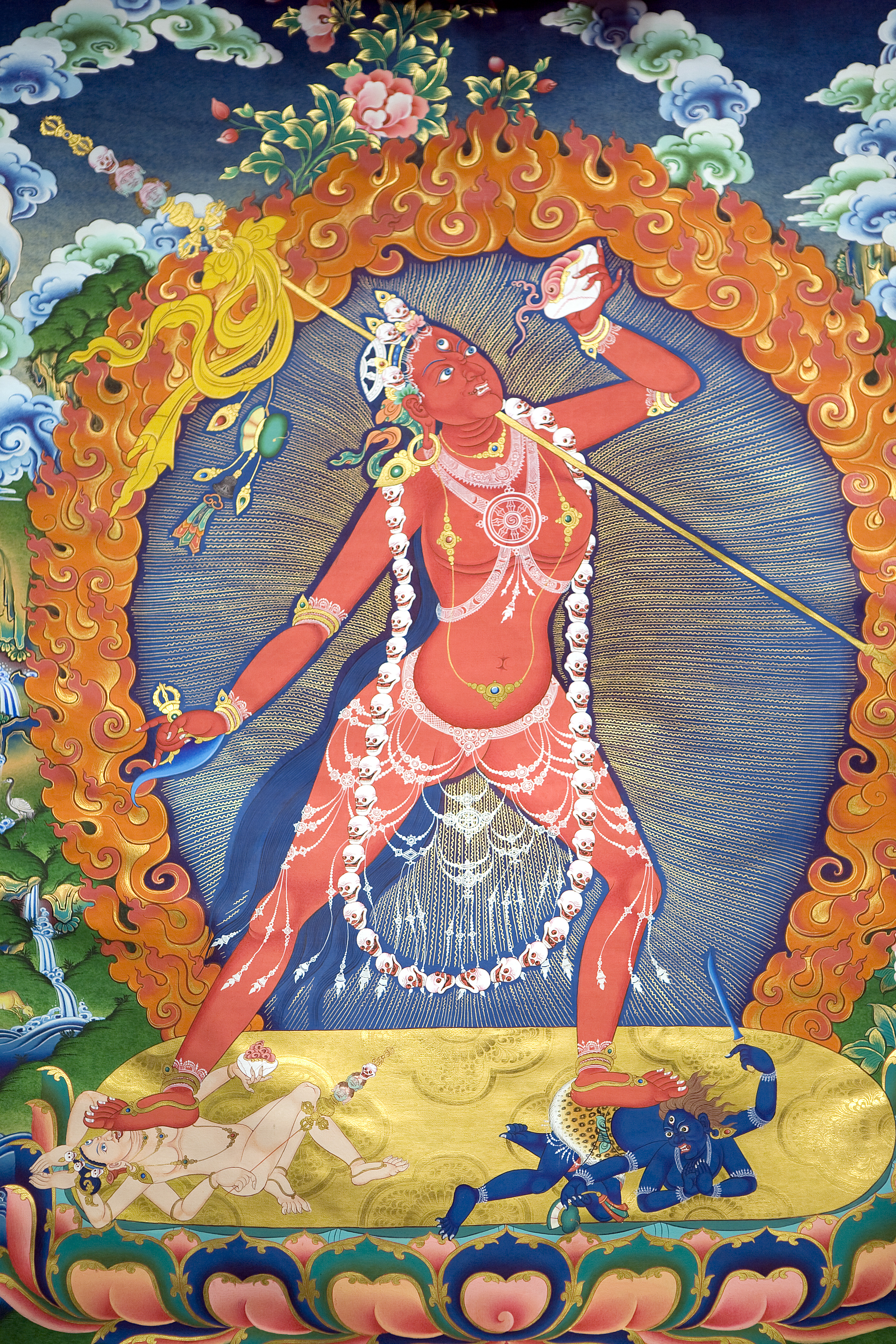
Vajrayogini from thangka, holding kartari in her right hand

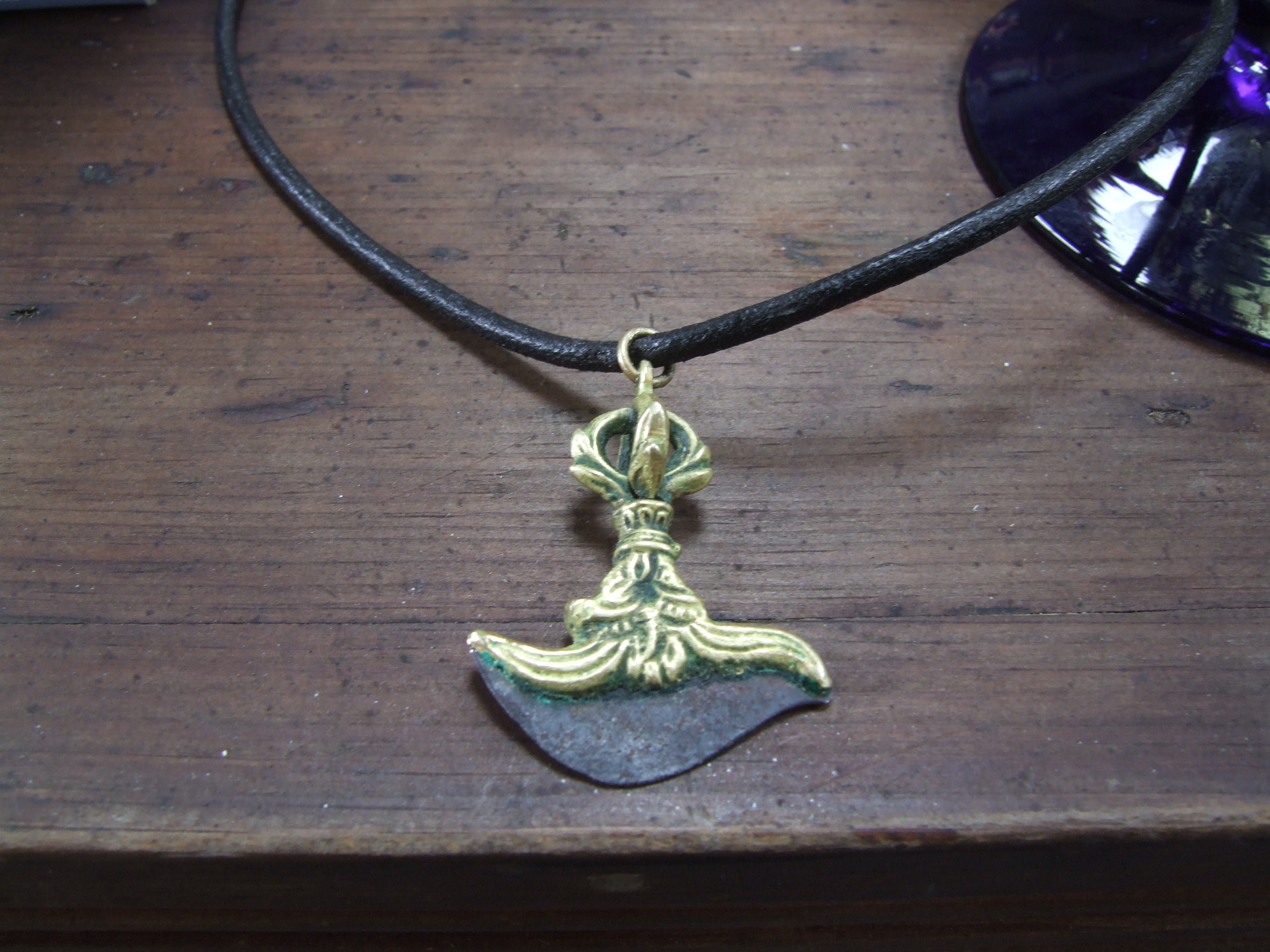
Example of a miniature kartari worn as adornment in contemporary times

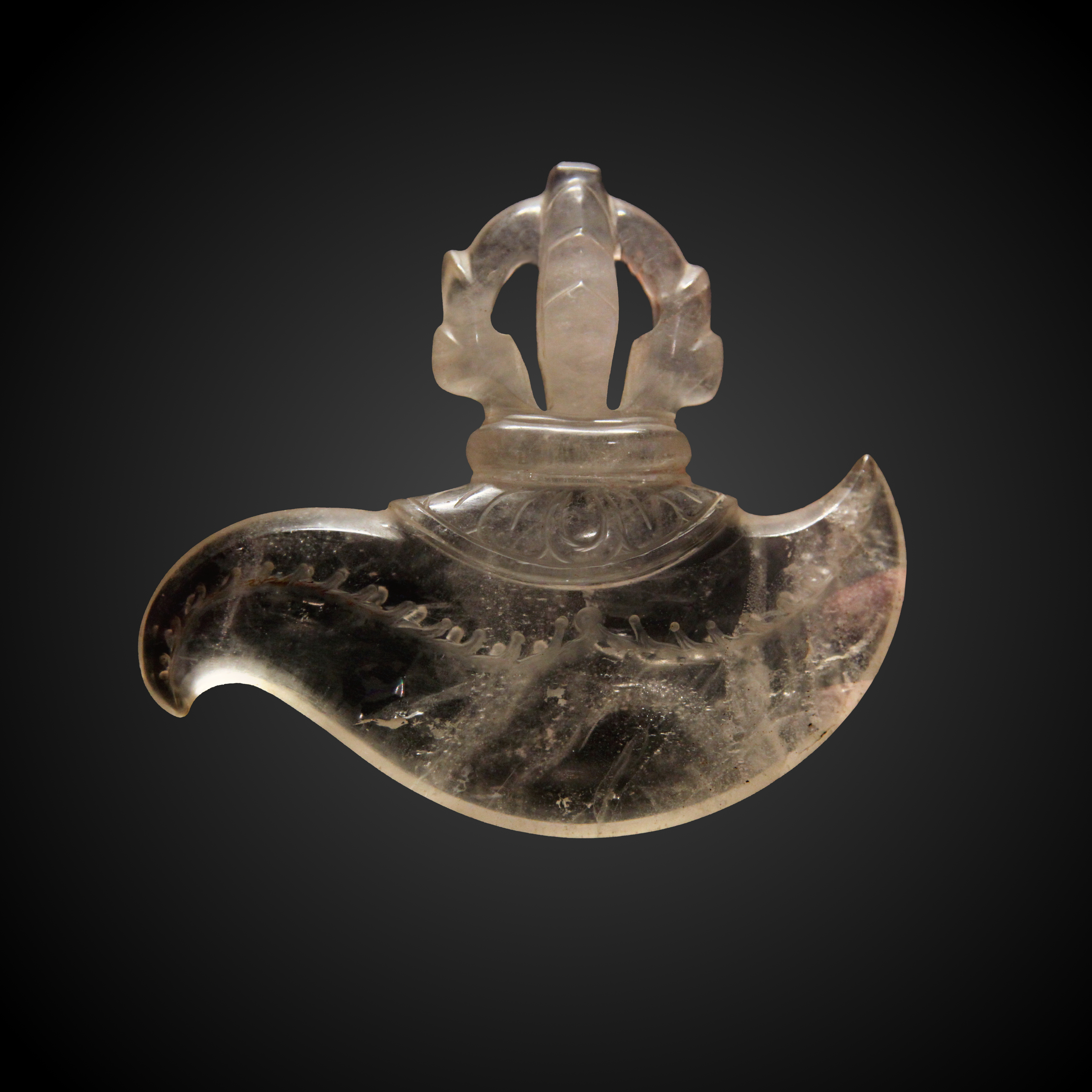
Quartz kartari on display at Guimet Museum, 18-19th century
