= Shukseb Jetsun Chönyi Zangmo =

- Shukseb Jetsunma

Tibetan name
- Tibetan: ཤུགསེཔ་ཇེཙུན་མ་ཆོས་ཉིད་བཟང་མོ
Transcriptions
- Wylie: shugsep jetsun ma chos nyid bzang mo

Shukseb Jetsunma Chönyi Zangmo (1865–1953) was the most well known of the yoginis in the 1900s, and was considered an incarnation of Machig Lapdron. She was the abbess of Shukseb nunnery, and was a Nyingma Tibetan Buddhist teacher. She made the nunnery once again into a center for the special teachings of the Shugseb Kagyu. The nunnery still exists in Tibet today, and in fact is one of its most active nunneries.

== Books and articles ==
1. A full story of Shugsep Jetsun's life is available as “The Story of a Tibetan Yogini: Shungsep [sic] Jetsun 1852-1953” prepared by Kim Yeshi and Acharya Tashi Tsering with the assistance of Sally Davenport and Dorjey Tseten, pp. 130-143, Chö Yang, 1991
2. Shugsep Jetsun, the Story of a Tibetan Yogini Shugsep Jetsun, the story of a Tibetan yogini
3. Havnevik, Hanna. (2005) “Ani Lochen”. Encyclopedia of Religion. Second Edition. Ed. Lindsay Jones. New York: Macmillan. Hanna Havnevik - Department of Culture, Religion, Asian and Middle Eastern Studies
4. Havnevik, Hanna (1999) The Life of Jetsun Lochen Rinpoche (1865-1951) as Told in Her Autobiography. Acta Humaniora, Faculty of Arts, University of Oslo. Dissertation for the degree Dr. philos. 1999.
5. Havnevik, Hanna (1998) “On Pilgrimage for Forty Years in the Himalayas. The Female Lama Jetsun Lochen Rinpoche's (1865-1951) Quest for Sacred Sites.” In Pilgrimage in Tibet. Ed. Alex McKay. Richmond: Curzon Press. (pp. 85-107)
