= Chod =

Chod may refer to:

- Chief of Defence, the highest ranked commissioned officer of a nation's armed forces
- Chöd, a spiritual practice found in certain schools of Tibetan Buddhism
- Chöd drum or chöda, a damaru (drum) used in Hinduism and Tibetan Buddhism
- CHOD-FM, a Canadian radio station
- Chods, inhabitants of the Chodsko ethnographical region in the Czech Republic
  - Chod dialect, spoken in the region
- Ch'od, a fictional character in the Marvel Universe
- Chod, a decrepit vehicle
