= Dampa Sangye =

Buddhist mahasiddha

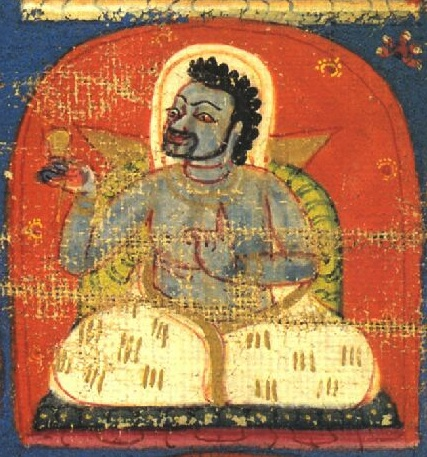
Pha Dampa Sangye

Dampa Sangye (Wylie: dam pa sangs rgyas "Excellent Buddhahood", d.1117, also called "Father Excellent Buddhahood", Wylie: pha dam pa sangs rgyas) was an Indian Buddhist monk of the Indian Tantra movement who transmitted many teachings based on both Sutrayana and Tantrayana to Buddhist practitioners in Tibet in the late 11th century. He travelled to Tibet more than five times. On his third trip from India to Tibet he met Machig Labdrön. Dampa Sangye appears in many of the lineages of Chöd and so in Tibet he is known as the Father of Chod, however perhaps his best known teaching is "the Pacification" (Tibetan: ཞི་བྱེད།, Wylie: zhi byed, THL: Zhijé). This teaching became an element of the Mahamudra Chöd lineages founded by Machig Labdrön.

His Tibetan name translates into Sanskrit as Buddha Paramapitā "Buddha Excellent Father". He often was identified by the descriptive name Nakpopa, "Black One".

== Biography ==
About Dampa Sangye early life, it is written in Tibetan sources that:

Padampa Sangye (known in India as Paramabuddha) was from southern India, and traveled widely in India, Tibet and China, until his death around 1117 AD. It is widely believed that Padampa Sangye was a mindstream 'emanation' (tulku) of the 8th century monk Kamalaśīla, one of the early teachers of the Dharma in Tibet. He spent much time teaching in the Tingri valley, located between Tibet and Nepal, where he founded a monastery.

He was born in the eleventh century and his birthplace has been identified by some scholars as being in modern-day Andhra Pradesh and his father was a jewel merchant by the name of Vīryavarman. At the age of 15 and following his father's death, Dampa Sangye became a monk and studied at Vikramashila in Bihar under a teacher called Kśemadeva. It was here that Dampa familiarised himself with topics like tantra, Mahamudra and the Sutras. He also travelled widely visiting Bodh Gaya and the Kathmandu Valley among others. Traditional sources also state that he visited Tibet up to seven times, and even meditated at Wutai Shan in China where he remained as a teacher up until his death in 1117 CE.

== Legends ==
Some texts report that Padmasambhava was reborn as Dampa Sangye during the life of Machig Labdrön.

Drum khar Nagpopa: Khampa yogi who meditated in dark retreat for 18 years was -according to Keith Dowman- considered to have been the twelfth of Dudjom/Jiktrel Yeshe Dorje's seventeen previous incarnations.

According to Dilgo Khyentse (1910–1991), considered an emanation of Dampa Sangye, the story goes that the great pandit Śāntarakṣita, who was instrumental in transplanting Buddhism from India to Tibet, promised that one of his students would come one day to complete his work. Kamalaśīla (Tib., Padampa Sangye) fulfilled this prophecy. Khyentse Rinpoche in a 1987 gathering of students at Shechen Monastery, his seat in Nepal, offered a commentary on the Hundred Verses of Padampa Sangye.

In the esoteric oral tradition of Tibetan Buddhism, a version of Dampa Sangye's life-story has him traveling to China and teaching there for 12 years, where he was known as Bodhidharma the founder of Zen. Dampa Sangye is associated with the Tingri area of Tibet, where he lived for many years.

Bardok Chusang Rinpoche is recognized as the incarnation Dampa Sangye. He is a married yogi, living in Kathmandu.

There is a morality tale, allegory and teaching story inherent within the transmission of Chöd to Tibet that has been culturally remembered as a Cham dance. In this sacred dance, Moheyan is generally depicted as of ample girth goaded by children. Chöd is a product of both the Indian and Chinese transmissions of Buddhism into the Himalaya For a discussion of the Dunhuang fulcrum of the entwined relationship of Chinese and Indian Buddhism refer van Schaik and Dalton (2004).

For simplicity, the Indian tantric transmission may be characterized as "gradualist", Tibetan: རིམ་གྱིས་འཇུག་པ་, THL: rim gyi jukpa (Chinese: 漸悟; pinyin: jiànwù) and the Chan Buddhism transmission may be characterized as "direct", Tibetan: ཅིག་ཅར་གྱིས་འཇུག་པ་, THL: chikchar gyi jukpa (Chinese: 頓悟; pinyin: dùnwù). It needs to be emphasized that this neat dichotomy in characterization of these two approaches to the Dharma is only valid for the historical context of the great debate between Kamalaśīla and Moheyan arranged by Trisong Detsen and even then it is still open to dialectic. This debate has been named the "Council of Samye" by Giuseppe Tucci and also as the "Bsam yas Debate" or "Council of Lhasa" in English. According to the general Tibetan tradition, the two years of the debate transpired at Samye (Tibetan Bsam yas), a significant distance from Lhasa.

According to the lore of the orthodox, prevailing Tibetan cultural tradition, Kamalaśīla, a mahapandita and scholar educated at Nalanda, advocated the "gradual" process to enlightenment; whereas Moheyan, as a trance and meditation master advocated the "direct" awakening of original mind through the nirodha of discursive thought, the cessation of the mind of ideation. The historicity of this debate has been drawn into question by Gomez (1983) and Ruegg (1992) though this does not lessen its importance in defining the religious and cultural traditions of Tibet. Kamalaśīla was very handsome and a great orator and historically "won" the debate: Though there are conflicting primary sources and secondary accounts.

One hagiography asserts that directly after this debate with Moheyan, as Kamalaśīla was making his way down from the Himalaya to the Indian lowlands, he was incited to enact phowa through compassionate duress, transferring his mindstream to animate a corpse polluted with contagion; and thereby, safely moving the hazard it presented. As the mindstream of Kamalaśīla was otherwise engaged, mahāsidda Dampa Sangye came across the vacant kuten or "physical basis" of Kamalaśīla. Dampa Sangye was not karmically blessed with an aesthetic corporeal form, and upon finding the very handsome and healthy empty body of Kamalaśīla, which he perceived as a newly dead fresh corpse, Dampa Sangye transferred his mindstream into Kamalaśīla's body and left with his new beautiful body. When Kamalaśīla returned to where he had left his body he only found the dark ugly body of Dampa Sangye, which he had no choice but to inhabit. Kamalaśīla's mindstream in Dampa Sangye's body continued the ascent to the Himalaya and thereby transmitted Chöd.

In another version of the previous, it was Dampa Sangye himself who lost his body while animating an elephant corpse, as an Indian adept believed Sangye to be a corpse and took his more beautiful body. Sangye was left with the adept's body, which earned him the nickname of "Little Black One" (nag chung) due to its short stature and dark skin.

== Tingri Hundred (Wylie: ding ri brgya rtsa) ==
Padampa Sangye's last testament to the people of Tingri is known by various names in English 'The Tingri Hundred' or the 'Hundred Verses'. The roman-letter transcription (Wylie) of the Tibetan, along with an English translation, is available on the Internet.
