= Kangling =

Musical instrument

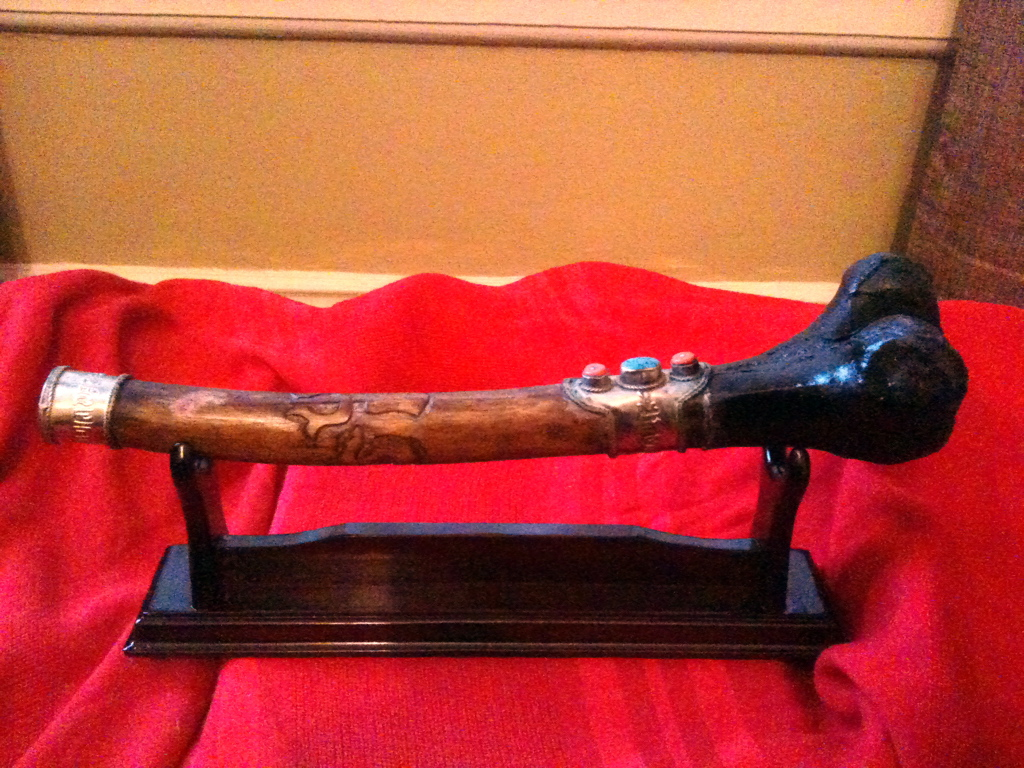

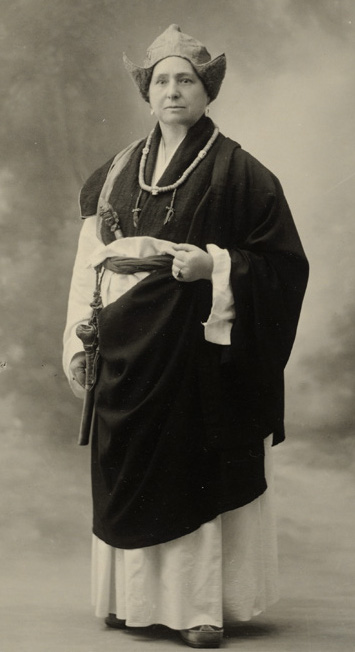
Alexandra David-Neel in 1933 Tibet with a Kangling instrument at her waist

Kangling (Tibetan: རྐང་གླིང, Wylie: rkang-gling), literally translated as "leg" (kang) "flute" (ling), is the Tibetan name for a trumpet or horn made out of a human tibia or femur, used in Tibetan Buddhism for various chöd rituals as well as funerals performed by a chöpa. The leg bone of a deceased person is used. Alternatively, the leg bone of a respected teacher may be used. The kangling may also be made out of wood.

The kangling should only be used in chöd rituals performed outdoors with the chöd damaru and bell. In Tantric chöd practice, the practitioner, motivated by compassion, plays the kangling as a gesture of fearlessness, to summon hungry spirits and demons so that she or he may satisfy their hunger and thereby relieve their sufferings. It is also played as a way of "cutting off of the ego."

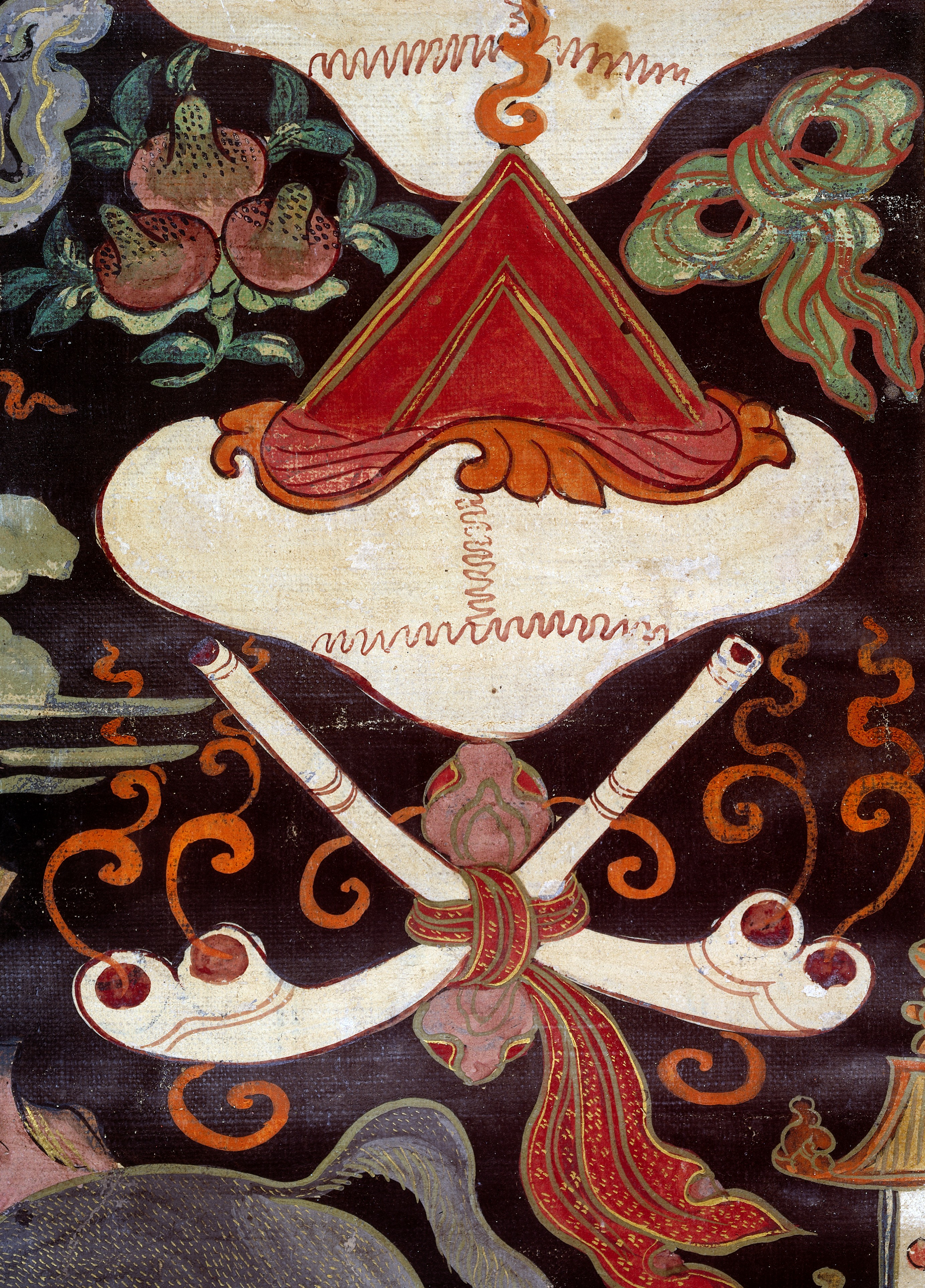
Two shin-bone trumpets and skull cup from a Tibetan banner representing attributes of Palden Lhamo

A minor figure from Katok Monastery, the First Chonyi Gyatso, Chopa Lugu (17th – mid-18th century), is remembered for his "nightly bellowing of bone-trumpet [kangling] and shouting of phet" on pilgrimage, much to the irritation of the business traveler who accompanied him. Chopa Lugu became renowned as "The Chod Yogi Who Split a Cliff in China (rgya nag brag bcad gcod pa)."

== See also ==
- Gyaling
