= Virūpa =

Indian religious teacher of the 9th century

Virūpa, 13th century (Tibet)

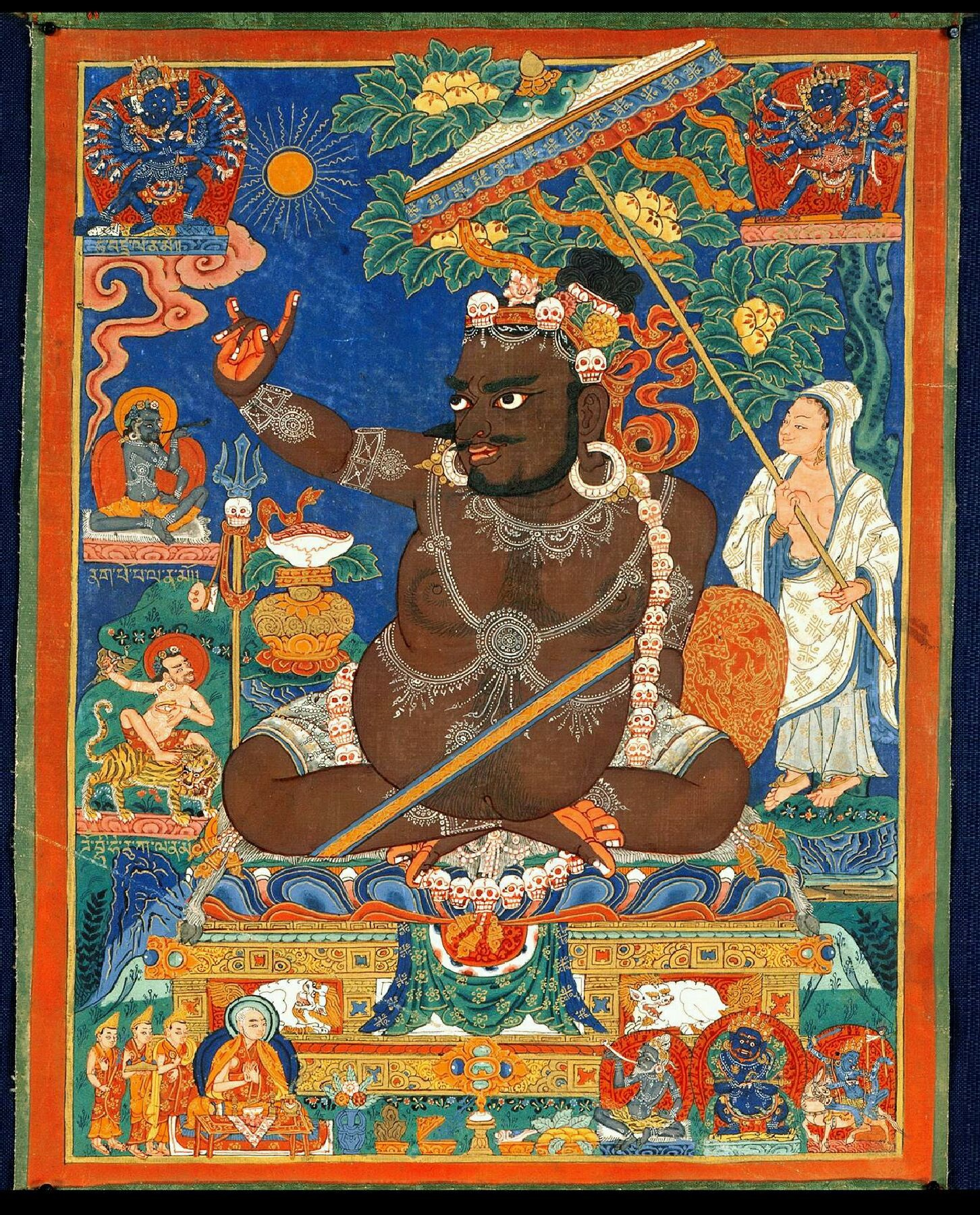
Virūpa, 16th century. It depicts a famous episode in his hagiography when he stopped the sun in the sky.

Virupa (Sanskrit: Virūpa; Tib. bi ru pa or bir wa pa, lit. 'ugly one'), also known as Virupaksa and Tutop Wangchuk, was an 8th–9th century Indian mahasiddha and yogi, and the source of important cycles of teachings in Vajrayana Buddhism.

== Origin of Virupa/Birubapa ==
Virupa is especially known as the source of the Lamdré (Path–Fruit, Skt. mārga–phala) system held by the Sakya school, and is thus seen as the Indian founder of their lineage. The Vajra Verses, pith instructions on the Hevajra tantra, are also attributed to him.

Tibetan sources mention that Virupa was born in Tripura in east India and studied at the Somapura Mahavihara as a monk, practicing tantra, particularly the Cakrasamvara. Alternatively, Indian sources such as the Navanathacaritramu claim that he was born in Maharashtra around the Konkan region to a pious Brahmin couple. The Tibetan historian Taranatha also says that Virupa lived in Maharashtra.

Tibetan sources further state that after years of tantric practice with no results, he gave tantra up, throwing his mala into a toilet. He then had a vision of the deity Nairatmya—who became his main deity—and subsequently received teachings and empowerments from her. He eventually left the monastery and traveled throughout India teaching tantra, performing various magical feats (siddhis) as well as "converting non-Buddhists (tirthikas), destroying their images and stopping their sanguinary rituals."

According to Indologist James Mallinson, a text called the Amṛtasiddhi, which is the earliest text known to teach Hatha yoga techniques, is attributed to Virupa. He also appears as a mahasiddha in various non-Buddhist texts, especially Nath works and Trika Śaiva works like the Virūpākṣapañcāśikā.

== Virupa/Birupa as a preaching guru ==
The Buddhist monk Virubapa contributed the third poem in the list found in the Charyapada manuscript. It is claimed that he flourished during the reign of Devapala, from 810 to 850 A.D. Virubapa was supposed to have been born in the period when Devapala, the third king of the Pala dynasty, thrived. Devapala had succeeded in exerting influence in Bangla, the area adjacent to his kingdom, Tripura; this brought the monk Virubapa into close contact with the Sompura Mohavira at Paharpur, Bogura in Bangladesh—thus, his contact with the lower caste—like ‘Surini’, a lady who earned her living making and selling wines (p.13)—has been documented. The poem relates:

There is one female wine-seller. She enters into two houses. She ferments wine with fine barks (of trees) (ll. 1–2, p. 35).

An English rendering of a larger relevant passage:

The lady of winery produces drunk’s nectar craftily,
And glides herself into the duo-caves gaily.
Ay craftswoman, thou be stable in thy action,
That will harken thou deathless with a physique so strong.
You left a mark on the display door for your sale,
The wine seekers hurried gaily to the door without fail.
The variegated cups were full to the brim to seep,
And the wine chasers relished them to dip down the deep.
The wind laden cup reaches to a lean vain like door,
That Biruwa bewares you to care whence the wine to pour.

The Buddhist Tantrics who revealed the practices of Sahajayana through the songs on various ragas, had several things in common: (a) they accepted the Sahajayana, a reformed form of ‘Mahayana Buddhism’, (b) they chose song as the form of conveying their doctrines, (c) they used the human body as the great metaphor of communion with desire and void, and (d) they used several, specific ragas. These alignments of poetic themes and structures shows that they had somehow close association with each other—historically, geographically, thematically, spiritually—as their way of bodhi marga(attaining knowledge) had to follow a flexible way of seeking the guru, ‘Siddhacharya’, or the guide to be followed by the disciples. Perhaps this approach enabled composers of songs to have a connection with generations of followings and leading.

Dr. Muhammad Sahidullah also reports that Virubapa had for some time visited Paharpur Mohavira and stayed there to preach the theory of ‘Sahajayana’ and Paharpur Mohavira had a reputation as the abode and teaching place for Buddhist monks at the time of the Pala dynasty. This monastery was situated in the northwestern region of Bangladesh that kept close contact with the Tibetan Buddhist monks. Virubapa had a disciple, Dombipa, who is also the writer of the fourteenth song and thus the Buddhist cult of Sahajayana community extends through guru–disciple co-relational practices.

== See also ==
- Tilopa
- Naropa
- Mahasiddha
- Sakya

== Bibliography ==
Tseten, Lama Migmar, The Play of Mahamudra: Spontaneous Teachings on Virupa's Mystical Songs, Wisdom Publications, 2021 (ISBN 978-1-61429-703-1)
