= Hevajra =

Yidam in Tantric or Vajrayana Buddhism

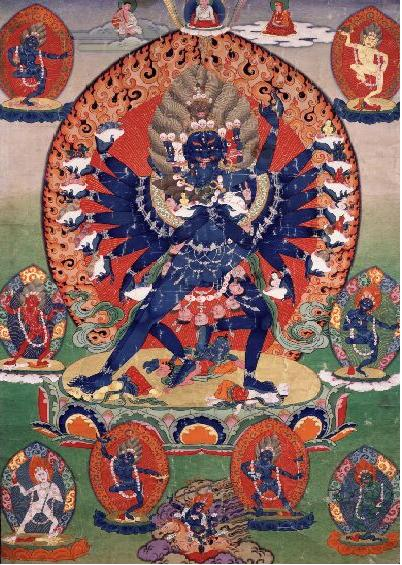
Hevajra and Nairātmyā, surrounded by a retinue of eight ḍākinīs. Marpa transmission.

Hevajra (Sanskrit: हेवज्र; Tibetan: ཀྱེའི་རྡོ་རྗེ་ kye'i rdo rje / kye rdo rje; Chinese: 喜金剛 Xǐ jīngāng / 呼金剛 Hū jīngāng;) is one of the main yidams (enlightened beings) in Tantric, or Vajrayana Buddhism. Hevajra's consort is Nairātmyā (Tibetan: བདག་མེད་མ་ bdag med ma).

== History ==
=== India ===
The Hevajra Tantra, a yoginītantra of the anuttarayogatantra class, is believed to have originated between the late 8th (Snellgrove), and the late 9th or early 10th (Davidson), centuries in eastern India, possibly Kamarupa. Tāranātha lists Saroruha and Kampala (also known as Lva-va-pā, Kambhalī, and Śrī-prabhada") as its "bringers":

. . . the foremost yogi Virupa meditated on the path of Yamāri and attained siddhi under the blessings of Vajravārāhi, . . . His disciple Dombi Heruka..understood the essence of the Hevajra Tantra, and composed many śāstras like the Nairātmā-devi-sādhana and the Sahaja-siddhi. He also conferred abhiṣeka on his own disciples. After this, two ācāryas Lva-va-pā and Saroruha brought the Hevajra Tantra. . . . Siddha Saroruha was the first to bring the Hevajra-pitṛ-sādhana

Another lineage, mentioned by Jamgon Kongtrul, goes from Vilāśyavajra to Anangavajra to Saroruha, and thence to Indrabhuti.

Jamgon Amyeshab, the 28th throne-holder of Sakya, considers the Hevajra Tantra to have been revealed to Virupa by the Nirmanakaya Vajranairatma; it is considered by him also to have been revealed by Nirmanakaya Vajranairatma to Dombhi Heruka, Virupa's senior disciple, from whom the main Sakya exegetical lineage of the Hevajra Tantra descends.

The Yogaratnamālā, arguably the most important of the commentaries on the Hevajra Tantra, was written by one Kṛṣṇa or Kāṇha, who taught Bhadrapada, another commentator, who in turn taught Tilopa, the teacher of Nāropa, who himself wrote a commentary; he, in turn, passed on his knowledge of this tantra to Marpa (1012–1097 AD), who also taught in his native Tibet. Marpa also received instruction in the Hevajra Tantra from Maitrīpa, alias Advayavajra, who was banished from Vikramashila for practicing with a yoginī during the time of Atīśa's abbacy.

Kanha was one of the authors of Charyapada.

=== Tibet ===
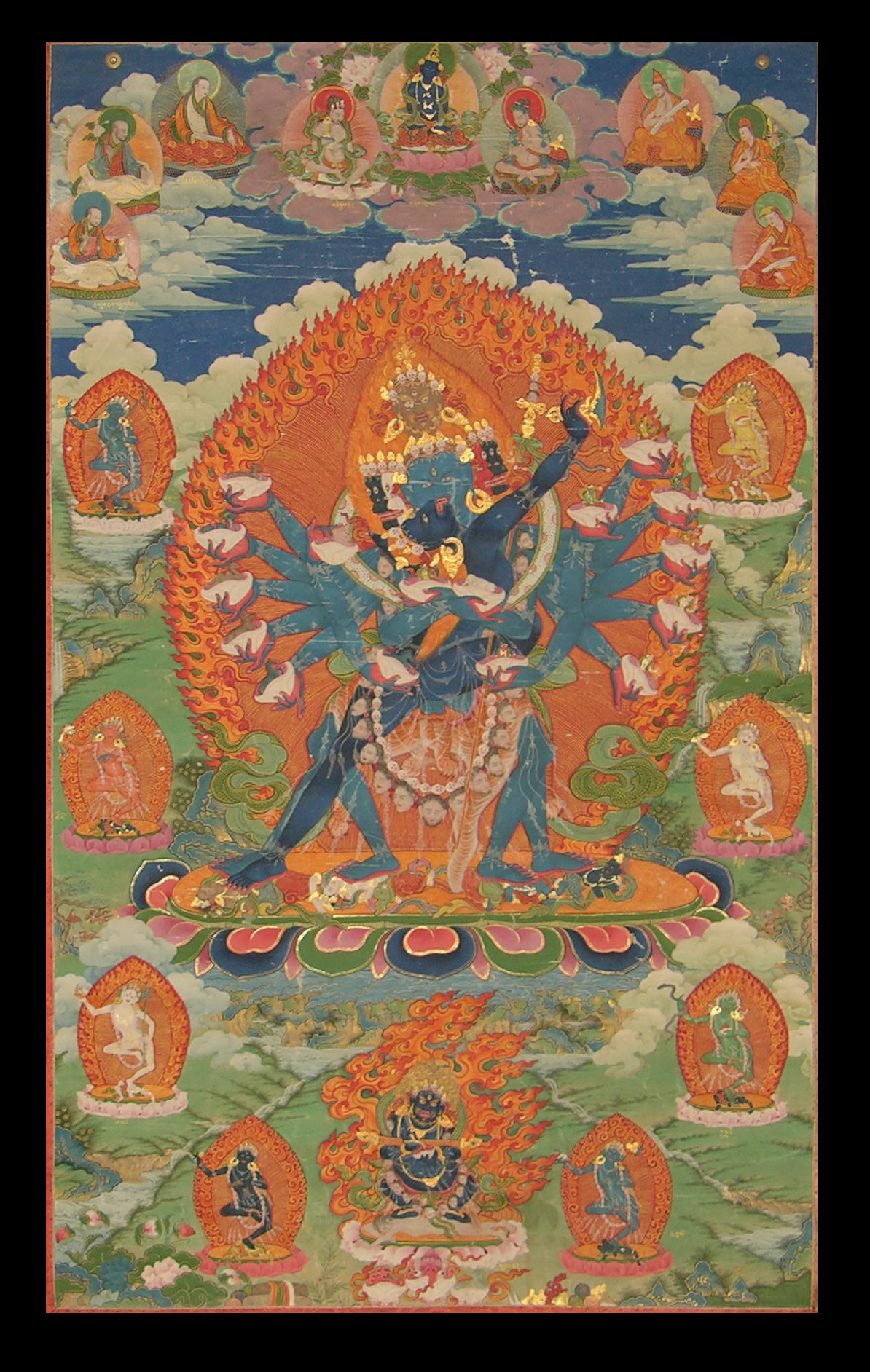
Hevajra and Nairatmya. Tibet, 18th Century

Some time in the early 11th century, Drogmi Lotsawa Shākya Yeshe ('brog mi lo ts'a ba sh'akya ye shes) (993–1077 AD) journeyed from Drompa-gyang in Lhatsé to Nepal and India, including Vikramashila, where he received instruction in the Hevajra Tantra from Śānti-pa (Ratnākaraśānti), and later to Bengal, where he encountered Prajñedraruci (Vīravajra) who instructed him in the "rootless Margapala" (Tib. Lamdré) that is particularly concerned with the Hevajra Tantra and its commentaries. Drakpa Gyeltsen writes in his Chronicle of the Indic Masters:

Now Lachen [Drokmi] first went to Nepal and entered into the door of mantra through [the teacher] Bhāro Ham-thung. Then he went to India itself and, realizing that the Āchārya Ratnākaraśānti was both greatly renowned and learned, he heard extensively the Vinaya, Prajñapāramitā, and mantra. Then having gone to the eastern part of India, he encountered Bhikṣu Vīravajra, who was the greatest direct disciple of Durjayachandra, who himself had held the lineage of Āchārya Virūpa's own disciple, Ḍombiheruka. From Bhikṣu Vīravajra he heard extensively the mantra material of the three tantras of Hevajra, complete in all their branches. He also requested the many instruction manuals of Acintyakrama and so forth, so that he heard the "Lamdré without the fundamental text" (rtsa med lam 'bras) as well. In this way, Drokmi lived in India for twelve years and became a great translator.

After twelve years—probably by 1030—he returned to central Tibet, translated the Hevajra Tantra into Tibetan, and taught, among others, Dkon mchog ryal po (1034–1102 AD), who founded the Sa-skya Monastery in 1073 AD. This was the beginning of the close relationship between the Sakya Order and the Hevajra Tantra.

In the Blue Annals, Gos lotsawa suggests that both the Hevajra and the Kalachakra Tantras are commentaries on, or introductions to, the Guhyasamāja.

=== Elsewhere ===
==== China ====
The Chinese version of the Hevajra Tantra (Taishō XVIII 892, p. 587–601) was translated by Fa-hu (Dharmapāla) at the Institute for Canonical Translations (Yi jing yuan) in the capital of the Northern Sung (960-1128 AD), Bian liang, present day Kaifeng in Henan province. The five-volume translation was presented to Emperor Renzong at the end of Zhi he 1 (11 February 1054–30 January 1055 AD) . However, the Hevajra Tantra did not become popular in China. The title of the Chinese version reads "The Scriptural Text of the Ritual of The Great King of the Teaching The Adamantine One with Great Compassion and Knowledge of the Void explained by the Buddha." The preface reads:

From among the 32 sections of the general tantra of Mahāmāyā one has taken 2 rituals with Nairātmyā. Dharmapāla, Great Master who transmits Sanskrit (texts), thoroughly illuminated and enlightened with Compassion, Probationary Senior Lord of Imperial Banquets, Grandee of Imperial Banquets with the Honour of Silver and Blue, Tripiṭaka from India in the West during the Sung, received the honour of translating it by Imperial Mandate.

==== Cambodia ====
Surviving images indicate that the Hevajra Tantra was present in Cambodia during the Khmer Empire and its practice thrived in Cambodia from the 10th to 13th centuries.

==== Mongolia ====
In 1244 the grandson of Genghis Khan, Prince Godan, invited Sakya Pandita to Mongolia and was initiated by him into the Hevajra teachings. In 1253 Kublai Khan invited Sakya Pandita's nephew Chogyal Phagpa to court. As a result, Buddhism was declared the state religion and Phagpa was given authority over three of Tibet's provinces.

=== The West ===
The Hevajra Tantra became the first major Buddhist Tantra to be translated in its entirety into a Western language when David Snellgrove published his The Hevajra Tantra: A Critical Study in 1959. This work is in two volumes, the first volume containing his introduction including an "apology" explaining why such a text is worthy of study (apparently because of the unsavory reputation the tantras had acquired in the West early in the 20th century). Writing in 1959 he was able to say, "There is still a tendency to regard them as something corrupt, as belonging to the twilight of Buddhism." The second volume contains his editions of the Sanskrit and Tibetan texts (the Tibetan text being taken from the snar thang Kengyur) as well as a Sanskrit text of the Yogaratnamālā. Another translation appeared in 1992 as The Concealed Essence of the Hevajra-tantra. by G.W. Farrow and I. Menon. This version contains the Sanskrit text and English translation of the tantra as well as a complete English translation of the Yogaratnamālā. An English translation from Fa-hu's Chinese version was made by Charles Willemen in 1983 and published as "The Chinese Hevajratantra". In 2008 the German scholar Jan-Ulrich Sobisch published a detailed literary history of Indian and Tibetan writings on Hevajra as it was seen through the eyes of A-mes-zhabs, a 17th-century master of the Sa-skya-pa tradition (Sobisch 2008).

== Text ==
Originally written in mixed-quality Sanskrit (with some verses in Apabhraṃśa), the present 750-verse text is reported to be but an excerpt or summary of a much larger, original text of up to 500,000 ślokas (verses) in 32 sections. Many Buddhist texts claim to be condensations of much larger missing originals, with most of the alleged originals either never having been found, or perhaps conceived of as "virtual" texts that exist permanently in some disembodied way. However, the existence of the 100,000 verse Prajnaparamita Sutra shows that works of such proportions were actually produced.

The Hevajra Tantra has some material in common with other sources: II iii 29 of the Hevajra Tantra is the same as XVI 59c-60b of the Guhyasamaja Tantra, and an Apabhraṃśa couplet at II v 67 of the Hevajra Tantra appears in one of Saraha's songs. In the case of the Guhyasamaja, it is safe to assume that the Hevajra version is later, but the case is not as clear cut with the Saraha quote, since the relative dates are harder to establish with any certainty.

=== Root Tantra ===
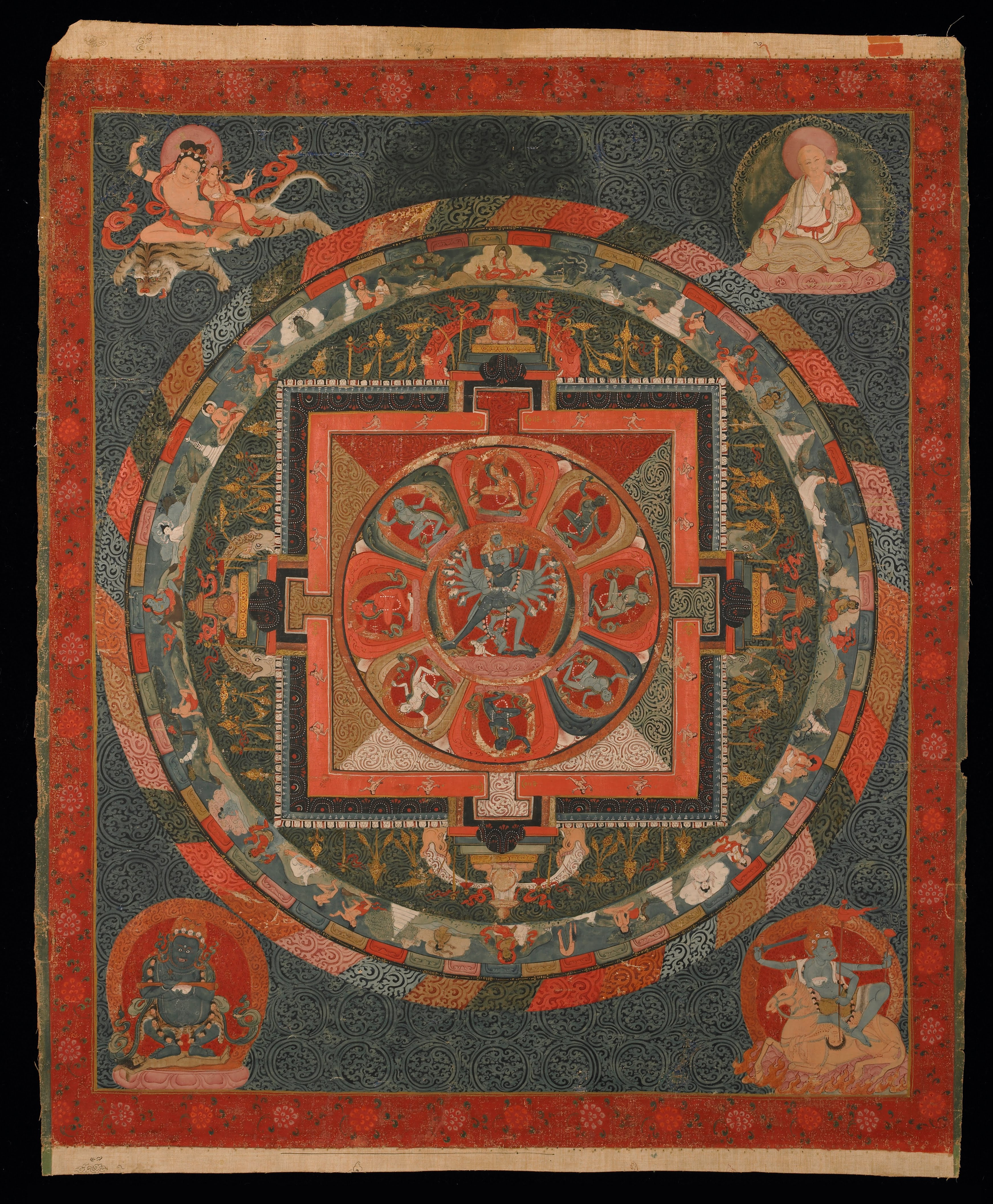
Hevajra mandala, 17th-century painting, Rubin Museum of Art

Dvātriṃśatkalpoddhṛtaḥ kalpadvayātmako śrīhevajraḍākinījālasamvaramahātantrarājā

- Manuscripts in the National Archives, Kathmandu, Nepal
  - No. 3-303.
  - No. 3-238.
  - No. 4-6.
  - No. 4-71.
- Manuscript in the Cambridge University Library, Add. 1340
- Manuscript belonging to the Asiatic Society of Bengal, no. 11317
- Manuscripts in the Tōkyō University Library: Nos 509-512
- Editions:
  - Snellgrove
  - Farrow and Menon

Tibetan:

- kye'i rdo rje zhes bya ba rgyud kyi rgyal po - Narthang Kangyur, snar thang 369, vol. 80, rgyud (ka) 306b-351b
  - colophon: rgyud kyi rgyal po sgyu ma'i brtag pa zhes bya ba brtag pa sum cu rtsa gnyis las phyung ba brtag pa gnyis kyi bdag nyid kye'i rdo rje mkha' 'gro ma dra ba'i sdom pa'i rgyud kyi rgyal po chen po rdzogs so/ /rgya gar gyi mkhan po ga ya d+ha ra'i zhal snga nas dang/ bod kyi lo ts+tsha ba dge slong shAkya ye shes kyis bsgyur cing zhus te gtan la phab pa/
  - Edition: Snellgrove
- kye'i rdo rje zhes bya ba rgyud kyi rgyal po (Hevajratantrarājanāma) Tōh. 417, sDe-dge Kangyur rgyud 'bum vol. nga, 1b-13b
  - colophon: kye'i rdo rje mkha' 'gro ma dra ba'i sdom pa las rdo rje snying po mngon par byang chub zhes bya ba brtag pa'i rgyal po rdzogs so
- kye'i rdo rje zhes bya ba rgyud kyi rgyal po Urga Kangyur, urga 418, vol.79, rgyud (nga), 1r-30r
  - colophon: rgyud kyi rgyal po chen po sgyu ma'i brtag pa zhes bya ba brtag pa sum cu rtsa gnyis las phyung pa brtag pa gnyis kyi bdag nyid kye'i rdo rje mkha' 'gro ma dra ba'i sdom pa'i rgyud kyi rgyal po rdzogs so/ /rgya gar gyi mkhan po ga ya d+ha ra'i zhal snga nas bod kyi lo ts+tsha ba dge slong shAkya ye shes kyis bsgyur cing zhus te gtan la phab pa/slar yang lo ts+tsha ba gzhon nu dpal gyis 'gyur chad bsabs shing dag par bgyis pa'o/
- kye'i rdo rje zhes bya ba rgyud kyi rgyal po Stog Palace Kangyur, stog 379, Volume 94, rgyud bum (ga), 107r-148v
  - colophon: rgyud kyi rgyal po sgyu ma'i brtag pa zhes bya ba brtag pa sum cu rtsa gnyis las phyung ba brtag pa gnyis kyi bdag nyid kye'i rdo rje mkha' 'gro ma dra ba'i sdom pa'i rgyud kyi rgyal po chen po rdzogs so/ /rgya gar gyi mkhan po ga ya d+ha ra'i zhal snga nas dang/ bod kyi lo tsa ba dge slong shAkya ye shes kyis bsgyur cing zhus te gtan la phab pa
- kye'i rdo rje zhes bya ba rgyud kyi rgyal po Lhasa Kangyur, lhasa 380, volume 79, rgyud (ka), 672-761
  - colophon: rgyud kyi rgyal po sgyu ma'i brtag pa zhes bya ba brtag pa sum cu rtsa gnyis las phyung ba brtag pa gnyis kyi bdag nyid kye'i rdo rje mkha' 'gro ma dra ba'i sdom pa'i rgyud kyi rgyal po chen po rdzogs so/ /rgya gar gyi mkhan po ga ya d+ha ra'i zhal snga nas bod kyi lo ts+tsha ba dge slong shAkya ye shes kyis bsgyur cing zhus te gtan la phab pa

=== Commentaries ===
- Yogaratnamālā by Kāṇha
- Śrīhevajravyākhyākhyāvivaraṇa by Bhadrapāda
- Netravibhanga by Dharmakīrtī
- Smṛtiniṣpatti (?) by Kāṇha
- Vajrapādasārasaṃgraha by Nāro
- Muktāvalī by Ratnākaraśānti
  - Sanskrit edition from five manuscripts by Ram Shankar Tripathi and Thakur Sain Negi in the series Bibliotheca Indo-Tibetica Series XLVIII, Central Institute for Higher Tibetan Studies, Sarnath, 2001.
- Padminī by Saroruha
- Suviśuddhasaṃpuṭa by Ṭankadāsa
- Ṣaṭsāhasrikā-Hevajra-Ṭīkā by Daśabhūmīśvara Vajragharba
  - Sanskrit edition from two incomplete mss, Tibetan edition, with English translation of Sanskrit portion and summary of remaining part, in Shendge, Malati J., 2004. Ṣaṭsāhasrikā-Hevajra-Ṭīkā: A Critical Edition. Pratibha Prakashan, Delhi. "On this shorter tantra of 750 verses containing many vajrapadas which is selected from another big tantra of five lakhs (500,000) of verses, is revealed this commentary, which owes its inspiration to Hevajra and which is known to contain 6000 verses and following mulatantra, by the illustrious Vajragarbha." (1.4-6)

=== Explanatory Tantras ===
- Ḍākinīvajrapañjaratantra
- Saṃpuṭatantra

== Iconography ==
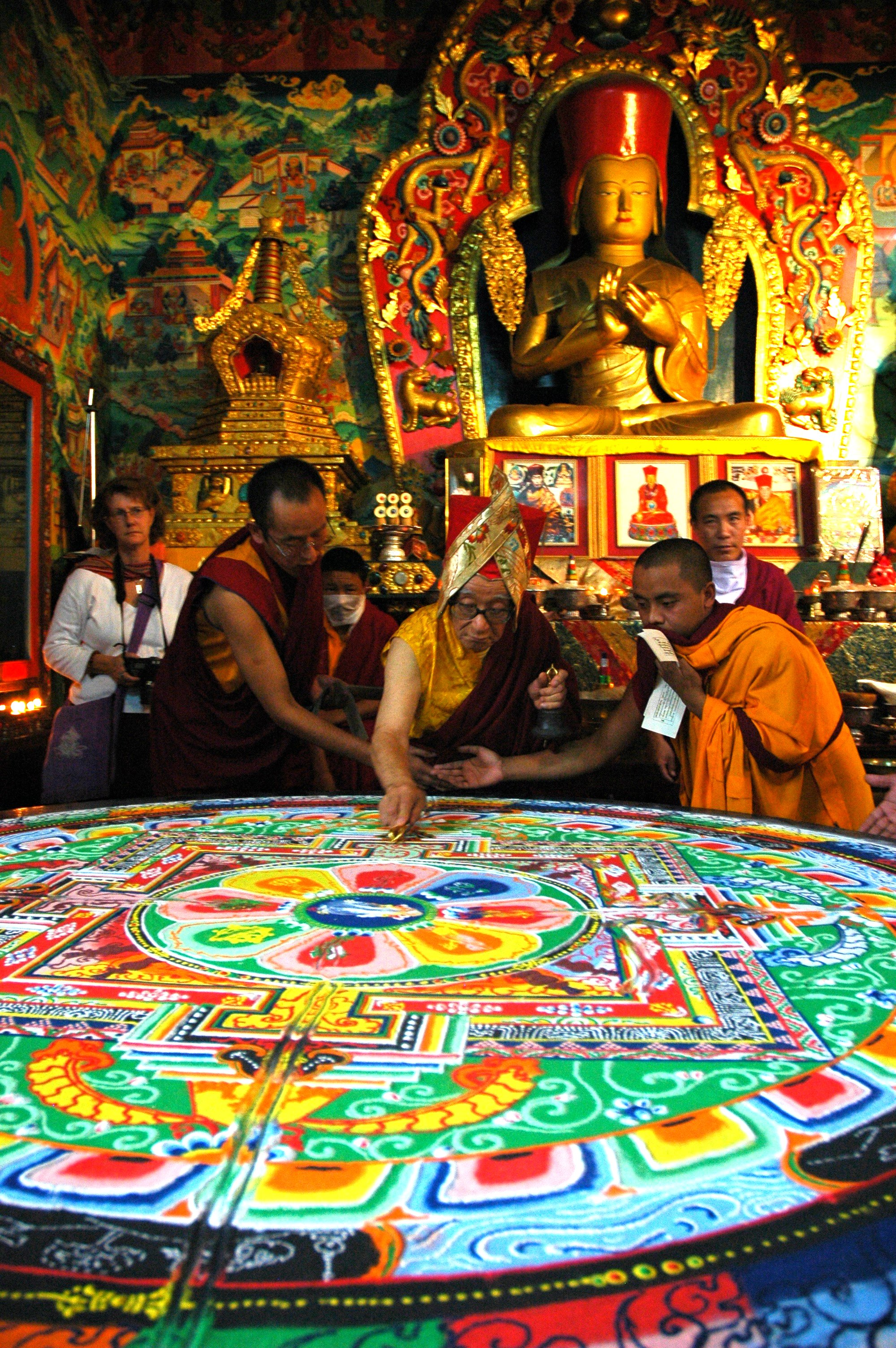
Jigdal Dagchen Rinpoche closes the Hevajra Mandala of colored sand using a gold dorje below statue of Sakya Pandita

Hevajra has four forms described in the Hevajra Tantra and four forms described the Samputa Tantra:

=== Hevajra Tantra ===
==== Kaya Hevajra ====
The two armed Body (Kaya) Hevajra described in the Hevajra Tantra stands in an advancing posture on a multi-coloured lotus, corpse, and sun disk. He is dark blue in colour. His right hand holds a vajra club, and his left hand holds a vajra-marked skull cup. He embraces his consort Vajranairatma (rDo-rje bDag-med-ma). A khatvanga staff rests on his left shoulder and he is adorned with the six symbolic ornaments.

In the Sadhanamala this form of Hevajra is single (ekavira) - without a consort.

==== Vak Hevajra ====
The four armed Speech (Vak) Hevajra described in the Hevajra Tantra stands in an advancing posture on a multi-coloured lotus, corpse, and sun disk. He is dark blue in colour. One right hand holds a vajra and one left hand a skull full of blood, the other pair of arms embrace his consort Vajravarahi (rDo-rje phag-mo).

==== Citta Hevajra ====
The six armed Mind (Citta) Hevajra described in the Hevajra Tantra stands in an advancing posture with right leg extended and left bent on a multi-coloured lotus, corpse, and sun disk. He is dark blue in colour with three faces - C. blue, R. white and L. red. Each face has three blood shot eyes and four bared fangs, and frowns with knotted brows. His tawny hair streams up surmounted with a crossed vajra. Two right hands hold a vajra and a knife, two left a trident and a bell; the remaining pair of arms embrace his consort Vajrasrinkhala. Hevajra is imbued with the nine dramatic sentiments and adorned with a diadem of five dry skulls, a necklace of fifty fresh heads and the six symbolic ornaments or 'seals'.

==== Hrdaya Hevajra ====
The sixteen-armed, four-legged eight-faced Heart (Hrdaya) Hevajra described in the Hevajra Tantra stands with two legs in ardha-paryanka and the other two in alidha posture (left bent, right extended) on a multi-coloured eight petalled lotus, the four Maras in the forms of yellow Brahma, black Vishnu, white Shiva (Mahesvara) and yellow Indra and a sun disc resting on their hearts.

Sri Hevajra is 16 years old, black in color, naked, with eight faces, sixteen arms and four legs. His central face is black, the first right white, the first left red, the upper face smoke-coloured and ugly; the outer two faces on each side, black. All have three round blood shot eyes, four bared fangs, a vibrating tongue, and frowning with knotted brows. His lustrous tawny hair streams upward crowned with a crossed vajra. He is adorned with a diadem of five dry skulls. The sixteen hands hold sixteen skull cups. The central pair of arms skull contain a white elephant and the yellow earth-goddess Prithvi, and embrace his consort Vajranairatma (rDo-rje bDag-med-ma) whose two legs encircle his body. Her right hands holds a curved knife (kartika), while the left is wrapped around the neck of her lord and holds a skullcup (kapala). In the other seven skull cups held in Hevajra's outer right hands are: a blue horse, a white-nosed ass, a red ox, an ashen camel, a red human, a blue sarabha deer, and an owl or cat. In the skull cups in the outer seven left hands are the white water-god Varuna, the green wind-god Vayu, the red fire-god Agni / Tejas, the white moon god Chandra, the red sun god Surya or Aditya, blue Yama lord of death and yellow Kubera or Dhanada lord of wealth. Hevajra is adorned with the six symbolic ornaments: circlet, earrings, necklace, bracelets, girdle armlets and anklets and smeared with the ashes of the charnel ground. He wears a necklace of fifty freshly severed human heads.

=== Samputa Tantra ===
The four forms of Hevajra described in the Samputa Tantra all dance on a lotus, corpse, blood-filled skull cup and sun disk throne.

==== Kaya Hevajra ====
The two armed Kaya-Hevajra (sku kyE rdo rje) - "Shaker of all the Three Worlds" ('jig-rten gsum kun-tu bskyod-pa) - stands in dancing posture on a multi-coloured lotus, corpse, blood-filled skull cup and sun disk. He is black in colour, with one face, three round red eyes, and two arms. His right hand wields a five pronged vajra club and the left hand holds a skull cup brimming with blood. He embraces his consort Vajranairatma (rdo-rje bdag-med-ma), blue in colour, with one face and two arms, holding curved knife and skull cup.

==== Vak Hevajra ====
The four armed Vak-Hevajra (sung kyE rdo rje), stands in dancing posture on a multi-coloured lotus, corpse, blood-filled skull cup and sun disk. He is black in colour with one face, three round red eyes two legs and four arms. The outer right hand wields a five pronged vajra club, the outer left hand holds a blood-filled skull-cup; the other pair of arms embrace his consort Vajravarahi (rDo-rje phag-mo), who is similar to him.

==== Citta Hevajra ====
The six armed Citta-Hevajra (thugs kyE rdo rje) stands in dancing posture (ardha paryanka) with his right toenails pressed against his left thigh on an eight-petaled multi-coloured lotus, corpse, skull-cup brimming with blood, and sun disc. He is black, with three faces: black, white and red - each face having three round blood shot eyes. His light yellowish hair streams upwards crested with a crossed vajra, and he wears a diadem of five dry skulls. He is adorned with a necklace of fifty freshly severed human heads, the six symbolic ornaments and clad in a tiger skin skirt. The first pair of hands hold a vajra and bell embracing is consort Vajrasrnkhala, who is similar to him. The other right hands hold an arrow and a trident. The other left hands hold a bow and a skull cup.

==== Hrdaya Hevajra ====
The sixteen-armed, four-legged Hrdaya Hevajra (snying po kyE rdo rje) stands with two legs in dancing posture (ardha paryanka) and two in aleedha posture (right leg extended) on an eight-petalled multicoloured lotus are, the four Maras (Skanda Mara in the form of yellow Brahma, Klesa Mara as black Vishnu, Mrtyu Mara as white Shiva, Devaputra Mara as pale yellow Śakra), a blood filled skull-cup and sun disc. He is black in colour with eight faces, sixteen arms and four legs. The central face is black and laughing loudly, the right is white and the left is red, and the upper face black and bears its fangs; the other eight faces are black. Each face has three blod-shot eyes. His tawny hair flows upwards crested with a double vajra and he wears a diadem of five dry skulls. He is adorned with a necklace of fifty freshly severed human heads, the six symbolic ornaments and clad in a tiger skin skirt. His first pair of hands hold a vajra and bell, embracing his consort Nairatma blue in colour with two hands holding a curved knife (gri gug) and skull cup. Hevajra's remaining right hands hold a sword, arrow, wheel, skull cup, club, trident and hook; the remaining left hands hold a lotus, bow, trident, skull, jewel, threatening forefinger and noose.

== See also ==
- Cakrasamvara and Vajravārāhī
- Hayagriva
- Hevajra at the Rubin Museum of Art
