= Kapala =

Cup made from a human skull used as a ritual implement

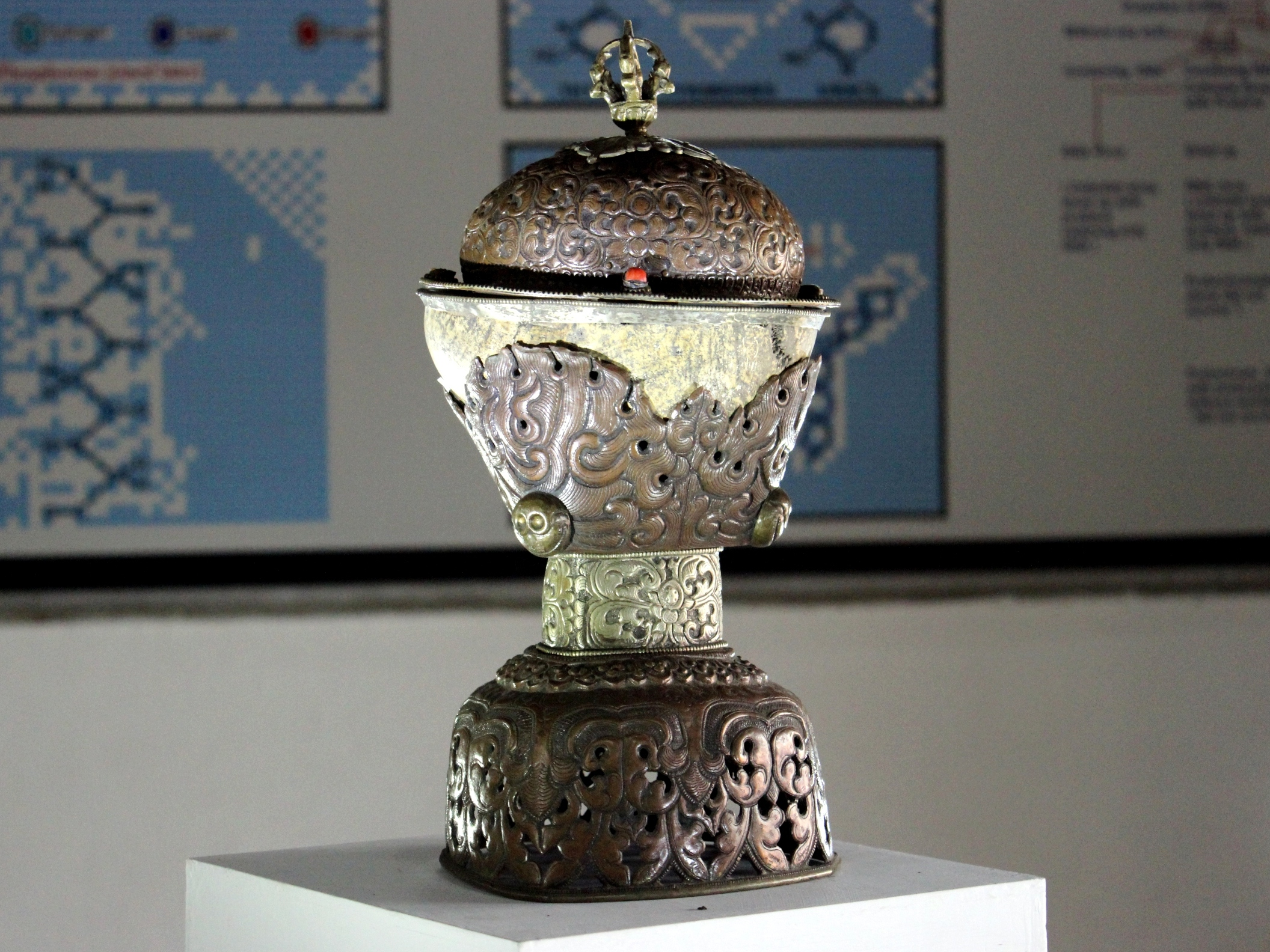
Kapala

A kapala (Sanskrit for "skull") is a skull cup used as a ritual implement (bowl) in both Buddhism Tantra and Tibetan Buddhist Tantra (Vajrayana). Especially in Tibetan Buddhism, kapalas are often carved or elaborately mounted with precious metals and jewels. In Hinduism, tantric practitioners and Aghoris use kapala for rituals.

== Etymology ==
'Kapala' (Tibetan: ཀ་པ་ལ་, Wylie: kapala) is a loan word into Tibetan from Sanskrit kapāla (Devanagari: कपाल), referring to the skull or forehead, usually of a human. By association, it refers to the ritual skullcup fashioned out of a human cranium. The Sanskrit word, in turn, was derived from Proto Indo-Aryan *kapā́las .

== In Hinduism ==
Kapalas are used mainly for esoteric purposes such as rituals. Among the rituals using kapalas are higher tantric meditation to achieve a transcendental state of mind within the shortest possible time, and libation to gods and deities to win their favor.

=== Hindu deities ===
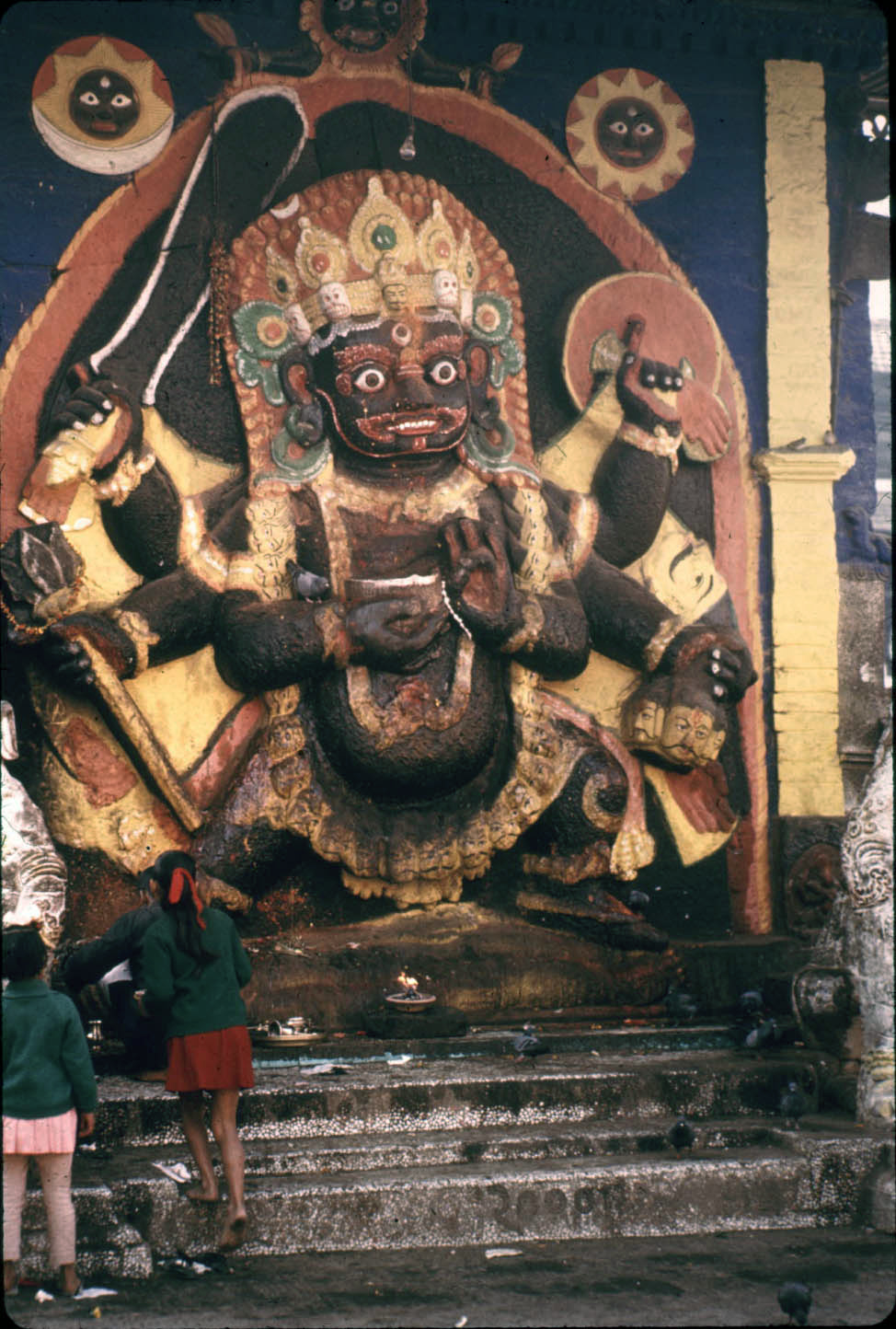
Bhairava's image in the Durbar Square, Kathmandu. He holds the kapala in his lower right hand, near his chest

Hindu deities that may be depicted with the kapala include Durga, Kālī and Shiva, especially in his Bhairava form. Even Ganesha, when adopted into Tibetan Buddhism as Maharakta Ganapati, is shown with a kapala filled with blood.

Some of the Hindu deities pictured thus are:

- Kālī, pictured in the most common four-armed iconographic image, shows each hand carrying variously a sword, a trishula (trident), a severed head, and a bowl or skullcup (kapala) catching the blood of the severed head.
- The Chamunda, a form of Durga, seen in the Halebidu temple built by the Hoysala, is described as wearing a garland of severed heads or skulls (Mundamala). She is described as having four, eight, ten, or twelve arms, holding a damaru (drum), trishula (trident), sword, a snake (nāga), skull-mace (khatvanga), thunderbolt (vajra), a severed head and panapatra (drinking vessel, wine cup) or skullcup (kapala), filled with blood.

=== Kapalikas ===
The Kāpālika tradition was a Tantric, non-Puranic form of Shaivism in India. The word is derived from kapāla, meaning "skull", and Kāpālika means the "skull-men". The Kāpālikas were an extinct sect of Shaivite ascetics devoted to the Hindu god Shiva dating back to the 8th century CE, which traditionally carried a skull-topped trident (khatvanga) and an empty skull as a begging bowl.

== In Buddhism ==
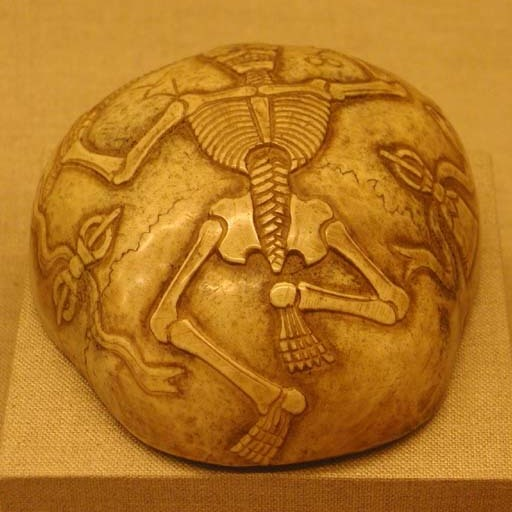
Tibetan carved kapala

In Tibetan monasteries, a kapala is used symbolically to hold bread or dough cakes, torma, and wine instead of blood and flesh as offerings to wrathful deities, such as the ferocious Dharmapāla ("defender of the faith"). The dough cakes are shaped to resemble human eyes, ears, and tongues. The kapala is made in the form of a skull, specially collected and prepared. It is elaborately anointed and consecrated before use. The cup is also elaborately decorated and kept in a triangular pedestal. The heavily embossed cup is usually made of silver-gilt bronze with a lid shaped like a skull and with a handle made in the form of a thunderbolt.

=== Vajrayana deities ===
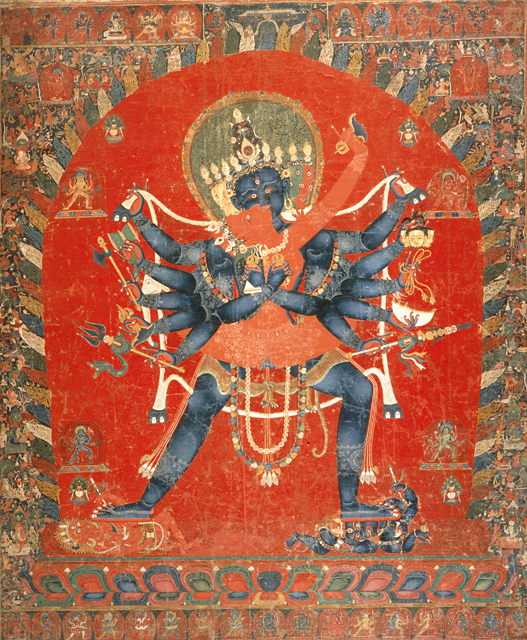
The Buddhist Deities Chakrasamvara and Vajravarahi, circa 15th century Painted Kapala is seen on one of the left hands

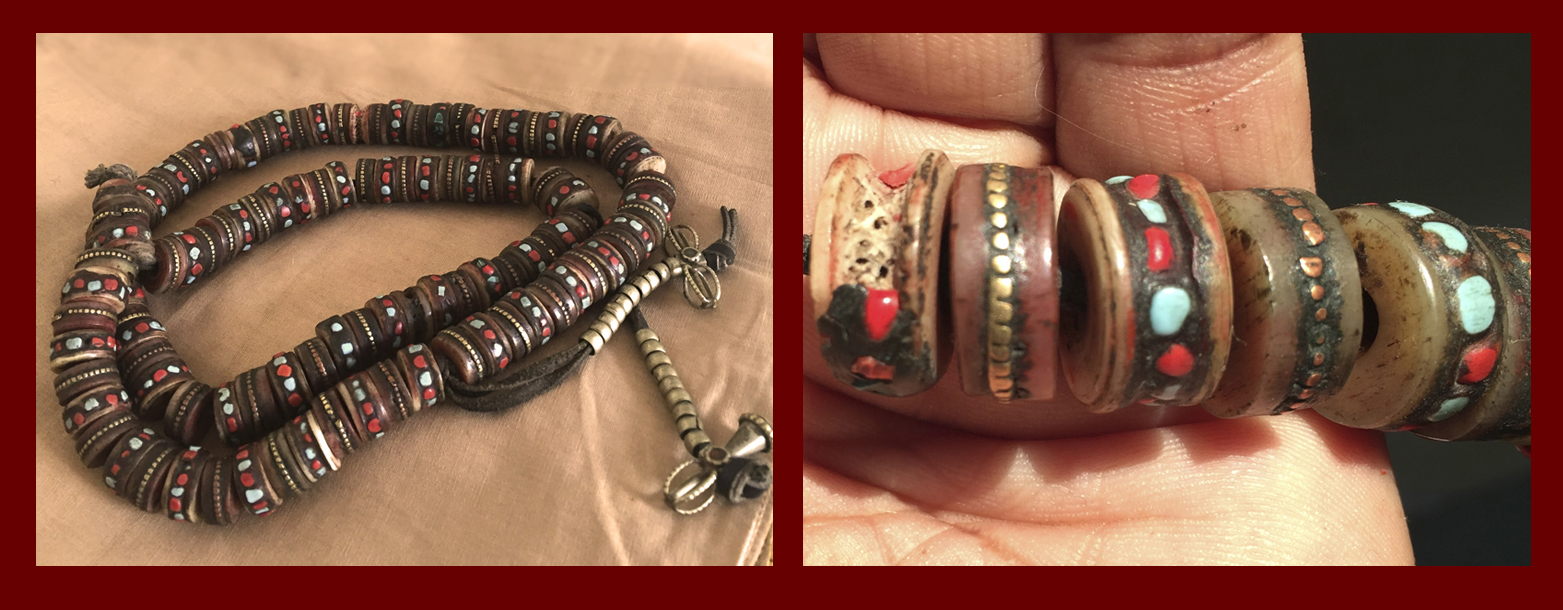
Kapala Mala, 19th century, Tibet, courtesy of the Wovensouls collection

Many of the deities of Vajrayana, including mahasiddhas, dakinis and dharmapalas, are depicted as carrying the kapala, usually in their left hand. Some deities such as the Hindu Chinnamasta and the related Buddhist Vajrayogini are depicted as drinking blood from the kapala. The kapala itself is a symbol of wisdom (prajna) and knowledge. In the inner-level or subtle-body practices of Buddhist Tantra, the underside of the skull contains the moon drops, which are melted by tummo or inner heat yoga, creating a cooling sensation of bliss as the drops move through the inner channels.

As many Vajrayana empowerments such as the vase empowerment are also performed by touching the top of the head, the kapala also represents the transmission of knowledge from the Tantric guru to disciple, known as lineage transmission. As blood was associated with hell-beings and was considered to be one of the most polluting substances in the Indian Vedas, the drinking of blood was an esoteric symbol for non-discrimination. As wisdom transforms all duhkha into emptiness (sunyata), a yogi who has accomplished the siddhi of non-discriminatory awareness has broken through all illusions of duality, of purity and impurity (all constructed realities), and most importantly, nirvana and samsara.

The ability to break through the duality of nirvana and samsara results in the union of emptiness and bliss, which is the highest expression of enlightenment in Vajrayana Buddhism. In this way, the image of the dakini who not only drinks but takes pleasure and delight from consuming the blood in the kapala is a powerful symbol of a yogi who has perfected the paramita of prajna, and who dwells in the reality of non-dualism.

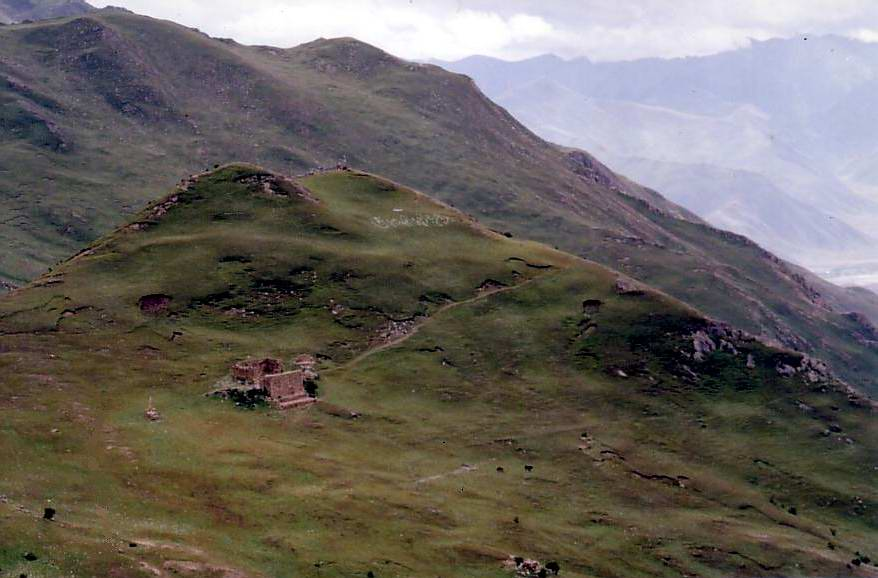
Sky burial site in Yerpa valley in Tibet where kapalas are searched for by tantric practitioners

=== Charnel ground or sky burial ===
The kapala is one of several charnel ground implements made from human bone found by tantrics at sky burial sites.

The charnel ground, an ancient Tibetan burial custom, is distinctly different from the customs of graveyards and cremation, but all three of them have been a part of the home ground of tantric practitioners such as the yogis and yoginis, Shaiva Kapalikas and Aghoris, shamans and sadhus. The charnel ground, often referred to as "sky burial" by Western sources, is an area demarcated specifically in Tibet, defined by the Tibetan word jhator (literal meaning is ’giving alms to the birds’), a way of exposing the corpse to nature, where human bodies are disposed as they are or in a chopped (chopped after the rituals) condition in the open ground as a ritual that has great religious meaning of the ascent of the mind to be reincarnated into another circle of life.

Such a practice results in finding human bones, half or whole skeletons, more or less putrefying corpses and detached limbs lying scattered around. Items made from human skulls or bones are found in the sky burial grounds by the Sadhus and Yogins of the tantric cult. The charnel grounds are also known by the epithets the "field of death" or the "valley of corpses". In Tibet, a class distinction in the burial practices is also noted. The dead High Lamas are buried in stupas or cremated, but the dead commoners are disposed of in the charnel ground or in a sky burial.

The products from the charnel ground are the charnel ground ornaments such as the i) crown of five skulls, ii) bone necklace, iii) bone armlets, iv) bone bracelets, v) bone skirt and vi) bone anklets, which decorate many images of dakinis, yoginis, dharmapalas and a few other deities (as may be seen in some of the pictures and stone images depicted in the gallery), and other products such as the bone trumpet, the skull cup and skull drum used by the tantric practitioners. Kapala or the skull cup is thus produced from the charnel ground.

== Gallery ==
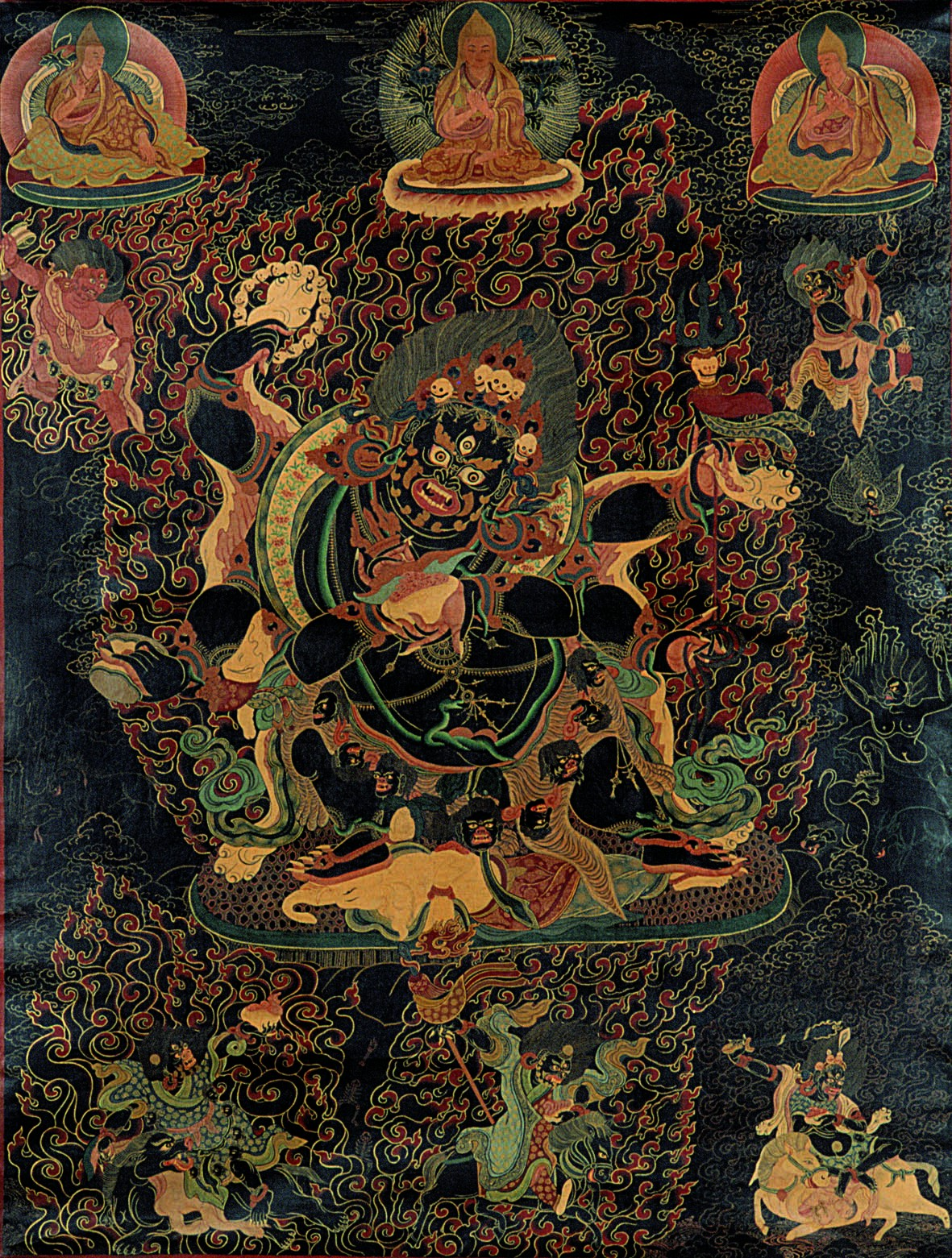
6 armed Mahakala – tantric protective deity with a kapala in the hand.

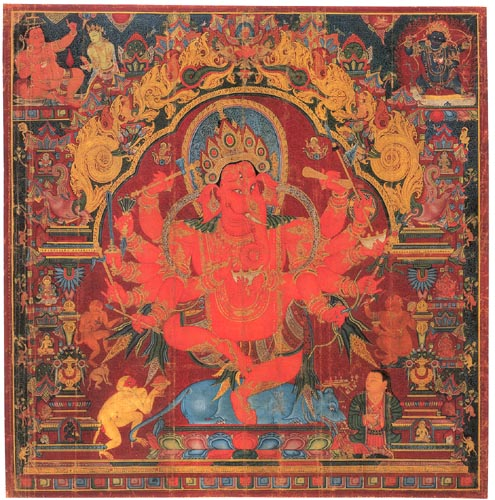
Dancing Rakta Ganapathi with Kapala in hand

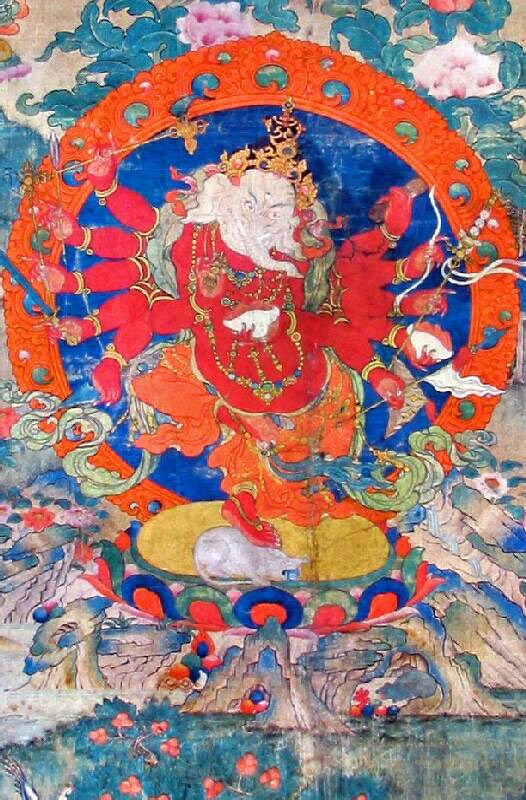
Tibetan Rakta Ganapathi with Kapala in hand

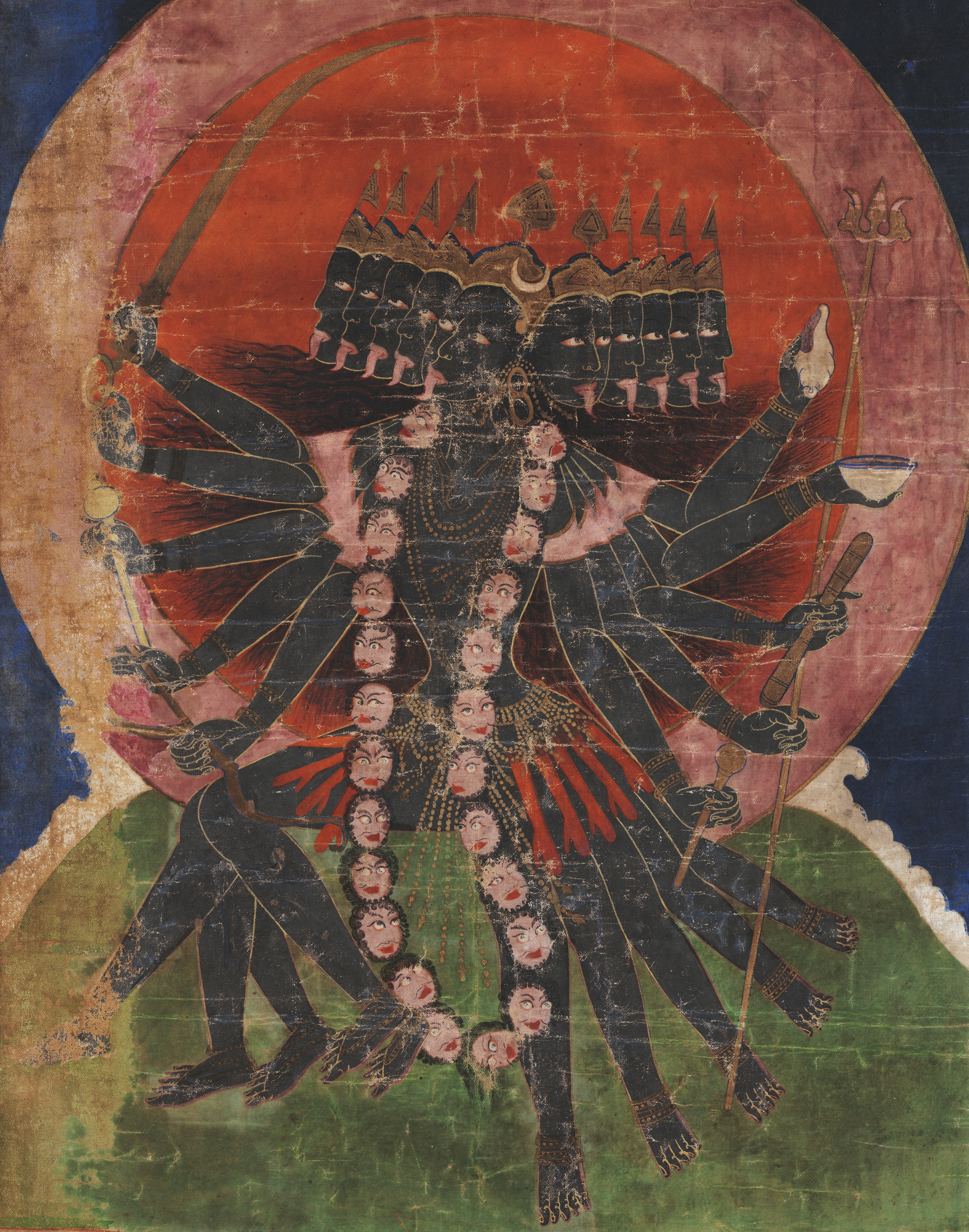
Ten armed Mahakali with Kapala in one hand

== See also ==
- Chöd
- Ganachakra
- Sahasrara
- Tachikawa skull ritual
