= Mundamala =

Garland of severed human heads and/or skulls in Hindu and Tibetan Buddhist iconography

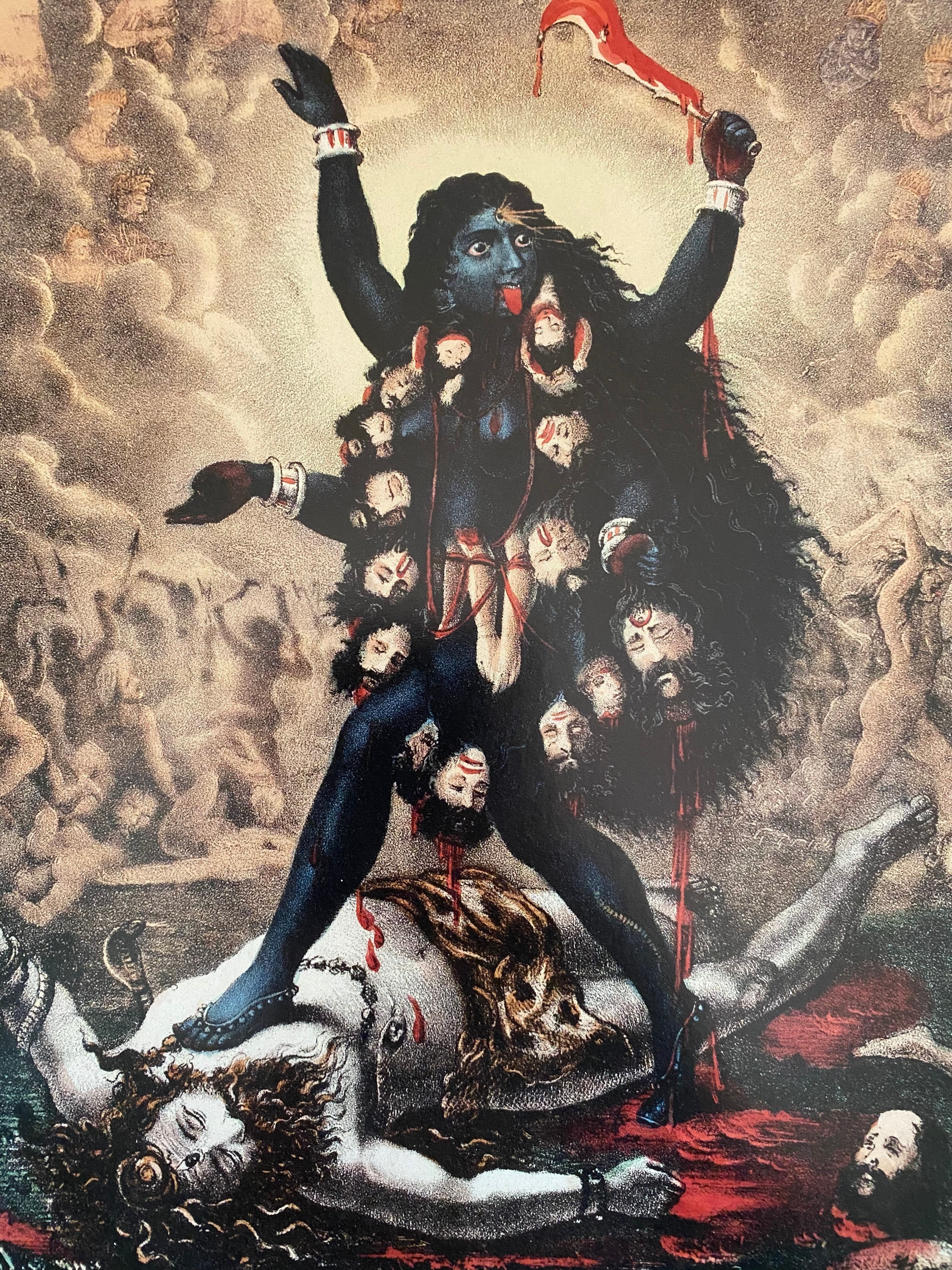
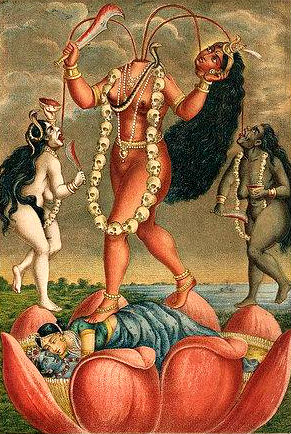
Kali (top) wears one of freshly severed heads; while Chhinnamasta (bottom; in center) and her attendants wear a skull-garland.

Mundamālā (Sanskrit: मुण्डमाला, IAST: Muṇḍamālā), also called kapālamālā or rundamala, is a garland of severed human heads and/or skulls, in Hindu iconography and Tibetan Buddhist iconography. In Hinduism, the mundamala is a characteristic of fearsome aspects of the Hindu Divine Mother and the god Shiva; while in Buddhism, it is worn by wrathful deities of Tibetan Buddhism.

== Hindu iconography ==
=== Fearsome goddesses ===
The mundamala is often found in the iconography of the Mahavidyas, a group of ten fearsome Tantric goddesses. Kali, the foremost Mahavidya, often wears a garland of freshly severed heads. The blood from her bleeding garland bathes her body. The number of heads in the mundamala is generally described as fifty. Other Mahavidyas like Tara, Chhinnamasta, Bhairavi, Dhumavati and Matangi are depicted or at least described wearing mundamalas; the goddess may also hold a severed head or skull (kapala) in her hand. In descriptions of Bhairavi, the heads are said to be so fresh that they vomit blood over her breasts.

Other fierce goddesses depicted often wearing the mundamala are Chamunda and Mahakali.

=== Shiva ===
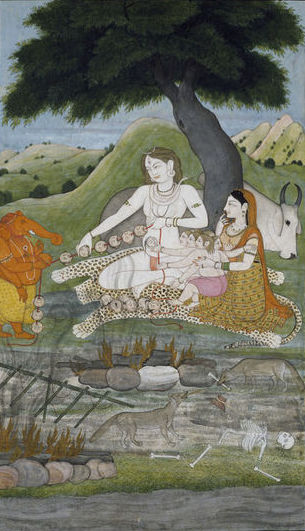
Shiva and his family stringing severed heads into a garland (mundamala), c. 1810

The god Shiva and his fierce manifestations are often depicted wearing the mundamala; Shiva is covered with ashes and skulls adorn him. Pahari paintings often picture Shiva's family making mundamalas. Shiva's son Kartikeya helps him or his consort Parvati handing over a head, while the latter threads them. Another scene depicts the parents making the mundamala, while Kartikeya and his brother Ganesha play nearby.

The ferocious manifestation of Shiva, Bhairava ("The Terrible") as well as Bhairava's various forms like Vatuk-Bhairava are depicted wearing the mundamala. Other fierce forms of Shiva wearing the mundamalas include Virabhadra, Gajasurasamhara ("Slayer of the Elephant demon") and the eight-armed Aghoramurti.

=== Symbolism ===
The fifty or fifty-two heads or skulls in the mundamala are described to symbolize the letters of the Sanskrit alphabet in Kali's iconography, thus signifying the wearer Kali as sabda Brahman, Ultimate Reality recognized as Sound and the primal sound of the sacred syllable Om. Another interpretation links the mundamala symbolizing the heads of foes and demons slain by the wearer goddess in battle. The mundamala in the context of Chhinnamasta's iconography is said to signify her victory over Time and fear of Death.

In Shiva's iconography, the mundamala represents the continual creation and destruction cycles of human existence.

== Buddhist iconography ==
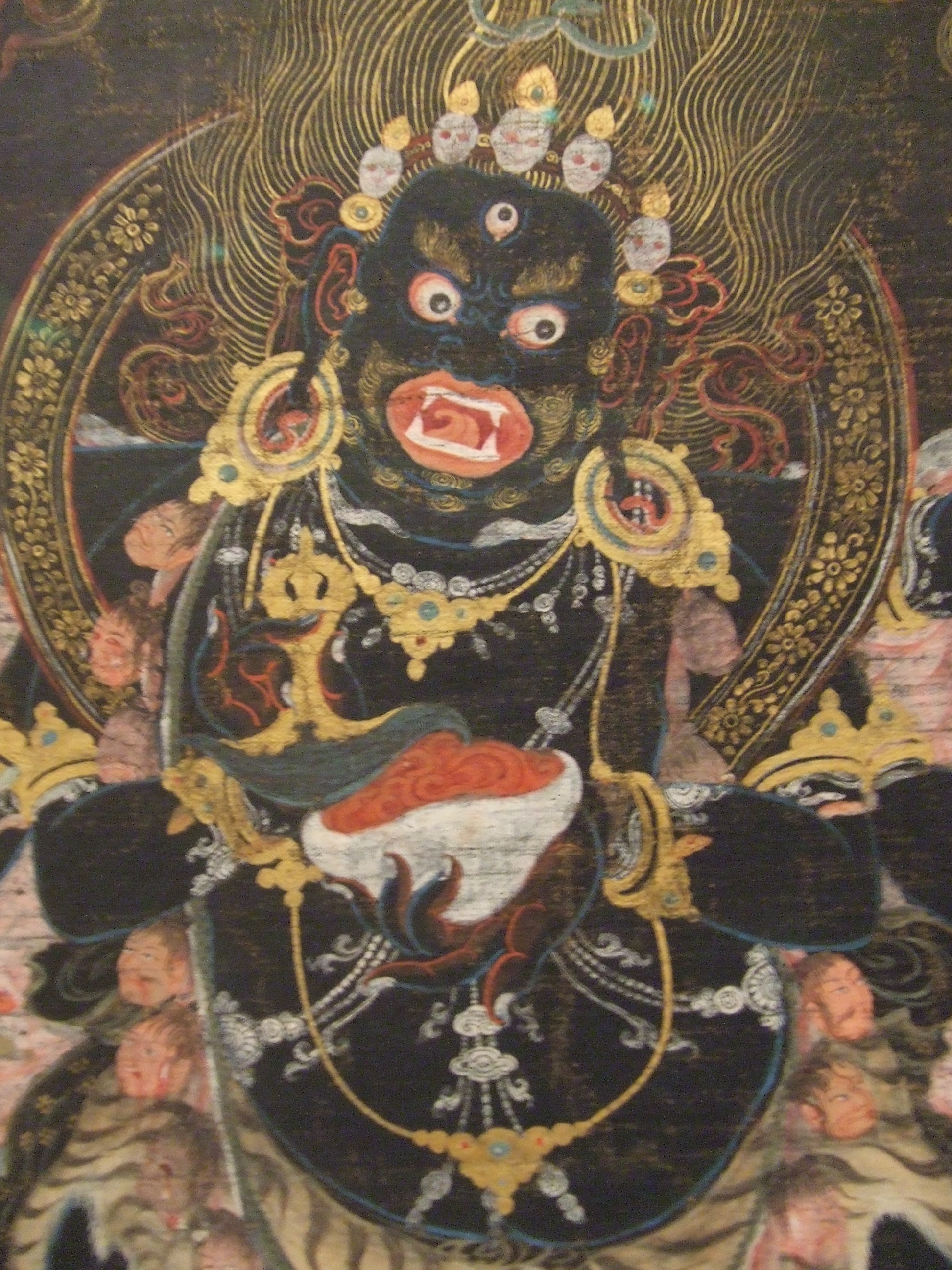
Mahakala wearing the mundamala

In Tibetan art, various wrathful deities, including the dharmapalas, wear the mundamala, a five-skull crown and human or animal skins. Manifestations of Akshobhya are generally fearsome and are depicted wearing the mundamala as well as skulls and serpents. These include Acala, Heruka, Chakrasamvara and Yamantaka. Mahakala, who from adopted from the Hindu Shiva also wears the mundamala. Hevajra and his terrific emanations also adore the mundamala.

Wrathful Buddhist goddesses like Marichi, Vajravarahi, Guhyeshvari and dakinis are depicted wearing the mundamala.

The Kumari, a girl worshipped as a goddess in Nepal, is identified with Vajravarahi by Buddhists. She wears a silver mundamala signifying her identity as Vajravarahi and her ferocious nature.

Like in Hindu iconography, the mundamala symbolizes the Sanskrit alphabet in Buddhist iconography too. In Chakrasamvara's iconography, it symbolizes the "abandonment of phenomenal appearances" as well as his union with his consort Vajravarahi (when depicted with him).
