= Nairatmya =

Personification of Buddhist concept of "no soul"

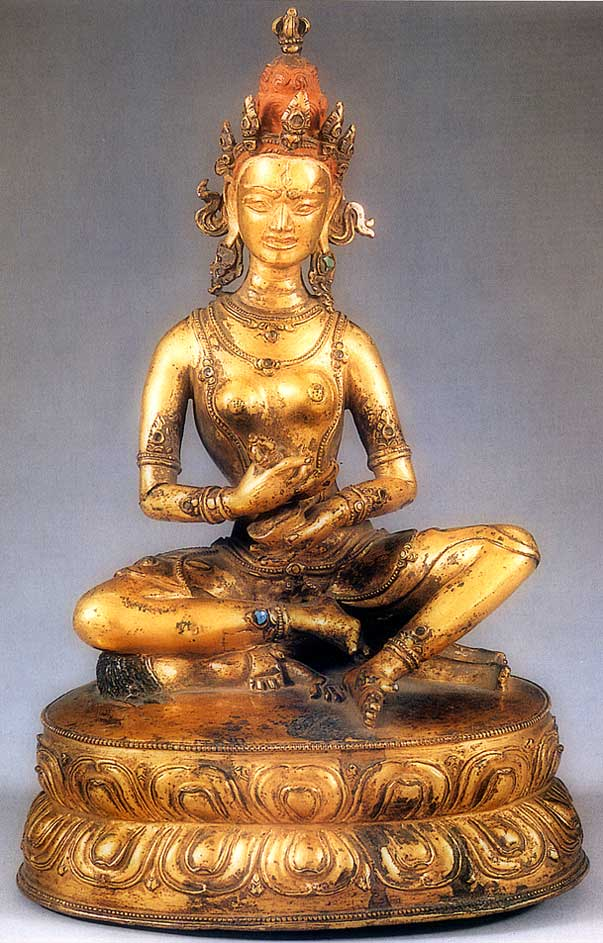
Nairatmya, Central Tibet, sixteenth century. Gilt copper inset with turquoise, painted with red pigment, H9.25 in. (23.5 cm). Los Angeles County Museum of Art, From the Nasli and Alice Heeramaneck Collection, purchase, M.70.1.4. Nairatmya represented as a seated yogini, her face ablaze with all-seeing wisdom.

Nairātmyā or Dagmema (Wylie: bdag med ma) is a Dakini, the consort of Hevajra in the Hevajra-tantra. Her name means "ego-less woman".

== See also ==
- Nairatmya - Concept in Buddhism
- Sitatapatra
- Narodakini
- Saraswati
- Queen Maya
- Hariti
- Yakshini
- Prithvi
- Vajrayogini
- Tara (Buddhism)
