= Cakrasaṃvara Tantra =

Buddhist text

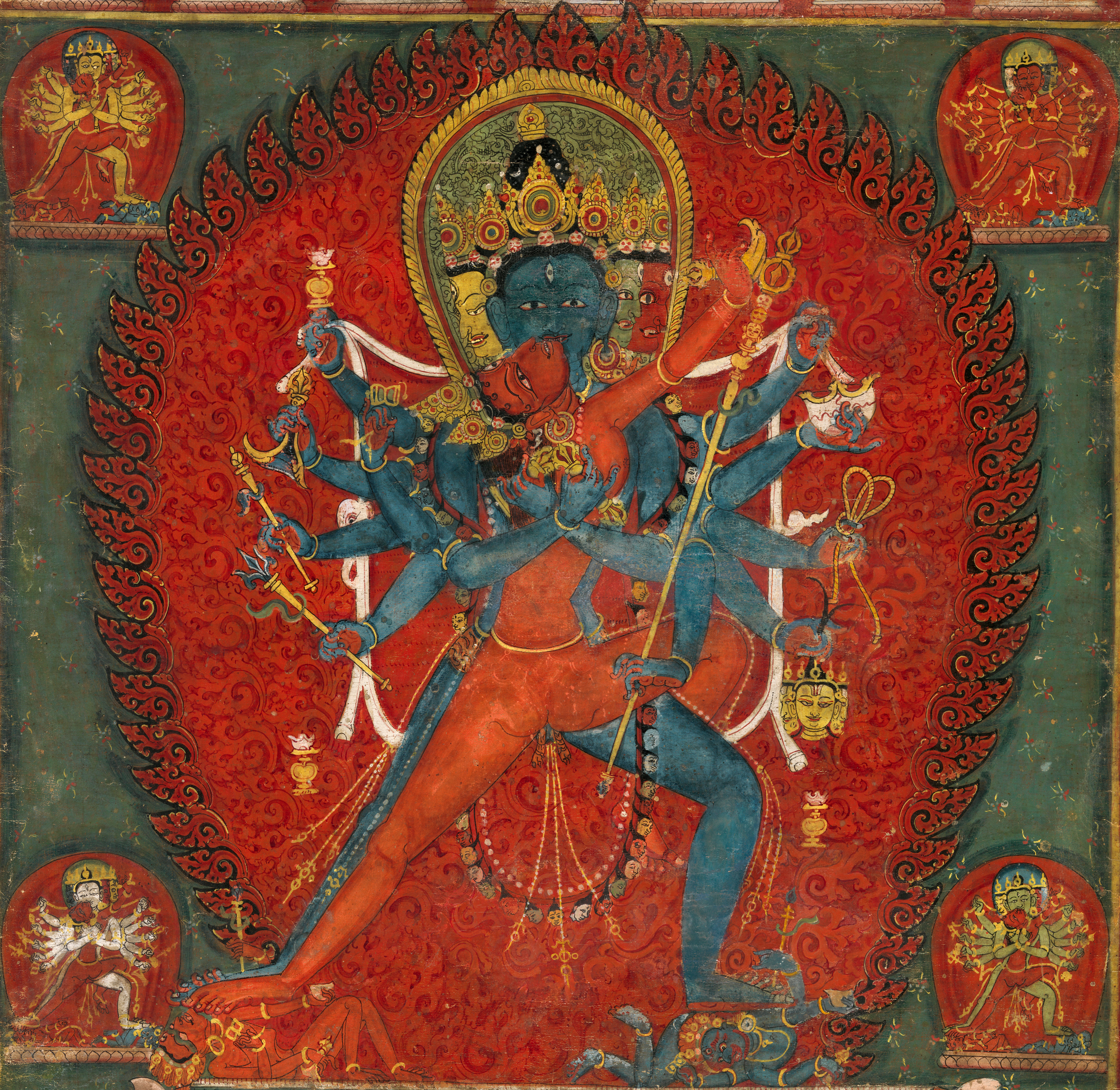
Saṃvara, the central deity of the tantra, with Vajravārāhī in Yab-Yum pose. Nepal, 1575-1600. Metropolitan Museum of Art

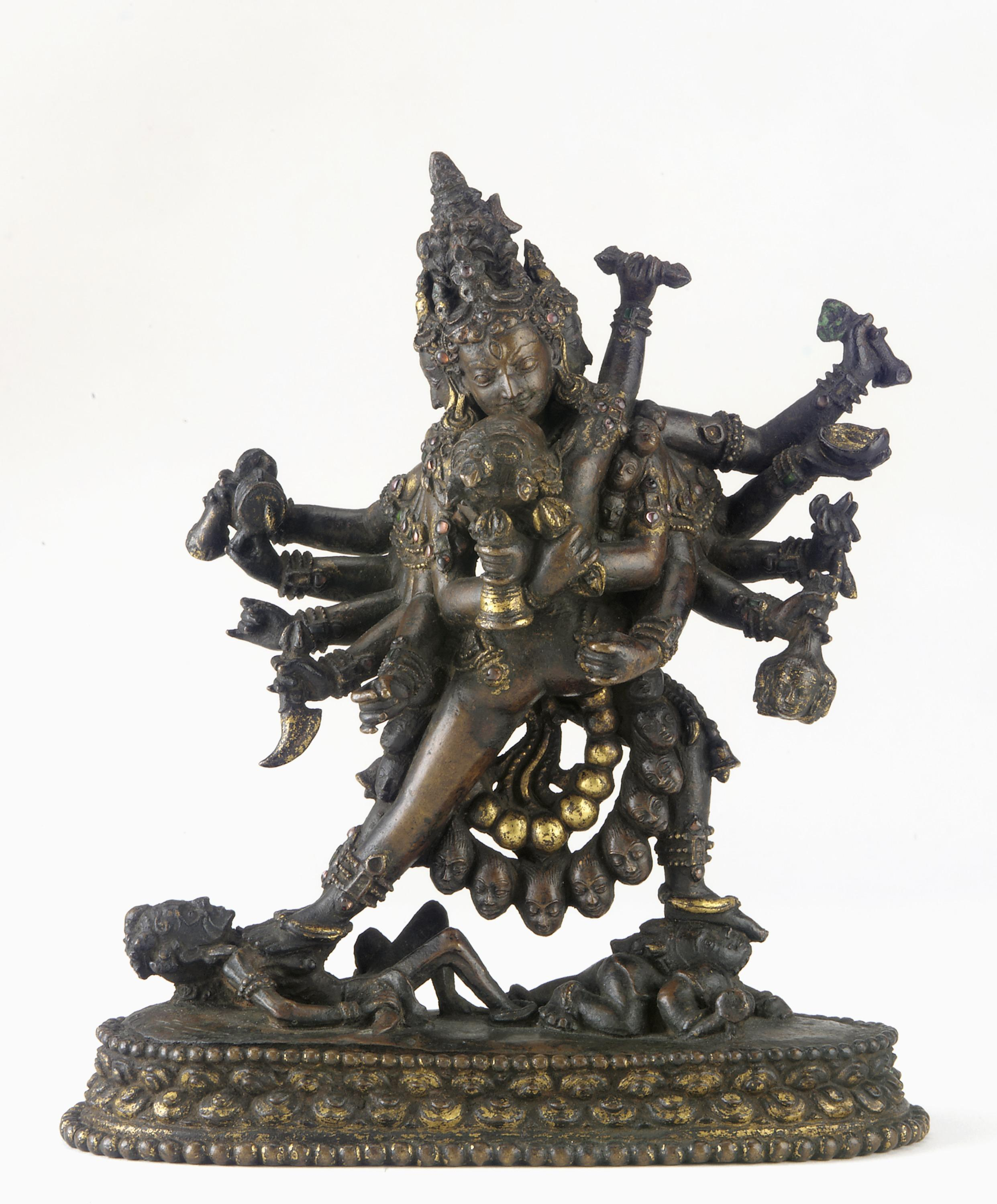
Sri Cakrasamvara and Vajravarahi. Nepal, 16th or 17th-century. Freer Gallery of Art

The Cakrasaṃvara Tantra (Tibetan: འཁོར་ལོ་བདེ་མཆོག་, Wylie: 'khor lo bde mchog, THL: khor lo dé chok, khorlo demchok, The "Binding of the Wheels" Tantra, Chinese: 勝樂金剛) is an influential Buddhist Tantra. It is roughly dated to the late 8th or early 9th century by David B. Gray (with a terminus ante quem in the late tenth century). The full title in the Sanskrit manuscript used by Gray's translation is: Great King of Yoginī Tantras called the Śrī Cakrasaṃvara (Śrīcakrasaṃvara-nāma-mahayoginī-tantra-rāja). The text is also called the Discourse of Śrī Heruka (Śrīherukābhidhāna) and the Samvara Light (Laghusaṃvara).

"Cakrasaṃvara" may also refer to the main deity in this tantra as well as to a collection of texts or "cycle" associated with the root Cakrasaṃvara tantra. Tsunehiko Sugiki writes that this "Cakrasaṃvara cycle", "is one of the largest collections of Buddhist Yoginītantra literature from the early medieval South Asian world." As Gray notes, it seems to have been very popular in northern India "during the late tenth through late thirteenth centuries when the second transmission of Buddhism to Tibet took place."

According to the modern scholar and translator David B. Gray, "its study and practice is maintained by the Newar Buddhist community in the Kathmandu valley, as well as by many Tibetan Buddhists, not only in Tibet itself but in other regions influenced by Tibetan Buddhism, including Mongolia, Russia, China, and elsewhere, as Tibetan lamas have been living and teaching in diaspora."

In the Tibetan classification schema, this tantra is considered to be of the "mother" class of the Anuttarayoga (Unsurpassable yoga) class, also known as the Yoginītantras. These tantras were known for their sexual yogas. The text survives in several Sanskrit and Tibetan manuscripts. There are at least eleven surviving Sanskrit commentaries on the tantra and various Tibetan ones.

The Cakrasamvara mostly comprises rituals and yogic practices which produce mundane siddhis (accomplishments) – such as flight – as well as the supramundane siddhi of awakening. These are achieved through practices such as deity yoga (visualizing oneself as the deity) and the use of mantras.

== Background ==
According to David B. Gray, the Cakrasaṃvara "developed in a non-monastic setting, and was composed via the active appropriation of elements of both text and practice belonging to non-Buddhist groups, most notably the Kapalikas, an extreme and quasi-heretical Saiva group focusing on transgressive practices." The British Indologist Alexis Sanderson has also written about how the Cakrasaṃvara literature appropriated numerous elements from the Shaiva Vidyapitha tantras, including whole textual passages.

Gray writes,

The term yogini in the name Yogini Tantra points to the unusual social context in which these texts arose. It appears almost certain that the Yogini Tantras, with their focus on sexual practices, the transgressive consumption of "polluting" substances such as bodily effluvia, female deities such as yoginis and dakinis, and fierce male deities, such as the Heruka deities—who are closely modeled on Saiva deities such as Mahakala and Bhairava, and bear the accoutrements of charnel ground dwelling yogins—did not solely derive from a mainstream monastic Buddhist context. Instead, they seem to have developed among and/or been influenced by liminal groups of renunciant yogins and yoginis, who collectively constituted what might be called the "siddha movement." ... who chose a deliberately transgressive lifestyle, drawing their garb and, in part, sustenance from the liminal space of the charnel ground that was the privileged locus for their meditative and ritual activities. The Saiva Kapalikas constituted the best-known group in this subculture, as attested by the numerous references to them in Sanskrit literature.

These appropriated non-Buddhist elements were transformed, explained or erased over time, with more Buddhist elements being added as the Cakrasaṃvara tradition developed and was adopted in major Buddhist institutions like Vikramashila (from about the 9th century onwards). A myth also developed in order to explain the appropriation (depicted as the subjugation of Shiva by Saṃvara). This both reduced Shiva (Rudra) and other Shaiva deities to a subordinate position under the Buddhist deities (which took their form) and explained the usage of Shaiva elements by Buddhists. In other cases, the presence of Saiva deities like Mahabhairava are explained referring to Buddhas (as stated in Jayabhadra's commentary).

== Deity, myth and mandala ==
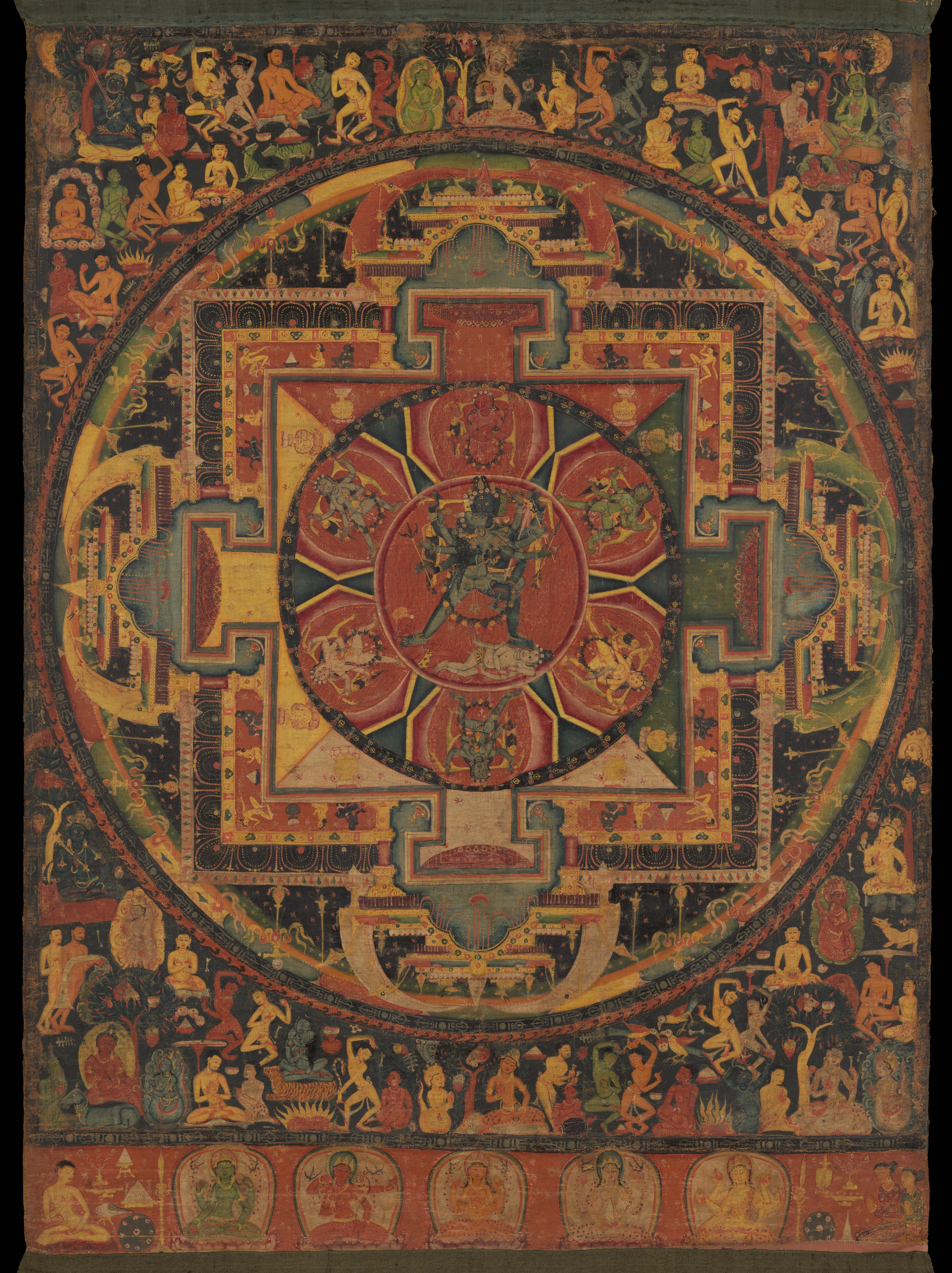
Cakrasamvara mandala, circa 1100, Nepal

The Cakrasaṃvara commentators consider the tantra to be a timeless divine revelation of either the Dharmakāya Buddha Mahāvajradhara or of the goddess Vajravārāhī.

The central deity of the tradition is called Samvara, Śamvara, Śrī Heruka, or simply Heruka. This figure became popular in Buddhist circles around the 8th century. The noun samvara derives from a verb which means to "bind," "enclose," or "conceal," and samvara commonly means "vow" and sometimes "sanctuary". In the tantra it appears in various compounds, such as "the binding of the dakini net" (ḍākinījālasamvara), which is associated with the term "union with Śrī Heruka." In this sense, samvara can also refer to "union", which is supreme bliss and supreme awakening. According to Gray, the "dakini net" is the Cakrasaṃvara mandala, dominated by the three wheels of the dakinis and their consorts. Furthermore, "its 'binding' is the process of union or mystical identification in which the adept engages via creative visualization, thereby achieving "union with Sri Heruka." This term thus refers to the "body mandala" practice in which the adept visualizes the three wheels of the mandala within his/her own body."

Gray writes that the name of Samvara has an ancient lineage. A figure called Śamvara can be found in the Rig Veda, as an enemy of Indra and as a kind of asura. Asko Parpola has argued that Samvara and other similar deities which are associated with the power of illusion (maya) are remnants of pre-Aryan cults. Gray writes that there may have been an asura cult that the Buddhists drew from in their development of "new cults of deities who were viewed as manifesting hostility to the classical Hindu deities such as Maheśvara and Narayana, just as the asura were the perpetual foes of the older vedic deities such as Indra." In this, they may have also been influenced by Puranic sources which portrayed the Buddhist "heresy" as a trick meant to deceive the asuras.

Regarding the name Heruka, it first appears as a name for a class of fierce demon like beings. Heruka also appears as a charnel ground deity which is said to be "the guise assumed by the Buddha Vajradhara in his effort to subdue evil doers," in the Samayoga Tantra. In the Samayoga, the universe is being destroyed by evil beings (stirred up by Mara), and all the Hindu deities in the universe seek refuge in Supreme Buddha Vajradhara, who assembles all the Buddhas. Since these evil beings are not able to be subdued by peaceful means, the Buddhas must manifest ferocious appearances. Heruka is born from Vajradhara Buddha's transcendent power and he burns up the entire universe, purifying it in the process.

Gray writes that eventually this earlier myth of Heruka's origin evolved into a more polemical version, in which Heruka is born to subdue Shaiva deities, like Rudra and Mahabhairava, which are here seen as the source of the cosmic disorder. This was probably influenced by another myth in which Shiva is subdued by Vajrapāṇi in the Tattvasaṃgraha An Indian version of this myth can be found in Indrabhuti's commentary and is cited by Gray. In it, Vajrapāṇi forces Mahadeva, i.e. Shiva (along with a host of deities) to appear in Akanishtha ( Highest Realm of Rūpadhātu lokas), whereupon he is annihilated when he refuses to turn from his evil ways. Then Vajrapāṇi revives Mahadeva with his mantric power, and Shiva then becomes a Buddha in the Future, known as "Bhasmeśvara", included in Kāraṇḍavyūha Sūtra. 47-48 Then the myth also tells of how Vajradhara Buddha created body known as Śrī Heruka in order to subdue Bhairava and Kalaratri who had taken over the world with their hateful and lustful ways. Heruka takes Bhairava's form and sends out various deities to subdue and destroy Bhairava and his associated deities. These Buddhist deities then take the form of the Bhairava deities as a skillful means (upaya).

According to David Gray,

This myth represents the adoption of non-Buddhist elements while at the same time representing the subordination of these elements within a Buddhist cosmic hierarchy, graphically represented by the placement of the Saiva deities under the feet of their Buddhist vanquisher. The myth provides an elaborate fourfold scheme for this process of the appropriation and subordination of a non-Buddhist tradition.

Samvara is one of the principal yidam or meditational deities of the Sarma schools of Tibetan Buddhism. Samvara is typically depicted with a blue-coloured body, four faces, and twelve arms, and embracing his consort, the wisdom dakini Vajravārāhī (a.k.a. Vajrayoginī) in Yab-Yum (sexual union). Other forms of the deities are also known with varying numbers of limbs and features, such as a two armed version. According to the Buddhist Tantric scholar Abhayakaragupta, the deity's mandala is described thus:

In the Samvara mandala there is a variegated lotus atop Mount Sumeru within an adamantine tent (vajrapañjara). Placed on it is a double vajra, which sits as the base of a court in the middle of which is the Blessed Lord. He stands in the archer (alidha) stance on Bhairava and Kalaratri who lie on a solar disk atop the pericarp of the lotus. He is black and has four faces which are, beginning with the front [and continuing around counter-clockwise], black, green, red, and yellow, each of which has three eyes. He has a tiger skin and has twelve arms. Two arms holding a vajra and a vajra-bell embrace Vajravarahi. Two of his hands hold up over his back a white elephant hide dripping with blood. His other [right hands hold] a damaru drum, an axe, a flaying knife (kartri), and a trident. His remaining left [hands hold] a khatvanga staff marked with a vajra, a skull-bowl filled with blood, a vajra noose, and the head of Brahma. A garland of fifty moist human heads hangs about his neck. He has the six insignia, and a sacred thread made of human sinew. He has a row of five skulls above his forehead, and a crest of black dreadlocks topped by a left-oriented crescent moon and a double vajra. He is endowed with a fierce meditative state (vikrtadhyana) and bears his fangs. He brings together in one the nine dramatic sentiments (navarasa).

== Practices ==
As Gray writes, the tantra's cryptic and obscure chapters mostly focus on "the description of rites such as the production of the mandala, the consecration ceremonies performed within it, as well as various other ritual actions such as homa fire sacrifices, enchantment with mantras, and so forth. Moreover, like many tantras, and perhaps more than most, it omits information necessary for the performance of these rituals. It also often obscures crucial elements, particularly the mantras, which the text typically presents in reverse order, or which it codes via an elaborate scheme in which both the vowels and consonants are coded by number."

The reason for the text's obscurity is mostly likely that these rites were considered secret and one was supposed to receive instructions on them from one's guru after initiation. It is therefore difficult to understand the tantra's practices without relying on a commentary and/or a teacher.

== The Cakrasaṃvara literature ==
There are three genres of Cakrasaṃvara literature: "explanatory tantras" (vyakhyatantra); commentaries; and ritual literature (sadhanas, mandala manuals, initiation manuals). The explanatory tantras refers to independent tantras that are seen as being part of the Cakrasaṃvara cycle.

The main explanatory tantras (given by Buton Rinchen Drub) are: the Abhidhānottara, the Vajradāka; Ḍākārṇava, Herukābhyudaya, Yoginīsaṃcāra, Samvarodaya, Caturyoginīsaṃpuṭa; Vārāhī-abhisambodhi, and the Sampuṭa Tantra. Most of these texts show no internal evidence they consider themselves as subsidiary to the root Cakrasaṃvara Tantra, and it is likely they were grouped into this category by the later tradition. Furthermore, it seems the root Cakrasaṃvara Tantra is not as important in the Newari tradition, which instead privileges the Samvarodaya.

The main Indian commentaries to the root tantra are:

- Jayabhadra of Laṅka (early to mid 9th century scholar at Vikramashila), Śrī-cakrasaṃvara-mūla-tantra-pañjikā. The oldest, word-for-word commentary. It survives in two Sanskrit manuscripts and Tibetan translation.
- Kambala (possibly 9th century), Sādhana-nidāna-nāma-śrī-cakrasaṃvara-pañjikā. This is another early commentary that was very influential and relied upon by various later authors.
- Bhavabhaṭṭa (late 9th century scholar at Vikramashila), Śrī-cakrasaṃvara-pañjikā-nāma. This is a larger work which relies on Jayabhadra but also sometimes contradicts him. It also replies older Shaiva readings with more Buddhist oriented ones.
- Devagupta's Commentary which is basically an expansion of Kambala's
- Bhavyakīrti (early 10th century scholar at Vikramashila), Śrī-cakrasaṃvarasya-pañjikā-śūramanojñā-nāma. This is a shorter and more conservative commentary which stays closer to the Jayabhadra commentary.
- Durjayacandra (late 10th century scholar at Vikramashila), Ratnagaṇa-nāma-pañjikā. This commentary is particularly important for the Sakya school since it was used by Rinchen Zangpo.
- Tathāgatarakṣita (scholar at Vikramashila), Ubhayanibandha-nāma
- Indrabuti's Commentary which relies on Kambala's
- Vīravajra's two 11th-century commentaries. Gray states that "They are very sophisticated works, and represent a high point of Indian tantric Buddhist scholarship. His commentaries are also among the most thorough. He relies both upon Jayabhadra and Kambala, as well as Bhavabhaṭṭa and Durjayacandra, and he is also quite erudite, quoting from a number of other sources, including Yogacara texts and a number of other tantras."
- *Śāśvatavajra (rtag pa'i rdo rje)'s śrī-tattvaviśadā-nāma-śrīsaṃvara-vṛitti, translated in the 14th century by Buton.

There are also several Tibetan commentaries, including those of Sachen Kunga Nyingpo (1092-1158), Buton (1290-1364), and Tsongkhapa (1357-1419).

== Gallery ==
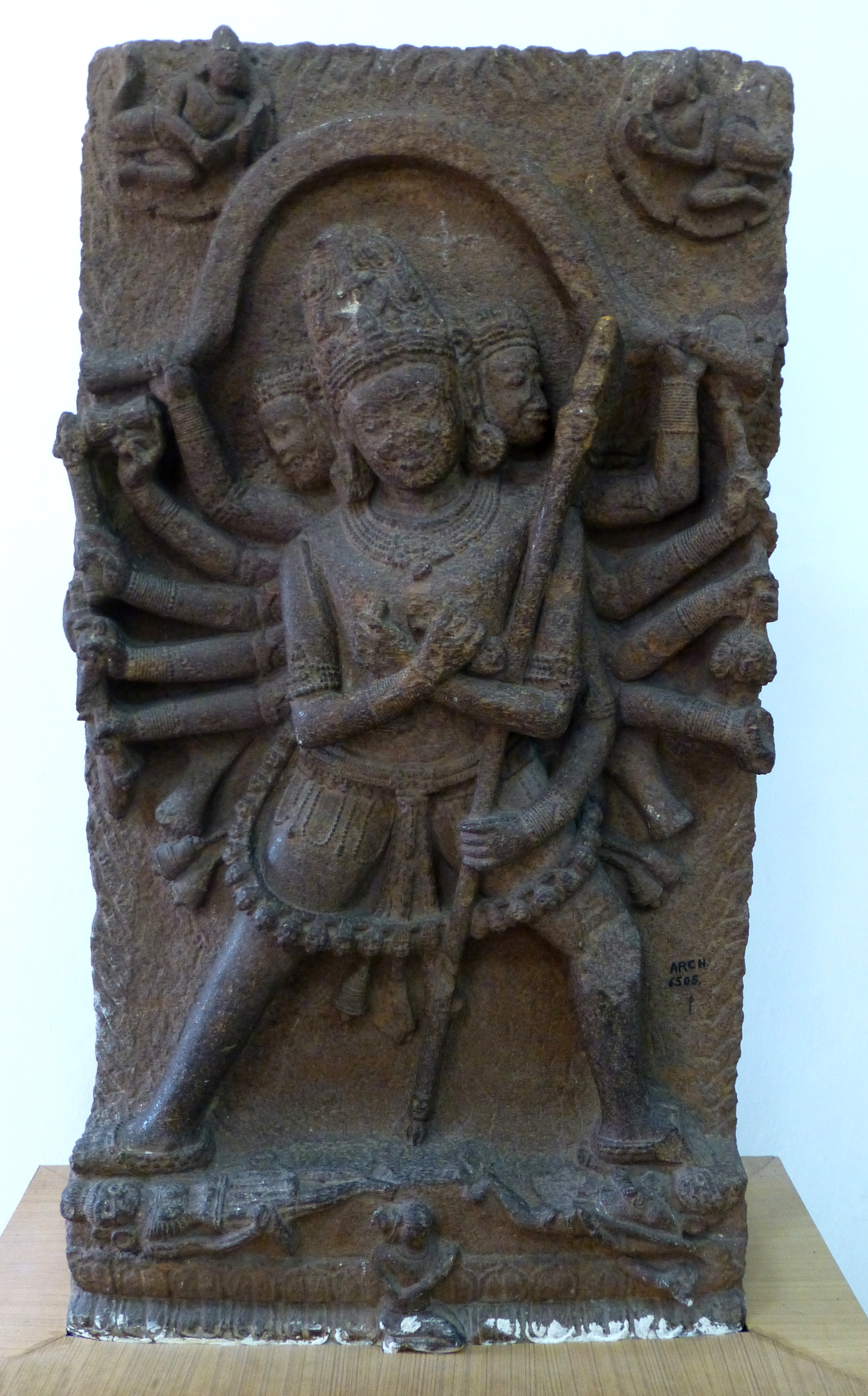
Saṃvara 10th century, Ratnagiri, at the Patna Museum, Bihar

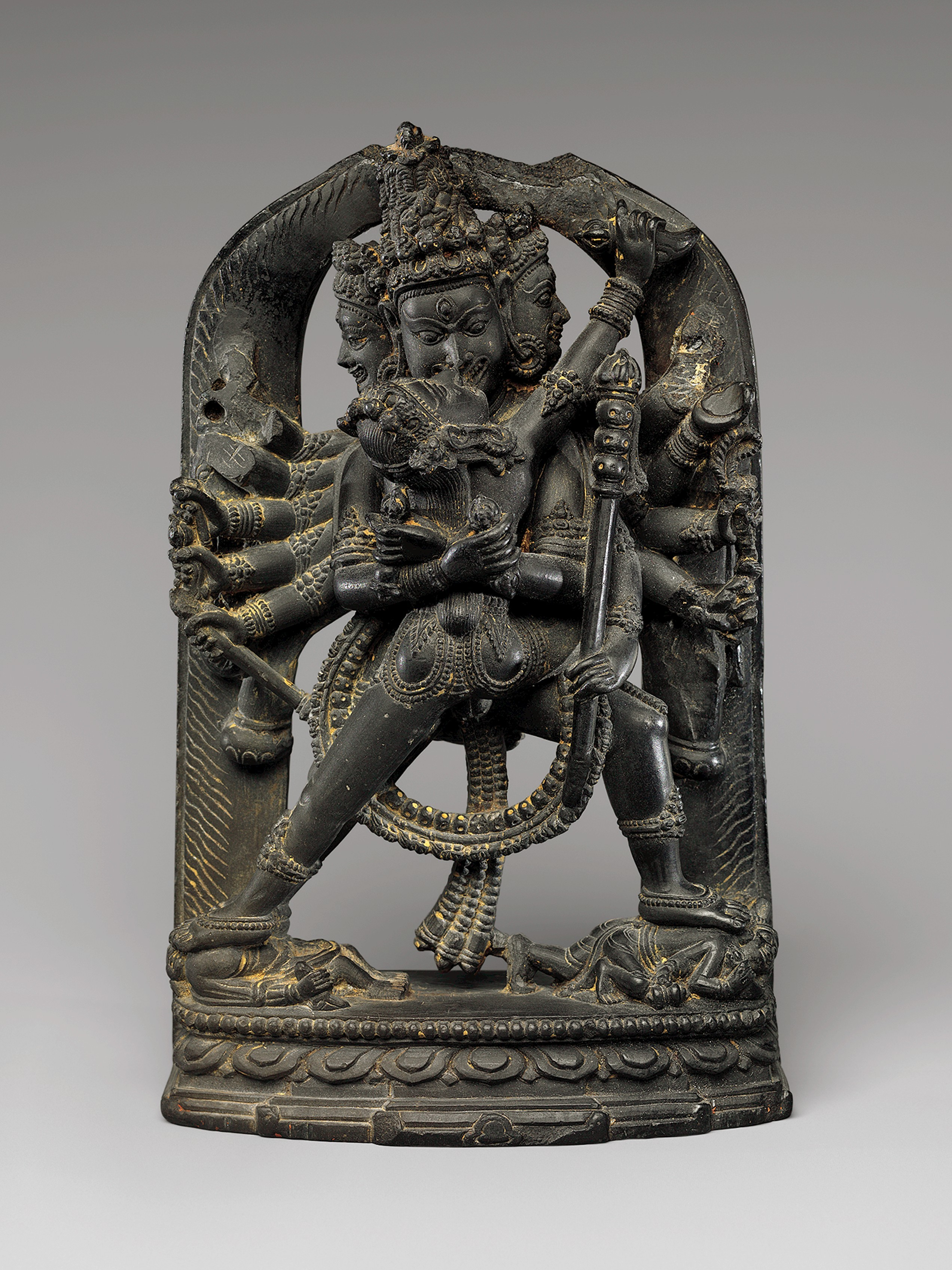
Statue of Saṃvara, 12th century, Bengal

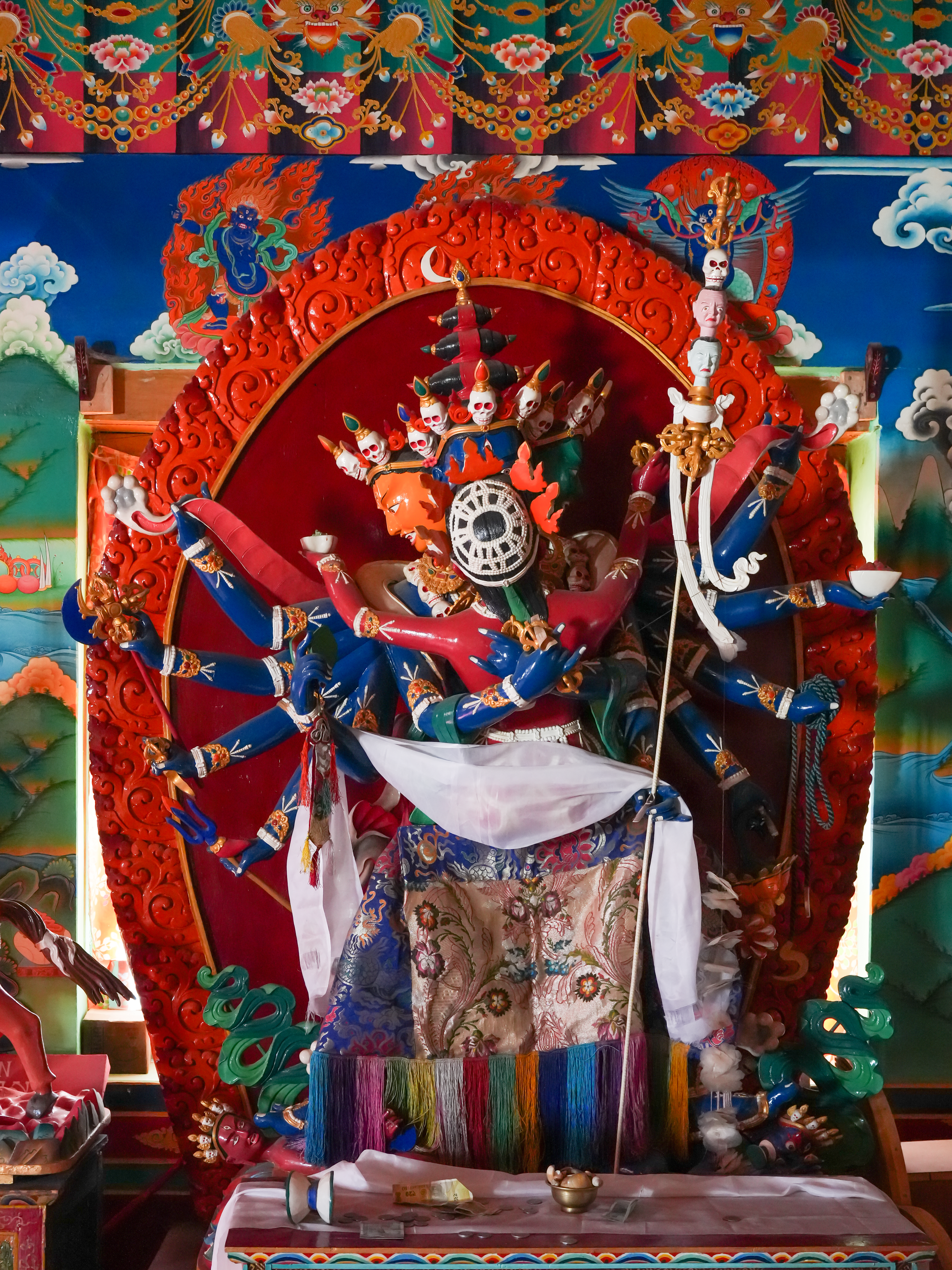
Cakrasaṃvara statue, Stakrimo Gompa, Padum, Zanskar

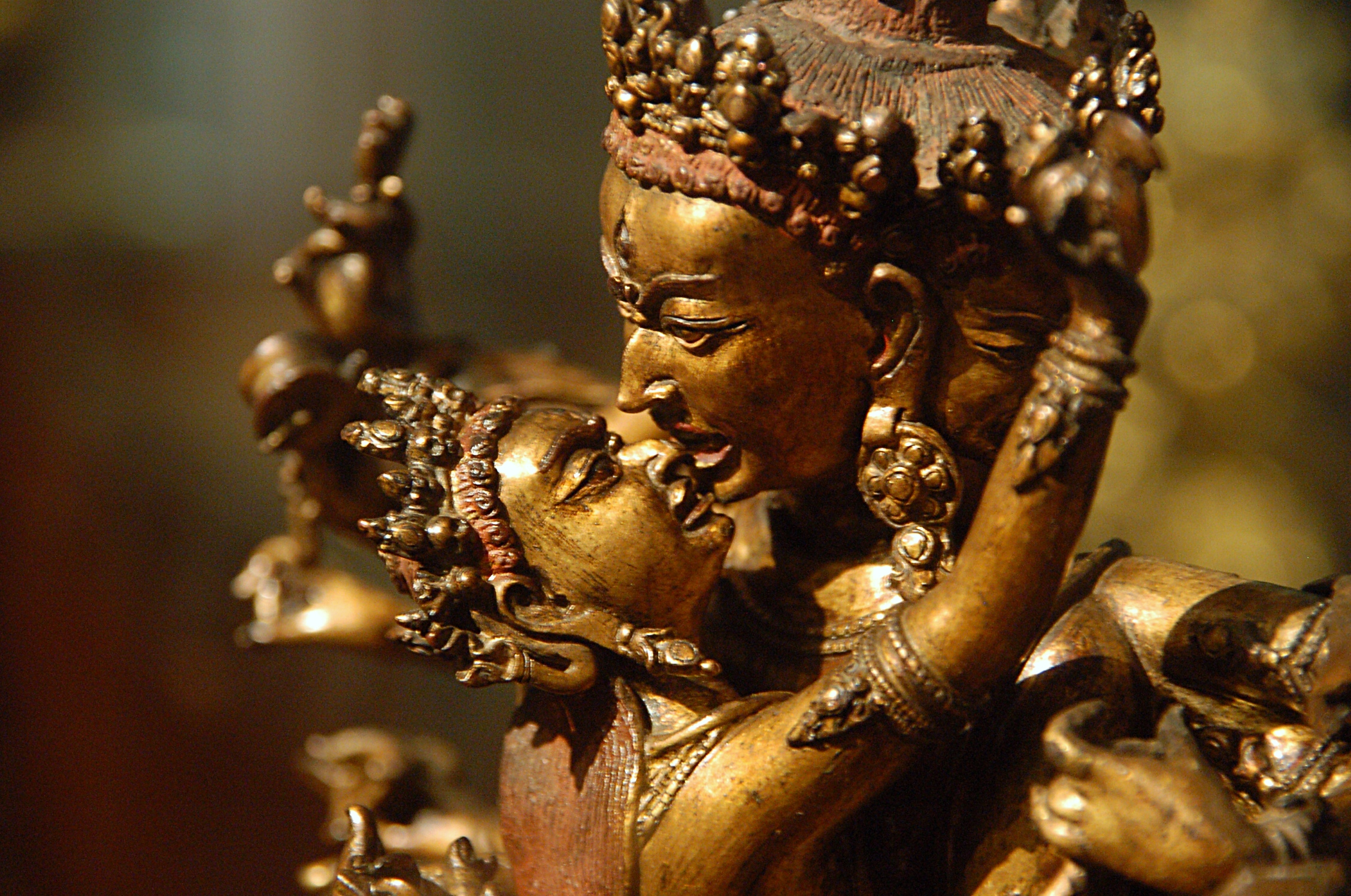
Closeup of a statue of the deities, Musée Guimet

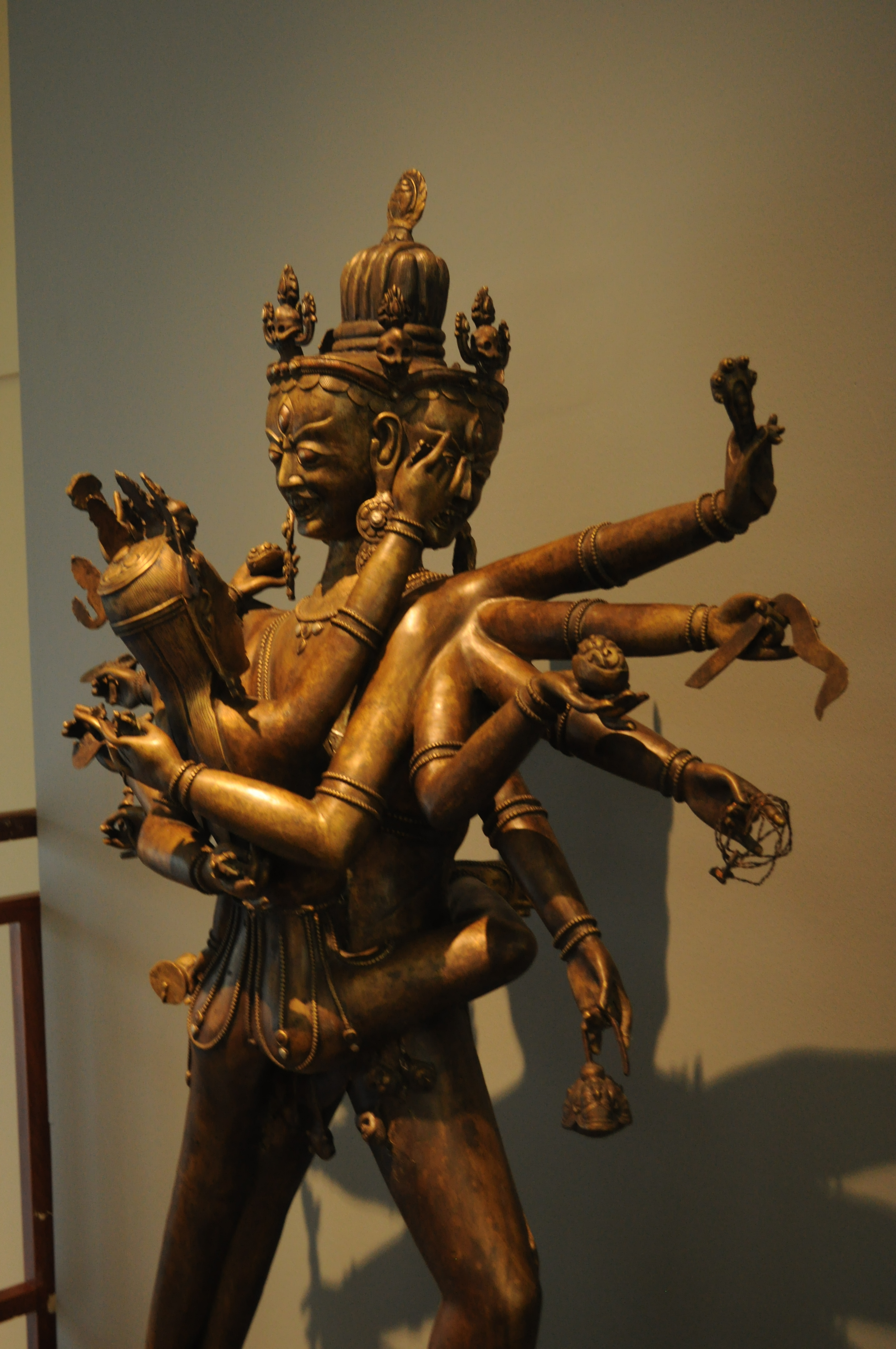
Cakrasaṃvara, Western Tibet, late 19th century or earlier, copper alloy with inlay of silver and copper, and applied gold paint.

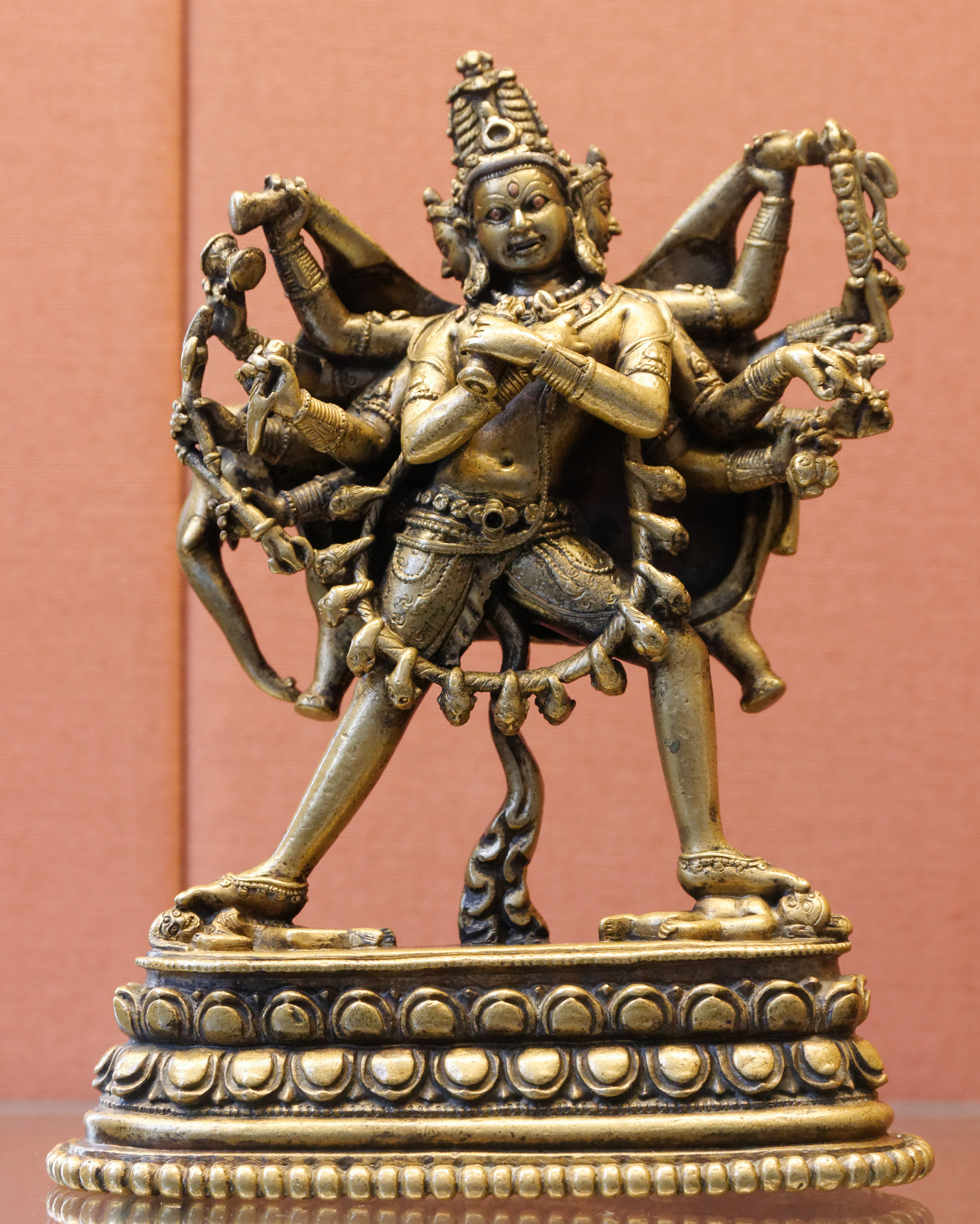
12th century Cakrasaṃvara statue, bronze and silver and copper inlay

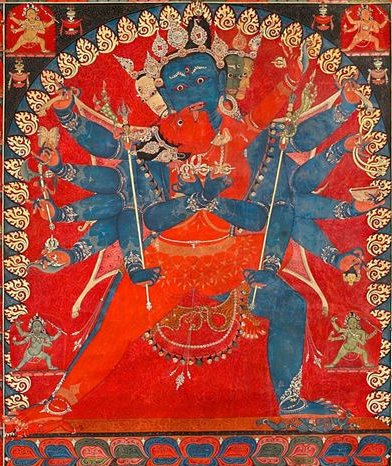
Saṃvara, Central Tibet circa 1400

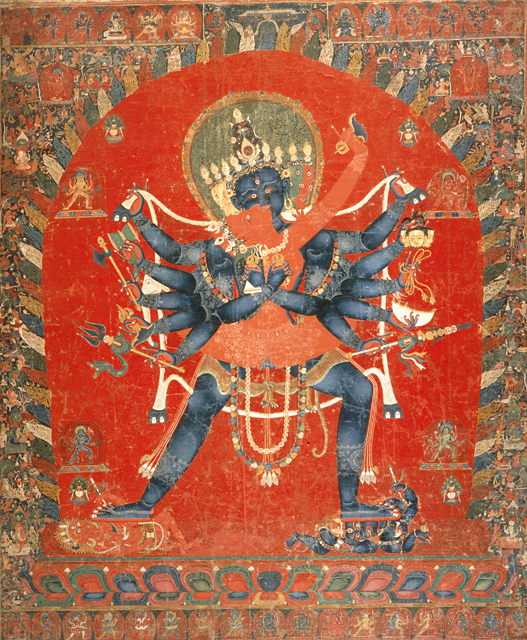
Cakrasaṃvara painting

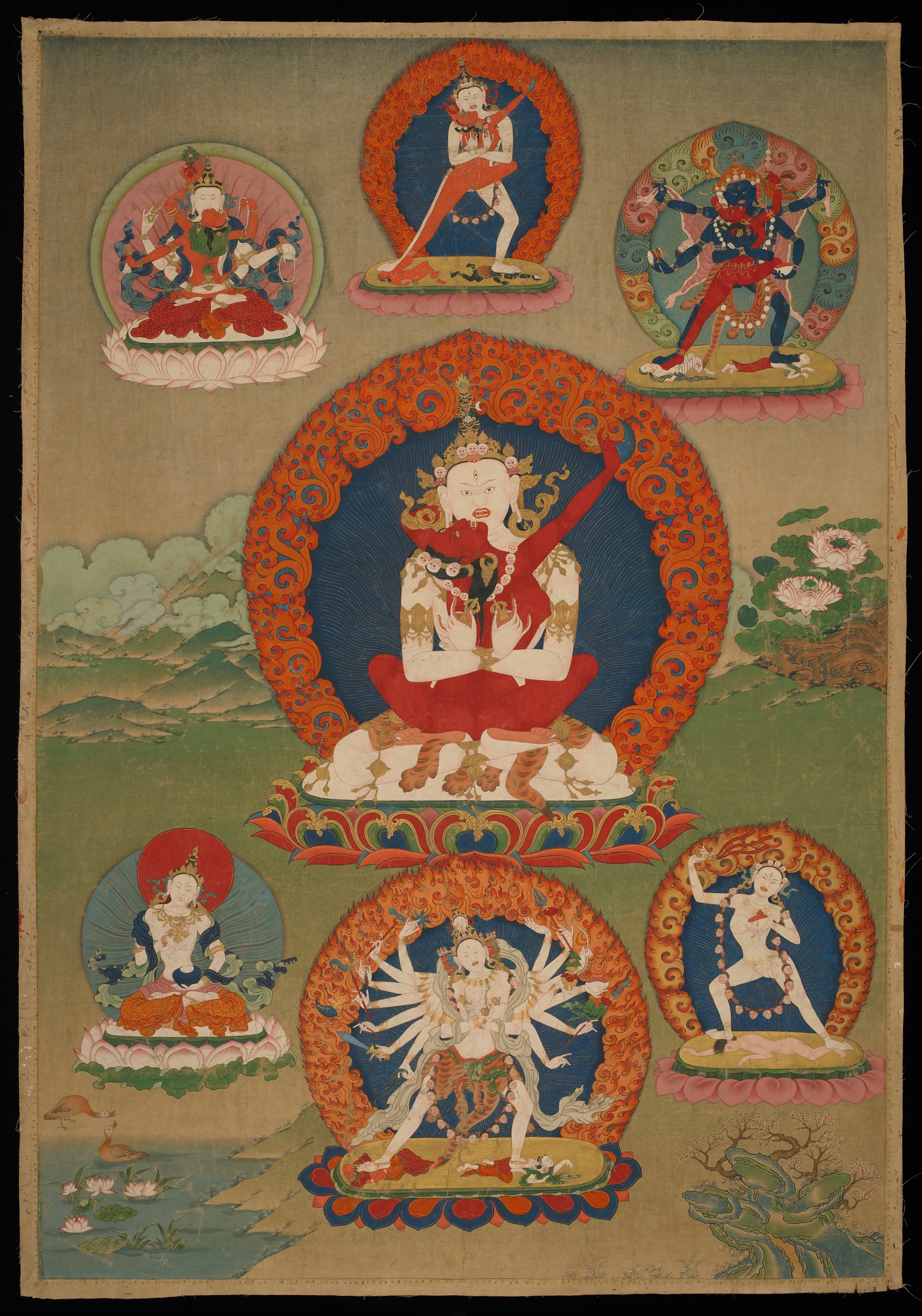
Cakrasaṃvara, 18th-century painting, Rubin Museum of Art

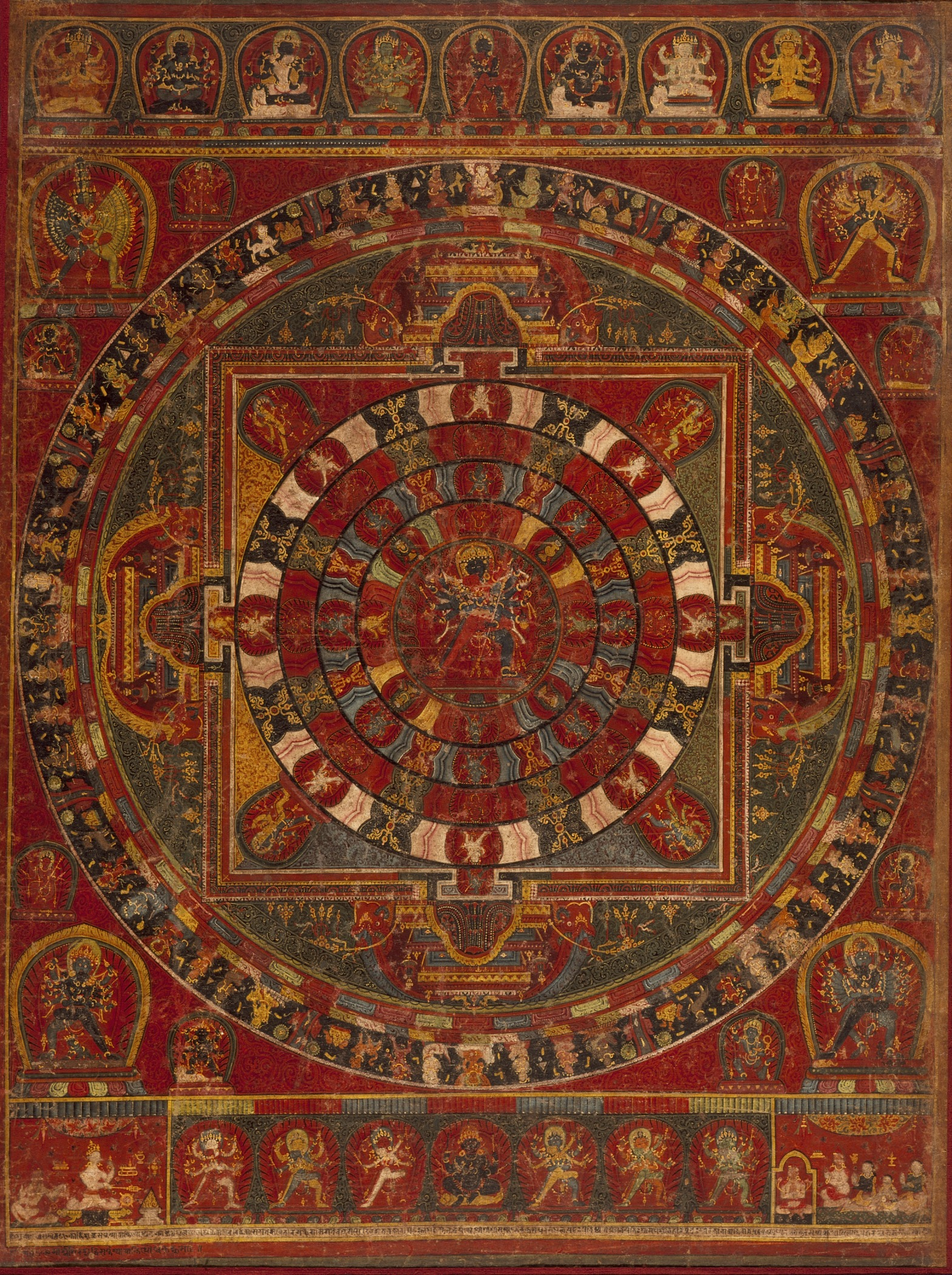
Cakrasaṃvara mandala, Nepalese painting from 1490

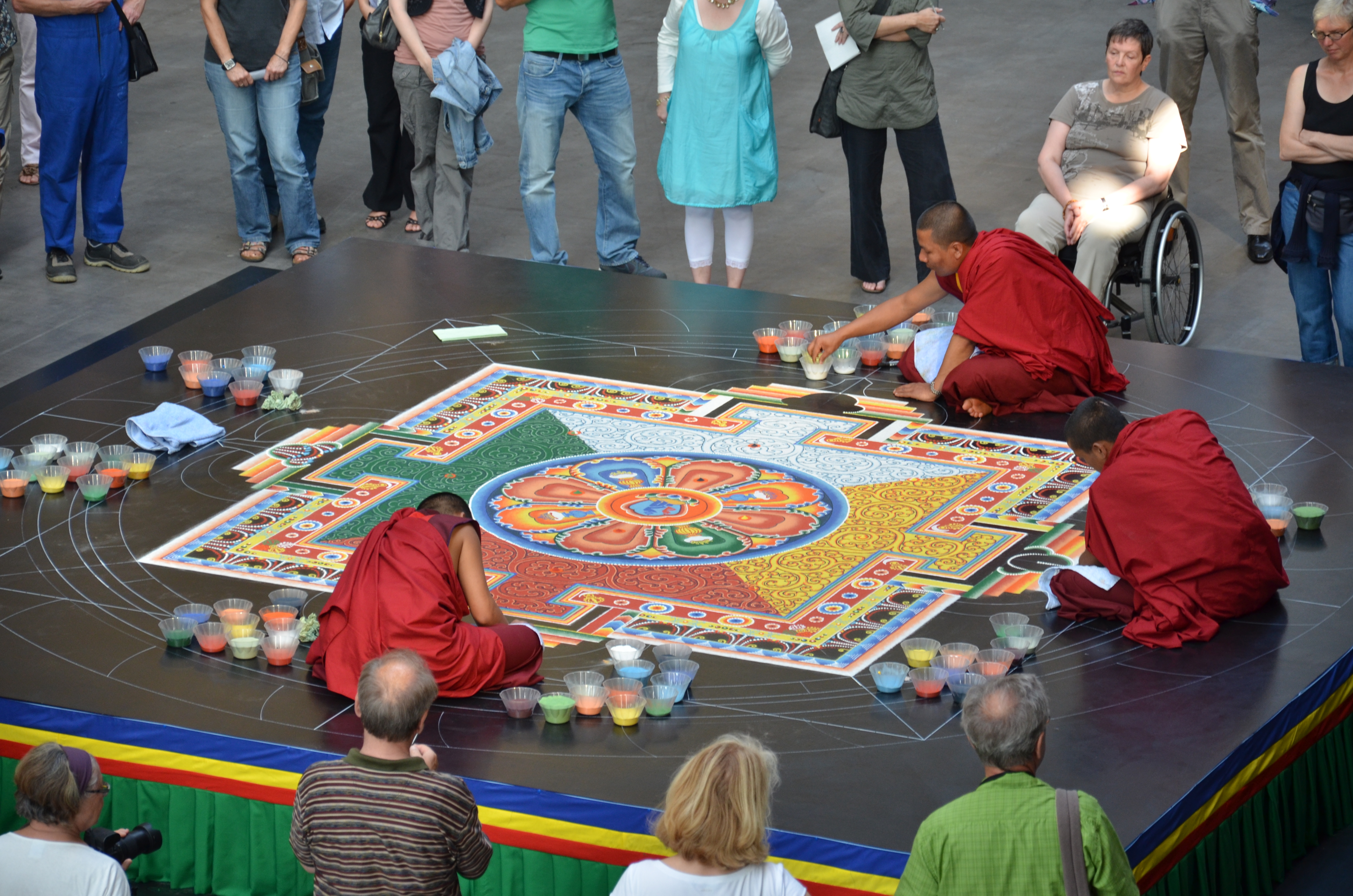
Cakrasaṃvara sand mandala, Bochum, 2011

== See also ==
- Guhyagarbha Tantra
- Guhyasamāja Tantra
- Hevajra Tantra
- Kashmir Shaivism
