= Three Jewels and Three Roots =

Outer, inner, secret, and ultimate Buddhist refuge formulations

Symbol of the Three Jewels

In Tibetan Buddhism, the Three Jewels and Three Roots are supports in which a Buddhist takes refuge by means of a prayer or recitation at the beginning of the day or of a practice session. The Three Jewels are the first and the Three Roots are the second set of three Tibetan Buddhist refuge formulations, the Outer, Inner and Secret forms of the Three Jewels. The 'Outer' form is the 'Triple Gem' (Sanskrit: triratna), the 'Inner' is the Three Roots and the 'Secret' form is the 'Three Bodies' or trikāya of a Buddha.

These are:

- the Buddha, the fully enlightened one
- the Dharma, the teachings expounded by the Buddha
- the Saṅgha, the monastic order of Buddhism that practice the Dharma
- the Lama (Sanskrit: guru) is the 'root of blessing' or 'root of grace'
- the Yidam (Sanskrit: ishtadevata) is the 'root of methods' or 'root of accomplishments'
- the Dakini or Dharmapala is the 'root of activity' or 'root of protection'.

The additional refuge formulations are employed by those undertaking deity yoga and other tantric practices within the Tibetan Buddhist Vajrayana tradition as a means of recognizing the universality of Buddha Nature. The Three Roots are commonly mentioned in the Nyingma and Kagyu literature of Tibetan Buddhism. Unlike most aspects of Tibetan Buddhism, which originated in India, the Three Roots may be an original Tibetan formulation from the time of Padmasambhava.

== Individual Jewels ==
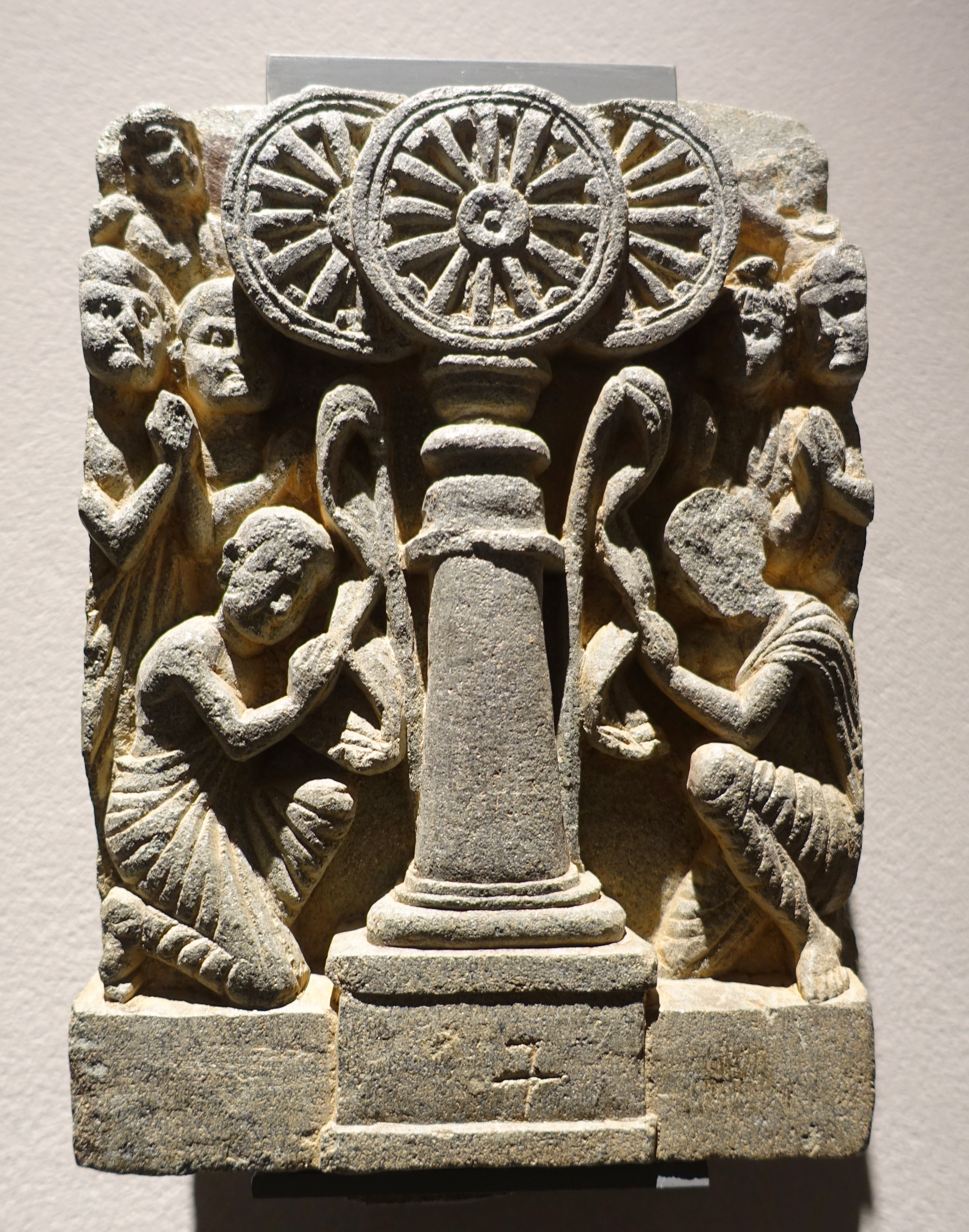
Veneration of the Three Jewels, Chorasan, Gandhara, 2nd century AD, schist – Ethnological Museum of Berlin

=== Buddha ===
Lord Buddha is the Enlightened One who discovered the Ultimate Path to release clinging and craving and liberation from the cycle of birth and rebirth.

=== Dharma ===
For practising Buddhists, references to "Dharma" (Dhamma in Pali) particularly as "the dharma", generally means the teachings of the Buddha, commonly known throughout the East as Buddhadharma. It includes especially the discourses on the fundamental principles (such as the Four Noble Truths and the Noble Eightfold Path), as opposed to the parables and to the poems.

=== Saṅgha ===
The Saṅgha is the third of the Three Refuges. Common over all schools is that the āryasaṅgha is the foremost form of this third jewel. As for recognizable current-life forms, the interpretation of what is the Jewel depends on how a school defines Saṅgha. For example, for many schools, monastic life is considered to provide the safest and most suitable environment for advancing toward enlightenment and liberation due to the temptations and vicissitudes of life in the world.

== Vajrayana and Dzogchen formulations ==
Dilgo Khyentse, head of the Nyingma school of Tibetan Buddhism until his death in 1991, explained the twilight language correspondences and meaning of the Outer, Inner and Secret aspects of the Three Jewels:

The outer three jewels are the Buddha, Dharma, and Saṅgha. The Three jewels have an inner aspect, known as the Three Roots: the Guru (or Teacher), who is the root of blessings; the Yidam, who is the root of accomplishment; and the Dakini, who is the root of enlightened activity. Although the names are different, these three do not in any way differ from the Three Jewels. The Guru is the Budha [sic], the Yidam is the Dharma, and the Dakinis and Protectors are the Saṅgha. And on the innermost level, the dharmakāya is the Buddha, the saṃbhogakāya is the Dharma, and the nirmāṇakāya is the Saṅgha.

	Buddhist Vajrayana Refuge Formulations		
Outer ('Triple Gem')	Buddha	Dharma	Saṅgha
Inner ('Three Roots')	Lama	Yidam	Dharmapala and Dakini
Secret	Nadi	Prana	Bindu
Ultimate	Dharmakāya	Saṃbhogakāya	Nirmāṇakāya

The Three Roots formulation also fits into the framework of the Trikāya ('three bodies') of a Buddha where they are seen as equating to the following forms: the protector is the body, the yidam is the Speech and the lama is the mind. According to the Handbook of Tibetan Buddhist Symbols:

The trinity of body, speech, and mind are known as the three gates, three receptacles or three vajras, and correspond to the western religious concept of righteous thought (mind), word (speech), and deed (body). The three vajras also correspond to the three kāyas, with the aspect of body located at the crown (nirmāṇakāya), the aspect of speech at the throat (saṃbhogakāya), and the aspect of mind at the heart (dharmakāya).

Pabongkhapa Déchen Nyingpo also identifies the seed syllables corresponding to the Three Vajras as: a white om (enlightened body), a red ah (enlightened speech) and a blue hum (enlightened mind).

Three refuge motivation levels are:

- suffering rebirth's fear motivates with the idea of happiness,
- knowing rebirth won’t bring freedoms motivates attaining nirvana, while
- seeing other’s suffering motivates establishing them all in Buddhahood.

Happiness is temporary, lifetimes are impermanent and ultimately refuge is taken until reaching unsurpassable awakening.

=== Individual Roots ===
==== Lama ====
In the Theravada Buddhist tradition, the teacher is a valued and honoured mentor worthy of great respect and a source of inspiration on the path to Enlightenment. In the Tibetan tradition, however, the teacher is viewed as the very root of spiritual realization and the basis of the entire path. Without the teacher, it is asserted, there can be no experience or insight. The lama is seen as Buddha. In Tibetan texts, emphasis is placed upon praising the virtues of the lama. Tantric teachings include generating visualisations of the lama and making offerings praising the lama. The lama becomes known as the vajra (literally "diamond") guru, the one who is the source of initiation into the tantric deity. The disciple is asked to enter into a series of vows and commitments that ensure the maintenance of the spiritual link with the understanding that to break this link is a serious downfall.

In Vajrayana (tantric Buddhism) the lama is perceived as the way itself. The lama is not an individual who initiates a person, but the person's own Buddha-nature reflected in the personality of the lama. In return, disciples are expected to show great devotion to the lama, whom they regard as a Bodhisattva. A lama is one who has not only mastered the words of the tradition, but who has an intense personal relationship with the student; thus, devotion is the proper attitude toward the guru.

The Dalai Lama, speaking of the importance of the lama, said: "Rely on the teachings to evaluate a guru: Do not have blind faith, but also no blind criticism." He also observed that the term 'living Buddha' is a translation of the Chinese words huo fuo.

The lama, who in Tibetan Buddhism is generally the lama, is considered to be the most important of the 'Three Roots' since the lama embodies enlightened mind and without their personal guidance, the student cannot progress. "The living teacher proclaims to the student through his or her very existence that awakening is not only possible but immediate for every living being". Through guru yoga practices, the Vajrayana student becomes familiar with the refuge tree and lineage within which the lama is teaching. The tsawe lama ('root guru') with whom the student has a personal relationship, is visualised at the root of the tree, channeling the blessings of all the branches of the refuge tree to the student. The blessings are accessed through the practitioner's devotion.

==== Yidam ====
The second root is the meditational deity or yidam. The iconography of the yidam may be 'peaceful', 'wrathful' (Tibetan tro wa) or 'neither peaceful or wrathful'(Tibetan: shi ma tro), depending on the practitioner's own nature. The yidam represents awakening, so its appearance reflects whatever is required by the practitioner to awaken. The lama guides the student to the yidam appropriate for them, then gives them initiation into the mandala of the yidam. In essence, the mind of the lama and the yidam are one. The yidam is considered to be the root of success in the practice.

==== Dakini or dharmapala ====
The third root is the dakini or dharmapala ('dharma protector'), the root of action or the enlightened activity of realized beings.

In the case of the Nyingma school of Tibetan Buddhism the protector is the dakini. The dakini is guardian of the secret oral or 'whispered ear' tradition and so always serves as the third root.

In the other 'Sarma' schools, the protector may be a dakini, a dharmapala, or other Buddhist enlightened beings. There are many different forms of protector. The protector in these schools may be a dakini or any of a variety of oath-bound protectors, subdued by the tantric yogi or yogini.

Judith Simmer-Brown points out that:

The dakini, in various guises, serves as each of the Three Roots, and may be a human guru, a vajra master who transmits the Vajrayana teachings to her disciples and joins them in samaya commitments. The wisdom dakini may be a yidam, a meditational deity; female deity yogas such as Vajrayogini are common in Tibetan Buddhism. Or, the dakini may be a protector; the wisdom dakinis have special power and responsibility to protect the integrity of oral transmissions.

=== In specific traditions ===
==== Yangzab ====
In the Yangzab compilation of Dzogchen texts the 'Yangzab Three Roots' is the primary deity yoga practice. The Three Roots in this cycle are: Padmasambhava (the lama), Hayagriva (the yidam), and Vajravarahi (the dakini). This empowerment is required for the practitioner to study the Yangzab Treasure teaching cycle. The three roots are symbolized in the Gankyil.
