= Karmamudrā =

Vajrayana Buddhist practice

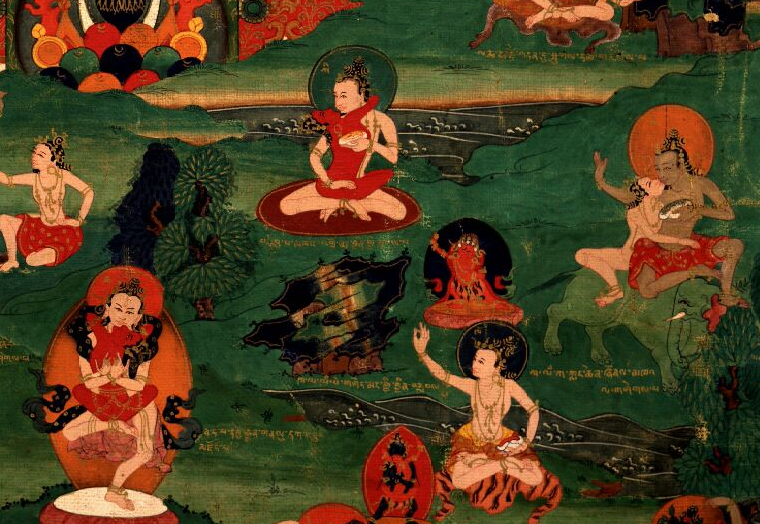
Tibetan painting depicting Indian Buddhist Mahasiddhas and yoginis practicing karmamudrā

Karmamudrā (Sanskrit; "action seal," Tibetan: las-kyi phyag-rgya; commonly misspelled as: kāmamudrā or "desire seal") is a Vajrayana Buddhist technique which makes use of sexual union with a physical or visualized consort as well as the practice of inner heat (tummo) to achieve a non-dual state of bliss and insight into emptiness. In Tibetan Buddhism, proficiency in inner heat yoga is generally seen as a prerequisite to the practice of karmamudrā.

Karmamudrā also specifically refers to the female yogini who engages in such a practice. When the partner is a visualised one (i.e. imagined by a single yogi in Tibetan tantric practice), it is known as a jñanamudra ("wisdom seal").

== Purpose of practice ==
Tantra uses skillful means to transform what could tie a practitioner to samsara into a spiritually liberative practice. Judith Simmer-Brown explains how karmamudra can be used to explore the nature of passion:

There are traditionally three ways to realise the nature of passion in the yogic tradition of Tantra. First in creation-phase practice one can visualise the yidams as yab-yum in sexual union... Second one can practice tummo (caṇḍalī) or the generation of internal heat through the subtle body practices of the vital breath moving into the central channel. Third, one can practice so-called sexual yoga (karmamudra, lekyi chagya) with a consort. Realising the true nature of passion in all of these forms transforms ordinary passion into the basis for the experience of great bliss (mahasukha), which greatly accelerates the removal of emotional and mental obscurations in one's practice.

Early masters of the Six Yogas of Naropa, placed great emphasis on karmamudra practice, with some giving it separate status as one of the six yogas whilst others saw it as an aspect of the inner heat yoga. This sadhana is a part of the Lamdre system of the Sakya school, the Kalachakra tantra central to the Gelug school and Anuyoga as practised by the Nyingma school.

== Necessity of consort ==
According to most Tibetan Buddhist teachers, a physical consort (karmamudra) is necessary in order to attain enlightenment in this lifetime. For example modern day Gelug teachers such as Thubten Yeshe have made statements supporting this view. However, some lamas disagree. For example, the current Dalai Lama refers to a commentary on the abbreviated Kalachakra tantra by Kaydrub Norzang-gyatso that says practitioners of especially sharp faculties can achieve the same objectives with solely a jnanamudra partner. He concludes that therefore "it is not absolutely mandatory to rely on a physical karmamudra partner".

== Qualifications for practice ==
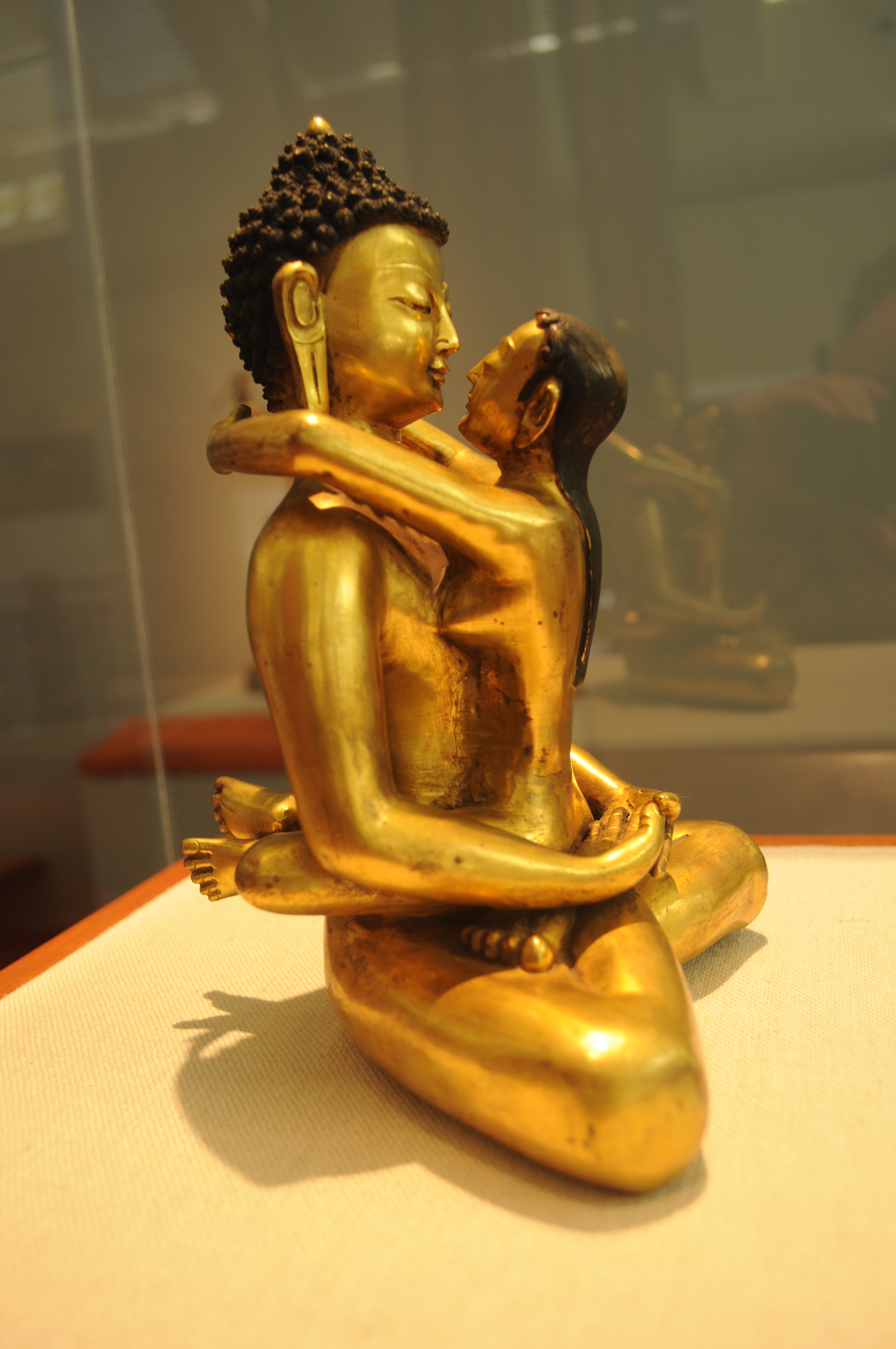
Statue of the AdiBuddha Samantabhadra in union with Samantabhadri

In the 'new' schools of Tibetan Buddhism a practitioner of the three lower classes of tantra is restricted to visualisation of a consort (jnanamudra). Initiation into one of the anuttarayoga tantras allows sexual practice with a karmamudra.

All Vajrayana traditions agree that qualified lay practitioners, including former monks who have renounced their vows, can use physical consorts as the Vajrayana founders did. For example, Atisa wrote that "Those [consecrations] on which the householder may rely include everything taught in the tantras." There are different stances on whether current monks can engage in the practice. The Buddhist scholar Tripitakamala felt the overall goal of Buddhahood overrides concerns for monastic vows.

== History ==
Tantra rose to prominence during the Pala Empire period in medieval India. Tantric Buddhism provided an alternative to the monastic solitary techniques to pursue enlightenment whereby it could be pursued through intimacy with another person. According to Miranda Shaw, the increased social inclusiveness of Tantra allowed the voices of women to emerge through their roles as karmamudra. Shaw details 16 known instances of women teaching male practitioners through secret oral instruction and notes that several of the 7 tantric texts accepted by the Tibetans in the 8th century as fundamental tantric works were written by women.

== Controversy ==
Judith Simmer-Brown notes that in Tibet there was a strong tradition among yogi outside the monastic communities of the practice of karmamudra. She states that these were primarily non-celibate practitioners such as terton, ngagpa and hereditary lamas within the Nyingma and Kagyu schools. However, she notes, their lifestyles sometimes scandalised the monastic communities, particularly those of the Gelug, who valued strict monastic discipline.

Vipassana teacher Jack Kornfield quotes one unnamed female Buddhist teacher, wherein she talks about an old, realized lama choosing a thirteen- to fourteen-year-old nun to become his sexual consort every year. After talking to "a number of Western women who had slept with their lamas" this same unnamed individual concludes the practice benefited only the lamas.

Academic, feminist and former Kagyu nun June Campbell has spoken about women acting as karmamudra in secret sexual relationships with lamas, including one she says she had when she was in her late twenties with the incarnation of Kalu Rinpoche who died in 1989. In an interview with Tricycle: The Buddhist Review she states that at the time she did not feel exploited but thinking about it over the years she came to see the demand for secrecy combined with an imbalance of power as similar to the techniques used by child abusers.

== See also ==
- Padmasambhava – 8th-century Buddhist lama
- Yeshe Tsogyal – First female lama in Tibetan Buddhism
