= Lama =

Title in Tibetan Buddhism

Lama (Tibetan: བླ་མ་, Wylie: bla-ma) is a title bestowed to a realized practitioner of the Dharma in Tibetan Buddhism. Not all monks are lamas, while nuns and female practitioners can be recognized and entitled as lamas. The Tibetan word la-ma means "high mother", and reflects the qualities of the person who is called a lama.

Historically and currently, the term is bestowed on venerated spiritual masters and may be part of a specific lineage title such as the Dalai Lama and the Panchen Lama, lineages of reincarnate high Tulkus.

The title has wrongly applied to all ordained monks and Bhikshus due to misunderstandings by western scholars such as Melvyn Goldstein, the term lama has recently been erroneously applied to Tibetan monks in general. Similarly, Tibetan Buddhism was erroneously referred to as "Lamaism" and "Lamaist" by Goldstein and early western scholars, and by European travelers who did not understand that what they were witnessing was Tibetan Buddhism. The term Lamaism is now considered by some to be derogatory.

In the Vajrayana of Tibetan Buddhism, a lama can be a tantric spiritual guide, or a guru to an aspiring Buddhist student, or a yogi or yogini. As such, the lama/guru can be seen as one of the Three Roots, a variant of the Three Jewels, alongside the yidam the dakini. The dharmapala are protector deities.

According to specific lineages, the mind of the lama is considered the Buddha – one's highest potential; the lama's speech is dharma; and the lama's body is one's guide and companion on the way to enlightenment -the sangha. This means that the lama/guru is the perfect embodiment of the Three Jewels. Another expression of a lama can be expressed through the three Kayas.

== See also ==
- Bhikkhu
- Khenpo
- Rinpoche
- Rōshi
- Sensei
- Shifu
