= Martin Stuart-Fox =

Australian professor and foreign correspondent

Martin Stuart-Fox FAHA (born 1939) is a retired Australian professor and foreign correspondent who writes about the history, politics and international relations of Southeast Asia, primarily Laos.

After studying biological sciences at the University of Queensland, Martin Stuart-Fox worked as a marine biologist in Papua New Guinea, then taught science in Hong Kong. In 1963 he was employed by the U.S. Agency for International Development as an agricultural extension officer in Laos. There he began reporting for United Press International, initially as a stringer and then as a staff correspondent. In 1965 UPI assigned him to cover the war in Vietnam. In Saigon, he shared a house with half a dozen other young journalists and photographers, including Steve Northup, Simon Dring, Tim Page and Joe Galloway. At the end of 1966, he left Vietnam for France and over the next five years freelanced, traveled, and studied in several countries. In 1972, he was UPI correspondent in Dacca reporting on the birth of Bangladesh,

At the end of 1972, Martin Stuart-Fox returned to Australia, where after a brief stint in journalism, he began tutoring in Asian civilizations at the University of Queensland. After gaining an M.A. and Ph.D. in the philosophy and theory of history, he went on to become a professor and Head of History. He retired as professor emeritus in 2005, and is a Fellow of the Australian Academy of the Humanities. His research has focused on the history and politics of Laos, on which he has written six books and more than fifty book chapters and articles, including the Freedom House section on Laos for 2011. He has also written on Buddhist symbolism, the Khmer Rouge period in Cambodia, and Chinese relations with Southeast Asia.

== Partial bibliography ==
- 1982: Contemporary Laos: studies in the politics and society of the Lao People’s Democratic Republic (Editor and contributor)
- 1985: The Murderous Revolution: Life and Death in Pol Pot's Kampuchea (with Ung Bun Heang)
- 1986: Laos: Politics, Economics and Society
- 1986: The twilight language: explorations in Buddhist symbolism and meditation (with Rod Bucknell)
- 1987: Vietnam in Laos: Hanoi's model for Kampuchea
- 1992: Historical dictionary of Laos (4th ed, 2023, with Simon Creak and Martin Rathie)
- 1996: Buddhist kingdom, Marxist state: the making of modern Laos
- 1997: A history of Laos
- 1998: The Lao kingdom of Lan Xang: rise and decline
- 2003: A short history of China and Southeast Asia: tribute, trade and influence
- 2006: Naga cities of the Mekong: a guide to the temples, legends and history of Laos (photographs by Steve Northup)
- 2010 Festivals of Laos (with Somsanouk Mixay; photographs by Steve Northup)
- 2010 The A to Z of Laos

== Journal articles ==
- Stuart-Fox, Martin (1994). "Conflicting conceptions of the state: Siam, France and Vietnam in the late nineteenth century" (free). Journal of the Siam Society. JSS Vol. 82.0 (digital). Siam Heritage Trust. "Historians of Southeast Asia often face problems in using terms drawn from and applicable to European polities and societies to refer to non-European equivalents that do not conform to European models."
- Stuart-Fox, Martin (2011) “Symbolism in city planning in Cambodia from Angkor to Phnom Penh” (with Paul Reeve) Journal of the Siam Society 99, 105-138.
- Stuart-Fox, Martin (2015) “The Origins of Causal Cognition in Early Hominins” Philosophy and Biology 30, 2 (2015): 247-266.
- Stuart-Fox, Martin (2022) “Major transitions in human evolutionary history” World Futures (https://doi.org/10.1080/02604027.2021.2018646)
