= Yidam =

Buddhist tutelary deity

A yidam or iṣṭadevatā is a meditational deity that serves as a focus for meditation and spiritual practice, said to be manifestations of Buddhahood or enlightened mind. Yidams are an integral part of Vajrayana, including Tibetan Buddhism, Chinese Esoteric Buddhism and Shingon, which emphasize the use of esoteric practices and rituals to attain enlightenment more swiftly. The yidam is one of the three roots of the inner refuge formula and is also the key element of deity yoga. Yidam is sometimes translated by the term "tutelary deity".

A yidam is considered to be a manifestation of enlightened qualities and a means to connect with specific aspects of the enlightened mind. The yidam is visualized during meditation in intricate detail, with the aim of internalizing its qualities and attributes. This practice is intended to facilitate the practitioner's transformation and realization of their own innate enlightened nature. It is believed to help purify the mind, accumulate positive karma, and ultimately lead to the realization of emptiness and the nature of reality.

During personal meditation practice (sādhana), the yogi identifies their own form, attributes and mind with those of a yidam for the purpose of transformation. Yidam practices can vary greatly depending on the specific deity chosen, the lineage, and the teachings followed. The visualization, recitation of mantras, and engagement with the symbolic attributes of the yidam are common elements of these practices.

Examples of yidams include the meditation deities Chakrasamvara, Kalachakra, Hevajra, Yamantaka, and Vajrayogini, all of whom have a distinctive iconography, mandala, mantra, rites of invocation and practice. Overall, yidam practices are a distinctive feature of Vajrayana, emphasizing the importance of personal connection with and transformation through specific enlightened aspects.

== Etymology ==
Yidam is said to be a contraction of Tib. yid-kyi-dam-tshig, meaning "samaya of mind" or in other words, the state of being indestructibly bonded with the inherently pure and liberated nature of mind. This is said to be the act that balances energies coursing within the pranic ida and pingala channels in the subtle bodies of both participants. The practitioner focuses on and identifies with the resultant Buddha-form or 'meditation deity', the yidam (Tibetan) associated with IDA channel.

The Sanskrit word iṣṭadevatā or iṣṭadevaḥ a compound of iṣṭa (desired, liked, reverenced) + devatā (a deity or divine being) is a term associated with yidam in many popular books on Buddhist Tantra but has not been attested in any Buddhist tantric text in Sanskrit.

== Conceptual framework ==
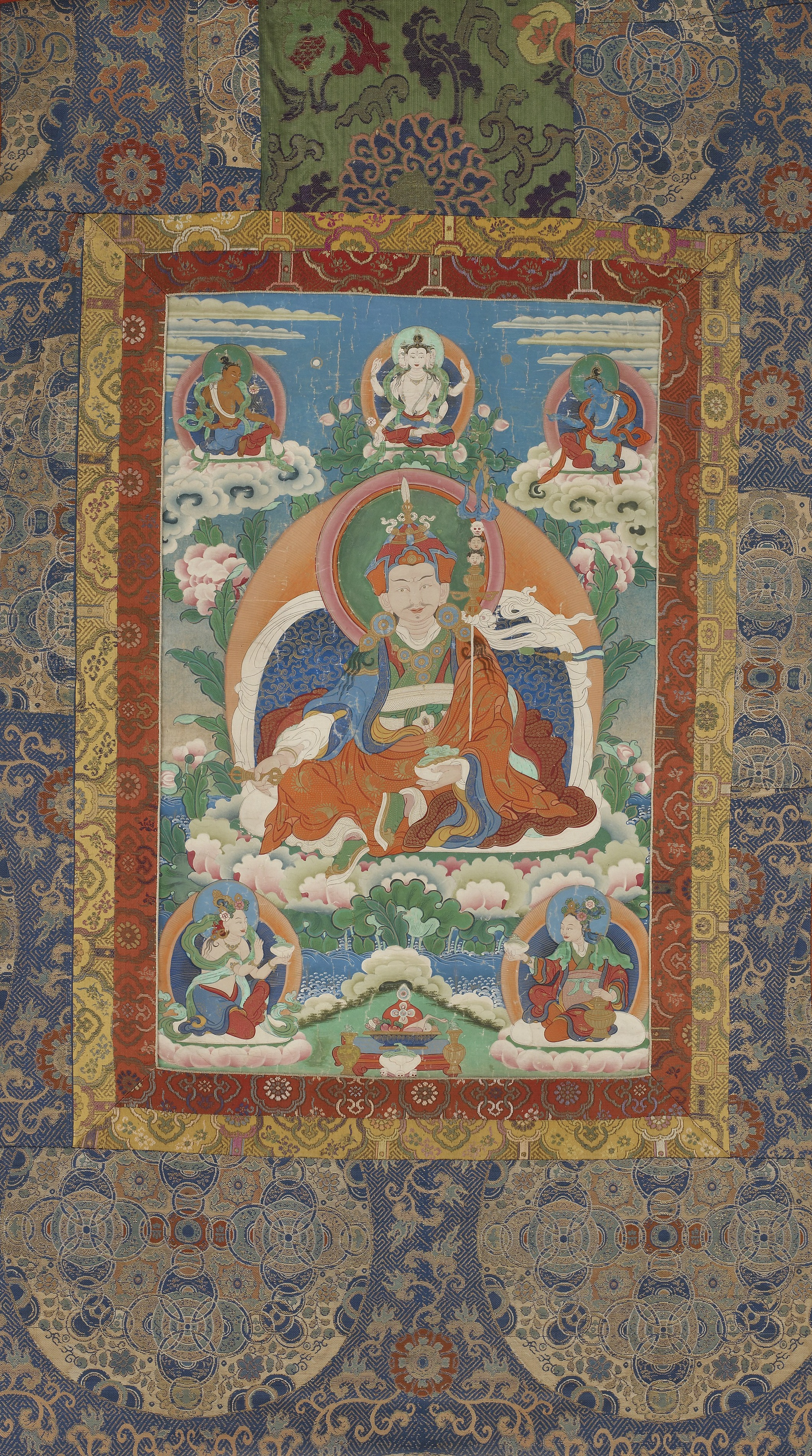
Thangka of Padmasambhava, 19th century, Lhasa, Central Tibet

The yidam's role extends into the framework of the Three Roots within Tibetan Buddhism, a concept that holds deep significance in Vajrayana practice. This concept places the yidam as one of the Three Roots in the 'Inner' refuge formulation, underscoring its essential place in the spiritual journey of practitioners. The Three Roots consist of the guru, yidam, and dakini or dharma protector, each representing a pivotal source of guidance and inspiration for those treading the Vajrayana path. This formulation is traced back to the time of Padmasambhava, as evidenced by scholarly work conducted by Judith Simmer-Brown.

The iconography of the yidam carries a dynamic spectrum, reflecting the practitioner's inner disposition. This iconographic range includes the 'peaceful' form, the 'wrathful' manifestation (referred to as 'tro wa' in Tibetan), and the state of being 'neither peaceful nor wrathful' (designated as 'shi ma tro' in Tibetan). These manifestations allow practitioners to harmonize their spiritual journey with their innate nature, providing a tailored approach to self-realization. Tenzin Palmo further elaborates on this, emphasizing the connection between the practitioner's nature and the yidam's appearance.

Guidance in the selection of a yidam is traditionally provided by the guru, who offers insights into which yidam resonates best with the practitioner's aspirations and tendencies. Subsequently, the guru imparts initiation into the mandala of the chosen yidam, a process that marks the commencement of deity yoga practices. The intertwining of the guru's wisdom and the yidam's enlightened qualities creates a deep connection that strengthens the practitioner's spiritual journey. This connection underscores the notion of indivisibility, highlighting how the guru's teachings and the yidam's essence merge within the practitioner's mindstream.

The yidam's significance extends beyond mere practice; it is also perceived as the root of success in Vajrayana practice. Its transformative power lies in its representation of awakening, serving as a guide for practitioners to navigate their path toward enlightenment. Through its versatile manifestations, personalized guidance, and the seamless bond between guru and yidam, the practice of yidam becomes a cornerstone of accomplishment in Vajrayana.

== Diverse forms ==
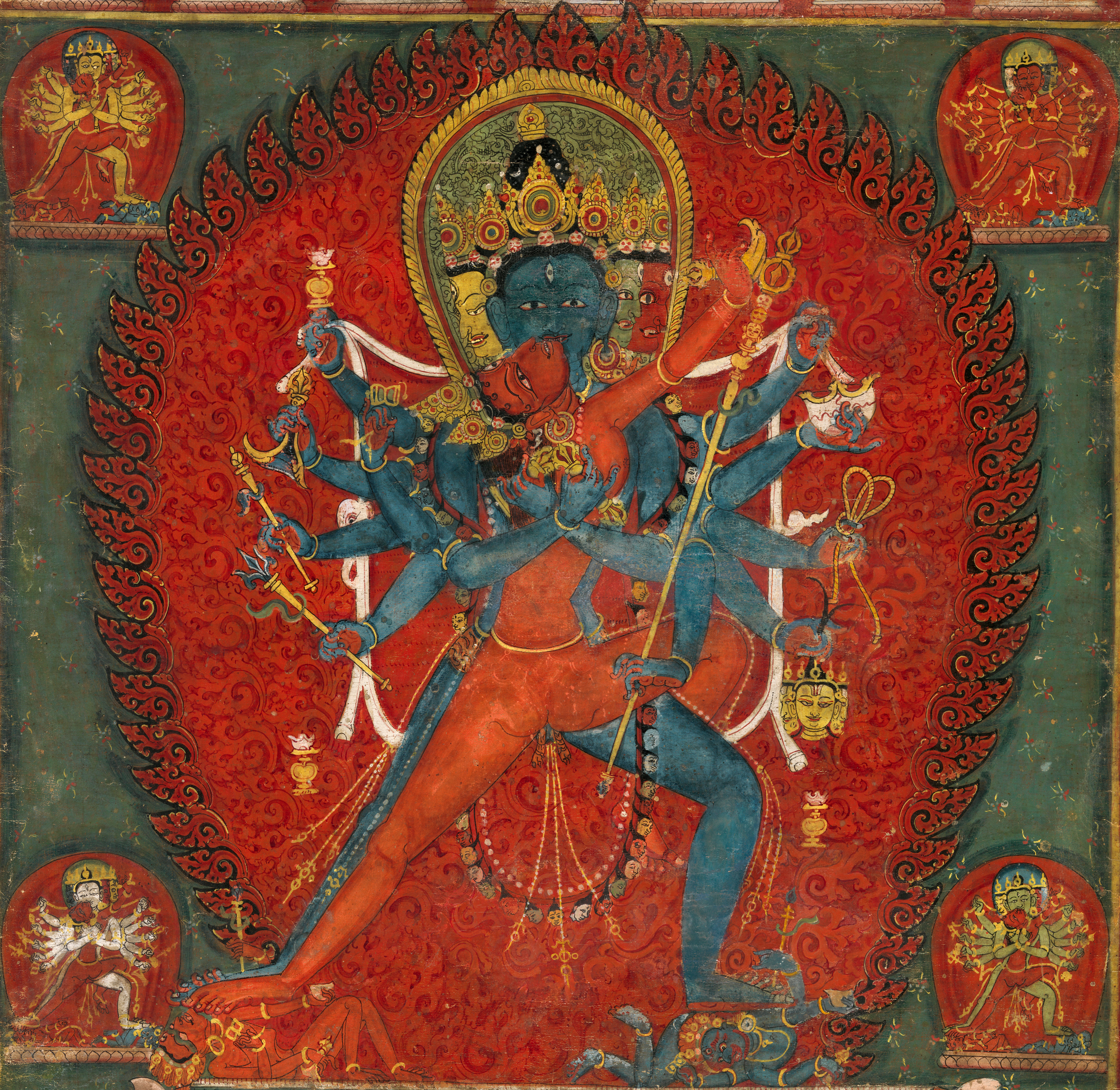
Saṃvara, the central deity of the tantra, with Vajravārāhī in Yab-Yum pose. Nepal, 1575-1600. Metropolitan Museum of Art

The practice of yidam in Vajrayana Buddhism manifests a diverse array of meditation deities, each carrying distinct attributes, symbolism, and significance. This variety underscores the richness and depth of the Vajrayana tradition, accommodating practitioners with different inclinations and spiritual aspirations.

Numerous iconic yidams hold a prominent place in Vajrayana practice, each representing specific enlightened qualities. Chakrasamvara, often depicted in union with his consort Vajravarahi, symbolizes the union of wisdom and compassion. Vajrakilaya embodies the fierce aspect of enlightenment, conquering obstacles and negativities. Green Tara, known for her swift compassion and protection, appeals to those seeking guidance and aid.

Vajrayana's expansive tantric pantheon offers an extensive selection of yidams, catering to a broad spectrum of practitioners. These deities encompass both peaceful and wrathful manifestations, providing practitioners with a spectrum of energies to engage with during meditation. Yamantaka, with his wrathful form, embodies the conquering of death and ignorance. Hevajra, in union with his consort Nairatmya, represents the union of emptiness and bliss.

Practitioners often gravitate toward specific yidams based on personal affinity or spiritual aspirations. This personal connection can guide practitioners towards yidams that resonate with their inner journey. Some practitioners are drawn to the wisdom of Manjushri, while others find resonance in the compassionate embrace of Avalokiteshvara.

=== Regional variations ===
The diversity of yidams extends to regional and cultural variations within Vajrayana Buddhism. East Asian Vajrayana, as practiced in China, Korea, and Japan, incorporates yidams like Marici and the "five mysteries of Vajrasattva". These variations reflect the integration of yidam practices into local contexts while preserving the essence of the tradition.

==== In Nepalese Newar Buddhism ====
The principal yidam in the Newar Vajrayana tradition of Nepal are Chakrasamvara and Vajravarahi. In that tradition, three components are essential to a temple complex: a main shrine symbolizing Svayambhu Mahachaitya; an exoteric shrine featuring Buddha Shakyamuni and other buddhas and bodhisattvas; and an esoteric shrine dedicated to the yidam, to which only initiates may be admitted.

==== In East Asian Buddhism ====
The Vajrayana traditions of China, Korea and Japan, while smaller and less prominent than Indo-Tibetan tantric Buddhism, are characterized in part by the utilization of yidams in meditation, though they use their own terms. One prominent ishta-devata in East Asian Vajrayana is Marici (Ch: Molichitian, Jp: Marishi-ten). In the Shingon tradition of Japan, prominent yidam include the "five mysteries of Vajrasattva," which are Vajrasattva (Jp. Kongosatta "金剛薩埵"), Surata / Ishta-vajrinī (Jp. Yoku-kongonyo "慾金剛女"), Kelikilā-vajrinī (Jp. Shoku-kongonyo "触金剛女"), Kāmā / Rāga-vajrinī (Jp. Ai-kongonyo "愛金剛女"), and Kāmesvarā / Mana-vajrinī (Jp. Man-kongonyo "慢金剛女").

== Cultivation and practice ==
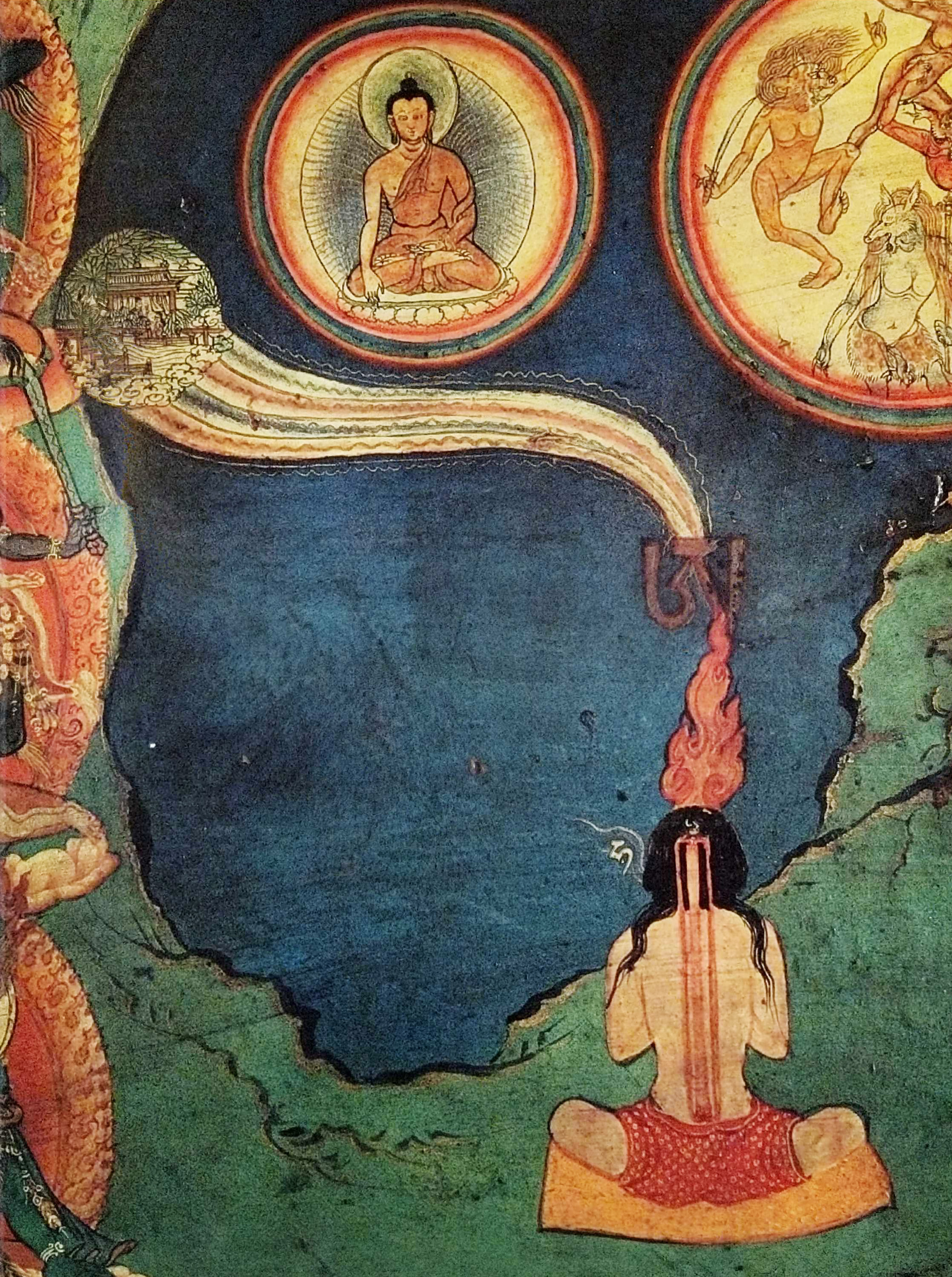
A section of the Northern wall mural at the Lukhang Temple depicting both Tummo (inner fire) and Phowa (transference of consciousness)

During the (meditation) practice of the generation stage, a practitioner (sadhaka) establishes a strong familiarity with the Ishta-deva (an enlightened being) by means of visualization and a high level of concentration. During the practice of the completion stage, a practitioner focuses on methods to actualize the transformation of one's own mindstream and body into the meditation deity by meditation and yogic techniques of energy-control such as tummo ('inner heat yoga'). Through these complementary disciplines of generation and completion one increasingly perceives the pervasive Buddha nature.

Judith Simmer-Brown summarises:

... a yidam, a personal meditational deity, a potent ritual symbol simultaneously representing the mind of the guru and lineage of enlightened teachers, and the enlightened mind of the tantric practitioner. Recognizing the inseparability of these two is the ground of tantric practice.

Berzin (1997: unpaginated) in discussing Buddhist refuge commitment and bodhisattva vows frames a caution to sadhana:

More specifically, this commitment means not taking ultimate refuge in gods or spirits. Buddhism, particularly in its Tibetan form, often contains ritual ceremonies, or pujas, directed toward various Buddha-figures or fierce protectors in order to help dispel obstacles and accomplish constructive purposes. Performing these ceremonies provides conducive circumstances for negative potentials to ripen in trivial rather than major obstacles, and positive potentials to ripen sooner rather than later. If we have built up overwhelmingly negative potentials, however, these ceremonies are ineffective in averting difficulties. Therefore, propitiating gods, spirits, protectors or even Buddhas is never a substitute for attending to our karma – avoiding destructive conduct and acting in a constructive manner. Buddhism is not a spiritual path of protector-worship, or even Buddha-worship. The safe direction of the Buddhist path is working to become a Buddha ourselves.

In the Vajrayana practices of Tibetan Buddhism, 'safe direction', or 'refuge' is undertaken through the Three Roots, the practitioner relying on an Ishta-deva in deity yoga as a means of becoming a Buddha.

== Western academic studies ==
Recent Western scholarship has made significant strides in unraveling the complexities of yidam practices within Buddhism. Scholars such as Geoffrey Samuel have examined the cross-cultural implications of Vajrayana practices, including yidam engagement in Western contexts. Francesca Fremantle's work has illuminated the symbolic and philosophical dimensions of yidams, offering insights into their iconography and their alignment with tantric philosophy. This scholarship extends to visual culture as well, as seen in Rob Linrothe's studies on the visual representation of yidams, while David Germano's research delves into the philosophical foundations that underpin these practices within broader Buddhist contexts. Janet Gyatso and Kurtis Schaeffer have explored the roles of yidams in tantric rituals and their connection to gender dynamics. Jacob P. Dalton's investigations have contributed to our understanding of how yidam practices have evolved over time and across different Buddhist lineages. Together, these scholars illuminate the multifaceted aspects of yidam practices, enriching our comprehension of their historical, cultural, and philosophical significance within Buddhism.

== See also ==
- Five Dhyani Buddhas
- Wisdom Kings
