= Twilight language =

Secret language of tantric traditions

Twilight language or secret language is a rendering of the Sanskrit term sāṃdhyābhāṣā (written also sāndhyābhāṣā, sāṃdhyabhāṣā, sāndhyabhāṣā; Wylie: dgongs-pa'i skad, THL gongpé ké) or of their modern Indic equivalents (especially in Magahi, Bengali, Odia, Assamese, Maithili, Hindi, Nepali, Braj Bhasha and Khariboli).

As popularized by Roderick Bucknell and Martin Stuart-Fox in The Twilight Language: Explorations in Buddhist Meditation and Symbolism in 1986, the notion of "twilight language" is a supposed polysemic language and communication system associated with tantric traditions in Vajrayana Buddhism and Hinduism. It includes visual communication, verbal communication and nonverbal communication. Tantric texts are often written in a form of the twilight language that is incomprehensible to the uninitiated reader. As part of an esoteric tradition of initiation, the texts are not to be employed by those without an experienced guide and the use of the twilight language ensures that the uninitiated do not easily gain access to the knowledge contained in these works.

The phrase "twilight language" has subsequently been adopted by some other Western writers, including Judith Simmer-Brown.

== Meaning ==
According to Mircea Eliade (1970), in 1916 Hara Prasad Shastri proposed the translation of "twilight language". However, in 1928 Vidhushekar Shāstri disagreed with that translation, showing that the term is based on a shortened form of the word sandhāya, which can be translated as "having in view", "intending", or "with regard to". Eliade concludes that: "Hence there is no reference to the idea of a 'twilight language'." He continues by speculating on how the term came to be corrupted by scribes who read the familiar word sandhyā ("crepuscular") for the original sandhā. Eliade therefore translates the phrase as "intentional language". Staal explains, "sandhā means esoteric meaning, as contrasted with prima facie or superficial meaning," and suggests to translate sandhābhāsā as "secret language".

However, the phrase "twilight language" continues to be used by many Western writers. For example, according to Judith Simmer-Brown:

As has often been said, tantric texts are written in "twilight language" (sandha-bhasa, gongpay-kay), which, as the Hevajra tantra states, is a "secret language, that great convention of the yoginis, which the shravakas and others cannot unriddle". This means that the texts of Buddhist tantra cannot be understood without the specific oral commentary by authorized Vajrayana teachers.

== Usage ==
=== In the Vajrayana tradition ===
As Bucknell and Stuart-Fox state:

In the Vajrayana tradition, now preserved mainly in Tibetan sects, it has long been recognized that certain important teachings are expressed in a form of secret symbolic language known as saṃdhyā-bhāṣā, "Twilight Language". Mudrās and mantras, maṇḍalas and cakras, those mysterious devices and diagrams that were so much in vogue in the Buddhist culture of the 1960s, were all examples of Twilight Language [...]

Numbers, numerology and the spirituality of numerals is key to the twilight language and endemic to Vajrayana, as it is throughout Indian religions. Numbers that are particularly frequent in classification are three, five and nine. As Bucknell and Stuart-Fox state:

The fivefold classification presented in the tantras is remarkably comprehensive, embracing objects of every conceivable type; it includes the infamous set of "five Ms" (fish, meat, wine, mudrā, sexual intercourse) and even a set of five "body fluids" (faeces, urine, blood, semen, flesh). In addition it includes sets of doctrinal principles, such as the five skandhas (factors of existence), the four kāyas (Buddha-bodies) and the triad prajña, upāya, bodhicitta (wisdom, means, enlightenment-mind). For example, prajña, upāya, and bodhicitta are identified with the triads female/male/union, Amitābha/Akṣobhya/Vairocana, and so on, and are thus implicitly assigned to the water, fire, and space groups respectively.

— The Twilight Language

=== In the Pali Canon ===
Although twilight language is primarily a feature of esoteric traditions such as the Vajrayana, Bucknell and Stuart-Fox cite the Thai Bhikkhu Buddhadasa as having explored "the importance of symbolic language in the Pali Canon ... in a number of lectures and publications."

=== In Sonepur literature ===
Sonepur, Odisha and its literature is championed by such as Charyapada, Matsyendranath, Daripada and other Naths:

The growth of literature at Sonepur can be traced to Charyapada, to Matsyendranath and Daripada of the Natha cult. They wrote esoteric poetry in a language known as Sandhya bhasa. The local idioms they used are still in currency in this area.

== See also ==
- Conceptual metaphor
- Image schema
- Language of the birds
- Visual language
- Visual thinking
