= Deity yoga =

Vajrayana practice involving visualization of a deity

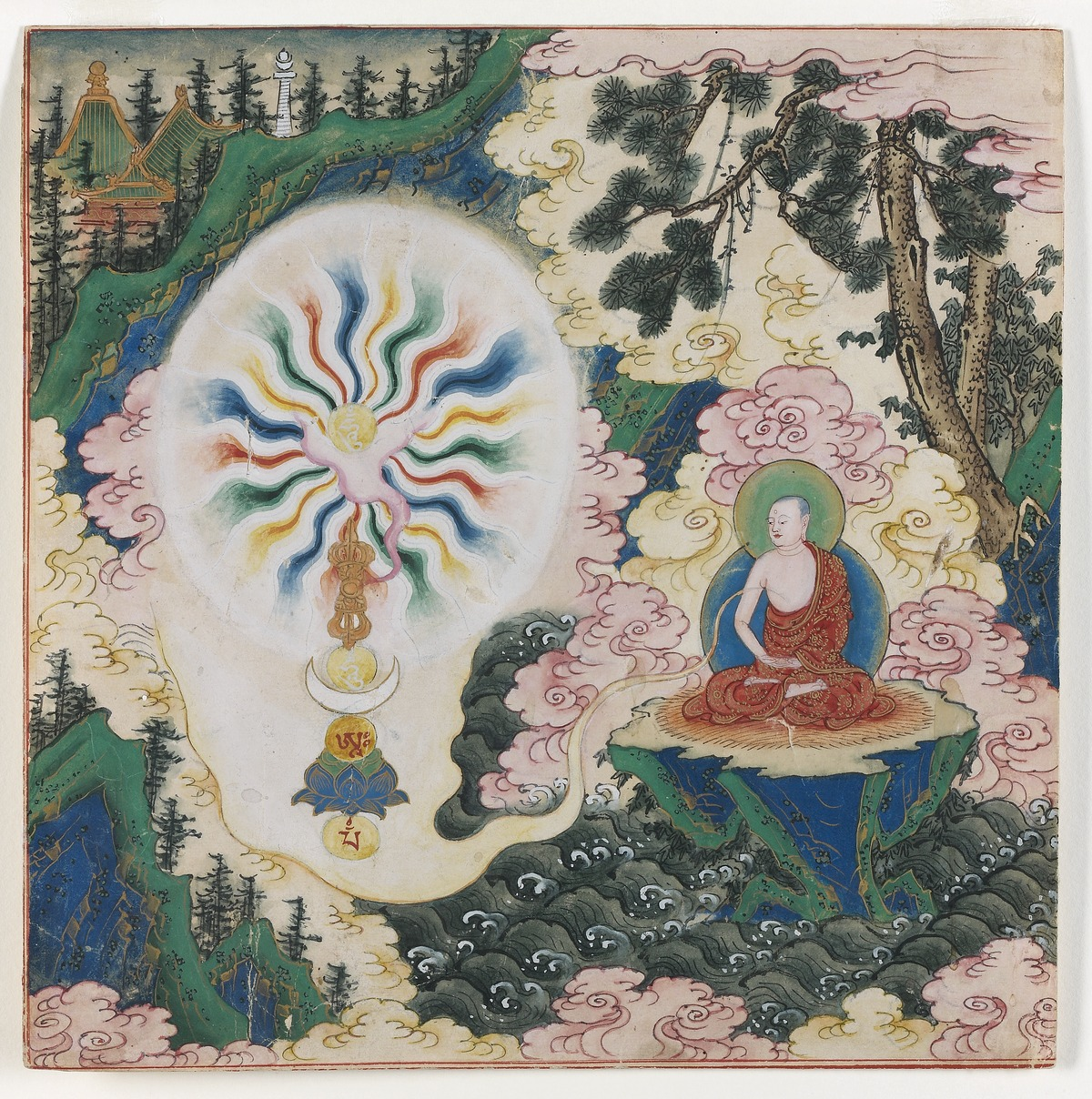
An 18th-century Mongolian miniature which depicts a monk generating a tantric visualization

The fundamental practice of Vajrayana and Tibetan tantra is deity yoga (devatayoga), a form of Buddhist meditation centered on a chosen deity or "cherished divinity" (Skt. Iṣṭa-devatā, Tib. yidam). This involves the recitation of mantras and prayers alongside the detailed visualization of the deity and their mandala—a sacred configuration that includes their Buddha field, consorts, and attendant figures. The 14th-century scholar Tsongkhapa stated that deity yoga is the distinctive feature that sets Tantra apart from the Sutra-based path.

In the highest class of Tantras, the Unsurpassed Yoga Tantras, deity yoga is typically practiced in two stages: the generation stage (utpatti-krama) and the completion stage (nispanna-krama). In the generation stage, practitioners dissolve ordinary perception into emptiness and then re-imagine reality through the form of a fully enlightened deity, understood as an expression of ultimate truth. The deity is visualized as “empty yet apparent,” like a mirage or rainbow, never solid or objectively real.

This visualization is cultivated along with "divine pride"—the realization or conviction that one is the deity being visualized. Through this process, the practitioner enacts a form of divine embodiment, aligning body, speech, and mind with enlightened qualities. Unlike ordinary pride, divine pride is grounded in compassion and the understanding of emptiness. The deity form, along with the illusory body, is ultimately dissolved back into luminous emptiness, followed by reappearance as the deity. This cycle is repeated across multiple sessions until stabilization occurs.

Upon mastering the generation stage, the practitioner proceeds to the completion stage. These practices were first systematized by Indian commentators such as Buddhaguhya (c. 700 CE), who described techniques aimed at directly realizing the nature of mind. Completion stage yogas include both formless meditations on the mind's innate emptiness and practices involving the subtle body, such as the Six Dharmas of Naropa and the Six Yogas of Kalachakra. These systems engage "energy channels" (Skt. nadi, Tib. rtsa), "winds" (vayu, Tib. rlung), and "drops" (bindu, Tib. thig le) to generate bliss and clarity. Other associated methods include dream yoga, bardo practices, phowa (transference of consciousness), and chöd, a ritual of radical self-offering.

== Imagery and ritual ==
A Japanese depiction of the Amida Triad in Seed Syllable form (Siddham Script). Visualizing deities in the form of seed syllables is a common Vajrayana meditation. In Shingon, one of the most common practices is Ajikan (阿字觀), meditating on the syllable A.

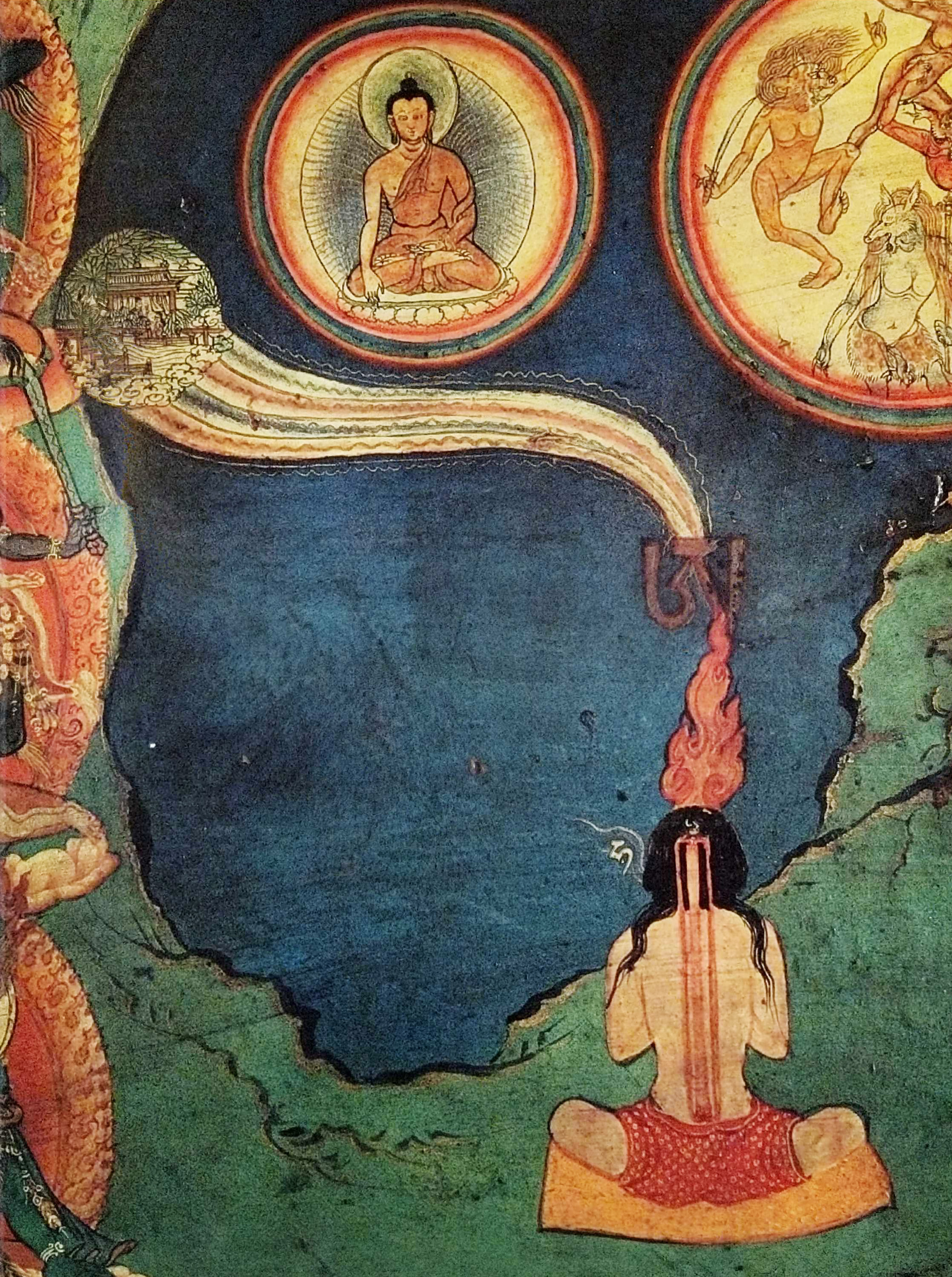
A Tibetan depiction of the perfection stage practices of tummo (Skt. candali, inner heat) and phowa (transference of consciousness)

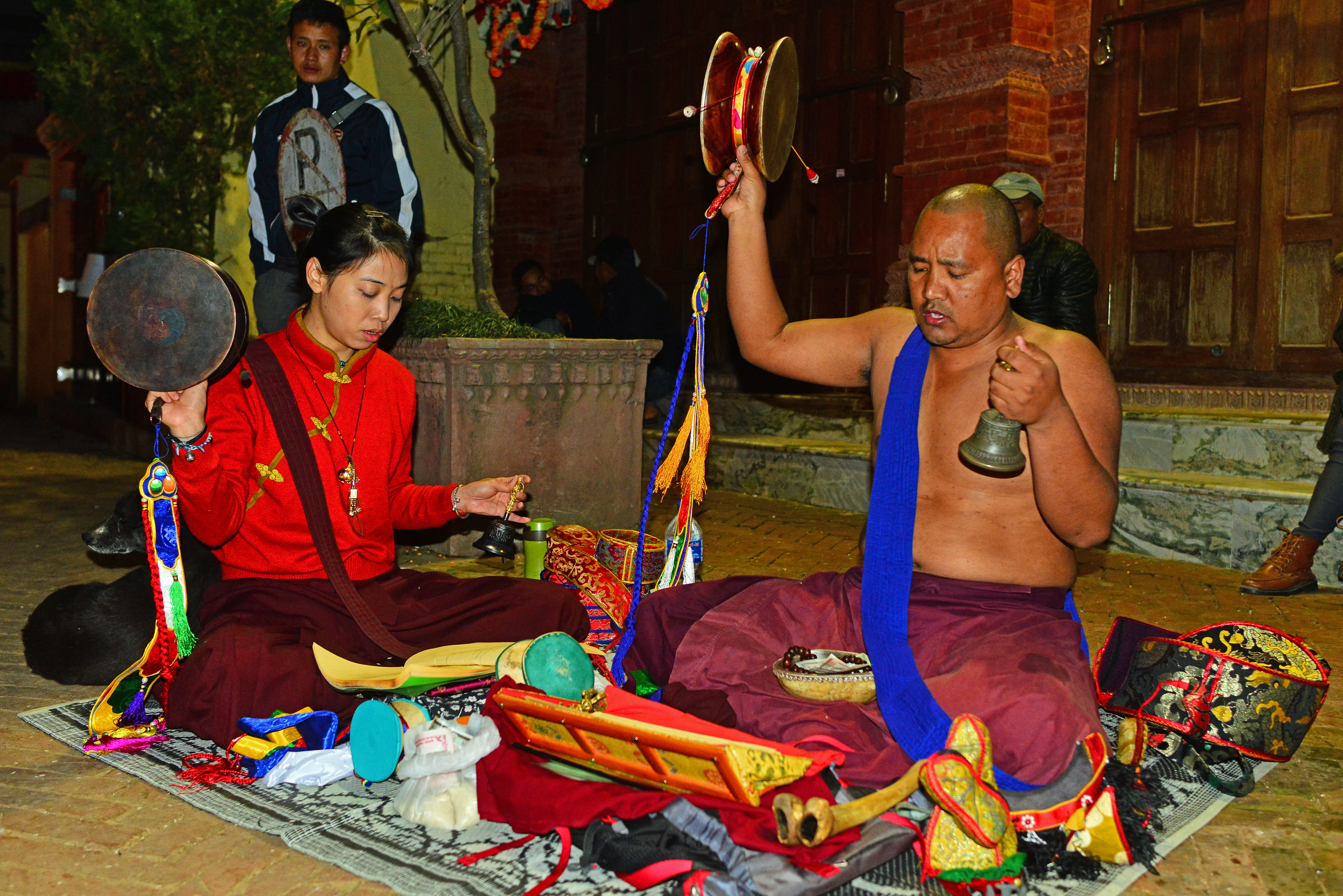
Chöd ritual, note the use of damaru and hand-bell, as well as the kangling (thighbone trumpet)

Representations of the deity, such as statues (murti), paintings (thangka), or mandala, are often employed as an aid to visualization, in deity yoga. The use of visual aids, particularly microcosmic/macrocosmic diagrams, known as "mandalas", is another unique feature of Buddhist Tantra. Mandalas are symbolic depictions of the sacred space of the awakened Buddhas and Bodhisattvas as well as of the inner workings of the human person. The macrocosmic symbolism of the mandala then, also represents the forces of the human body. The explanatory tantra of the Guhyasamaja tantra, the Vajramala, states: "The body becomes a palace, the hallowed basis of all the Buddhas."

All ritual in Vajrayana practice can be seen as aiding in this process of visualization and identification. The practitioner can use various hand implements such as a vajra, bell, hand-drum (damaru) or a ritual dagger (phurba), but also ritual hand gestures (mudras) can be made, special chanting techniques can be used, and in elaborate offering rituals or initiations, many more ritual implements and tools are used, each with an elaborate symbolic meaning to create a special environment for practice. Vajrayana has thus become a major inspiration in traditional Tibetan art.

== In the lower tantras ==
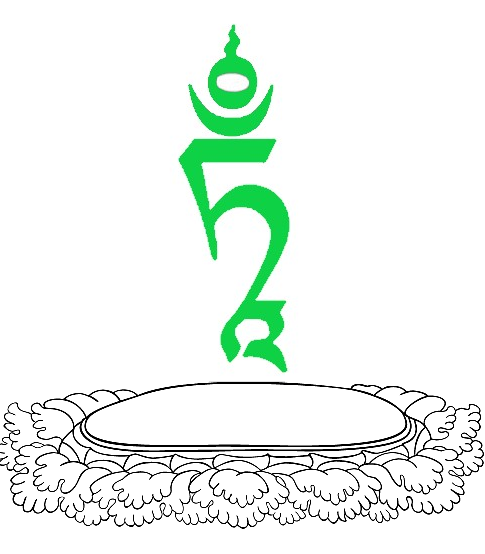
TAM the seed syllable (bija) of the deity Green Tara. In some practices, one first visualizes the seed syllable, and the deity arises out of this.

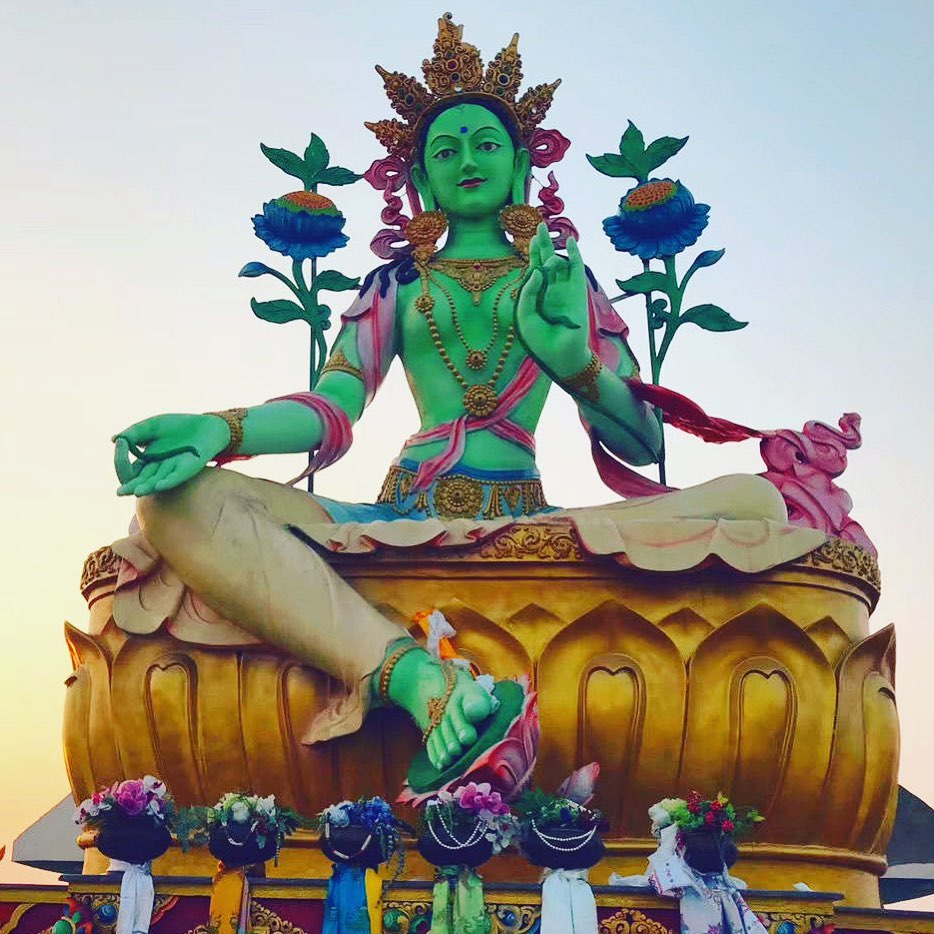
A statue of Green Tara, a common meditation deity in Tibetan Buddhism.

Deity yoga is the central practice of Buddhist Tantra. In the three lower or "outer" tantras (Action, Performance and Yoga), Deity yoga practice is often divided into "the yoga with signs," and "the yoga without signs."

Deity yoga engages creative visualization as a skillful means of personal transformation through which the practitioner (sadhaka) visualizes a chosen deity (yidam) as part of a mandala or refuge tree in order transform their experience of the appearance aspect of reality. As the 14th Dalai Lama says, "In brief, the body of a Buddha is attained through meditating on it."

=== Yoga with signs ===
Here, "signs" or "supports" refers to ritual acts, visualized images, mantras, and mudras. There are two main forms of deity yoga visualization: front and self generation.

"Front-generation" is when the deity is visualized in the space in front of oneself. First, the deity's residence may be visualized and then the deity is invited to come, which is imagined as appearing in front of the meditator. Sometimes the deity is imagined as just a moon disk, or the seed syllable of the deity, at other times, the full form of the deity may be visualized. Then the yogi takes refuge, generates bodhicitta, offers prayers, praises, and offerings like water and food (real or imagined), confesses their misdeeds, takes vows and so forth. Then one may meditate by reciting mantras (while focusing on visualized letters at the deity's heart). Mudras (hand seals) may also be included. One may also cultivate the four immeasurables. One also meditates on the emptiness of the deity's form. This approach is considered less advanced and thus it is safer. Front generation as a main practice is more common in the lower tantras.

"Self-generation" is the practice in which one imagines oneself as the deity. This is held to be more advanced and accompanied by a degree of spiritual risk. To practice this, one must first meditate on emptiness and establish the view realizing emptiness (or at least a similitude of emptiness). Then one imagines the deity arising (often out of bright seed syllables resting on a moon disc or a lotus) and repeats the deity's mantra (which can be done orally or mentally). During deity yoga, one may also perform various mudras (hand seals) depending on the type of sadhana (practice) one is doing. Whatever the case, the initial goal in generation stage practice is the clear appearance of the visualization in a non-artificial, natural way.

In more advanced practices, the deity often appears together with their mandala (which includes numerous other deities in it) and the practitioner visualizes themselves (and their actions and thoughts) as the deity and their environment as the mandala. In some sadhanas, one also visualizes one's body as the mandala, filled with deities.

Front and self generation are often actually combined with each other in a single practice. For example, one may first perform front visualization, and then self visualization. Then one may have the front visualized deity merge with oneself as deity.

To improve one's visualization, one may systematically focus on each part of the deity (face, hand, etc.) and correct their appearance. Another method is that of stabilizing the mind by holding the breath and making an effort to focus on the image. Then one relaxes on the exhale. One may take breaks from the visualization by just reciting mantra.

Regarding the recitation of mantra during the visualization process, there are many ways it can be done, such as:

- Repeating a mantra while observing the form of the mantra's letters at the heart of the deity visualized in front. This may be done orally or mentally. There is also a technique in which holds one's breath during the mental repetition to aid in focusing the mind. One may use a mala.
- Repeating the mantra while observing the form of the letters at your own heart (while practicing self-generation). One holds the breath while practicing mental recitation, then in the exhale one just views one's deity body.
- "Dwelling in Fire," one imagines "a very still fire, like the flame of a butter lamp," with a moon disk inside with the mantra syllables. One holds the vital winds and cultivates this "until the experience of vivid appearance occurs."
- Focusing on observing the sounds of the mantra (while whispering or mentally reciting the mantra), without totally abandoning observing your own divine body with moon and mantra letters at the heart. According to Kongtrül, once the meditation becomes vivid, one no longer focuses on the shape of the letters, but only on "the sonority of the spontaneously arising sounds of the mantra, resonating like the chimes of a bell." One holds the vital winds and cultivates this until one experiences a vivid appearance. This can serve as a basis for calm abiding (samatha).
- Contemplation on mantra leading to non-conceptual insight called "the limit of sound." Kongtrül states "analysis and precise examination of the mantra's sound alone leads to the understanding that its essence is without origin, cessation, or abiding."

In Yoga Tantra and Unsurpassed Yoga Tantra, there is also the practice of cultivating calm abiding by focusing on a subtle object, such as a tiny vajra the size of a sesame seed placed at some point in the body, such as the tip of the nose.

The ultimate purpose of deity yoga is to bring the yogi to the realization that they and the deity are in essence the same (i.e. empty), i.e. that they are non-dual (advaya). This is done through repeated practice which leads to familiarization with the form, deeds and thoughts of a Buddha. Tsongkhapa states:

Just as the suchness of oneself is ultimately free from all [conceptual and dualistic] proliferations, so is the suchness of the deity. Therefore, create the pride of the sameness of oneself and the deity in terms of nonconceptual perception of the undifferentiability of those two, like a mixture of water and milk. Concentrate without appearance [of the two as different] until your knowledge is very definite. This is the ultimate deity.

According to Tsongkhapa, throughout the various stages of visualization one is to maintain the cognition of emptiness and "one trains in causing everything to appear as like illusions." During the meditation, the deity is to be imagined as not solid or tangible, as "empty yet apparent," with the character of a mirage or a rainbow. This method undermines habitual grasping to a solid and fixed reality (i.e. to inherent existence, svabhava), enabling the practitioner to purify spiritual obscurations (klesha).

In the generation stage, the practitioner may visualize the "Four Purities," which is unique to tantric yoga:

1. Seeing one's body as the body of the deity which is a manifestation of the Dharmakaya
2. Seeing one's environment as the pure land or mandala of the deity
3. Perceiving one's enjoyments as the enjoyments of a Buddha, free from any attachment
4. Seeing one's actions as the supreme activities of a Buddha's ripening sentient beings

=== Clear appearance and divine pride ===
According to the 14th Dalai Lama, there are two main factors in deity yoga practice:

Pride in oneself as a deity and vivid appearance of that deity. Divine pride protects one from the pride of being ordinary, and divine vivid appearance protects one from ordinary appearances. Whatever appears to the senses is viewed as the sport of a deity; for instance, whatever forms are seen are viewed as the emanations of a deity and whatever sounds are heard are viewed as the mantras of a deity. One is thereby protected from ordinary appearances, and through this transformation of attitude, the pride of being a deity emerges.

According to Daniel Cozort, divine pride is "the thought that one is oneself the deity being visualized." According to John Powers, the difference between divine pride and defiled pride is that divine pride is based on an understanding of the emptiness of all things and also on compassion. Since "all appearances are viewed as manifestations of the luminous and empty nature of mind, and so the divine pride of deity yoga does not lead to attachment, greed, and other afflictions."

According to Gyatrul Rinpoche, the point of this practice is to "understand your buddha nature, which is the very essence of your being" and is "intrinsically present" in all beings. The fact that the deity is a reflection of qualities already inherent in the practitioner is what makes this practice different from mere deluded or wishful thinking.

=== Yoga without signs ===
Once one has the ability to rest in the vivid appearance of the deity, one may practice the yoga without signs. This is the final meditative concentration of deity yoga in the lower tantras (Action, Performance and Yoga tantra). Though the main focus is on emptiness, one still maintains the deity visualization (except in the direct cognition of emptiness). This yoga is a union of calm abiding and special insight focused on the empty nature of the images and sounds. It is a meditative stabilization which realizes the emptiness of body and mind. Its object is the emptiness of persons and phenomena as it applies to the deity's body and the pure Buddha bodies, vajras, mantra letters, and lotuses of the mandala.

According to the 14th Dalai Lama, "although the sounds and so forth may appear, the mind is ascertaining or realizing only emptiness. This is the union of the two truths in Mantra—one consciousness appearing in the form of divine body or speech and simultaneously realizing emptiness."

According to the Indian master Buddhaguhya, there are three techniques which may be used to settle the mind on emptiness in the yoga without signs:

- The reasoning of its not being either an inherently existent one or many, or the reasoning of its not being produced from self, other, both, or neither. This is a sutra style analytical meditation.
- A stabilizing meditation on the meaning of emptiness. According to the 14th Dalai Lama, repeated analysis is needed to enhance this understanding, and thus the procedure here is one of alternating stabilizing and analytical meditation.
- Eliminating all conventional appearances [such as a divine body] and concentrating solely on the ultimate, the emptiness of inherent existence. According to the 14th Dalai Lama, this refers to "viewing appearances themselves—wherever the mind alights—as empty of inherent existence." This is said to be similar to Great Seal (Mahāmudrā) practice.

== In the higher tantras ==
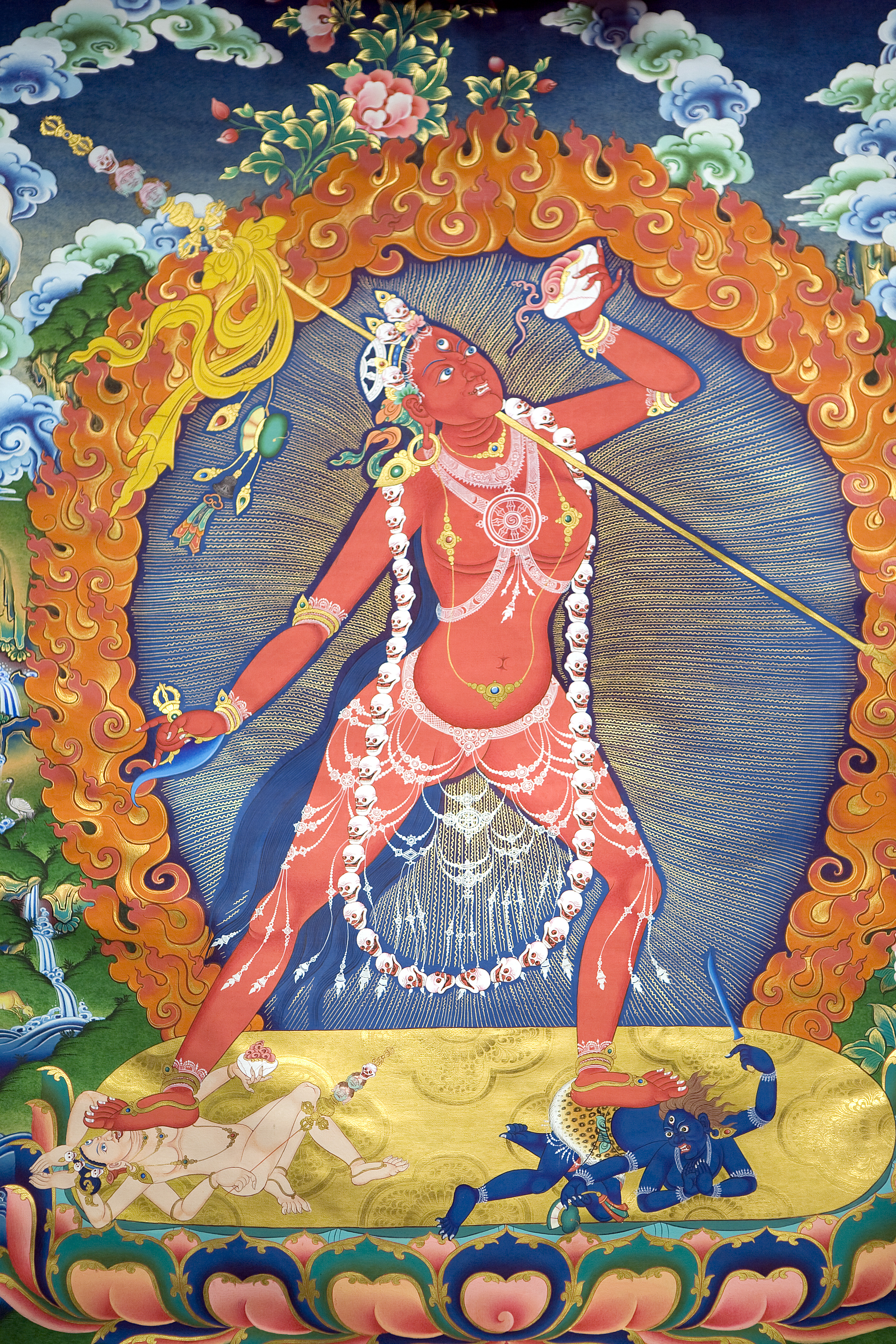
Painting of Vajrayoginī (Dorjé Neljorma), a female Buddha and a ḍākiṇī used as a meditation deity in Highest Yoga Tantra.

=== Generation stage ===
The generation stage or creation phase (Tib. bskyed rim; Skt. utpatti-krama), also known as "the phase of imagination" and "the yoga of fabrications", is the first phase of tantric deity yoga in the Unsurpassed Yoga Tantra of the later schools of Tibetan Buddhism. It also equates to the Mahayoga of the Nyingma school. Kongtrül states that this phase is associated with the body and the birth process (while the Completion phase is associated with the mind and with dissolution at death).

The Nyingma scholar Ju Mipham defines the generation stage as follows: "accessing the purity and equality of appearance and existence through conceptual creations and training in accord with the view that ascertains the meaning of the natural continuum of the ground."

Kongtrül explains the main goal of generation stage practice as purification:

Just as one prepares a field with false millet before sowing rice; One purifies thoughts before embarking on what is without thought. Once the natural state is realized, deliberate fabrication is dispensed with. The two are cultivated as a union, not solely the appearance or emptiness aspect.

There are three bases of purification: birth, death, and the intermediate state. Generation Stage is a visualisation practice utilising "all the senses and the totality of the meditator's body, speech, and mind...[to develop]... confidence in the reality of the deity's world." The meditator's identification with the deity allows them to develop clear appearance, divine pride and the conviction that what appears is illusory and empty. This is done in order to abandon fixation on ordinary thoughts and appearances as well as the false apprehension of things as being inherently real. In this sense, it is similar to deity yoga as practiced in the lower tantras.

One of the main differences between deity yoga in Unsurpassed Yoga Tantra and in the lower tantras is the fierce and sexual appearances of the deities used in Unsurpassed Yoga Tantra. It is also common for these deities to be depicted in sexual union. Thus, Longchenpa categorically states: "No matter how many deities are involved, if they are not in union, it is outer tantra. If they are in union, it is inner tantra." Powerful imagery which uses death, violence and charnel ground motifs is also common. Thus, Longchenpa distinguishes between the pure environments and ritual tools that are visualized in outer tantra (such as celestial palaces and precious jewels), and impure inner tantra environments and tools (such as charnel grounds, skull cups, and ritual knives). Unsurpassed Yoga Tantra also makes use of a subtle body psycho-physiology that is not found in the lower tantras.

The practice of deity yoga relies on the development of meditative absorption (dhyana). Mipham states that "the meaning ascertained by the view of great purity and equality can only be applied correctly to one's own being once the strength of meditative absorption has been perfected. For this reason, meditative absorption is extremely important. It is the primary cause for accomplishing activity and spiritual attainments, both of which require awareness and stability." According to Mipham, the progression of the practice of calm abiding (samatha) based on deity yoga can be measured in the same way it is measured in sutra teachings (that is, through the nine ways of resting the mind and so on).

==== Systems ====
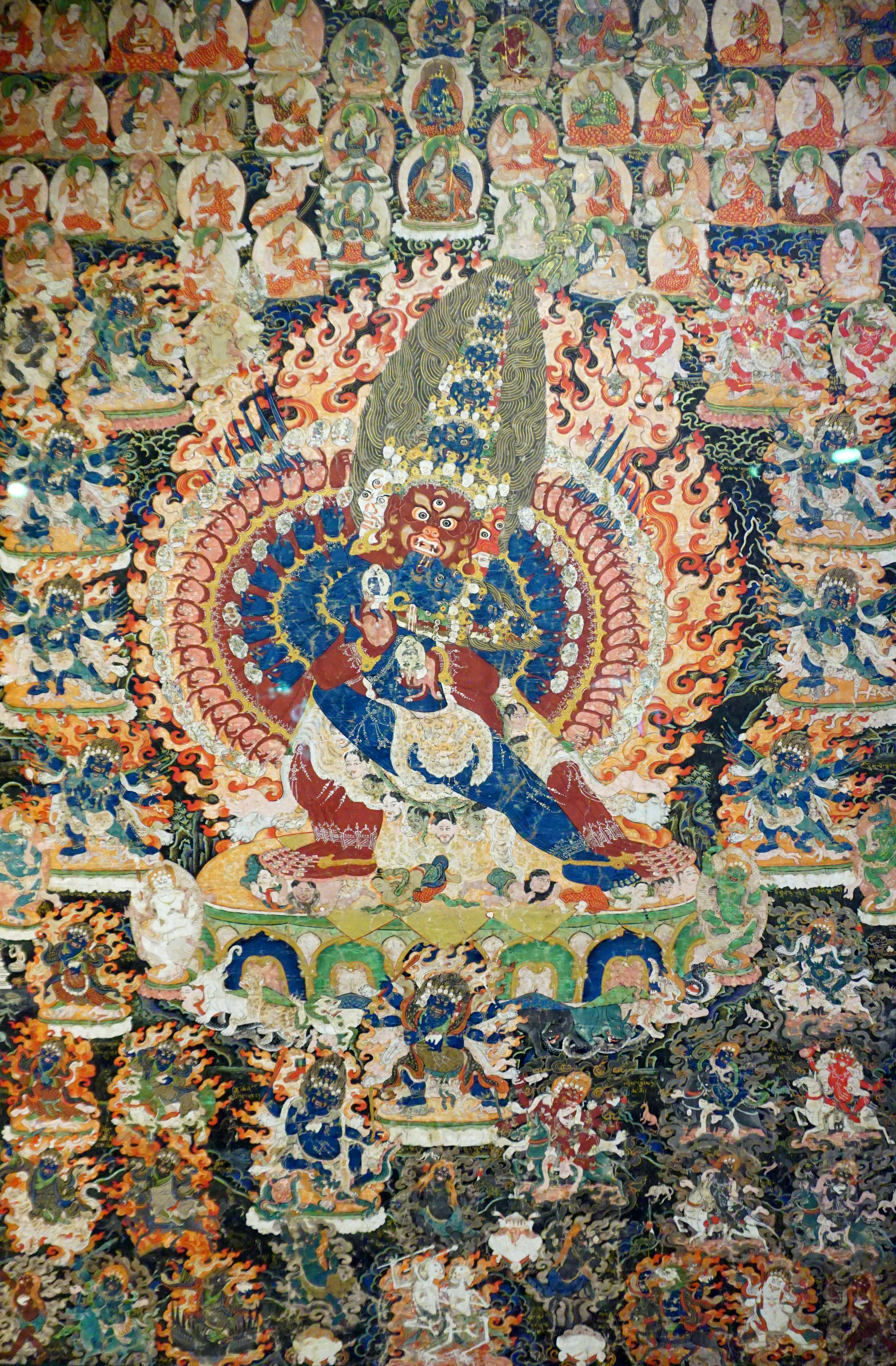
Chemchok Heruka, one of the eight Herukas which are key yidams in Nyingma.

There are various systems of practice based on different tantras. Kongtrül outlines various three branch yoga frameworks (from the Vajramālā Tantra, Mahamaya, etc), various four branch frameworks (which can be found in tantras like the Net of Magical Manifestation and the Guhyasamaja), a six branch framework, an eight branch framework and a twelve branch framework (Kalacakra).

An example of one of these contemplative sequences is that of the Vajramālā Tantra (Vajra Garland), which is as follows:

- Initial Union - Kongtrül states that this "consists of the contemplation of oneself as the main deities, male and female, who act as emanators of the other deities of the mandala." This "includes all steps of the visualization from the creation of the mandala residence up to the creation of the main male and female figures."
- The supremely victorious action - According to Kongtrül, this "consists of the visualization of the entirety of the deities of the mandala who have emanated from the bodhichitta [vital essences] of those two male and female main figures and the arrangement of the deities in their respective places."
- The supremely victorious mandala - This contemplation consists of imagining the Buddha deeds performed by the deities, such as the purification of realms.

==== Practice ====
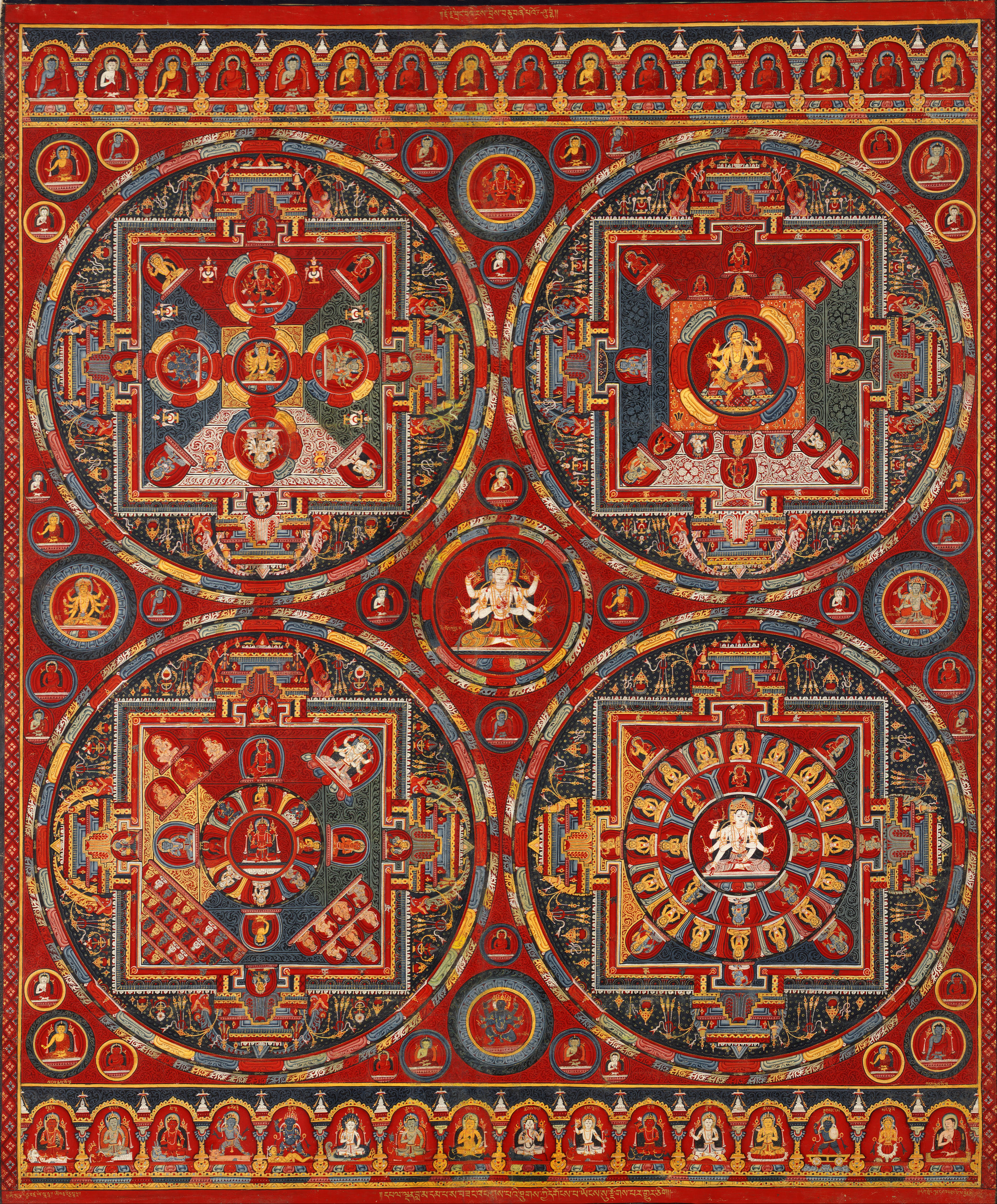
Four Mandalas of the Vajravali Cycle, c. 1429–56, Central Tibet, Tsang (Ngor Monastery), Sakya order.

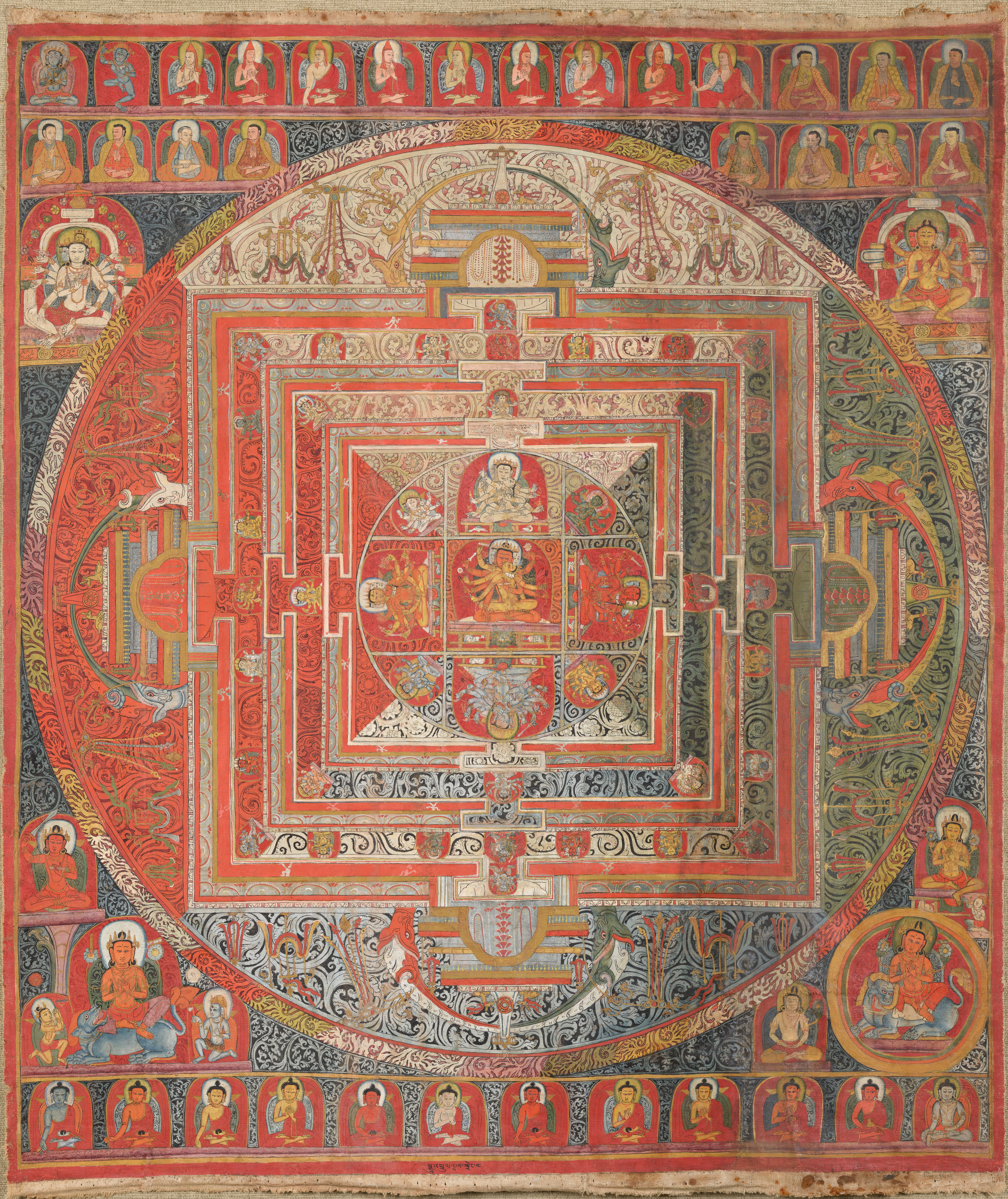
Mañjuvajra mandala with 43 deities.

Regarding the actual practice of yoga, there are some preliminary practices which are sometimes performed before sitting to meditate, such as giving sacrificial food offerings to appease non-human obstructive beings, visualizing a circle of protection to ward off adverse conditions, and meditating on bodhicitta (through practices such as the Seven Branch Prayer) as well as meditating on pristine awareness/emptiness which is commonly done using the mantra om svabhava shuddhah sarva dharmah svabhava shuddho ham.

As to the main practice of generating the image of the deity, Mipham writes that "one begins by resting one's attention on a focal support, such as a buddha statue placed before oneself." Eventually the mind will be able to create the image of the deity without a support. There are numerous ways used to mentally visualize a deity, their residence, seat, and retinue of accompanying deities. These include the sudden appearance of the image, generating the mandala residence first and then having the deity populate it, having the deity arise from a seed syllable or from the recitation of their mantra, and more elaborate generations with various symbols such as a moon, vajra, or sword.

Some of these methods can be elaborate, for example, Kongtrül describes one method called "creation by means of the five actual awakenings" as follows:

First, one imagines that above a seat formed of a lotus, and so forth, a moon disk arises from the vowels. Second, a sun disk arises from the consonants. Third, between the two disks is imagined the insignia of the deity marked with the seed-syllable, from which light is emanated and then withdrawn. Fourth, all these elements merge. Fifth, from the merged elements, the body of the deity fully manifests.

Kongtrül says that most generation stage sadhanas include meditating using "three beings":

- The pledge-being - the deity generated through ritual steps, the main deity being meditated upon.
- The pristine-awareness being - a deity that is imagined at the heart of the pledge deity on a lotus or sun seat. According to Kongtrül, "it may be visualized in different ways: as a deity identical to the pledge deity; as a deity unlike the pledge deity in color and [appearance and number of] faces and arms; or as an insignia that has arisen from a seed-syllable."
- The contemplation-being - A seed-syllable or insignia at the heart of the pristine-awareness being. Kongtrül states that if the pristine-awareness being is being visualized as an insignia, the contemplation-being would be visualized as a seed-syllable.

According to Kongtrül "the placement of the three beings may be done for all the deities or for only the main deities."

Completing the generation stage contemplation can include different elements, including "the drawing in of the pristine-awareness mandala, conferral of initiation, sealing of different types, and nectar-tasting, offering, and praise." To draw in the pristine-awareness mandala, one imagines light radiating from the syllable at the heart which invites the mandala of deities to merge with the pledge being. This helps develop the pride that oneself and all deities are of the same nature. The initiation is performed by propitiating the deities and imagining that they bestow an initiation through pouring water and so on which has a cleansing effect.

According to Kongtrül, whenever one trains in the generation phase, one must see everything that arises as a relative and empty appearance, devoid of inherent nature, and one must also see them all as illusions. The goal of this contemplation phase is to reach a pristine awareness in which the appearance of the deity is blissful and beyond all conceptual elaborations and manifests as "the essence of bliss and emptiness." At the end of the meditation session, the visualized environment and deities dissolves into oneself, and one dissolves into luminous clarity. Then one re-emerges in "the illusion-like form of the deity."

Mipham states that there are three main principles of generation stage practice: (1) clear appearance, (2) divine pride, and (3) the recollection of purity.

First, the forms, spiritual life force, mantra chains, and radiation and absorption of light rays should be visualized with great clarity as the objects experienced in absorption. Second, without thinking of the deity as something that merely appears before the mind, one should have the divine pride of being indivisible from the deity. Third, the deity should not be viewed as something that exists as an individual stream of being, in a limited form with characteristics of its own name and form. Rather, one should recall that it is the ultimate fruitional wisdom, the perfection of abandonment and realization, that manifests in the form of the deity and mantra.

==== Post-meditation practice ====
There are various instructions for informal contemplation, i.e. the post-meditation period when the yogi is not involved in formal sadhana practice. Kongtrül outlines eight of these:

- Mantra recitation
- Sacrificial offerings to the deities and spirits
- The yoga of partaking of food and drink.
- The yoga of passion performed with an action seal.
- The yoga of conduct between formal meditation sessions.
- The yoga of sleep.
- The yoga of waking up at dawn.
- The yoga of purificatory cleansing.

Ju Mipham explains post-meditation training as follows:

In between sessions, any adverse conditions that one encounters, such as being distracted by sense pleasures, should be avoided by understanding them to be obstacles. Moreover, one should not be discouraged if illness, negative forces, thoughts, or any other unfortunate circumstances develop. Rather, one should think that such occurrences are exhausting one's negative karma. Any factor that is taught to pose a threat to the accomplishment of mantra, such as keeping company of degenerates, should be cast far away. Things that are prohibited in other situations, such as meat and alcohol, are to be transformed into beneficial substances in secret mantra via mantra, visualization, and mudrā. One should, however, practice the various methods for gathering the accumulations and purifying obscurations, as these are conducive circumstances for the accomplishment of mantra. To purify one's being, one should have stable faith and firmly abide by the samayas and pledges one has made. One should also apply oneself to the instructions that develop the power of mantra, such as the recitation of the Sanskrit alphabet. Clothing, jewelry, food, drink, and all other such factors should be transformed into the play of wisdom by utilizing mantras, visualizations, and mudrās. In this way, adverse conditions should be avoided, while conducive circumstances should be assembled. Through this, the activity of accomplishing mantra should be brought to a point of culmination without letting up until mantra has been accomplished.

=== Completion stage ===
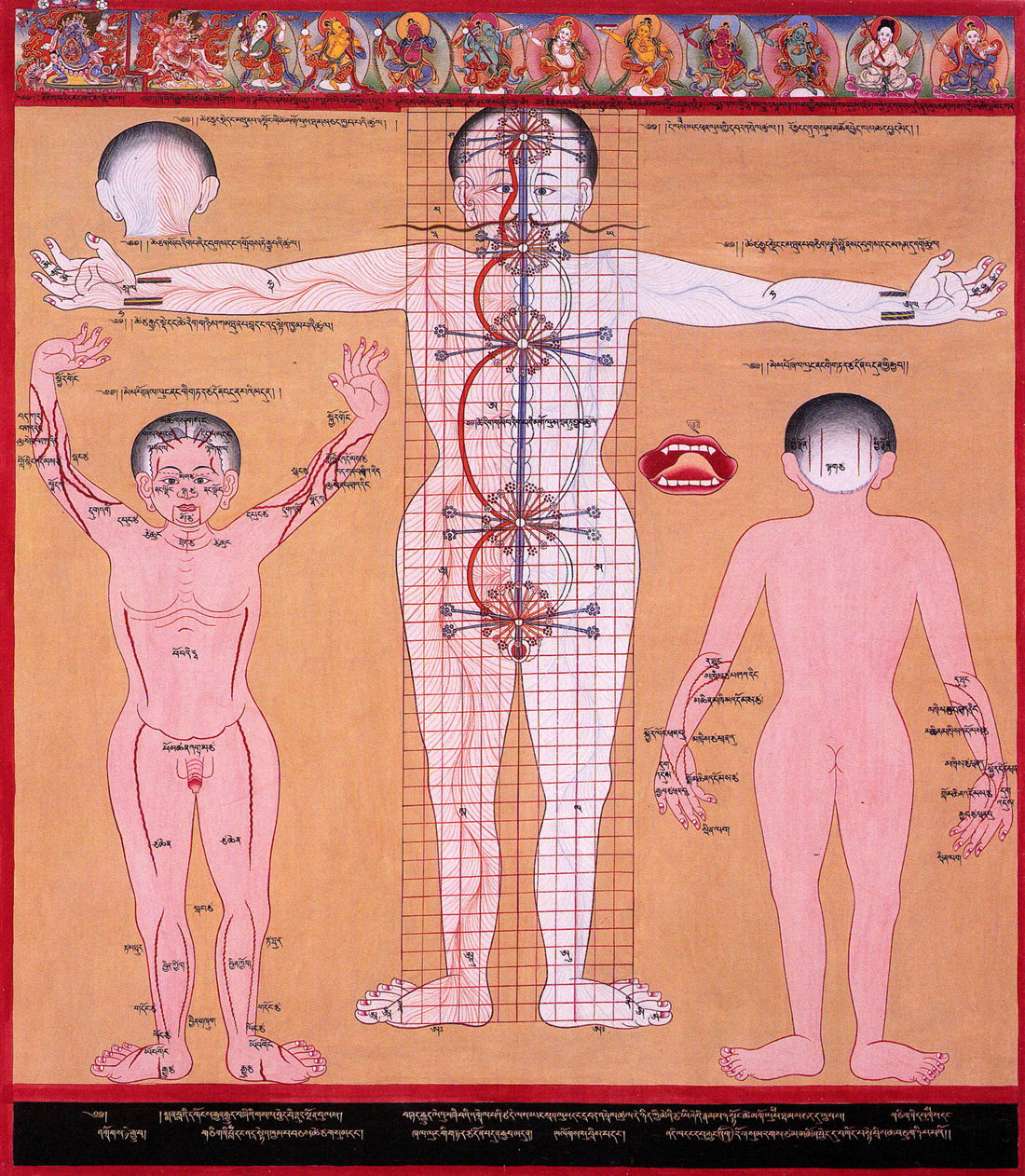
A Tibetan illustration depicting the central channel and the two side channels as well as five chakras where the channels loop around each other. The bindus are tiny subtle particles of energy found in the subtle body.

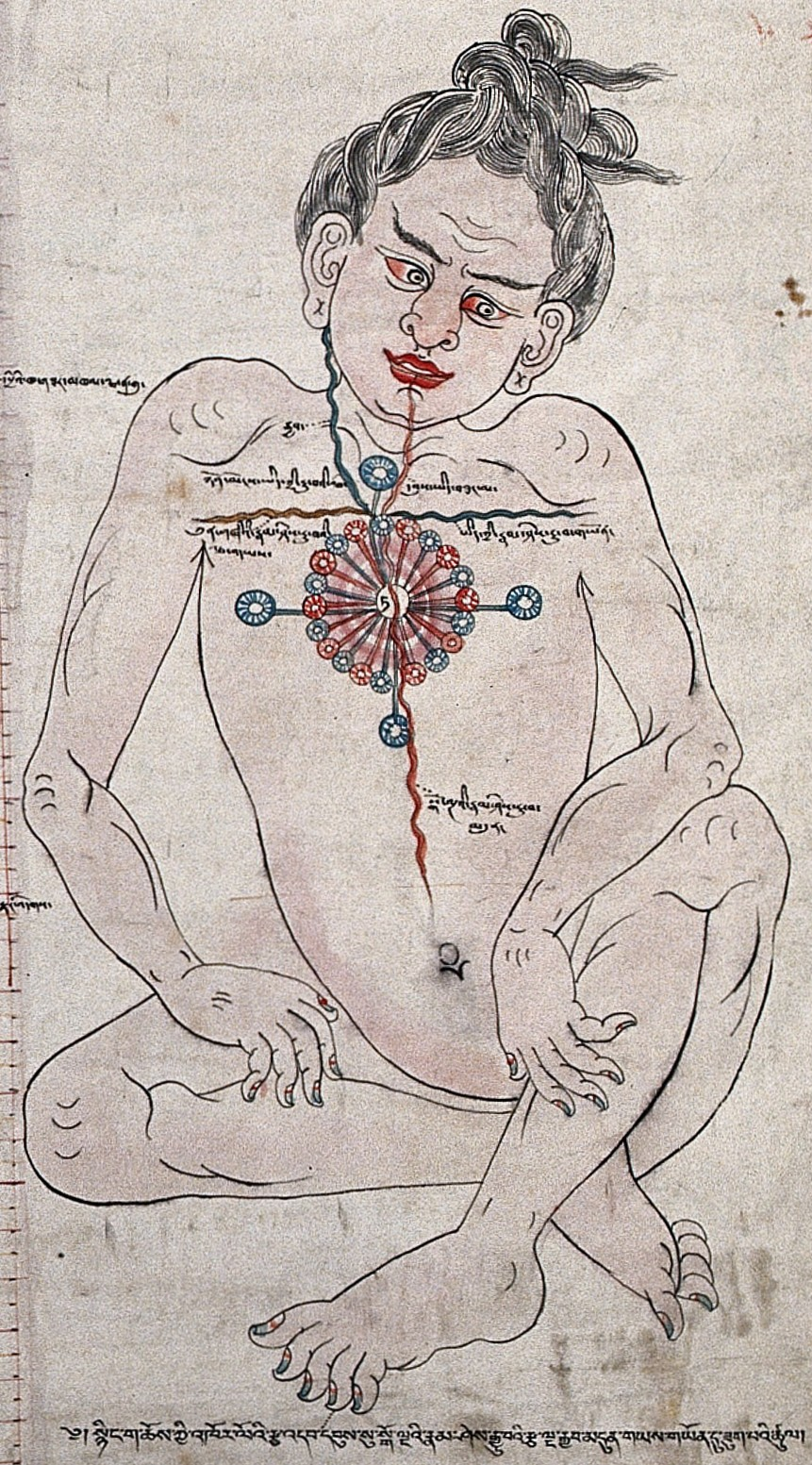
A depiction of the heart chakra from a Tibetan Medicine text

The completion stage (rdzogs rim, also "perfection" or "fulfillment" stage), also known as "the yoga of the natural state," is the second stage of Unsurpassed Yoga Tantra. According to Kongtrül the Sanskrit equivalent to rdzogs is niṣpanna, "meaning the ultimately true, or the natural state. 'Completion' therefore denotes what is ultimately true, the natural state, or the nature of things."

Jamgön Kongtrül writes that the main characteristic of Completion Stage practice is non-conceptual great bliss arising from the melting of the vital essences (bindus) in the subtle body which allows the yogi to realize the true nature of reality, bodhicitta. Bodhicitta is here defined as the inseparability of emptiness and compassion (understood as the pristine awareness of unchanging great bliss). This yoga, which focuses on directing the vital winds into the central channel is also termed the "vajra yoga of the union of method and wisdom."

Ju Mipham meanwhile, writes that in the completion stage (also known as the "path of the innate" or "path of direct perception"), "the profound methodical pith instructions actualize the tantra of the ground, the great purity and equality that dwells within as the maṇḍala of spontaneous presence."

Before practicing the completion stage, most masters agree that one should first gain stability in the generation phase, having developed clear appearance of the images and firm divine pride. This is because, as Kongtrül writes "the creation-phase contemplations, once a special connection has developed act as ripening agents for the arising of the realization of the completion phase."

There are different aspects of Completion practice. Kongtrül states that all Completion Stage practice can be included in two aspects: "the causal phase of completion and the resultant phase." Kongtrül's analysis also divides the completion stage into the path of method (thabs lam) or the path of liberation ('grol lam). Mipham makes a similar distinction between "(1) the path with characteristics, which is based on keeping an object in mind and applying physical and verbal effort and (2) the path without characteristics, which is effortless."

The Tibetologist David Germano also outlines two main types of completion stage practice: The first type is a formless contemplation on the ultimate empty nature of the mind, without using any visual images. The second type refers to various meditations using features of the subtle body to produce energetic bodily sensations of bliss and inner warmth. In the path of method, one engages in various yogas associated with the subtle body.

==== Completion practices ====
The embodied energetic practices associated with the completion stage make use of a tantric schema of human psycho-physiology composed of "energy channels" (Skt. nadi, Tib. rtsa), "winds" or vital currents (vāyu, rlung), and "energetic drops" or charged particles (bindu, thig le) which are said to converge at certain places along the central channel called chakras (lit. "wheels"). The subtle body energies are seen as "mounts" for consciousness, the physical component of awareness and are engaged in order to generate the 'great bliss' (bde-mchog; maha-sukha) which is used to attain enlightenment.

According to Mipham all practices of the completion stage can be included in two categories:

1. the application of the key points of the support (the channels, energies, and essences) through yogic exercises, vase breathing, the blissful melting of the subtle essence, and so forth; and
2. the application of the key points of the supported (the essence of luminosity), such as the practice of empty forms (in the Kalachakra system) or direct crossing (the Dzogchen practice of thogal).

Kongtrül states that there are three main elements that are common to all completion stage systems:

- The practice that relies on one's own body as method, in this, one strikes the crucial point related to the central channel by making winds enter, abide, and dissolve in it. This includes the practice of inner fire and illusory body, which can be applied in different ways (in dreams, sleep, the death process, etc.).
- The practice that relies on the body of another person as the wisdom aspect. In this, one elicits and stabilizes the pristine awareness of the four joys.
- The practice that relies on the great seal of empty form. In this, one cultivates the emptiness endowed with the supreme of all aspects and unchanging bliss

Kongtrül explains the central Completion Stage practice of causing the winds to enter the central channel (which he terms "self-blessing") as follows:

Self-blessing denotes meditation for which the principal focuses—a flame, sphere, syllable, and so on—are visualized within the central channel (regardless of whether or not one actually visualizes the central channel). It is natural that winds gather wherever the mind is focused. Through practice of this meditation, the winds [vayu] gather, whereupon they first enter, then dwell, and finally dissolve in the middle of the particular channel-wheel [chakra] one is focused on in meditation. When the winds dissolve, the process of dissolution of the different levels of subtle and coarse [psycho-physical] constituents occurs, along with many experiences of extraordinary bliss ensuing from the melting of vital essence [bindu].

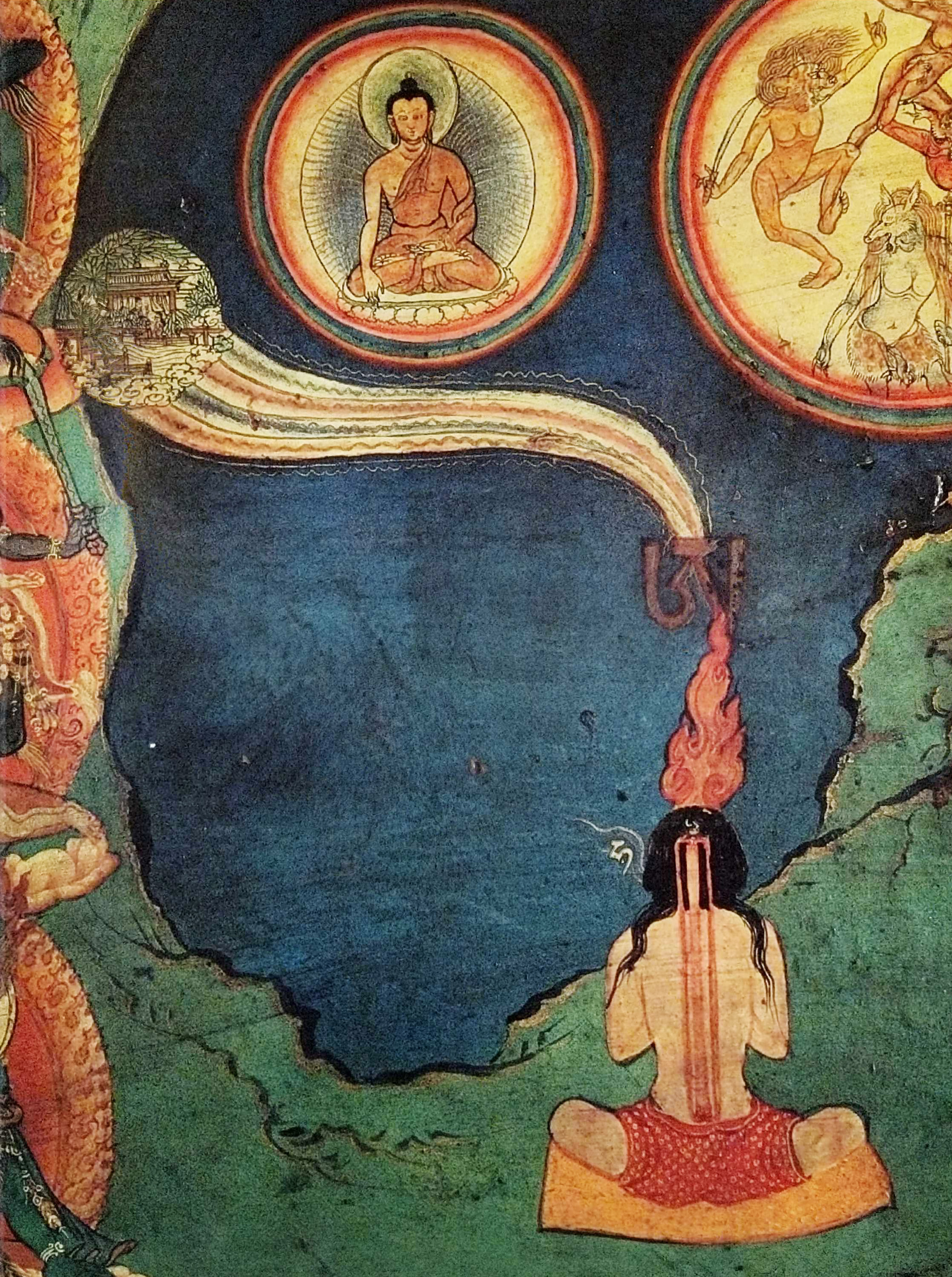
A section of the Northern wall mural at the Lukhang Temple depicting tummo, the three channels (nadis) and phowa

One of the most widespread methods for causing the winds to enter the central channel is tummo (caṇḍālī, inner heat, literally "fierce woman"). This practice is done in many different ways and applied to numerous other practices. The basic method involves somekind of visualization that symbolizes heat or fire (the red vital essence, i.e. bindu) at the chakra below the navel as well as breathing techniques such as vase-shaped holding of the breath (bum pa can, kumbhaka). This ignites the inner heat, which moves up the central channel and melts the white vital essence (bindu, thigle) located in the head. This white vital essence drips down the central channel, filling the body with bliss.

Inner fire practice is the foundation of the other completion yogas, such as yogic sexual union (karmamudrā), luminosity (clear light) yoga, illusory body yoga, dream yoga, and phowa (transference of consciousness). The practice of these yogas may also be supplemented with various physical exercises, called trul khor.

Alexander Berzin explains (from the Gelug perspective) how the vital wind practices lead to the other yogas:

On the complete stage, we cause the energy-winds (rlung, Skt. prana) to enter, abide, and dissolve in the central channel. This enables us to access the subtlest level of mental activity (clear light, ‘ od-gsal) and use it for the nonconceptual cognition of voidness – the immediate cause for the omniscient mind of a Buddha. We use the subtlest level of energy-wind, which supports clear light mental activity, to arise in the form of an illusory body (sgyu-lus) as the immediate cause for the network of form bodies (Skt. rupakaya) of a Buddha.

Luminosity or 'clear light' (Tibetan od gsal, Sanskrit prabhāsvara) refers to the radiant nature of mind, also described as the primordially pure ground, which may be experienced through meditation, through inner heat yoga, during great bliss, in sleep and during the dying process. To reach this, a yogi trains to access this luminous mind experience through various methods, which then give rise to various signs (such as the visions of a mirage, smoke, flickering lights like fireflies, etc.).

Illusory body practice is a series of meditations which allow one to recognize the illusory nature of the body and also of all phenomena since as Kongtrul states "each and every phenomenon of existence and liberation is the body of illusion." The actual practice of this includes contemplating the illusory nature of things by way of the various teachings of the Buddha and the various examples or similes (such a mirage, a rainbow, a reflection, a dream and so on). It also includes the unique tantric practice of meditating on the "pure illusory body," i.e. the form of the deity's body and their mandala seen as an illusory display. After stabilizing these two, one practices the "hidden" illusory body, which pairs the practice of the winds and channels and the corresponding bliss and luminous clarity, with the illusory body contemplation.

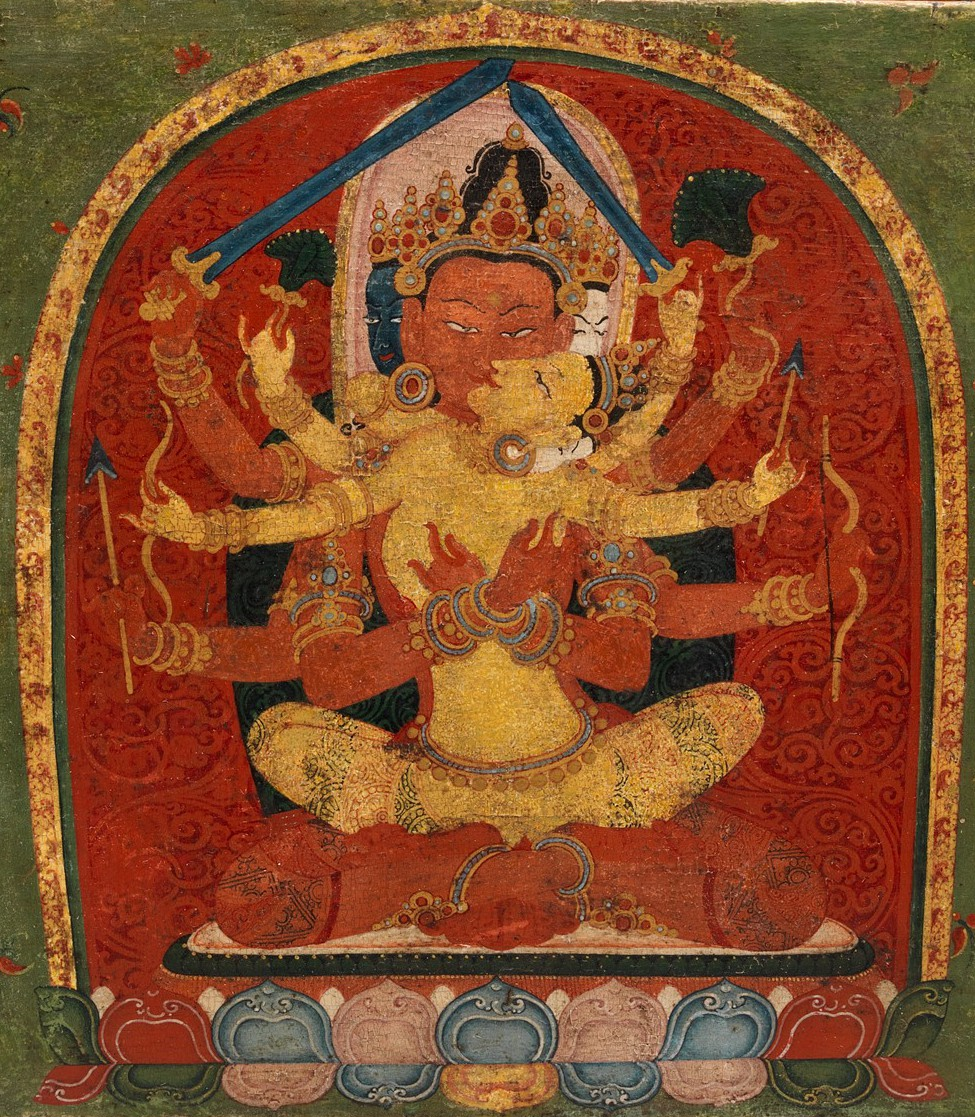
Mañjuvajra and consort, central deities of the Guhyasamaja cycle

Karmamudrā ("action seal," Tib. las-kyi phyag-rgya) also called "the mandala circle," is a yoga which entails sexual union with either a physical or a visualized consort. The tantras describe this as including full penetration (using euphemisms such as vajra and lotus for the penis and the vagina). For example, the Vajra Rosary Tantra chapter 14, verse 8 states: "The vajra and lotus joining is known as the supreme yoga."

This practice is found in most of the major Unsurpassed Yoga Tantras and in numerous systems like the Six Yogas of Naropa, Lamdre, and Anuyoga. In this practice, one first causes the winds to enter into the central channel as practiced in tummo and then joins in union with a consort (actual or imaged). This causes the vital winds to enter, dwell and dissolve in the central channel simultaneously, causing great bliss and the "four joys" which allows one to access pristine awareness. All Tibetan traditions agree that qualified lay practitioners (including former monks) can use physical consorts as the Indian mahasiddhas ("great adepts") did. For example, Atisa wrote that "those (consecrations) on which the householder may rely include everything taught in the tantras." There are different stances on whether current monks can engage in the practice. The Buddhist scholar Tripitakamala felt the overall goal of Buddhahood overrides concerns for monastic vows.

Other completion practices like dream yoga entails mastering lucid dreaming and practicing meditation in one's dreams. Meanwhile, phowa (transference of consciousness) and bardo yogas are yogas done during one's death and help yogis navigate the dying process.

There many systems of completion stage practices, drawn from numerous tantric texts and commentaries. For example, Jamgön Kongtrül in his Treasury of Knowledge (Book 8, Part 3) outlines the systems of two "father" tantras, the Guhyasamāja and Yamari, and seven "mother" tantras: the Kalachakra, Hevajra, Cakrasaṃvara, Chatuhpitha, Mahamaya, Buddhakapala, and Tara Yogini. Other completion stage systems, such as the Six Dharmas of Naropa and the Six Dharmas of Niguma are not tied to a specific tantric scripture and instead rely on oral traditions which draw on numerous tantras. There are also various completion stage practices in the Nyingma tradition, which are somewhat different to those of the Sarma schools and are found in the Anuyoga and Dzogchen literature.

==== Example of a father tantra system: Guhyasamāja ====
One example of an influential father tantra system is that of the Guhyasamāja (Gathering of Secrets). This is often presented in five sequential stages of practice (derived from the Arya Nagarjuna tradition):

1. Vajra recitation, or voice isolation; which causes the vital winds to enter, abide and dissolve in the central channel. This practice entails the use of the mantra Om Ah Hung and the use of pranayama methods. This is done in three ways: meditating on the vital essence of light at the nose-tip of the face; on the indestructible vital essence at the heart chakra; and on the vital essence of substance at the secret place (pubic region chakra).
2. Focusing the mind, or mental isolation; The essence of this is pristine awareness of bliss and emptiness that manifests through the stabilization of the vital essence after the thought generating winds have dissolved in the central channel.
3. Self-consecration, or the relative-truth illusory body; The illusory-body stage is described as being caused by the "wind-mind of luminous clarity" and the bliss arising from the dissolution of the vital winds into the indestructible vital essence at the center of the heart chakra. It is experienced as the illusory mandala of the deity or as seeing the illusory nature of body/reality. There are four aspects of cultivating the illusory-body: illusion in meditative equipoise; illusion in post-equipoise; illusion in dreams; and illusion in the intermediate state.
4. The stage of actual awakening, or the ultimate-truth luminous clarity; is "a path that brings about direct realization of the emptiness of innate great bliss" and its main function is "to vanquish the seeds of the emotional afflictions as well as their winds."
5. The stage of nondual pristine awareness, or the union of the two truths; This is the inseparable union of the great bliss that directly realizes the nature of reality; and the infinitude of pristine-awareness mandalas.

==== Example of a mother tantra system: Cakrasaṃvara ====
A vajra-cross, or "double vajra" (vishva vajra)

An example of an influential mother tantra completion phase system is that of the Cakrasaṃvara Tantra ("The binding of the chakras"), which Kongtrül calls "the very heart of the mother tantras." There are different practiced traditions of this tantra.

Ghantapa's (a.k.a. Vajraghantapa) Five Stages of Cakrasaṃvara has the following yogic phases

- The stage of self-consecration, in which one causes the vital winds to enter into the central channel in order to manifest the great bliss of vital essence in the four chakras. It consists of two aspects:
  - Self-consecration with seed-syllable; One imagines oneself as the deity, and meditates on a tiny red sphere at the heart chakra, imagining that the winds enter and dissolve there. Then there follows a contemplation in which two spheres emanate from the heart and settle in the eyes. One then holds the mind on those two spheres, with eyes closed or staring at darkness. One then applies this contemplation to the other senses. Once familiar with the practice, one applies it whenever one experiences any object with the senses. Then one adds further elements to this contemplation, such as a blue sphere on top of the red, a seed syllable, etc.
  - Self-consecration with-out seed-syllable; One imagines oneself as the deity, and imagines there is a light in the hollow interior of the body, moving in and out, in sync with the breath. It reaches a point at the tip of the nose and then turns back through the body until it reaches the point below the navel, from where it fills the entire body. Then one practices vajra breathing which syncs the rhythm of the breath with the sounds of three syllables. This process is also practiced by directing the light to the eyes, the nose, ears, tongue and center of the heart.
- The vajra-cross stage; According to Kongtrül this stage "halts the ordinary movement of the upper and lower winds in the left and right channels and strikes the crucial point in the coming and going of that vital essence of great bliss." It consists of three aspects:
  - Vajra-cross with seed-syllable; One imagines oneself as the deity in union with consort and focuses on a tetrahedron and vajra in their secret places (i.e. sex organ) as well as on a multi-colored vajra-cross above one's head which radiates light, drawing in all the buddhas. This light enters through the crown of the head and descends to the secret place, becoming a sphere. It is done with the breath-holding technique of vase breath.
  - Vajra-cross with different forms; One imagines the visualization of deities in union with vajra in the secret place as before, which now radiates forth two vajras, with syllable and sphere, which settle in the eyes. One also images vajras in the ears, nose, tongue and sex organ. Focusing on these leads to bliss. Then one focuses on a vajra at the navel while practicing breath control, then the same is practiced with the heart, throat and crown chakras.
  - Vajra-cross without seed-syllable; during which one synchronizes different visualizations with the breath, such as a sun disk at the brow, a moon disk above the sun disk, five colored spheres above the sun disk.
- The stage of filling the jewel; which is the practice of generating the four blisses (joys) by practicing with a seal and performing various visualizations and mantras which melt the bodhicitta and cause it flow down the central channel. Four seals are taught, Kongtrül defines them thus: "The pledge seal is the generation of joy using an imagined pristine-awareness seal. This seal serves as a preliminary to the others. The action seal, the generation of bliss using an actual awareness female, forms the main practice. The phenomena seal, preserving bliss by bringing to mind what was previously experienced, forms the concluding practice. The great seal is meditation on essential reality after one has practiced the other seals."
- The Jalandhara stage (also called maintaining the blaze), one visualizes five tiny spheres of different colors below the navel and practices the vase-shaped holding of the breath, imagining the vital winds being absorbed into the spheres during the breath hold. This leads to the blazing of the inner fire (or mirage like signs). Then as one practices breath control, one imagines that light from the four spheres gathers in the central channel while a flame rises from the central sphere. The flame moves up the channel, exits from the brow and enters all Buddhas. One images that the pristine awareness and blessings of the all buddhas enter one's body along with fire and nectar.
- The stage of the inconceivable; this is the stage through which the state of union is perfected. This fifth stage consists of meditation on emptiness with bliss as its precondition. It comprises two aspects:
  - Mind entering emptiness; All appearances of deities and so forth are dissolved into light and absorbed into a syllable on a moon disk. One focuses on this for sometime and then dissolves it into space. Then one remains in uncontrived contemplation, free of all concepts.
  - Emptiness entering mind; Following the previous meditation, one appears instantaneously as the body of the deity and one seals this appearance with the previous experience of emptiness. In post-meditation, one images all external appearances manifesting as forms of the deity and as empty. One also practices this before sleep.

==== Completion in Nyingma ====
Kongtrül and Mipham divide the Nyingma completion stage into the path of method (thabs lam) or the path of liberation ('grol lam). In Nyingma, path of method practices are known as the “upper door” (steng sgo) practice of inner heat and the "lower door" (’og sgo) of practice with a consort (as stated in the Oceanic Magical Manifestation Tantra). The goal of these yogas is to manifest the pristine awareness that is the union of emptiness and bliss.

Kongtrül outlines the Nyingma Completion Stage "path of methods" as follows:

The first is the method to realize the innate pristine awareness of bliss from the melting [of vital essence], immutable supreme bliss. It comprises two sets of esoteric instructions. One concerns the "upper door," a sequential method to elicit innate pristine awareness through meditation techniques related to the four channel-wheels. The other concerns the "lower door," a method of simultaneity to elicit innate pristine awareness by means of the union of the "space" [of the female] and the "secret" [of the male].

The path of liberation may refer to extraordinary cases when a person recognizes their true nature immediately during tantric initiation (as was the case with king Indrabhuti). The path of liberation also refers to contemplative methods for directly recognizing the nature of mind without the use of the methods like inner heat and so forth. According to Kongtrül, in Nyingma Anuyoga, there are three approaches to this, "the minds of analysis, the meaning, and letters." Analysis refers to using logical reasoning to establish the nature of things, "meaning" refers to contemplating the true nature of reality, without using thoughts or symbols and "letters" refers to meditation using a seed syllable or mantra.

Mipham states that the emphasis of the path of liberation is "exceptional study, contemplation, and meditation, which lead to a decisive insight into the spontaneously perfected great maṇḍala, in which all phenomena are primordially enlightened as self-occurring wisdom." There are two ways of accomplishing this according to Mipham:

- The instantaneous path of gifted individuals, "for whom realization and familiarization are simultaneous."
- The gradual path, in which one first studies and contemplates in order to resolve the view, and then one trains in meditation in order to develop the strength of absorption.

==== Mahāmudrā and Dzogchen ====
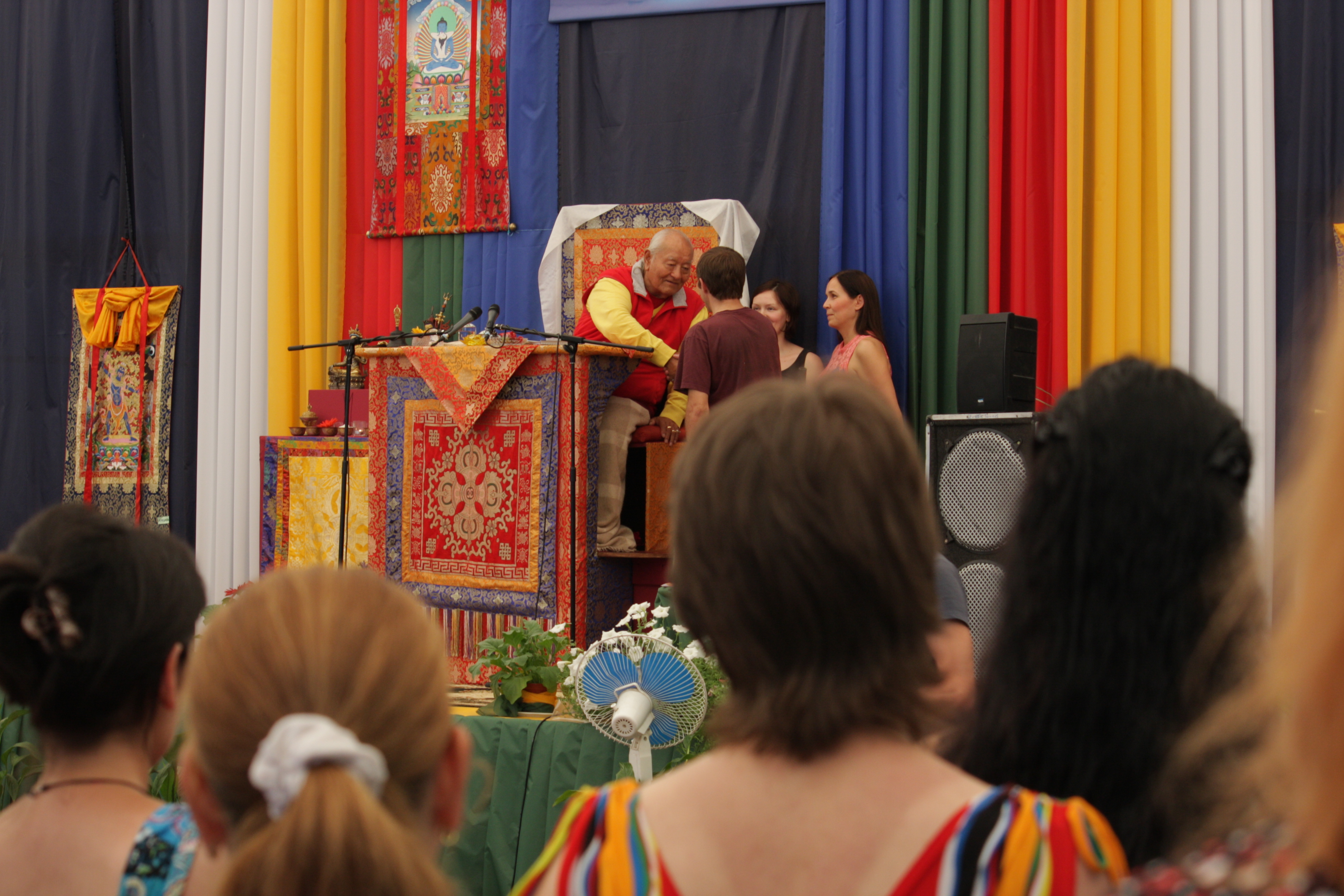
Dzogchen master Chögyal Namkhai Norbu interacting with students

Mahāmudrā ("Great Seal") and Dzogchen ("Great Perfection") are terms which are sometimes used to refer to the pinnacle of completion stage practice, and the state one is aiming for during completion practice.

Mahāmudrā can thus refer to a yogic stage practiced after one has mastered subtly body yogas. According to Kongtrül, this is a stage in which the yogi "remains in a state of even contemplation of the bliss-emptiness pristine awareness alone." This causes the winds to gather leading to a special bliss of the melted vital essence. Another method refers to directing the vital essence into the central channel and discursive thought into luminous clarity, which leads to "the nondual pristine awareness dimension of awakening."

In Tibetan Buddhism, Mahāmudrā and Dzogchen are also sometimes considered to transcend the two stages and to be a separate path or vehicle (yana) in and of themselves. In this sense, these yogas are said to be direct methods for accessing the very nature of reality, which is variously termed "the nature of mind," Dharmakaya or "the Great Seal" in the Mahāmudrā lineages, or the "basis" (gzhi) in Dzogchen lineages.

In Nyingma, Dzogchen is a separate vehicle (the Atiyoga vehicle) and it is seen as a superior method to the tantric practice of the two stages. Mipham states that this path does not use methods which require effort, such as the subtle energy practices,

Instead, they will be able to enter this state merely by the power of the master's key instructions and the transference of blessings. In either case, this is the sacred fruition of all other completion stage practices. Moreover, the master's key instructions enable one to recognize, directly and nakedly, that the nature of one's own mind is empty yet aware, that it is self-occurring wisdom, innately free from constructs. With this recognition, one comes to rest in a state without accepting or rejecting and without artifice or fabrication.

After being introduced to the ultimate by one's master, one then trains according to this understanding. Continued training, through constantly resting in that state without contrivance, stabilizes one's experience of the ultimate over time. In practice however, Dzogchen practice is often also paired with the two stages of tantric yoga.

Similarly, in the Kagyu schools, Mahāmudrā is also sometimes seen as a separate path (known as the vehicle of self-liberation, or Sahajayana). However, it is usually practiced together as part of the tantric yogas (for example, in the "Fivefold Mahāmudrā" method).

In Sakya, Mahāmudrā is the culmination and the goal of the practice of the two stages. It is not a separate vehicle.

== See also ==
- Bornless Ritual – Ritual of Western ceremonial magic
- Chinese Esoteric Buddhism – Traditions of Vajrayana Buddhism
- Yujia Yankou - Example of a ritual involving deity yoga in mainstream Chinese Buddhism
- Ganachakra – Tantric assemblies or feasts
- Guru yoga – Tantric Buddhist meditation practice
- Shingon Buddhism – Tradition of Japanese Buddhism
