= Judith Simmer-Brown =

Judith Simmer-Brown is a Distinguished Professor of Contemplative and Religious Studies Emerita at Naropa University. She has expertise in Tibetan Buddhism, Women and Buddhism, Buddhist-Christian dialogue, Western Buddhism and Contemplative Education. She is an acharya — a senior Buddhist teacher — in the Shambhala Buddhist tradition and was a senior student of Chögyam Trungpa Rinpoche. She serves on the board of the Society of Buddhist-Christian Studies, and is on the steering committee of the Contemplative Studies Group of the American Academy of Religion. Previously she was a member of the Lilly Buddhist-Christian Theological Encounter.

== Life ==
She was raised as a minister's daughter in Nebraska, and graduated from Cornell College in Iowa (BA History and Religion); Florida State University (MA Religious Studies); and Columbia University Religious Studies, ABD. After studying at University of British Columbia in Buddhist Studies, she received her PhD from Walden University. Previously, she taught at Bensalem College and at Fordham University, Western Washington University, Fairhaven College, and Whatcom Community College. In 1980, she married Richard Brown and has two children and three grandchildren.

== Writings ==
- Simmer-Brown, Judith and Fran Grace (2011). Meditation and the Classroom: Contemplative Pedagogy for Religious Studies. SUNY Press. ISBN 1438437889
- Simmer-Brown, Judith (2001). Dakini's Warm Breath: The Feminine Principle in Tibetan Buddhism. Shambhala Publications. ISBN 1-57062-720-7 Also published in Spanish, French, Dutch, and Polish translations.
- Simmer-Brown, Judith (1999). "Commitment and Openness: A Contemplative Approach to Pluralism," in The Heart of Learning: Spirituality and Education, edited by Steven Glazer. New York: Penguin Putnam, Inc.
- Simmer-Brown, Judith (2000). "A Buddhist Approach to Pluralism: The Dialogue Relationship," Buddhist Theology: Critical Reflections by Contemporary Buddhist Scholars, edited by Roger Jackson and John Makransky. Honolulu: Curzon Press.
- Simmer-Brown, Judith (2006). “The Prospects for a Bhikṣunī Saṅgha in Tibetan Buddhism,” in Buddhist Studies from India to America: Essays in Honor of Charles S. Prebish, edited by Damien Keown. New York and London: RoutledgeCurzon, 2006.
