= Tantric sex =

Sexual practices associated with Hindu and Buddhist tantra

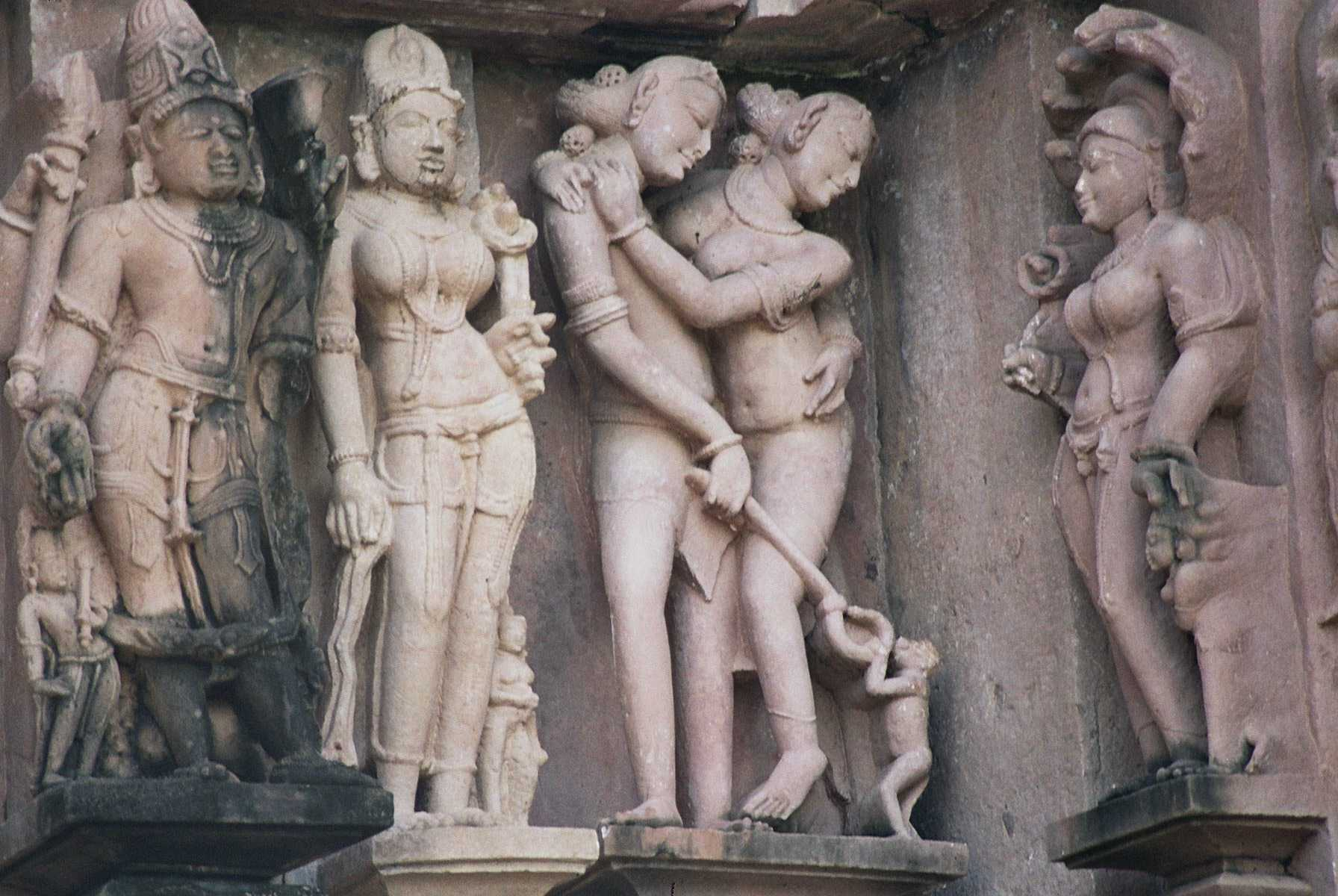
Maithuna, Khajuraho, Madhya Pradesh, India

Tantric sex is any of a range of practices in Hindu and Buddhist tantra that utilize sexual activity in a ritual or yogic context. Tantric sex is associated with antinomian elements such as the consumption of alcohol, and the offerings of substances like meat to deities. Moreover, sexual fluids may be viewed as power substances and used for ritual purposes, either externally or internally.

The actual terms used in the classical texts to refer to this practice include "Karmamudra" (Tibetan: ལས་ཀྱི་ཕྱག་རྒྱ las kyi phyag rgya, "action seal") in Buddhist tantras and "Maithuna" (Devanagari: मैथुन, "coupling") in Hindu sources. In Hindu Tantra, Maithuna is the most important of the five makara (five tantric substances) and constitutes the main part of the Grand Ritual of Tantra variously known as Panchamakara, Panchatattva, and Tattva Chakra. In Tibetan Buddhism, karmamudra is often an important part of the completion stage of tantric practice.

While there may be some connection between these practices and the Kāmashāstra literature (which include the Kāmasūtra), the two practice traditions are separate methods with separate goals. As the British Indologist Geoffrey Samuel notes, while the kāmasāstra literature is about the pursuit of sexual pleasure (kāmā), sexual yoga practices are often aimed towards the quest for liberation (moksha).

== History ==
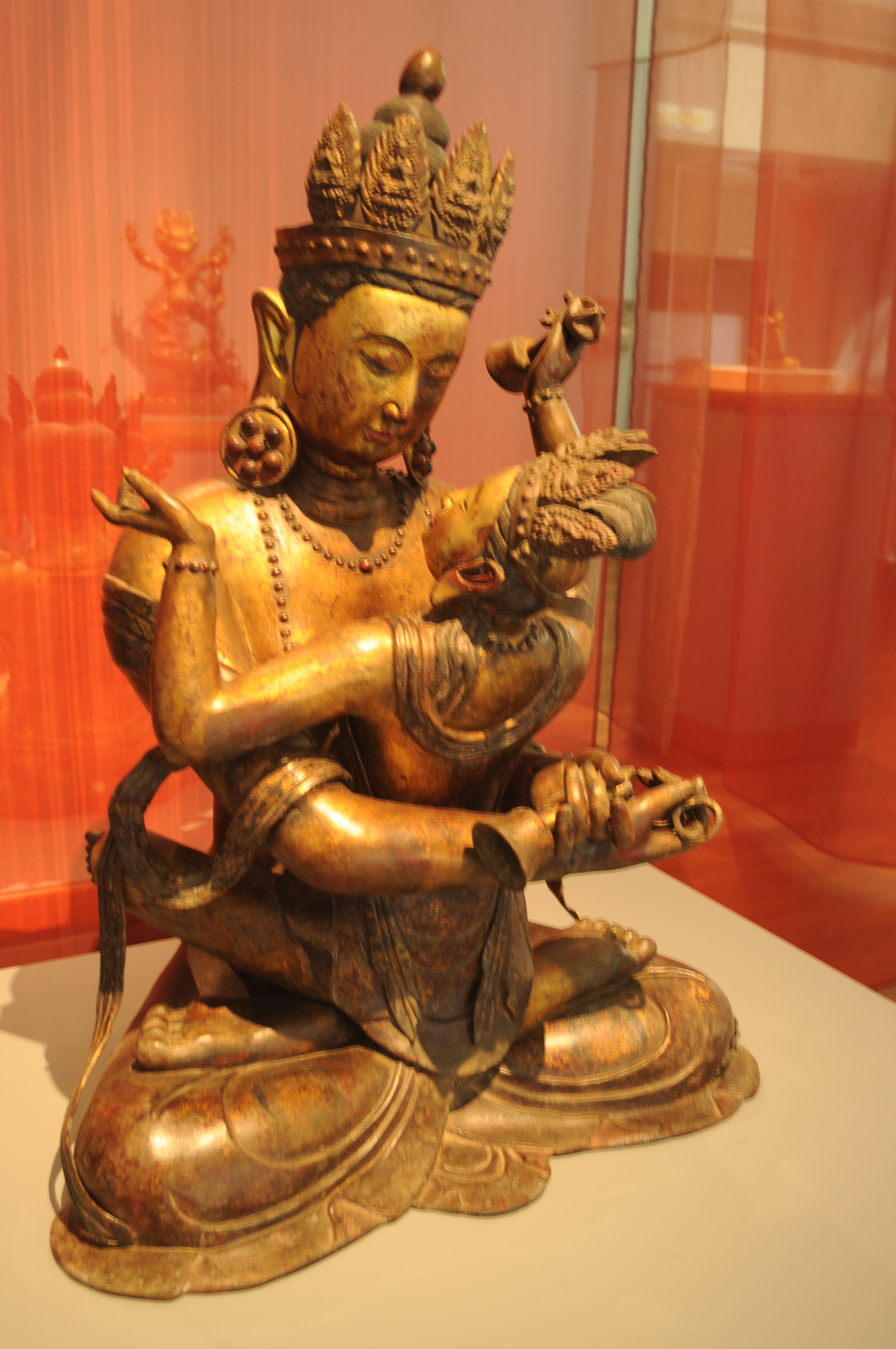
Vajradhara in union with consort

In its earliest forms, Tantric intercourse was usually directed to generate sexual fluids that constituted the "preferred offering of the Tantric deities." There is already a mention of ascetics practicing semen retention in the 4th century CE Mahabharata, although those techniques were rare until late Buddhist Tantra. Up to that point, sexual emission was both allowed and emphasized. Around the start of the first millennium, Tantra began to include practices of semen retention, like the penance ceremony of asidharavrata and the posterior yogic technique of vajroli mudra. They were probably adopted from ancient, non-Tantric celibate schools, like those mentioned in Mahabharata.

The Bṛhadāraṇyaka Upaniṣad contains various sexual rituals and practices that are mostly aimed at obtaining a child and are concerned with the loss of male virility and power. One passage from the Bṛhadāraṇyaka Upaniṣad states:

Her vulva is the sacrificial ground; her pubic hair is the sacred grass; her labia majora are the Soma-press; and her labia minora are the fire blazing at the centre. A man who engages in sexual intercourse with this knowledge obtains as great a world as a man who performs a Soma sacrifice, and he appropriates to himself the merits of the women with whom he has sex. The women, on the other hand, appropriate to themselves the merits of a man who engages in sexual intercourse with them without this knowledge. (Bṛhadāraṇyaka Upaniṣad 6.4.3, trans. Olivelle 1998: 88)

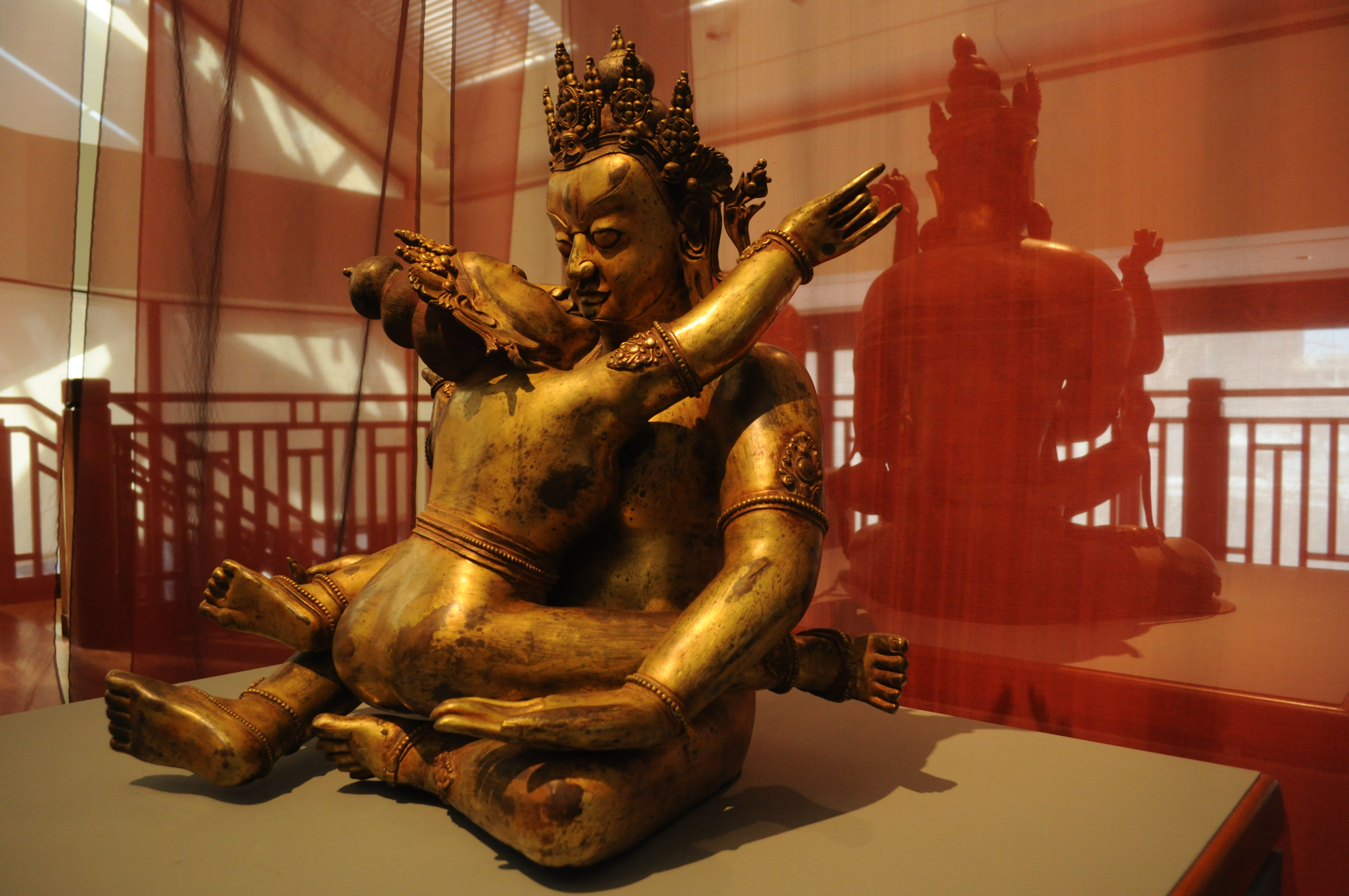
Jambhala (Kubera) deity in Tibet (18th–19th century)

According to Samuel, late Vedic texts like the Jaiminiya Brahmana, the Chandogya Upanisad, and the Brhadaranyaka Upanisad, "treat sexual intercourse as symbolically equivalent to the Vedic sacrifice, and ejaculation of semen as the offering." However, he also writes that while it is possible that some kind of sexual yoga existed in the fourth or fifth centuries, "Substantial evidence for such practices, however, dates from considerably later, from the seventh and eighth centuries, and derives from Saiva and Buddhist Tantric circles."

Tantric sexual practices are often seen as exceptional and elite, and not accepted by all sects. They are found only in some tantric literature belonging to Buddhist and Hindu Tantra, but are entirely absent from Jain Tantra. In the Kaula tradition and others where sexual fluids as power substances and ritual sex are mentioned, scholars disagree in their translations, interpretations and practical significance.

Emotions, eroticism and sex are universally regarded in Tantric literature as natural, desirable, a means of transformation of the deity within. Pleasure and sex is another aspect of life and a "root of the universe", whose purpose extends beyond procreation and is another means to the spiritual journey and its fulfillment. This idea flowers with the inclusion of kama art in Hindu temple arts, and its various temple architecture and design manuals such as the Shilpa-prakasha by the Hindu scholar Ramachandra Kulacara.

== Practice ==
=== In Hinduism ===
The actual term used in Hindu classical texts to refer to this practice is maithuna (Devanagari: मैथुन, "coupling"). In the Hindu Tantras, maithuna is always presented in the context of panchamakara (the five makara or tantric substances) which constitutes primary ritual of Tantra. These may also be referred to as "the five Ms", panchatattva or the tattva chakra, which consist of madya (alcohol), māṃsa (meat), matsya (fish), mudrā (pound grain), and maithuna (sexual intercourse). Taboo-breaking elements are only practiced literally by "left-hand path" tantrics (vāmācārins), whereas "right-hand path" tantrics (dakṣiṇācārins) use symbolic substitutes.

Jayanta Bhatta, the 9th-century scholar of the Nyaya school of Hindu philosophy and who commented on Tantra literature, stated that the Tantric ideas and spiritual practices are mostly well placed, but it also has "immoral teachings" such as by the so-called "Nilambara" sect where its practitioners "wear simply one blue garment, and then as a group engage in unconstrained public sex" on festivals. He wrote, this practice is unnecessary and it threatens fundamental values of society. This sect might have been an offshoot of the Pashupata Shaivite school, or possibly a Buddhist cult of Vajrapani.

Ascetics of the Shaivite school of Mantramarga, in order to gain supernatural power, reenacted the penance of Shiva after cutting off one of Brahma's heads (Bhikshatana). They worshipped Shiva with impure substances like alcohol, blood and sexual fluids generated in orgiastic rites with their consorts.

Douglas Renfrew Brooks states that the antinomian elements such as the use of intoxicating substances and sex were not animistic, but were adopted in some Kaula traditions to challenge the Tantric devotee to break down the "distinctions between the ultimate reality of Brahman and the mundane physical and temporal world" (Maya). By combining erotic and ascetic techniques, states Brooks, the Tantric broke down all social and internal assumptions, became Shiva-like. In Kashmir Shaivism, states David Gray, the antinomian transgressive ideas were internalized, for meditation and reflection, and as a means to "realize a transcendent subjectivity".

As part of tantric inversion of social regulations, sexual yoga often recommends the usage of consorts from the most taboo groups available, such as close relatives or people from the lowest castes. They must be young and beautiful, as well as initiates in tantra.

=== In Buddhism ===
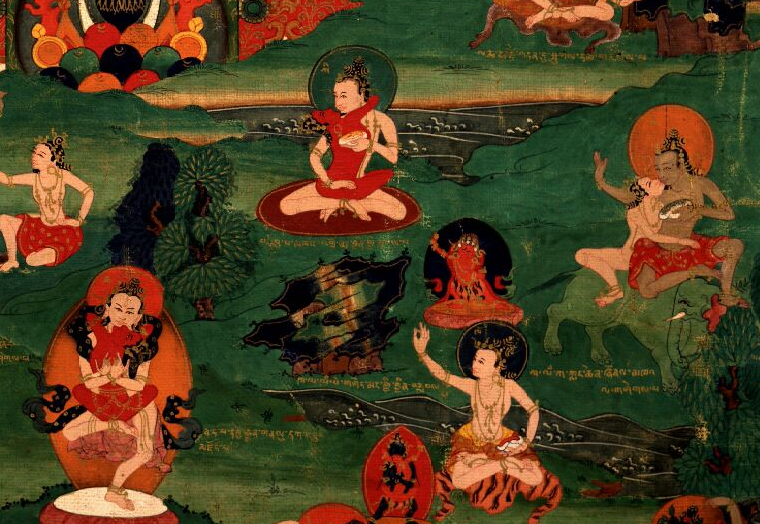
Buddhist Mahasiddhas practicing tantric yoga

According to English, Buddhist sexual rites were incorporated from Shaiva tantra. One of the earliest mentions of sexual yoga is in the Mahayana Buddhist Mahāyānasūtrālamkāra of Asanga (c. 5th century). The passage states:

Supreme self-control is achieved in the reversal of sexual intercourse in the blissful Buddha-poise and the untrammelled vision of one's spouse.

According to David Snellgrove, the text's mention of a ‘reversal of sexual intercourse’ might indicate the practice of withholding ejaculation. Snellgrove states:

It is by no means improbable that already by the fifth century when Asanga was writing, these techniques of sexual yoga were being used in reputable Buddhist circles, and that Asanga himself accepted such a practice as valid. The natural power of the breath, inhaling and exhaling, was certainly accepted as an essential force to be controlled in Buddhist as well as Hindu yoga. Why therefore not the natural power of the sexual force? [...] Once it is established that sexual yoga was already regarded by Asanga as an acceptable yogic practice, it becomes far easier to understand how Tantric treatises, despite their apparent contradiction of previous Buddhist teachings, were so readily canonized in the following centuries.

Deities like Vajrayogini, sexually suggestive and streaming with blood, overturn traditional separation between intercourse and menstruation. Some extreme texts would go further, such as the 9th-century Buddhist text Candamaharosana-tantra, which advocated consumption of bodily waste products of the practitioner's sexual partner, like wash-water of her anus and genitalia. Those were thought to be "power substances", teaching the waste should be consumed as a diet "eaten by all the Buddhas."

==== Japanese Buddhism ====
The 12th-century Japanese school Tachikawa-ryu did not discourage ejaculation in itself, considering it a "shower of love that contained thousands of potential Buddhas". They employed emission of sexual fluids in combination with worshipping of human skulls, which would be coated in the resultant mix in order to create honzon. However, those practices were considered heretical, leading to the sect's suppression.

==== Tibetan Buddhism ====
In Tibetan Buddhism, the higher tantric yogas are generally preceded by preliminary practices (Tib. ngondro), which include sutrayana practices (i.e. non-tantric Mahayana practices) as well as preliminary tantric meditations. Tantric initiation is required to enter into the practice of tantra.

Tibetan tantric practice refers to the main tantric practices in Tibetan Buddhism. The great Rime scholar Jamgön Kongtrül refers to this as "the Process of Meditation in the Indestructible Way of Secret Mantra" and also as "the way of mantra," "way of method" and "the secret way" in his Treasury of Knowledge. These Vajrayāna Buddhist practices are mainly drawn from the Buddhist tantras and are generally not found in "common" (i.e. non-tantric) Mahayana. These practices are seen by Tibetan Buddhists as the fastest and most powerful path to Buddhahood.

The practices described in Unsurpassable Yoga Tantra, (Skt. anuttarayogatantra, also known as Mahayoga) are in turn seen as the highest tantric practices in Tibetan Buddhism. Anuttarayoga tantric practice is divided into two stages, the generation stage and the completion stage. In the generation stage, one meditates on emptiness and visualizes one's chosen deity (yidam), its mandala and companion deities, resulting in identification with this divine reality (called "divine pride"). This is also known as deity yoga (devata yoga).

In the completion stage, the focus is shifted from the form of the deity to direct realization of ultimate reality (which is defined and explained in various ways). Completion stage practices also include techniques that work with the subtle body substances (Skt. bindu, Tib. thigle) and "vital winds" (vayu, lung), as well as the luminous or clear light nature of the mind. They are often grouped into different systems, such as the six dharmas of Naropa, or the six yogas of Kalachakra.

Karmamudrā refers to the female yogini who engages in such a practice and the technique which makes use of sexual union with a physical or visualized consort as well as the practice of inner heat (tummo) to achieve a non-dual state of bliss and insight into emptiness. In Tibetan Buddhism, proficiency in tummo yoga, a completion stage practice, is generally seen as a prerequisite to the practice of karmamudrā.

== See also ==
- Coitus reservatus
- Edging, a modern practice
- Kundalini
- Mahamudra
- Neotantra
- Yab-yum
- Yogini
