= Ganachakra =

Tantric assemblies or feasts

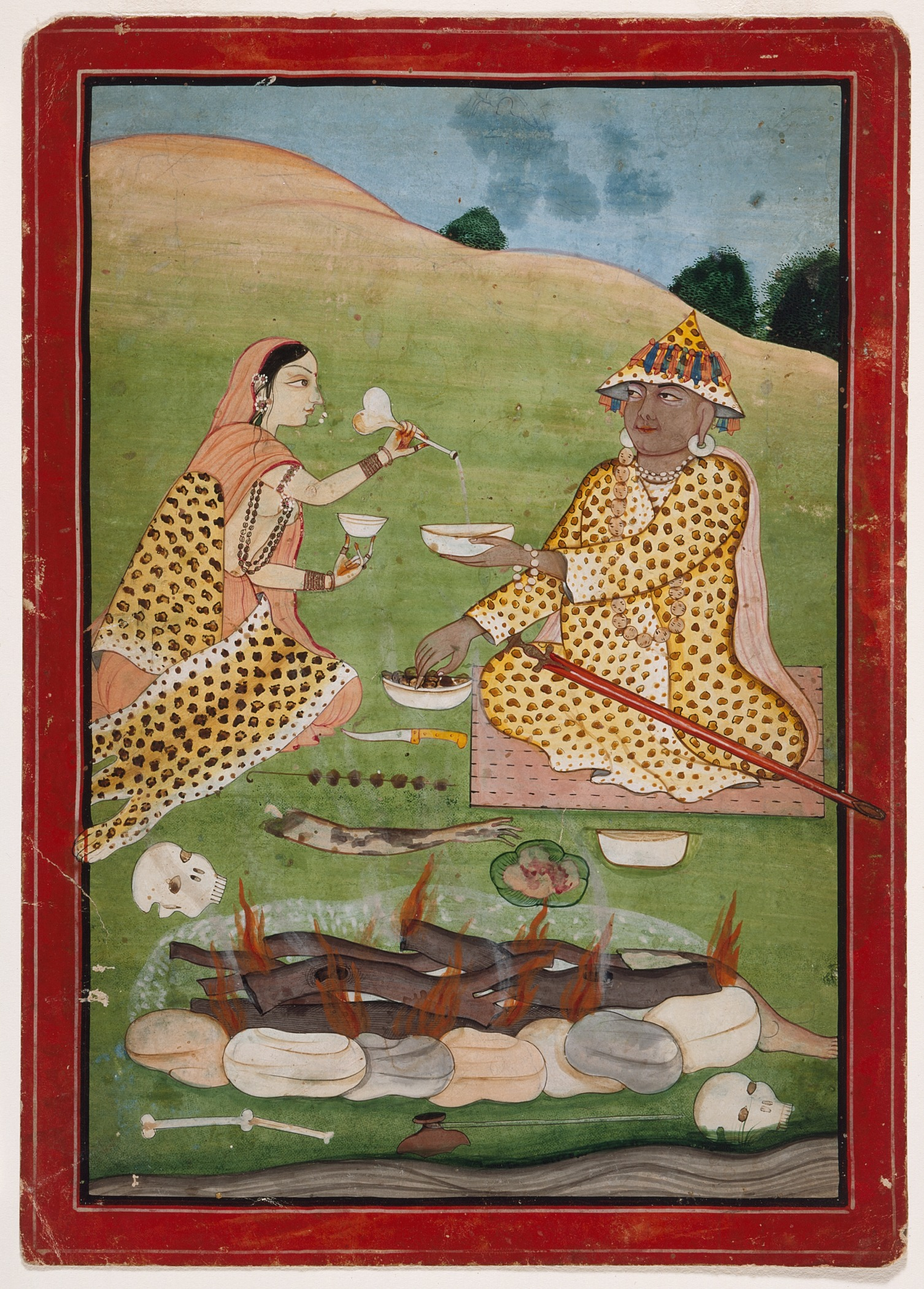
Ganachakra, Nurpur, Himachal Pradesh, India, c. 1790

A ganacakra (Sanskrit: गणचक्र gaṇacakra "gathering circle"; Tibetan: ཚོགས་ཀྱི་འཁོར་ལོ།, Wylie: tshogs kyi 'khor lo) is also known as tsok, ganapuja, cakrapuja or ganacakrapuja. It is a generic term for various tantric assemblies or feasts, in which practitioners meet to chant mantra, enact mudra, make votive offerings and practice various tantric rituals as part of a sādhanā, or spiritual practice. The ganachakra often comprises a sacramental meal and festivities such as dancing, spirit possession, and trance; the feast generally consisting of materials that were considered forbidden or taboo in medieval India like meat, fish, and wine. As a tantric practice, forms of gaṇacakra are practiced today in Hinduism, Bön and Vajrayāna Buddhism.

== Ritual ==
Professor Miranda Shaw summarised the experience of a gaṇacakra:

The feast is an esoteric ritual that unfolds in many stages. The sacred space for the ceremony is demarcated by geometric designs drawn on the ground with powdered pigments, and an elaborate array of offerings and foods are laid out. The participants don special insignia like bone ornaments and crowns and use musical instruments of archaic design... for inducing heightened awareness. Practitioners sit in a circle and partake of sacramental (dry) meat and wine (often liquor) served in skull-cups. The feasts also provide an occasion for the exchange of ritual lore, the ritual worship of women (sripuja), and the performance of sexual yogas. The feast culminates in the performance of tantric dances and music that must never be disclosed to outsiders. The revelers may also improvise "songs of realization" (caryagiti) to express their heightened clarity and blissful raptures in spontaneous verse.

Professor Geoffrey Samuel held that:

[S]erious Tantric practice is generally seen as appropriate for a small minority only. The ancient Indian gaṇacakra, the circle ritual...discussed earlier, is far in the past. In Tibetan practice it has long been replaced by the gaṇapuja (Tibetan: tshogs), a considerably tamer affair, still involving a sacramental meal but normally performed indoors and without possession or dancing.

== Origins ==
John Woodroffe (writing as Arthur Avalon, 1918) affirms that the panchamrita of Tantra, Hindu and Buddhist traditions are directly related to the Mahābhūta or Five Elements and that the panchamakara is actually a vulgar term for the pañcatattva:

Worship with the Pañcatattva generally takes place in a Cakra or circle composed of men and women, Sadhakas and Sadhikas, Bhairavas and Bhairavis sitting in a circle, the Shakti being on the Sadhaka's left. Hence it is called Cakrapuja. A Lord of the Cakra (Cakreshvara) presides sitting with his Shakti in the center. During the Cakra, there is no distinction of caste, but Pashus of any caste are excluded. There are various kinds of Cakra—productive, it is said, of differing fruits for the participator therein. As amongst Tantrik Sadhakas we come across the high, the low, and mere pretenders, so the Cakras vary in their characteristics from say the Tattva-cakra for the Brahma-kaulas, and the Bhairavi-cakra (as described in Mahanirvana, VII. 153) in which, in lieu of wine, the householder takes milk, sugar and honey (Madhura-traya), and in lieu of sexual union does meditation upon the Lotus Feet of the Divine Mother with Mantra, to Cakras the ritual of which will not be approved such as Cudacakra, Anandabhuvana-yoga and others referred to later.

== Sacred space ==
The ganachakra, or 'tantric feast', can be seen as a mandala of sacred space. Pettit emphasises the importance of the gathered "group" (gana) or sangha to Vajrayana sādhanā and the creation of sacred space such as the ganachakra:

The power of sacred bonding in a temporary or virtual sacred space is an intrinsic, if normally invisible, component of a Vajrayana community experience. The community is that experience, and ceases to exist without it. To dwell in that sacredness requires not only that one perceive it, but to maintain that perception requires discipline, faith and a profound sense of love and respect for members of the mandala – that is, all living beings.

Pettit links the importance of the group or gana to the manifestation of the ganachakra and the sacred space or the mandala (in this sense cognate with chakra) with the liturgical tools of mantra, visualisation and sacred architecture:

The potential for sacred space to manifest spontaneously is nowhere higher than in Vajrayana Buddhist practice, which employs the use of mantra and visualization to create an experience of sacredness. Through liturgical performances, or amidst the activities of everyday life, a yogi is to experience, imaginately imaginatively or better yet spontaneously, the presence of divinity – Buddhahood embodied – in his or her own person, companions and environment. These constitute a mandala or sacred architecture which expresses the omnipresence of enlightenment, that is the ground of both "secular" and "sacred" experiences and activities that are never perceived apart from its all-encompassing confines. The invocation of divine presence of mandala is especially effective when undertaken by several people in a ritual context, and it is incumbent for practitioners to do so periodically with a feast-offering known as tsok or, in Sanskrit, ganapuja.

Pettit states that sacred space is created spontaneously wherever the Three Jewels (cognate with the gankyil) is manifest and that this sacred architecture or mandala is not dependent upon the built environment of monolithic cultures:

Sacred Space is created spontaneously wherever the Three Jewels – the Buddha or teacher, the Dharma teaching or its texts, and the Sangha community of practitioners – are found. A place that elicits reverence should be sacred, and wherever the Jewels are found, the pieties of lay and ordained Buddhists are bound to be expressed.

== In Hindu tantra ==
In Hindu tantra, a ganachakra typically consists of five elements known as panchamakara or the "five Ms". These are madya (alcohol), māṃsa (meat), matsya (fish), mudrā (grain), and maithuna (sexual intercourse). Taboo-breaking elements are only practiced literally by "left-hand path" tantrics (vāmācārins) such as the Aghori monastic order, whereas "right-hand path" tantrics (dakṣiṇācārins) oppose these.

In the Vamachara tradition, adherents engage in literal consumption and use of the Five Ms, along with other ritual elements such as incense, music, and costumes. This approach represents a more overt embrace of these elements to attain spiritual transformation. In contrast, Dakṣiṇācāra practitioners interpret the Five Ms symbolically and metaphorically, emphasizing their spiritual significance and using them as symbols for meditation and inner transformation. This interpretation encourages practitioners to transcend their worldly desires gradually and embrace subtle Tantric practices.

== In Buddhist tantra ==
=== Connection with the Mahasiddhas ===
Samuel defines the ganachakra succinctly:

Vajrayāna or Tantric Buddhism had its origin in India, where it seems to have been practised, at any rate in its earlier period, say the fourth to eighth centuries CE, by small initiatory cult groups. The central ritual of these groups was the gaṇacakra, a night-time sacramental circle, usually outdoors, often in a cremation ground or similarly spooky and 'powerful' location, with distinctly antinomian elements. These included the ritual use of sexuality, although it is not clear how far this was performed literally and how far symbolically. The gaṇacakra involved possession, dancing and singing, and also magical procedures. It was seen as an occasion to enter a non-ordinary state of consciousness.

Vajranatha associates the ganachakra with the higher tantras, the anuttarayogatantra, and associates a non-monastic origin and tributary of this rite to the Mahasiddha tradition which has roots in a complex and coterie of esoteric traditions of numerous siddha and sadhu Buddhist, Hindu and non-sectarian practices and views:

The Higher Tantras could not be a congregational practice of monks because Tantric sadhana, as well as celebrations of the High Tantric feast or Ganachakrapuja, required partaking of meat, wine, and sexual intercourse. At the very least the latter two would force a monk to break his vows. And so what came about in the eleventh century was a change in the external style of practice; the Anuttara Tantras, many of them freshly brought from India and newly translated into Tibetan, came to be practiced in the style of the lower Yoga Tantras. Although there is a great deal of ritual in the Yoga Tantras, there is nothing there that would require a monk to violate his monastic vows. The presence of a woman or Dakini is required at High Tantric initiation and also at the Tantric feast of the Ganachakrapuja, but in the eleventh century reform the actual Dakini physically present was replaced by a mind-consort (yid kyi rig-ma), a visualization of the Dakini. One did the sexual practice only in visualization, not in actuality. In this way the practices of the Higher Tantras could be taken into the monasteries and incorporated into the congregations practice and liturgy of the monks known as puja.

=== In Tibetan Buddhism ===
In Tibetan Buddhism, it is traditional to offer a tsok (Tib. for ganachakra) to Padmasambhava or other deities, usually gurus, on the tenth lunar day, and to a form of dakini such as Yeshe Tsogyal, Mandarava or Vajrayogini on the twenty-fifth lunar day. Generally, participants are required by their samaya (bond or vow) to partake of meat and alcohol, and the rite tends to have elements symbolic of coitus. Traditions of the Ganachakra liturgy and rite extends remains of food and other compassionate offerings to alleviate the insatiable hunger of the hungry ghosts, genius loci and other entities.

David Snellgrove (1987) holds that there is a tendency oft-promoted by Tibetan lamas who disseminate teachings in the Western world, to treat references to sexual union and to sadhana that engages with the "five impure substances" (usually referred to as the "five nectars") as symbolic. In the twilight language of correspondences and substitutions there is no inconsistency. Although, when modern tantric apologists and scholars employ the term "symbolic" as though no external practices were engaged in literally, they mislead and perpetuate an untruth.

In the Tibetan Buddhist practice of Chöd, a variation of the gaṇacakra has the practitioner visualizing offering their own body as a feast for all beings who are all invited to the feast.

== See also ==
- Proto-Indo-Iranian religion
- Sukuh
- Vaishnava-Sahajiya
