= Hieros gamos =

Divine marriage

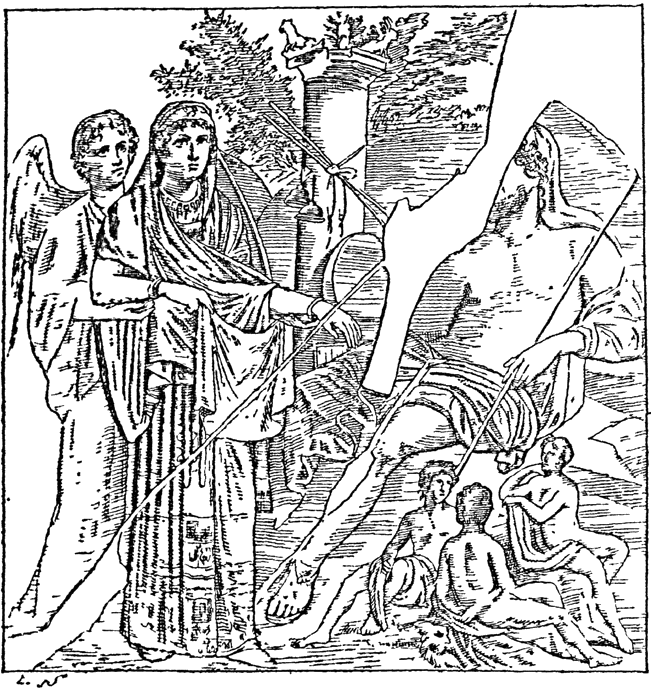
Hieros gamos of Hera (shown with Iris) and Zeus, 1900 drawing of a fresco at Pompeii.

Hieros gamos, (from Ancient Greek: ἱερός, romanized: hieros, lit. 'holy, sacred' and γάμος gamos 'marriage') or hierogamy (Ancient Greek: ἱερὸς γάμος, ἱερογαμία 'holy marriage') is a sacred marriage that takes place between gods, especially when enacted in a symbolic ritual where human participants represent the deities.

The notion of hieros gamos does not always presuppose literal sexual intercourse in ritual, but is also used in purely symbolic or mythological contexts, notably in alchemy and hence in Jungian psychology. Hieros gamos is described as the prototype of fertility rituals.

== Ancient Near East ==
Sacred sexual intercourse is thought to have been common in the Ancient Near East as a form of "Sacred Marriage" or hieros gamos between the kings of a Sumerian city-state and the High Priestesses of Inanna, the Sumerian goddess of love, fertility and warfare. Along the Tigris and Euphrates rivers there were many shrines and temples dedicated to Inanna. The temple of Eanna, meaning "house of heaven" in Uruk was the greatest of these. The temple housed Nadītu, priestesses of the goddess. The high priestess would choose for her bed a young man who represented the shepherd Dumuzid, consort of Inanna, in a hieros gamos celebrated during the annual Duku ceremony, just before Invisible Moon, with the autumn Equinox (Autumnal Zag-mu Festival).

== Greek mythology ==
In Greek mythology, the classic instance is the wedding of Zeus and Hera celebrated at the Heraion of Samos, along with its architectural and cultural predecessors. Some scholars would restrict the term to reenactments, but most accept its extension to real or simulated union in the promotion of fertility: such an ancient union of Demeter with Iasion, enacted in a thrice-ploughed furrow, a primitive aspect of a sexually-active Demeter reported by Hesiod, occurred in Crete, origin of much early Greek myth. In actual cultus, Walter Burkert found the Greek evidence "scanty and unclear": "To what extent such a sacred marriage was not just a way of viewing nature, but an act expressed or hinted at in ritual is difficult to say". The best-known ritual example surviving in classical Greece is the hieros gamos enacted at the Anthesteria by the wife of the Archon basileus, the "Archon King" in Athens, originally therefore the queen of Athens, with Dionysus, presumably represented by his priest or the basileus himself, in the Boukoleion in the Agora.

The brief fertilizing mystical union engenders Dionysus, and doubled unions, of a god and of a mortal man on one night, result, through telegony, in the semi-divine nature of Greek heroes such as Theseus (per his and Dionysus' relationships with Ariadne).

== Tantric Buddhism ==
In Tantric Buddhism of Nepal, Bhutan, India and Tibet, yab-yum is a ritual of the male deity in union with a female deity as his consort. The symbolism is associated with Anuttarayoga tantra where the male figure is usually linked to compassion (karuṇā) and skillful means (upāya-kauśalya), and the female partner to 'insight' or 'wisdom' (prajñā). Yab-yum is generally understood to represent the primordial (or mystical) union of wisdom and compassion.

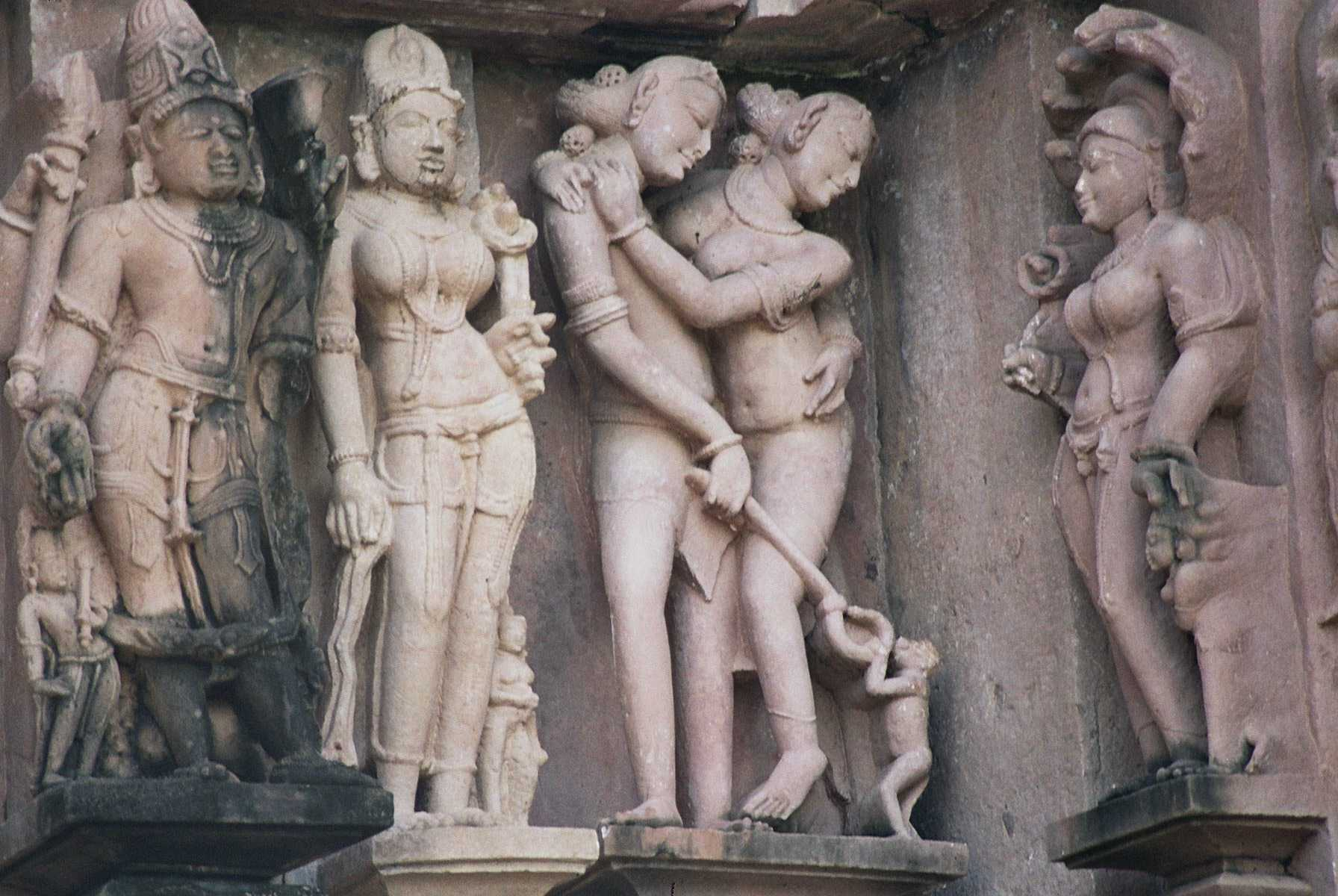
Maithuna at Khajuraho

Maithuna is a Sanskrit term used in Tantra most often translated as sexual union in a ritual context. It is the most important of the five Panchamakara and constitutes the main part of the Grand Ritual of Tantra variously known as Panchamakara, Panchatattva, and Tattva Chakra.

The symbolism of union and polarity is a central teaching in Tantric Buddhism, especially in Tibet. The union is realized by the practitioner as a mystical experience within one's own body.

== Alchemy and Jungian psychology ==
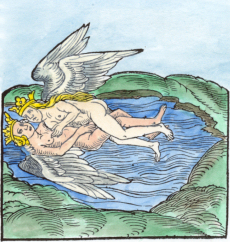
Depiction of the fermentatio stage as hieros gamos, woodcut from the 16th century Rosary of the Philosophers.

The hieros gamos is one of the themes that Carl Jung dealt with in his book Symbols of Transformation.

== Wicca ==
In Wicca, the Great Rite is a ritual based on the Hieros Gamos. It is generally enacted symbolically by a dagger (known as an athame) being placed point first into a chalice, the action symbolizing the union of the male and female divine. In British Traditional Wicca, the Great Rite is sometimes carried out in actuality by the High Priest and High Priestess.

== See also ==
- Maithuna
- Spirit spouse
- Sacred prostitution
- Sex magic
- Sovereignty goddess
- Tantra
- Fertility rites
- Ardhanarishvara
