= Vaishnava Sahajiya =

Hindu Tantric tradition

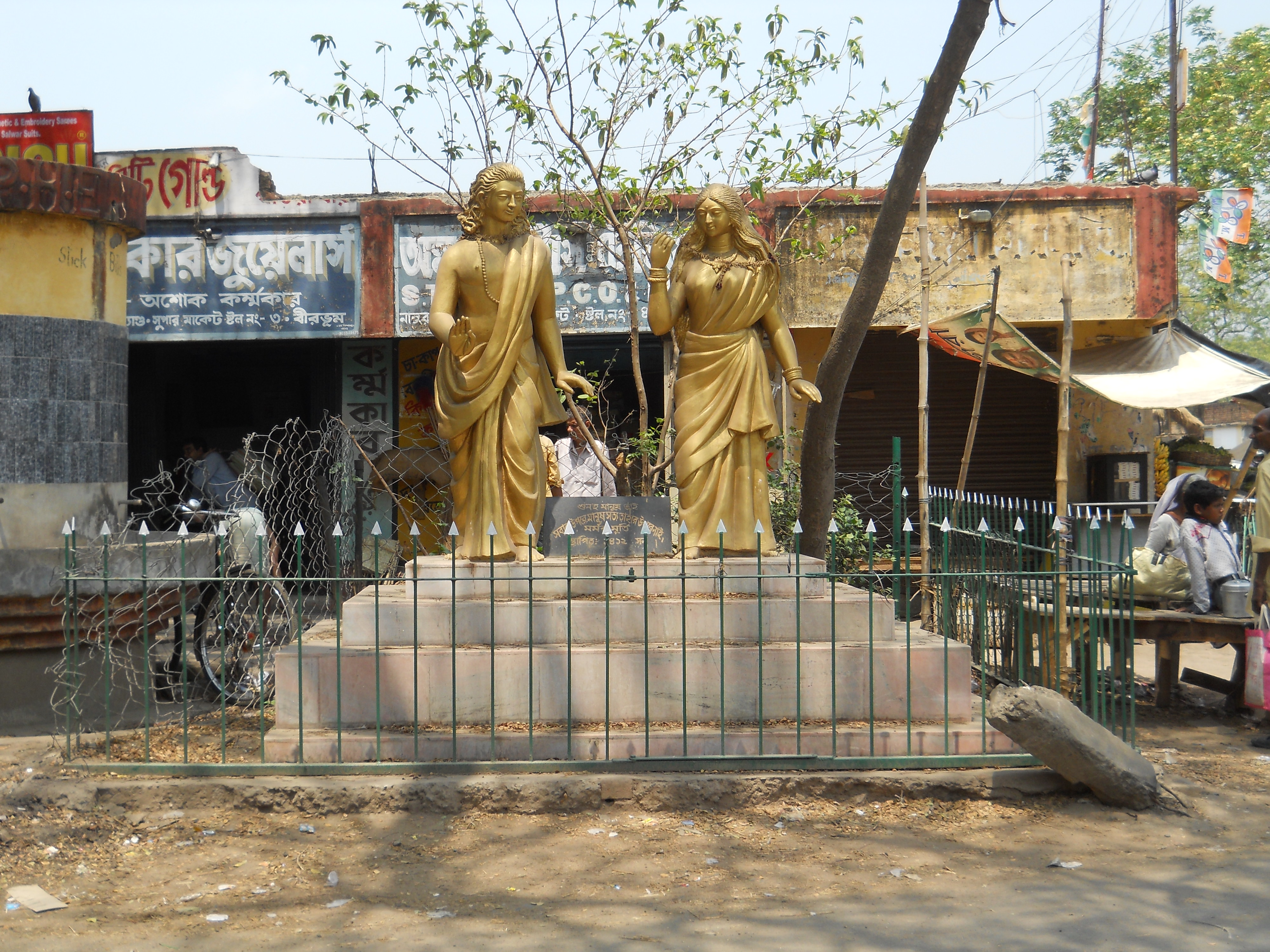
Statue of Vaiṣṇava Sahajiyā poet Chandidas and his lover Rajakini, at his birthplace of Nanoor

Vaiṣṇava Sahajiyā was a form of Hindu tantric Vaishnavism focused on Radha Krishna worship that specifically developed in Bengal. This tradition flourished from the 16th to the 19th century. Oral tradition has it that this sect originated from the last surviving followers of Vajrayana (numbering around 1200 men & 1300 women) who converted to Gaudiya Vaishnavism as a result of the preaching of Virachandra (aka Virabhadra) Goswami, the son of Chaitanya Mahaprabhu's associate Nityananda, following the decline of Buddhism due to the Islamic conquest of Bengal. The Vaiṣṇava Sahajiyā tradition produced many great poets who wrote in the Bengali language, the most famous of these poets all wrote under the pen name Chandidas (a name used by various authors). Their religious literature was mainly written in Bengali vernacular.

Vaiṣṇava Sahajiyā used the romance between Krishna and Radha (defined as parakiya rasa as by Visvanatha Chakravarti) as a metaphor for union with the innate or primordial condition (the Sahaja) present in everyone. They sought to experience that union through its physical reenactment in tantric ritual. To this end, Vaiṣṇava Sahajiyā often made use of sexual intercourse in their tantric sadhanas. Vaiṣṇava Sahajiyās understood Krishna as being the inner cosmic form (svarupa) of every man and likewise Radha was seen as the inner form of women.

The Vaiṣṇava Sahajiyā tradition was deeply influenced by Bhakti movement and its poets (such as Jayadeva). They were also deeply influenced by the Vajrayana idea known as "Sahaja" and made use of tantric sexuality (karmamudra). From the Bengali Vaishnavas, Vaiṣṇava Sahajiyā adopted the devotion to Radha Krishna and its understanding of bhava (feeling) and rasa (flavor). From the Buddhists, they adopted the theory of emptiness (shunyata) and tantric deity yoga and sexuality.

The Vaiṣṇava Sahajiyā tradition also influenced the Baul tradition of Bengal. The Vaiṣṇava Sahajiyā tradition does not survive as a living lineage today with an unbroken connection to the medieval gurus. However, its influences can be found in some modern Bengal Hindu tantrikas who claim to be Sahajiyās.

== Teachings ==
Vaiṣṇava Sahajiyā synthesized Vajrayana with Gaudiya Vaishnavism. Vaiṣṇava Sahajiyās held that the erotic (sringara) flavor of devotion was the superior rasa of divine love. As such, a central practice in their tradition was sexual yoga, which they held re-enacted the divine love between Radha and Krishna and allowed them to taste the flavor (rasa) of the divine love through their own personal experience. This is possible because all men and women are incarnations of God. Sexual sadhana was said to be able to transform desire (kama) into pure divine love (prema).

According to Glen A. Hayes, Vaiṣṇava Sahajiyā was influenced by the tantric traditions which focused on psycho-physical yoga and emphasized "the correspondence between the human body as a microcosm (miniature universe) and the universe as a macrocosm (large universe)." Since they held that the human body was connected with the larger universe in a divine manner, one could control the bodies energies (including sexual energies) and through this one could access divine cosmic forces and attain the highest reality.

The whole process of sexual yoga was held to be difficult and to require years of preparatory practices which included meditation, breathing exercises, and chanting all of which culminated in the practice of tantric sex (sambhoga). In this sexual rite, the man was not supposed to ejaculate, but instead he must absorb the mixed sexual fluids into his body and move them up the central mystical channel (nadi). Through the practice of sambhoga, it was held that the couple could "return to the unity of the together-born state of sahaja - the absolute state prior to and beyond creation." While the system of Gaudiya Vaishnavism is strictly theistic, seeing god as a supreme person, the Vaiṣṇava Sahajiyās saw Krishna as the true form (svarupa) which dwells inside all males (and Radha was likewise in all women). Thus, in Vaiṣṇava Sahajiyā, Krishna and Radha are cosmic forces that are embodied in all beings. As such, Vaiṣṇava Sahajiyā was a monistic system.

The Vaiṣṇava Sahajiyā tradition included numerous female gurus, in contrast to many other Hindu tantric traditions. They also held that liberation could not be achieved without cooperating with a member of the opposite sex.

While physical sexual sadhana was an important element of Vaiṣṇava Sahajiyā, it was not the only practice and worship of the deity and guru were also central to Vaiṣṇava Sahajiyā yoga. Vaiṣṇava Sahajiyā yoga could be practiced individually (through visualizing the deity and other yogic practices) as well as with a partner. Furthermore, the Sahajiyās also made use of classic bhakti practices such as kirtan and chanting the names of Krishna as a way to intensify their feelings of love and devotion for Krishna.

Vaiṣṇava Sahajiyās believed that Gaudiya Vaiṣṇava masters like Chaitanya and Jayadeva had practiced sexual sahaja sadhana. They also believed that the Buddha himself had also practiced this tantric method with his consort Gopa.

Vaiṣṇava Sahajiyās believed that human beings were a microcosm of the whole universe. As such, men and women are personifications of the supreme being (Brahman). As such as our divinity is naturally innate (the literal meaning of 'sahaja'). For the Vaiṣṇava Sahajiyās, the greatest quality of this natural divinity is pure love (prema) and their religion focused on awakening and supporting this innate divine love.

According to the Vaiṣṇava Sahajiyā text entitled Ratnasara:

All lives are created as a result of the union of the male and female elements, and so are human beings also. Under a favorable opportunity, God comes in the human body with all His natural characteristics, and the new form is nothing but a modified image of God...However transformed man may be by virtue of his birth, the divine element in him cannot remain concealed, and those who manifest this divine character to its fullest extent are called...by the term Sahaja.

The Vaiṣṇava Sahajiyās believed that God's love manifested as the whole universe, which includes our very bodies as well love (prema) and lust (kama). For the Vaiṣṇava Sahajiyās, Krishna was associated with consciousness or the purusha while Radha was associated with prakriti or the material world. In Vaiṣṇava Sahajiyā, the interactions between consciousness and matter is the play (lila) of God.

Vaiṣṇava Sahajiyā practices also often involved breaking social norms, including those relating to caste. Because of their antinomian and erotic methods (which were viewed with suspicion by many), the Vaiṣṇava Sahajiyās operated in secrecy. In their literature they adopted a cryptic tantric language known as "intentional language" (Sanskrit: saṃdhyā-bhāṣā). For example, semen could be referred to with the term "rasa" (which can mean juice, like sugarcane juice).

There are also right-handed and left-handed Vaiṣṇava Sahajiyās: dakṣiṇācāra may be rendered into English as "right (dakshina) ritual (chara)", while vāmācāra may be rendered into English as "left (vama) ritual (chara)". The dakshinacharyas ("right practitioners") are the ones that practice the panchamakara ('Five Ms') symbolically or through substitutions, whilst the vāmācāras ("left practitioners") are the ones that practice it literally (using meat, fish etc.)

== Poetry ==
Poem-songs (padavalis) were very important to the Vaiṣṇava Sahajiyā tradition. Most of these poems deal with devotion, yoga, meditation, mystical experience and divine love. These poems would often be sung to music.

The most famous poet of the Vaiṣṇava Sahajiyās was Chandidas (Caṇḍidāsa). Other key figures include Vidyāpati, Caitanya-dāsa, Rupa, Sanatana, Vrndavana Dasa (author of Chaitanya Bhagavata), Krishnadasa Kaviraja, Narahari Sarkar, and Mukundadasa.

=== Poems attributed to "Caṇḍidāsa" ===
Chandidas or Caṇḍidāsa (Bengali: চন্ডীদাস; born 1408 CE, whose name means "servant of the furious goddess") refers to possibly more than one medieval poet of Bengal. Over 1250 poems related to the love of Radha and Krishna in Bengali with the signature line (bhanita) of a "Chandidas" have survived. These are attributed to "Chandidas", which may appear alone or along with three different other sobriquets: Baḍu, Dvija and Dina. But it is likely that these poems were written by numerous hands who then attributed the poems to the widespread Sahajiyā pen name "Chandidas".

One such poem attributed to Chandidas is the following, which speaks of the inner person (i.e. Krishna):

Everyone is talking about the inner person (manusa), the inner person;
But what kind of being is the inner person?
The inner person is a jewel. The inner person is life itself.
The inner person is the treasure of the vital breaths (prana).
All the world's people are deluded by errors and confusion.
They do not understand the true inner meaning (marma) of life.
The divine love (prema) of the inner person does not usually appear in the earthly realm,
but only through the inner person can people experience divine love.
Those people who experience the inner person are the inner person,
because the inner person recognizes the inner person.
These people and the inner person seem to exist separately,
yet it is the inner person who realizes the inner person.
Those who experience the inner person are dead-yet-alive.
They have become the very essence of that inner person.
Initial experiences of the inner person are signs of great good fortune.
The inner person is on the far shores of experience.
Chanting the name of the inner person leads to a separate mystical place.
Distinct from this world, it has its own customs.
Chandidasa says: Everything about it is distinct.
Who can fathom its customs?

Another poem speaks in cryptic language about sexual yoga ("rasa" refers to sexual fluids, "whirlpool" and "churning" refers to the movements of sex):

The mystic was born in the sea of divine juice (rasa).
To whom will I speak about that divine juice?
By whom and where was it cultivated? Who tasted it?
Who is able to speak about it?
The essence of the nectar of immortality (amiya) is named "divine juice."
The divine juice flows in three streams.
The experience of divine juice is eternally renewed.
Who has the power to understand this?
The treasure trove of nectar is churned without stopping.
Divine juice is produced by that churning.
That woman who is called "faithful to her husband" (pativrata) is devoted to the nectar.
Through the motions of her husband, divine juice is made.
The sweetness of divine juice overwhelms everything.
Who has the power to understand this?
This divine juice is very rare, the most extraordinary thing of all.
Within it is the inner person (manuqa) who controls reality.
Chandidasa says: Most difficult to obtain indeed is the divine juice of the inner person.
In mere conversation about it, suffering and fear are destroyed.
Among everything, it is the juiciest of all.

=== Vidyāpati ===
A sahajiya poem of attributed to the Maithili poet Vidyāpati (1352? - 1448?) is rendered into English by David R. Kinsley (1975: p. 48-49) thus:

As I near the bed, he smiles and gazes.
Flower-arrows fill the world.
The sport of love, its glow and luxuries are indescribable, O friend,
And when I yield myself, his joy is endless.
Freeing my skirt, he snatches at my garland.
My downcast mind Is freed of frontiers,
Though my life is held in the net of his love.
He drinks my lips.
With heart so thrilled, he take my clothes away.
I lose my body at his touch and long to check
But grant his love.
Says Vidyāpati: Sweet as honey is the talk of a girl in love.

=== Siddha Mukundadeva ===
Along with short poems, longer Esoteric Manuals were also written. The most important of these were those of Siddha Mukundadeva ("The Perfected Divine one who Gives Liberation", c. 1600-1650). He composed a major work entitled "The Collection of Liberating Statements of Mukunda" (Mukunda muktavali) in Sanskrit. This was later translated into Bengali.

The Necklace of Immortality is another key work of Mukundadeva or Mukundadasa. The text described the path of the Vaiṣṇava Sahajiyā tradition.

The Necklace of Immortality describes the initial steps of the path as beginning with finding a mantric guru:

13) Divine Love for Krishna is always pure, it is never stained. Get rid of the Vedas and never perform any Vedic rituals! 14) The first step on the path is to seek refuge at the place of the mantra guru. Ordinary physical birth is from a womb, but this only results in old age and hell! 15) When you are accepted by the guru you will be sheltered by the power of the mantra. Keep the instructions of the guru close to your heart. 16) With great care, the guru who has initiated you with the mantra will guide your practices. You must continue to follow these instructions for as long as you practice. 17) One of those commands is that you associate with a special community of practitioners. Through following such instructions, you will reach the state of consciousness of the Divine Existence.

The Necklace then describes how the body is transformed through sexual sadhana:

27) A Divine Body (devadeha) must be born within the physical body. So how many men and women come to know that they possess a Divine Body? 28) With effort, you will discover the Divine Body within the physical body... 29) By performing ritual practices with a woman, the Divine Body will be discovered within the physical body. A woman who has realized her divine inner nature should server as the passionate Female Partner. 34) The blessed Inner Damsel Body leads the adept to the Vraja heaven. With her body of eternity, she helps the adept to master the passions. 35) Without her, you'll never taste the passion-filled Cosmic Substances of the Vraja heaven. For adepts seeking Vraja, she is the very essence of the way of passion. 37) The Female Partner who is imbued with Divine Love shimmers with erotic energies, and is herself a well of Divine Essence. Having a splendid body like Radha, she is the well of both Divine Essence and Cosmic Substance.

== Manuscripts ==
Shashibhusan Dasgupta (1946, 1962: p. 131) holds that there are two hundred and fifty "manuscripts of small texts" in the Calcutta University which are associated with the Sahajiya, and that there is a comparable number of manuscripts held in common with Calcutta University in the library of the Bangīya-sāhitya-pariṣad. Wendy Doniger (1989: p.xxii) in the Forward to Dimock (1989) affirms that The Asiatic Society in Calcutta holds a large collection of manuscripts and also states that "...the number of manuscripts in private libraries is indefinite but almost certainly huge."

== Criticism and opposition ==
Due to their religious use of sexual intercourse, Vaiṣṇava Sahajiyā was seen as scandalous and controversial by many in the Bengali community, who were quite conservative when it came to sexuality and caste. From the point of view of the more orthodox Gaudiya Vaishnava tradition, Vaiṣṇava Sahajiyā is generally considered a heterodox apostate path (asampradaya) as well as a left-hand path ('vāmācāra'). The modern Vaisnava guru Bhaktisiddhanta Sarasvati strongly opposed the Sahajiya practice on the grounds that a soul cannot be promoted to the status of Radha or her expansions.

== See also ==
- Charyapada
- Maithuna
