= Left-hand path and right-hand path =

Dichotomy between two opposing approaches to magic

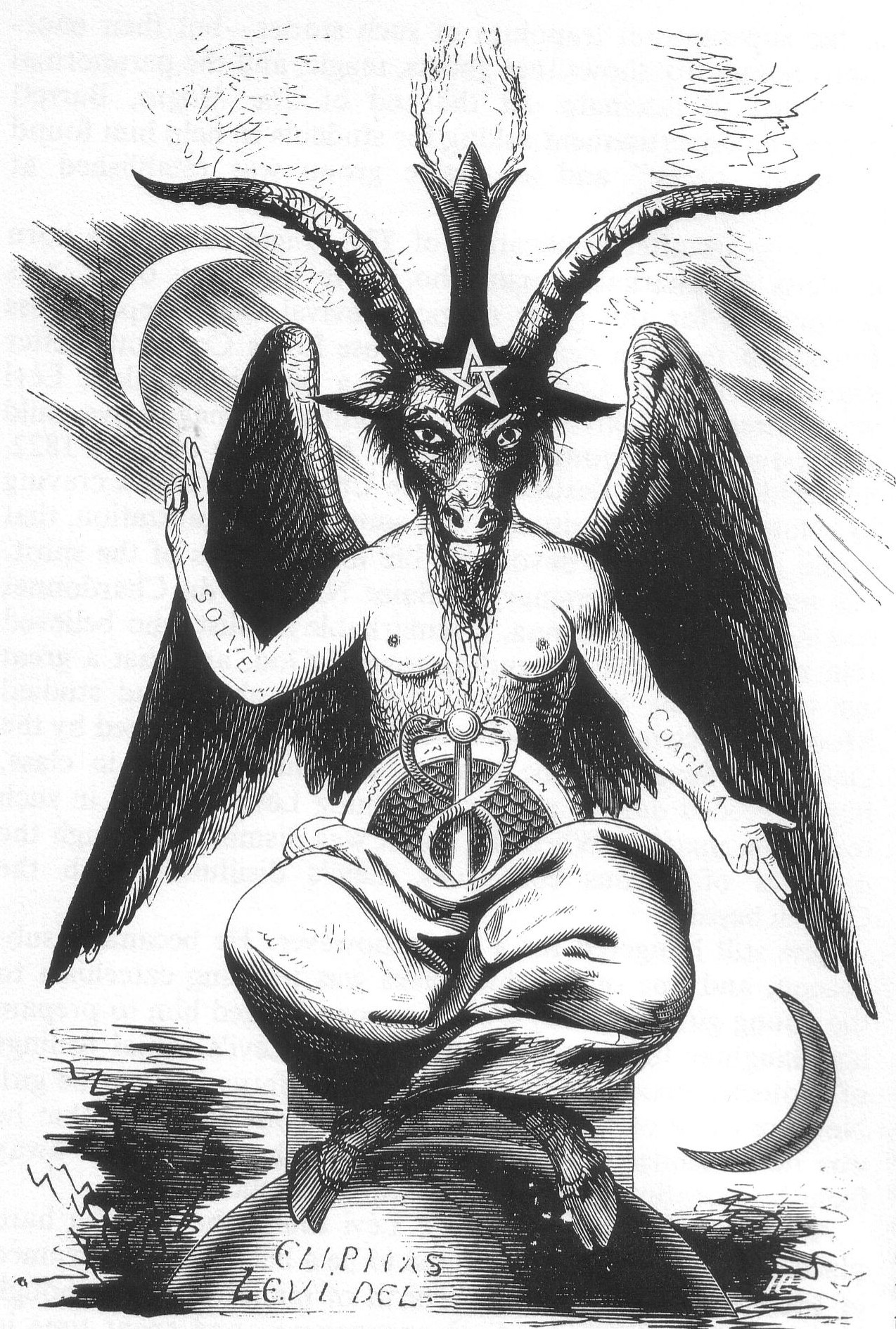
The figure of Baphomet, as depicted by Éliphas Lévi in Dogme et Rituel de la Haute Magie (1856), has been adopted as a symbol by adherents of left-hand path belief systems

In Western esotericism, left-hand path and right-hand path are two opposing approaches to magic. Various groups engaged with the occult and ceremonial magic use the terminology to establish a dichotomy, broadly simplified as (malicious) black magic on the left and (benevolent) white magic on the right. Others approach the left/right paths as different kinds of workings, without connotations of good or evil magical actions. Still others treat the paths as fundamental schemes, connected with external divinities on the right, contrasted with self-deification on the left.

The terms have their origins in tantra: the right-hand path (RHP, or dakṣiṇācāra) applied to magical or spiritual groups that follow specific ethical codes and adopt social convention, while the left-hand path (LHP, or vāmācāra) adopts the opposite attitude, breaking taboos and abandoning set morality in order to practice and embrace heterodox practices.

== Terminology ==
=== Right-hand path ===
The right-hand path is commonly thought to refer to magical or religious groups which adhere to a certain set of characteristics:

- They divide the concepts of mind, body and spirit into three separate, albeit interrelated, entities.
- They adhere to a specific moral code and a belief in some form of judgement, such as karma or the Threefold Law.

The occultist Dion Fortune considered Abrahamic religions to be RHP.

=== Left-hand path ===
Historian Dave Evans studied self-professed followers of the left-hand path in the early 21st century, making several observations about their practices:

- They often reject societal convention and the status quo, which some suggest is in a search for spiritual freedom. As a part of this, LHP followers embrace magical techniques that would traditionally be viewed as taboo, for instance using sex magic or embracing Satanic imagery. As Mogg Morgan wrote, the "breaking of taboos makes magic more potent and can lead to reintegration and liberation, [for example] the eating of meat in a vegetarian community can have the same liberating effect as anal intercourse in a sexually inhibited society".
- They often question religious or moral dogma, instead adhering to forms of personal anarchism.
- They often embrace sexuality and incorporate it into magical ritual such as in Tantra, long practiced in parts of both Europe and Asia.

== History of the terms ==
=== Tantra and Madame Blavatsky ===
Vāmācāra is a Sanskrit term meaning "left-handed attainment". The converse term is dakshinachara. The Western use of the terms left-hand path and right-hand path originated with Madame Blavatsky, a 19th-century occultist who founded the Theosophical Society. She had travelled across parts of southern Asia and gave accounts of having met with many mystics and magical practitioners in India and Tibet. She developed the term left-hand path as a translation of the term vamachara, an Indian Tantric practice that emphasised the breaking of Hindu societal taboos by having sexual intercourse in ritual, drinking alcohol, eating meat and assembling in graveyards, as a part of the spiritual practice. The term vamachara literally meant "the left-hand way" in Sanskrit, and it was from this that Blavatsky first coined the term.

Returning to Europe, Blavatsky began using the term. It was relatively easy for her to associate left with evil in many European countries, where it already has had an association with evil and bad luck since the Classical Latin era. As the historian Dave Evans noted, homosexuals were referred to as "left-handed", while in Protestant nations Roman Catholics were called "left-footers".

=== Adoption into the Western esoteric tradition ===
In New York, Madame Blavatsky founded the Theosophical Society with several other people in 1875. She set about writing several books, including Isis Unveiled (1877), in which she introduced the terms left-hand path and right-hand path, firmly stating that she herself followed the RHP, and that followers of the LHP were practitioners of black magic who were a threat to society. The occult community soon picked up on her newly introduced duality, which, according to historian Dave Evans, "had not been known before" in the Western Esoteric Tradition. For instance, Dion Fortune, founder of the magical group the Society of the Inner Light, also took the side of the RHP, making the claim that followers of the LHP were homosexuals and that Indian servants might use malicious magical rites devoted to the goddess Kali against their European masters.

Aleister Crowley further altered and popularized the term in certain occult circles, referring to a "brother of the left-hand path", or a "black brother", as one who failed to attain the grade of Magister Templi in Crowley's system of ceremonial magic. Crowley also referred to the left-hand path when describing the point at which the Adeptus Exemptus chooses to cross the Abyss, which is the location of Choronzon and the illusory eleventh Sephira, which is Da'ath or Knowledge. In this example, the adept must surrender all, including the guidance of his Holy Guardian Angel, and leap into the Abyss. If his accumulated karma is sufficient, and if he has been utterly thorough in his own self-destruction, he becomes a "babe of the abyss", arising as a Star in the Crowleyan system. On the other hand, if he retains some fragment of ego, or if he fears to cross, he then becomes encysted. The layers of his self, which he could have shed in the Abyss, ossify around him. He is then titled a "brother of the left-hand path", who will eventually be broken up and disintegrated against his will, since he failed to choose voluntary disintegration. Crowley associated all this with "Mary, a blasphemy against Babalon", and with the celibacy of Christian clergy.

A figure Fortune considered to be a follower of the LHP was Arthur Edward Waite, who did not recognise these terms, and acknowledged that they were newly introduced and that in any case he believed the terms LHP and RHP to be distinct from black and white magic. However, despite Waite's attempts to distinguish the two, the equation of the LHP with black magic was propagated more widely in the fiction of Dennis Wheatley; Wheatley also conflated the two with Satanism and also the political ideology of communism, which he viewed as a threat to traditional British society.

=== Later 20th and 21st centuries ===
In the latter half of the 20th century various groups arose that self-professedly described themselves as LHP but did not consider themselves as practicing black magic. In 1975, Kenneth Grant, a student of Aleister Crowley, explained in Cults of the Shadow that he and his group, the Typhonian Order, practiced the LHP. Grant's usage takes meaning from its roots in eastern Tantra; Grant states that it is about challenging taboos, but that it should be used in conjunction with the RHP to achieve balance.

== See also ==
- Theurgy – Magic used to invoke divine presence
- Goetia (magic) – Invocation of demons
- Pharmakos – Ancient Greek religious ritual
- Magic (supernatural)#High and low – Practice of supernatural beings and forces
- Magic in the Greco-Roman world#High and low magic
- Ceremonial magic – Variety of rituals of magic
- Aghori – Tantric Shaivite tradition and monastic order
- Apollonian and Dionysian – Philosophical and literary concepts
- Charnel ground – Above-ground location for disposal of the dead
- Chöd – Buddhist religious practice
- Kapalika – Medieval Tantric tradition of Shaivism
- Kaula – Religious tradition in Hinduism

== Bibliography ==
- Bhattacharyya, N. N. (1999). History of the Tantric Religion (2nd rev. ed.). Delhi: Manohar Publications. ISBN 81-7304-025-7.
- Carroll, Peter J. (1987). Liber Null & Psychonaut. Weiser Books. ISBN 978-1609255299.
- Crowley, Aleister (1991). Magick Without Tears. New Falcon Publications. ISBN 978-1-56184-018-2.
- Evans, Dave (2007). The History of British Magick after Crowley. Hidden Publishing.
- Gray, William (2004). Exorcising the Tree of Evil: How to Use the Symbolism of the Qabalistic Tree of Life to Recognise and Reverse Negative Energy. Kima Global Publishers. ISBN 978-0-9584493-1-1.
- Shual, Katon (2012). Sexual Magick: Secrets of Sexual Gnosis in Western Magick. Oxford: Mandrake of Oxford. ISBN 978-1906958480.
