= Panchamakara =

Five substances used in Tantric practice

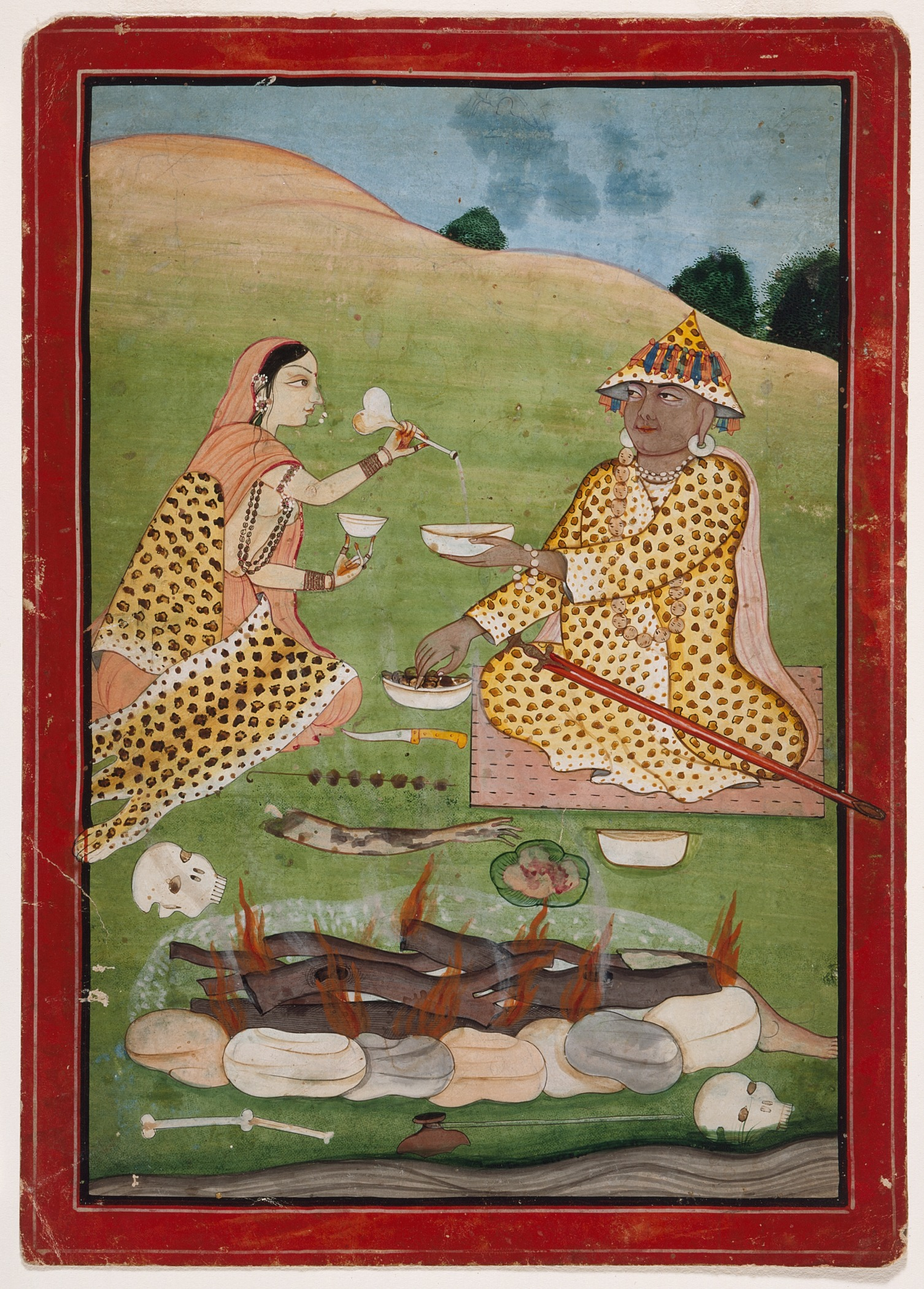
Ganachakra, Nurpur, Himachal Pradesh, India, c. 1790

Panchamakara or Panchatattva, or the Five Ms, is the Tantric term for the five substances used in a Tantric practice. These are madya (alcohol), māṃsa (meat), matsya (fish), mudrā (grain), and maithuna (sexual intercourse). Taboo-breaking elements are only practiced literally by "left-hand path" tantrics (vāmācārin-s), whereas "right-hand path" tantrics (dakṣiṇācārin-s) do not follow these.

In Kalyug, the practice of Panchamakar has been said to be the best, it is also called Kaul Marg, in the Vedic tradition, just as arguments are given by Vedas, Upanishads, Puranas, similarly in Tantra, we give the basis of the practice of Panchamakar to the book Mahanirvana Tantra Can (Mahanirvan Tantra). In the Vamachara tradition, adherents engage in literal consumption and use of the Five Ms, often in the context of ritual feasts (ganachakra), along with other ritual elements such as incense, music, and costumes. This approach represents a more overt embrace of these elements to attain spiritual transformation. In contrast, Dakṣiṇācāra practitioners interpret the Five Ms symbolically and metaphorically, emphasizing their spiritual significance and using them as symbols for meditation and inner transformation. This interpretation encourages practitioners to transcend their worldly desires gradually and embrace subtle Tantric practices.

== Symbolic meaning ==
In the introduction of his translation of the Mahanirvana Tantra, Sir John Woodroffe, under the pseudonym Arthur Avalon, describes the individual makara. He states that they include madya (wine), mamsa (meat), matsya (fish), mudra (grain), and maithuna (sexual intercourse). He describes both the symbolic and ritualistic significance of each element: madya represents a state of divine ecstasy, mamsa symbolizes the embrace of life's vitality, matsya signifies fluidity and adaptability in spirituality, mudra stands for sustenance on physical and spiritual levels, and maithuna represents the union of opposing forces for spiritual transformation. According to Woodroffe, these elements take on varying meanings depending on whether they are employed in Tamasika, Rajasika, or Sattvika sadhanas, reflecting different aspects of human existence and spirituality.

== Differences in interpretation ==
In Vamachara ("left hand path"), the "five Ms" are taken literally. Flowers, incense, perfumes, costumes, music, specially prepared food and drink, and Ayurvedic herbal preparations are considered important parts of the ritual feast (ganachakra) as well.

In Dakṣiṇācāra ("right hand path"), the "five Ms" are interpreted symbolically and metaphorically. According to Prabhat Ranjan Sarkar, the purpose of the Five M's is dual: for people to practice yoga sadhana (meditation) while in the "midst of crude enjoyments" and then gradually reduce the consumption of wine, meat, fish, and not to overindulge in sexual activities; and after learning to resist the allure of these activities, to engage in the subtle practices of Tantra meditation.

The five M's	Vamachara	Dakshinachara
Madya	Toddy	Amrita, divine nectar that drips from the glands in brain onto the tip of tongue and can be trapped using Khechari Mudra
Mamsa	Meat	Control of speech. It symbolizes the Khechari Mudra in which the tongue is swallowed back simulating eating meat.
Matsya	Fish	Ida and Pingala Nadis, controlled through pranayama. They are visualised as figure-of-8-shaped structures intertwining like two fish.
Mudra	Grain	Spiritual company, satsang; gestures the hands and body take when the Kundalini is activated and pass up through the central channel, the Sushumna Nadi.
Maithuna	Sexual intercourse, or female sexual discharge	Raising kundalini to the Sahasrara chakra.

== See also ==
- Karmamudrā – Vajrayana Buddhist practice
- Yab-Yum – Symbol in Tibetan Buddhist art
- Yogini § Panchamakara
