= Vamachara =

Sanskrit term for heterodox practices

Vāmācāra (Sanskrit: वामाचार, Sanskrit pronunciation: [ʋaːmaːtɕaːɽɐ]) is a tantric term meaning 'left-hand path' and is synonymous with the Sanskrit term vāmamārga. It is used to describe a particular mode of worship or sadhana (spiritual practice) that uses heterodox things to sublimate for spiritual growth.

These practices are often generally considered to be tantric in orientation. The converse term is dakṣiṇācāra "right-hand path", which is used to refer not only to orthodox sects but to modes of spirituality that engage in spiritual practices that accord with Vedic injunction and are generally agreeable to the status quo.

Left-handed and right-handed modes of practice may be evident in both orthodox and heterodox practices of Hinduism and are a matter of taste, culture, proclivity, initiation, sadhana and lineage (parampara).

== Nomenclature and etymology ==
N. N. Bhattacharyya explains the Sanskrit technical term Ācāra as follows:

[t]he means of spiritual attainment which varies from person to person according to competence.... Ācāras are generally of seven kinds -- Veda, Vaiṣṇava, Śaiva, Dakṣiṇa, Vāma, Siddhāṇta, and Kaula, falling into two broad categories -- Dakṣiṇa and Vāma. Interpretations vary regarding the nature and grouping of the ācāras. It is generally held that those who participate in the rituals of Five Ms belong to the category of Vāmācāra.

Vāma means "pleasant, lovable, agreeable" and dakṣiṇa means "south". Facing the rising sun towards east, dakṣiṇa would be the right side. For this reason, the term vāmācāra is often translated "left-hand path", while dakṣiṇamārga is translated as "right-hand path". An alternate etymology is that it is possible that the first word of the expression vāmācāra is not vāma or 'left', but vāmā or 'woman'. N. N. Bhattacharyya notes that a main feature of the tantras is respect for the status of women as a representation of Adi Shakti, and that if this was the original conception underlying vāmācāra, the opposing term dakṣiṇācara may have been a later development.

An alternate term vāmamārga ("left path") is also used. In this compound the ambiguity between vāma and vāmā is not present because the final -a is clearly short.

== In the Brahma Yamala ==
The Brahma Yamala, a right-handed Vaishnava tantric text, says there are three currents of tradition: dakshina, vama, and madhyama. These are characterized by the predominance of each of the three gunas: sattva, rajas, and tamas. According to this text, dakshina is characterized by sattva, and is pure; madhyama, characterized by rajas, is mixed; and vama, characterized by tamas, is impure. The tantras of each class follow a particular line of spiritual practice.

== Practices ==
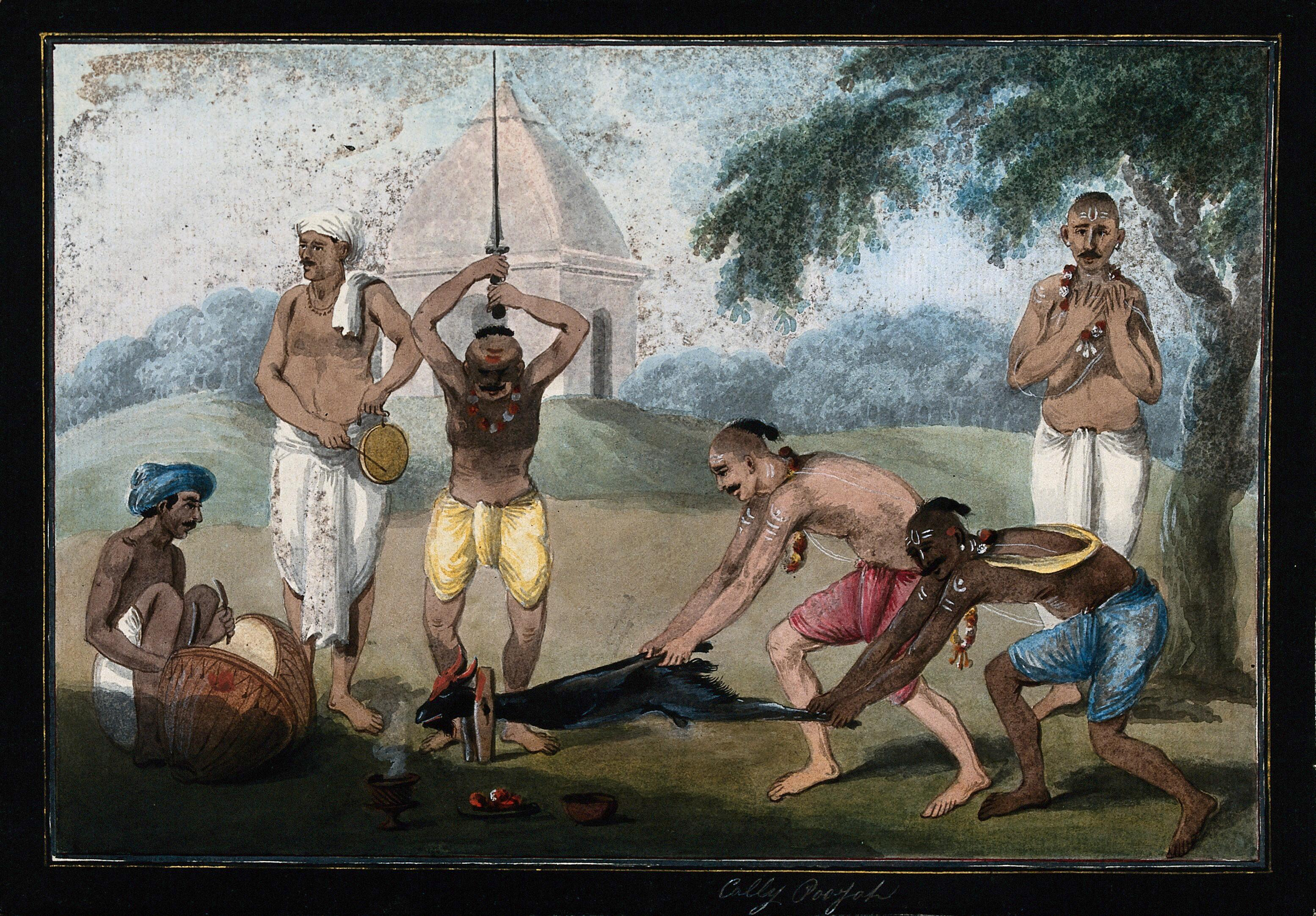
A goat being slaughtered at Kali Puja. Painting by an Indian artist dated between 1800 and 1899. Inscription on verso: "A Hindoo sacrifice"

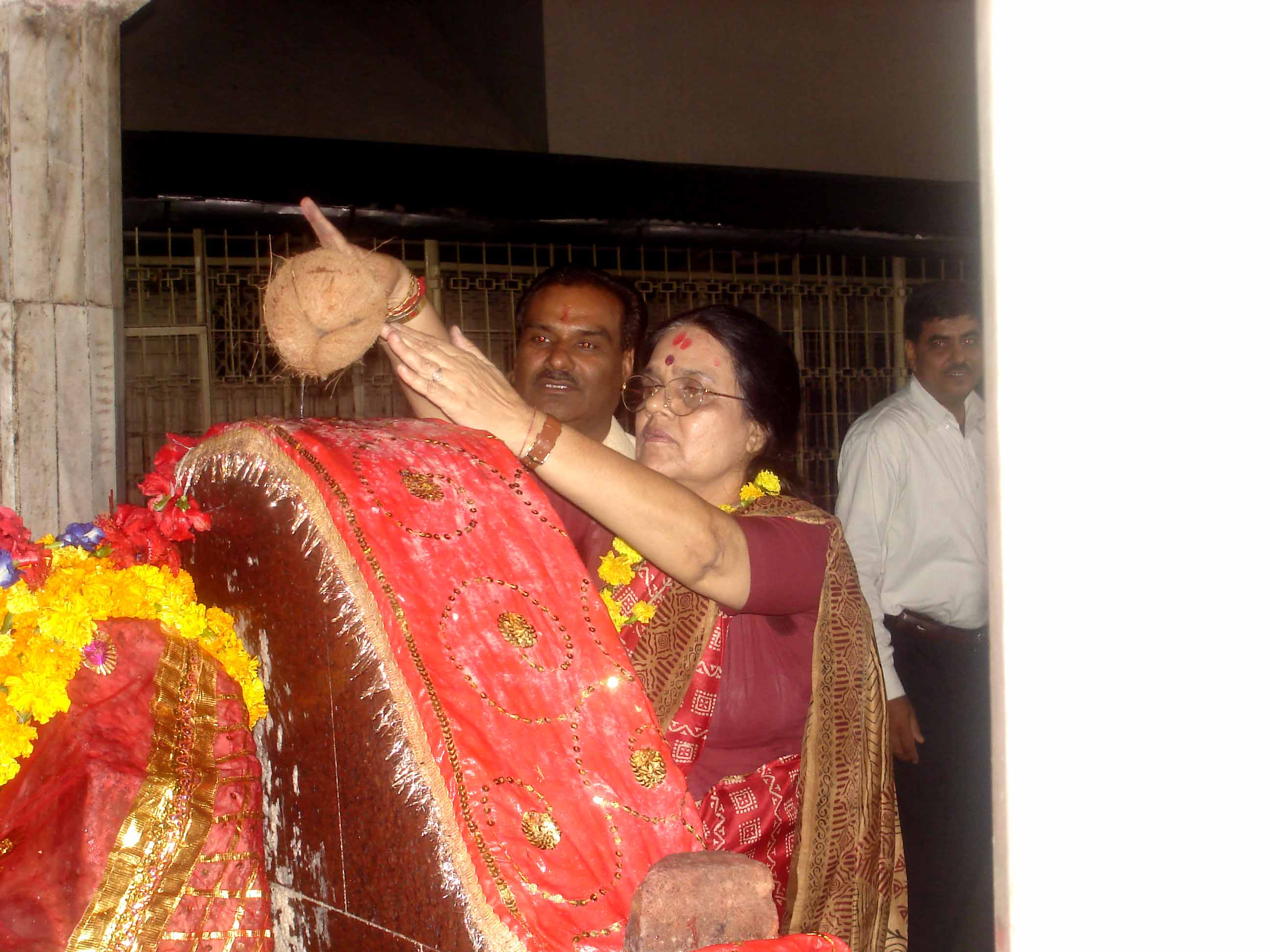
Puja at the temple of the left-handed goddess Kamakhya

Vamachara is particularly associated with the panchamakara or "Five Ms", also known as the panchatattva. In literal terms they are: madya ('wine'), mamsa ('meat'), matsya ('fish'), mudra ('grain'), and maithuna ('sexual intercourse'). Mudra usually means ritual gestures, but as part of the five Ms it is parched grain.

Vamachara traditions place strict ritual limits on the use of these literal forms and warn against nonsanctioned use. If so used they encourage the person to sin. Practitioners of vamachara rituals may make symbolic substitutions for these literal things, which are not permitted in orthodox Hindu practice. The fact that tantric practices can be done without involvement with the literal panchamakara is emphasized by Swami Madhavananda, and said to have been practiced by numerous saints.

=== Aghori ===
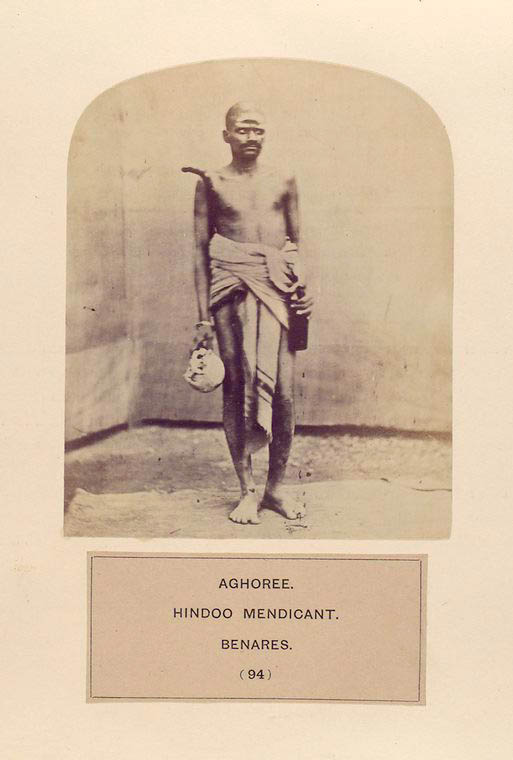
An Aghorī carrying a human skull, Varanasi, c. 1875

Barrett discusses the charnel ground sadhana of the Aghorī practitioners in both its left and right-handed proclivities and identifies it as principally cutting through attachments and aversion in order to foreground inner primordiality, a perspective influenced by a view by culture or domestication:

The gurus and disciples of Aghor believe their state to be primordial and universal. They believe that all human beings are natural-born Aghori. Hari Baba has said on several occasions that human babies of all societies are without discrimination, that they will play as much in their own filth as with the toys around them. Children become progressively discriminating as they grow older and learn the culturally specific attachments and aversions of their parents. Children become increasingly aware of their mortality as they bump their heads and fall to the ground. They come to fear their mortality and then palliate this fear by finding ways to deny it altogether. In this sense, Aghor sādhanā is a process of unlearning deeply internalized cultural models. When this sādhanā takes the form of shmashān sādhanā, the Aghori faces death as a very young child, simultaneously meditating on the totality of life at its two extremes. This ideal example serves as a prototype for other Aghor practices, both left and right, in ritual and in daily life.

== See also ==
- Kaula – Religious tradition in Hinduism
- Left-hand path and right-hand path – Dichotomy between two opposing approaches to magic
