= Yab-Yum =

Symbol in Tibetan Buddhist art

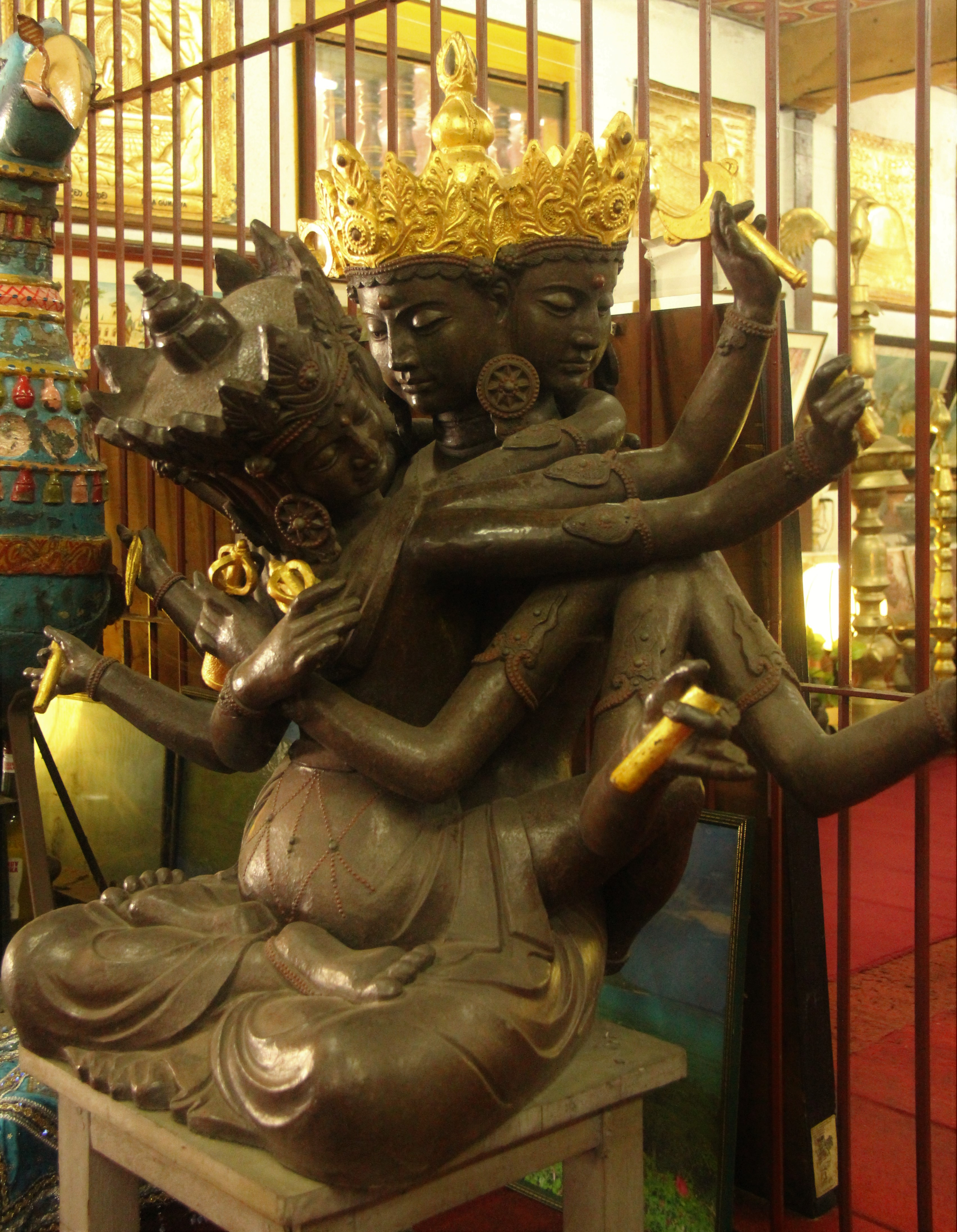
Heruka in Yab-Yum form. On display at Gangaramaya Temple museum

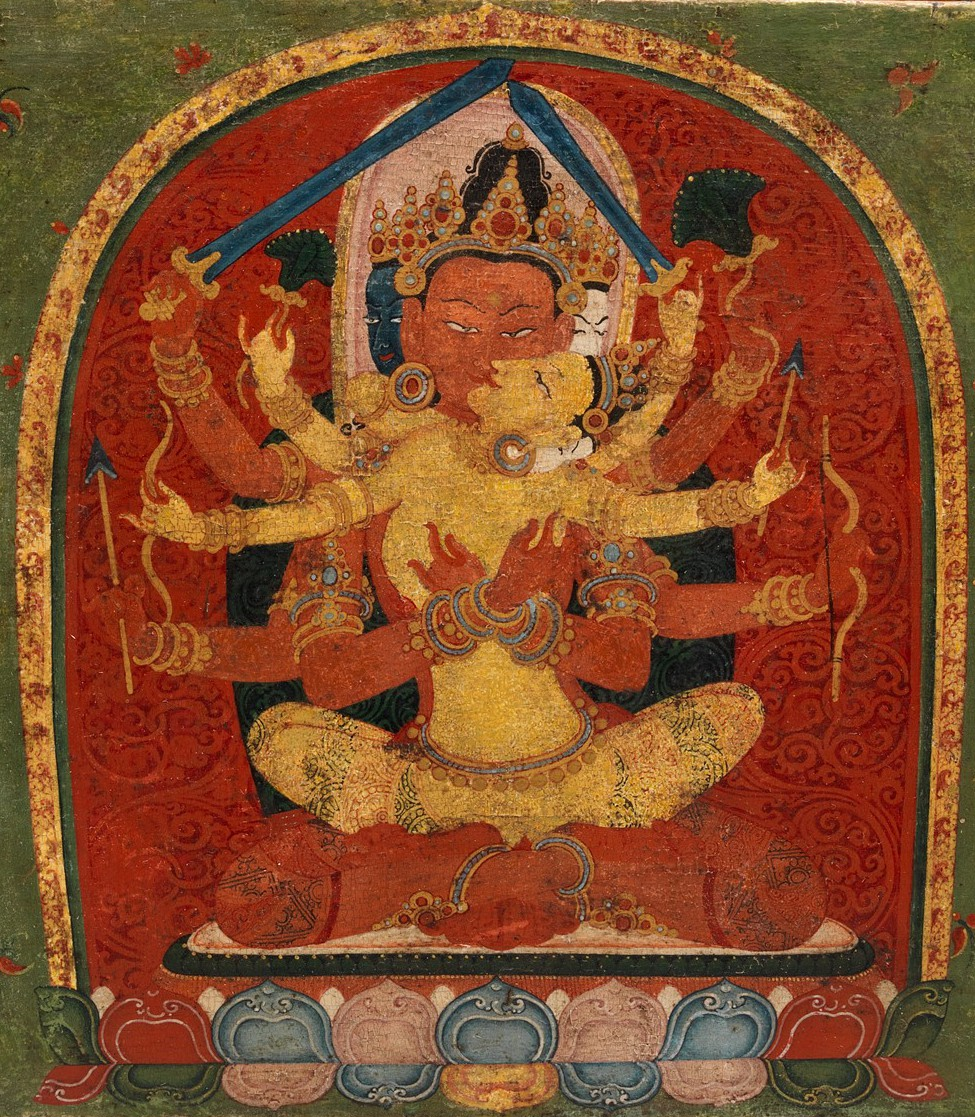
Tibetan book cover depicting Prajñāpāramitā Devi and Mañjuśrī in yab yum, late 13th century

Yab-yum (Tibetan: ཡབ་ཡུམ། literally, "father-mother") is a common symbol in the Tibetan Buddhist art of India, Bhutan, Nepal, and Tibet. It represents the primordial union of wisdom and compassion, depicted as a male deity in union with his female consort through the similar ideas of interpenetration or "coalescence" (Tibetan: ཟུང་འཇུག Wylie: zung-'jug; Sanskrit: yuganaddha), using the concept of Indra's net to illustrate this.

The male figure represents compassion and skillful means, while the female partner represents insight. In yab-yum the female is seated on the male's lap. There is a rare presentation of a similar figure but reversed, with the male sitting on the female's lap, called yum-yab.

== Origins ==
The symbolism is associated with Anuttarayoga tantra and, while there are various interpretations of the symbolism in twilight language, the male figure is usually linked to compassion (karuṇā) and skillful means (upāya-kauśalya), while the female partner is linked to "wisdom" (prajñā).

== Iconography ==
Yab-yum is generally understood to represent the primordial (or mystical) union of wisdom and compassion. In Buddhism the masculine form is active, representing the compassion and skillful means (upaya) that have to be developed in order to reach enlightenment. The feminine form is passive and represents wisdom (prajna), which is also necessary to enlightenment. United, the figures symbolize the union necessary to overcome the veils of Maya, the false duality of object and subject.

These figures are frequently worked in the shape of statues or reliefs, or are painted on thangkas. Yab-yum may also be represented through the aniconic signification of yantra and mandala.

=== Tibetan Buddhism ===
The symbolism of union and sexual polarity is a central teaching in Tantric Buddhism, especially in Tibet. The union is realised by the practitioner as a mystical experience within one's own body. Yab-yum represents the practice of the karmamudrā or "action-seal", a tantric yoga involving a physical partner.

The sacred Tantric practice leads to rapid development of mind by using the experience of bliss, non-duality, and ecstasy while in communion with one's consort, either visualized, or in the case of advanced practitioners, in some cases physical. In one important Anuttarayoga text, where Tilopa expounds the meaning to Naropa, it is said:

When you rely on a consort, the wisdom of empty bliss will arise, so enter into union—the blessing of method and wisdom. Bring it down slowly, retain it, reverse it, and draw it back up. Bring it to the places in the body and let it spread throughout. When you remain free of desire, the wisdom of empty bliss will appear.

Indicating the advanced nature of the actual practice with consort, the verses are the last in what is already widely considered as a text for the most advanced practitioners, a fact clearly evident in the story about Naropa's receiving the teaching.

== Gallery ==
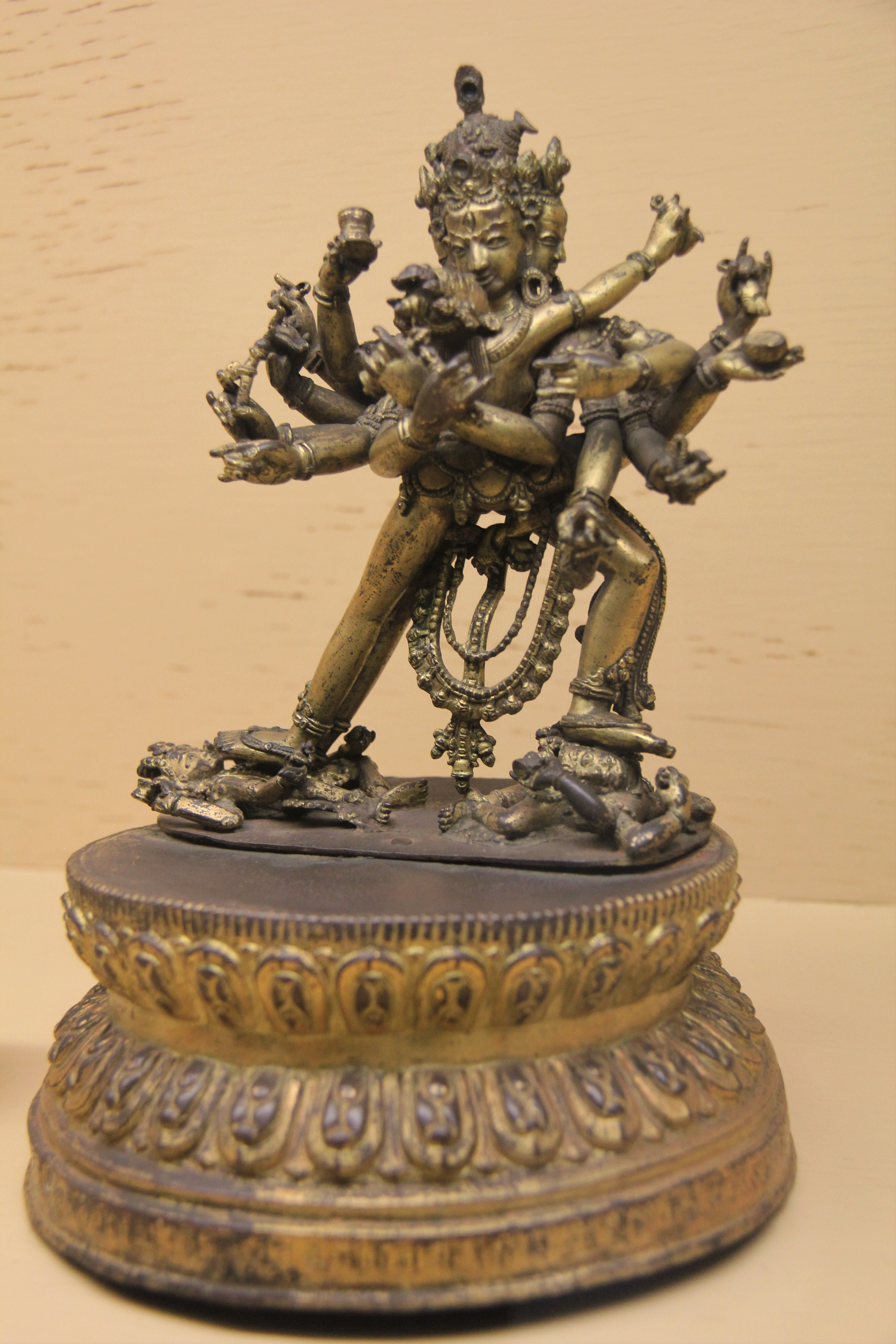
Heruka with prajna Vajravarahi (1544 AD). Discovered in Nepal, statue on display at Prince of Wales museum.

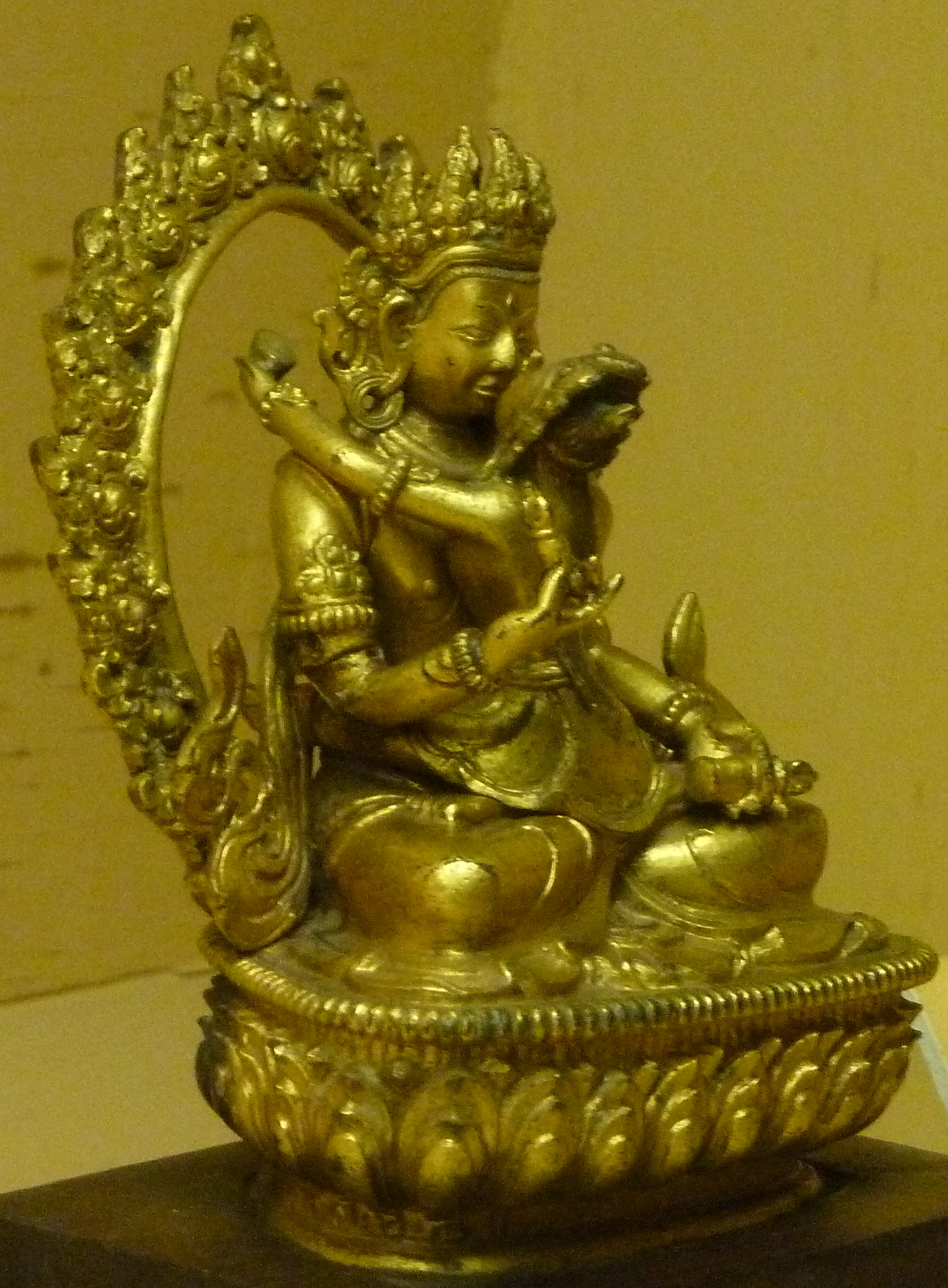
Padmasambhava in Yab-Yum

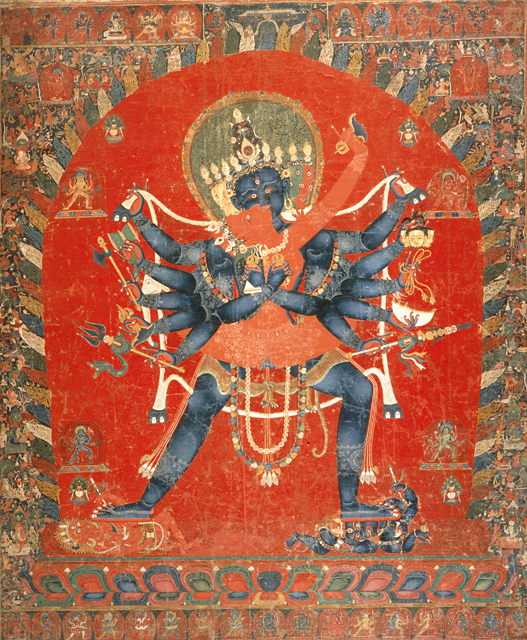
Chakrasamvara-Vajravarahi

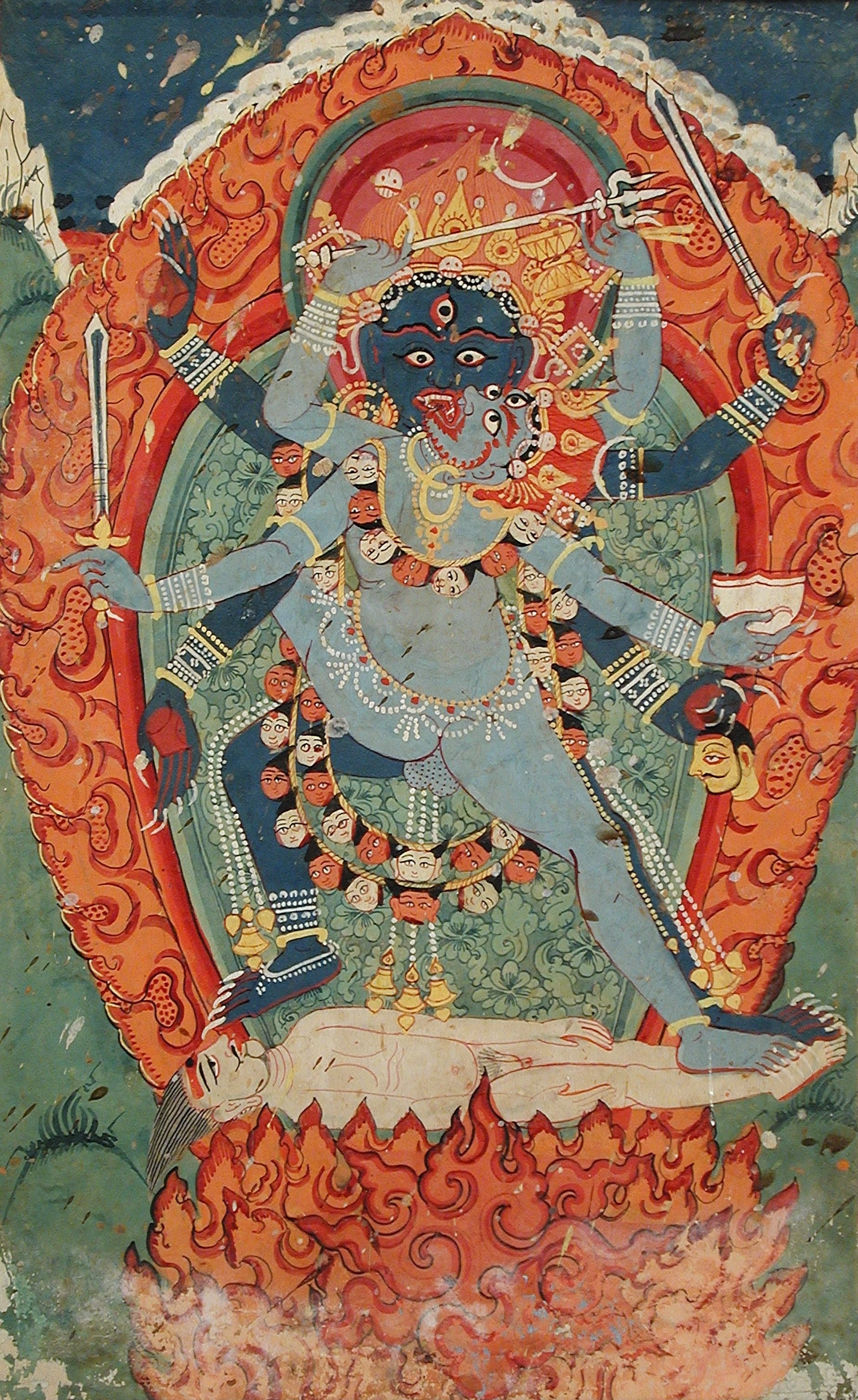
Bhairava and Kali in union

== See also ==
- Maithuna
