= Maithuna =

Sanskrit term used in Tantra most often translated as "sexual union"

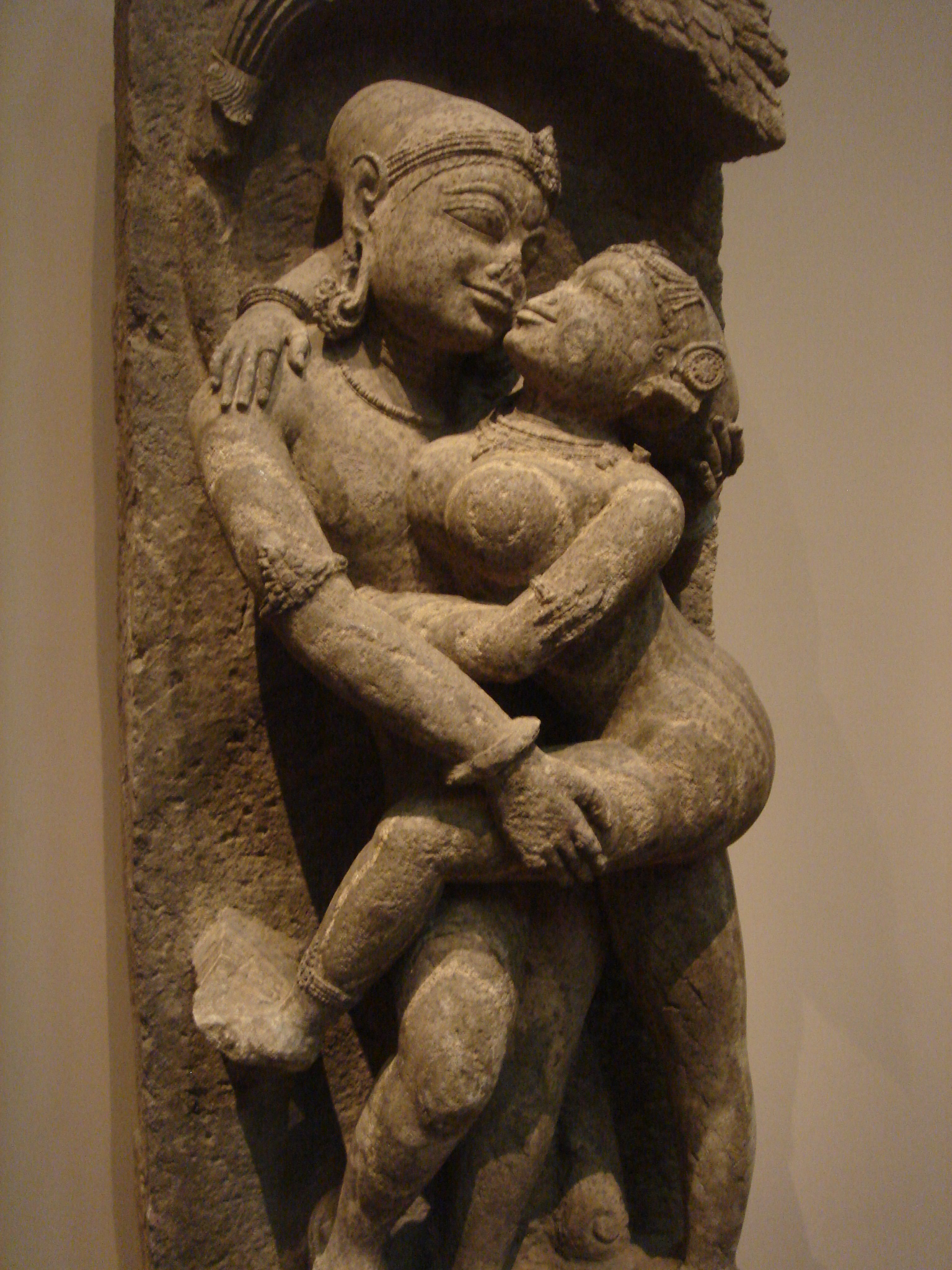
Loving Couple, Maithuna, Eastern Ganga dynasty, 13th century Orissa, India

Maithuna (Devanagari: मैथुन) is a Sanskrit term for sexual intercourse within Tantra (Tantric sex), or alternatively for the sexual fluids generated or the couple participating in the ritual. It is the most important of the Panchamakara and constitutes the main part of the grand ritual of Tantra also known as Tattva Chakra. Maithuna means the union of opposing forces, underlining the nonduality between human and divine, as well as worldly enjoyment (kama) and spiritual liberation (moksha). Maithuna is a popular icon in ancient Hindu art, portrayed as a couple engaged in physical loving.

== Concept ==
Maithuna entails male-female couples and their union in the physical, sexual sense as synonymous with kriya nishpatti (mature cleansing). Just as neither spirit nor matter by itself is effective but both working together bring harmony so is maithuna effective only then when the union is consecrated. The couple become for the time being divine: she is Shakti and he is Shiva, and they confront ultimate reality and experience bliss through union. The scriptures warn that unless this spiritual transformation occurs, the union is incomplete. However, some writers, sects and schools like Yogananda consider this to be a purely mental and symbolic act, without actual intercourse.

Yet it is possible to experience a form of maithuna not solely just through the physical union. The act can exist on a metaphysical plane with sexual energy penetration, in which the shakti and shakta transfer energy through their subtle bodies as well. It is when this transfer of energy occurs that the couple, incarnated as goddess and god via diminished egos, confronts ultimate reality and experiences bliss through sexual union of the subtle bodies.

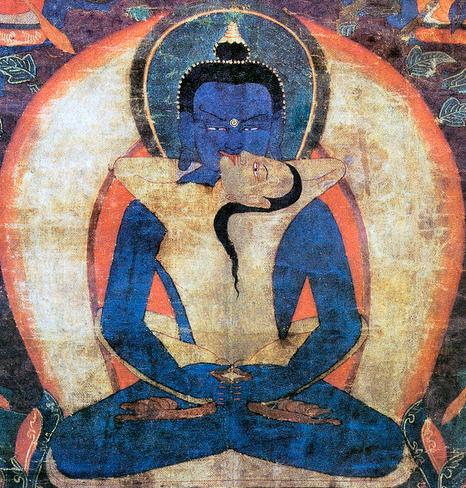
Adi-Buddha Samantabhadra, 17th century, Tibetan Buddhist Painting; depicting the Buddha in divine, meditative, sexual union

The maithuna was also adopted into Buddhist iconographic traditions. It is possible that in Buddhist contexts, these images pertain to the divine gardens filled with beauty outlined in the Buddhacharita. They also could simply be a reference to the pleasurable values of courtly life at the time. The maithuna image is found frequently in Tantric or Vajrayana Buddhism, often depicting the Buddha in divine sexual union with Shakti.

== History ==
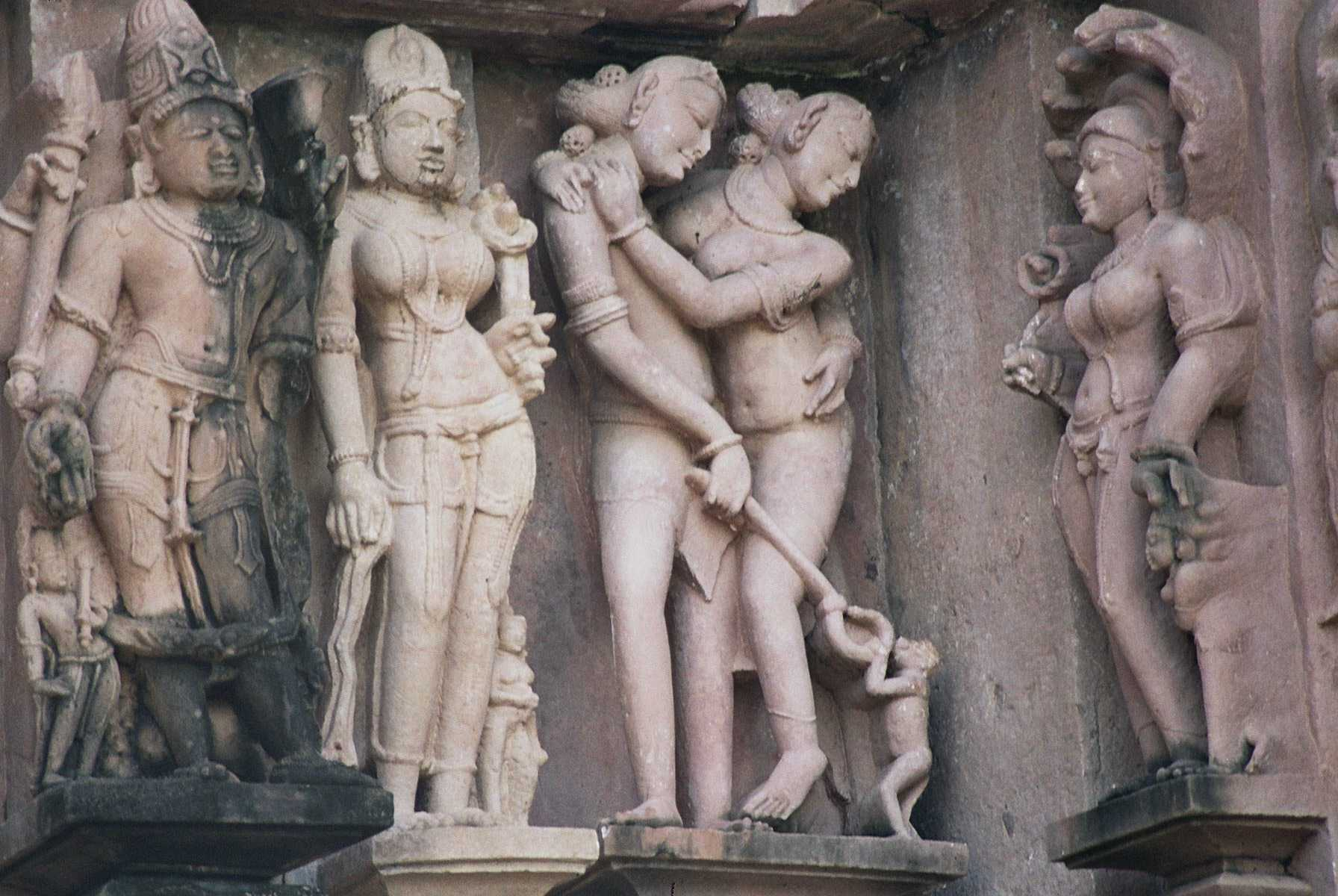
Maithuna, Lakshmana Temple, Khajuraho

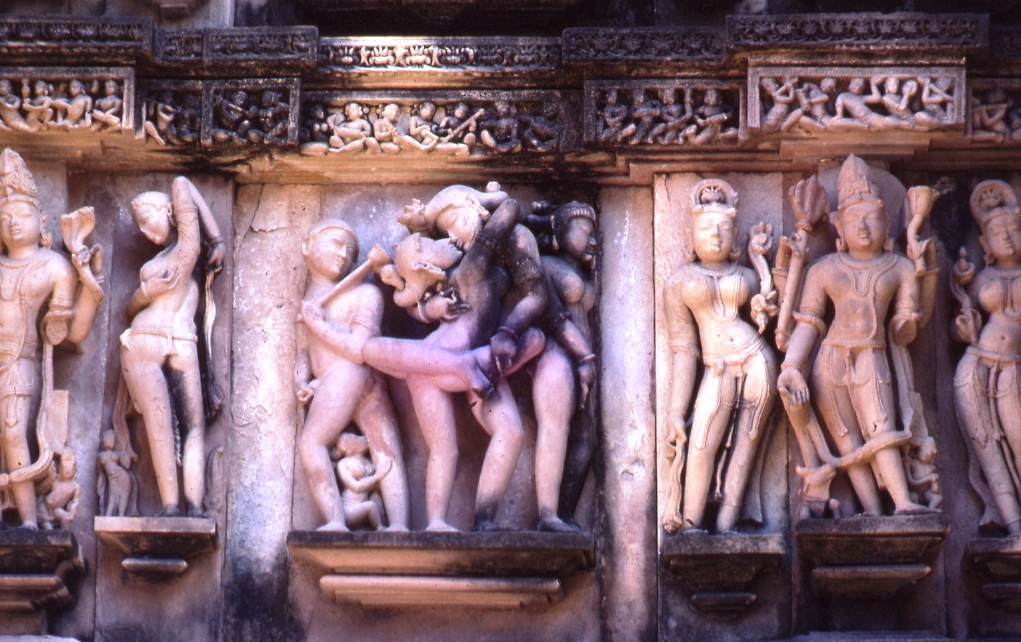
Maithuna, Lakshmana Temple, Khajuraho

Maithuna intercourse has been traditionally interpreted to be performed with semen retention by the male practitioner, although other writers consider it optional, possibly relegated only to late Tantra. Early maithuna might have insisted on generating sexual fluids (maithunam dravyam, or solely maithuna by metonymy) in order to be ritually ingested, in a similar way to the other four edible Panchamakara. The shedding of semen is also compared to water-offering (tarpana).

Ascetics of the Shaivite school of Mantramarga, in order to gain supernatural power, reenacted the penance of Shiva after cutting off one of Brahma's heads (Bhikshatana). They worshipped Shiva with impure substances like alcohol, blood and sexual fluids generated in orgiastic rites with their consorts. As part of tantric inversion of social regulations, sexual yoga often recommends the usage of consorts from the most taboo groups available, such as close relatives or people from the lowest sections of society. They must be young and beautiful, as well as initiates in tantra.

Jayanta Bhatta, the 9th-century scholar of the Nyaya school of Hindu philosophy and who commented on Tantra literature, stated that the Tantric ideas and spiritual practices are mostly well placed, but it also has "immoral teachings" such as by the so-called "Nilambara" sect where its practitioners "wear simply one blue garment, and then as a group engage in unconstrained public sex" on festivals. He wrote that this practice is unnecessary and it threatens fundamental values of society.

Later sources like Abhinavagupta in the tenth century warn that results of maithuna are not meant to be consumed like the rest of Panchamakara, calling those who do so "brutes" (pasus). The 11th century Toḍala tantra places maithuna as the last of its pañcamakāra or "set of 5 M-words", namely madya (wine), māṃsa (meat), matsya (fish), mudrā (grain), and maithuna.

Around the 12th century, practices seemed to turn towards the absorption of sexual fluids into the body of the practitioner, like that of vajroli mudra. This is related to similar practices like rajapana, the drinking of female discharge found in Kaula Tantra, and the mixing of all five ingredients into nectar (amrita) in the Jagannatha temple of Puri, as described by Frédérique Apffel-Marglin.

Douglas Renfrew Brooks states that the antinomian elements such as the use of intoxicating substances and sex were not animistic, but were adopted in some Kaula traditions to challenge the Tantric devotee to break down the "distinctions between the ultimate reality of Brahman and the mundane physical and mundane world". By combining erotic and ascetic techniques, states Brooks, the Tantric broke down all social and internal assumptions, became Shiva-like. In Kashmir Shaivism, states David Gray, the antinomian transgressive ideas were internalized, for meditation and reflection, and as a means to "realize a transcendent subjectivity".

Although often associated with Hindu contexts, maithuna images are also present in Buddhist spaces. Maithunas can be found on early terracottas and Buddhist spaces and stupas as early as the Shunga period (187 to 75 BCE) into the first centuries CE. Likely acting as apotropaic auspicious images due to the location of their placements (door jambs, tympana, portals, exterior railings, pillars, capitals,and entrances). Maithuna images found contemporary to the creation of the Kamasutra (200-300 CE) depict erotic couples in positions reflecting those outlined in narrative scenes from the Kamasutra text. Although the Kamasutra is a Hindu text, these images also permeated Buddhist spaces, showing the permeability of these images as part of the local, non-exclusive, pan-Indian iconographic vocabulary.
