= Dakshinachara =

Sanskrit term for orthodox practices

Dakṣiṇācāra is a tantric term meaning 'right-hand path'. It is used to describe tantric sects that do not engage in heterodox practices. In contrast, vamachara ('left-hand path') is used to describe particular tantric practices that are considered heterodox.

== Etymology ==
N. N. Bhattacharyya explains the Sanskrit technical term ācāra as follows:

The means of spiritual attainment which varies from person to person according to competence.... Ācāras are generally of seven kinds – Veda, Vaiṣṇava, Śaiva, Dakṣiṇa, Vāma, Siddhāṇta, and Kaula, falling into two broad categories – Dakṣiṇa and Vāma. Interpretations vary regarding the nature and grouping of the ācāras.

Dakṣiṇa means 'right'. For this reason, the term dakṣiṇāra is often translated "right-hand path".

== Practices ==
The Brahma Yamala, a tantric text, says there are three currents of tradition (dakshina, vama, and madhyama) characterized respectively by the predominance of each of the three gunas (sattva, rajas, and tamas). According to this text, dakshina is characterized by sattva, and is pure; madhyama, characterized by rajas, is mixed; and vama, characterized by tamas, is impure. The tantras of each class follow a particular line of spiritual practice. Dakshinachara consists of traditional Hindu practices such as asceticism and meditation.

== See also ==
- Left-hand path and right-hand path – Dichotomy between two opposing approaches to magic
- Pāñcarātra – Ancient Indian religious movement around Narayana-Vishnu (Vaishnavism)
- Vaikhanasa – Tradition of Hinduism
