= Hildegard Lamfrom =

Greek-American virologist

- Born: June 19, 1922; Augsburg, Germany
- Died: August 28, 1984 (aged 62); La Jolla, California
- Known for: protein translation
- Scientific career
- Fields: biochemistry, molecular biology
- Institutions: Cedars of Lebanon Hospital, Carlsberg Laboratory, Caltech, MRC Laboratory, Institut de Biologie Physico-Chimique, Institute of Molecular Biology in Eugene, Oregon, UCSD, Harvard Medical School
- Thesis: (1949)
- Doctoral advisor: Harry Goldblatt

Hildegard Lamfrom was a German-American molecular biologist/biochemist. She helped develop one of the first in-vitro translation systems, using rabbit reticulocyte lysate to study protein synthesis (a process called translation) in a cell-free context. This allowed her to make a number of contributions to the field including providing some of the first direct evidence for the existence of messenger RNA (mRNA) as a protein template, as well as the existence of polyribosomes (aka polysomes) (multiple ribosomes translating on the same mRNA).

== Early life and education ==
Lamfrom was born into a Jewish family in Augsburg, Germany, in 1922, the eldest of three sisters (Gertrude (Gert) Boyle and Eva). Her family fled Germany in 1937, when she was 15, and established themselves in Portland, Oregon. Her father, who had owned a shirt factory in Germany bought a small hat and cap company that the family grew into Columbia Sportswear. Her sister Gert Boyle would later run the company and become an entrepreneurial icon, later donating large amounts of money to cancer research in her sister's honor.

Hiledgard graduated from Grant High School in Portland. She then attended Reed College and financed her education by working in shipyards as a welder. She earned a BA in biology from Reed and did research on avian malaria with Ralph Macy. She then earned an MA from Oregon State University. She was accepted to Western Reserve (now Case Western Reserve University)'s medical school, but decided to focus on research. She studied the renin system with pathologist Harry Goldblatt at Case Western and earned her PhD in 1949.

== Career ==
Lamfrom went with her PhD advisor Harry Goldblatt to Cedars of Lebanon Hospital in Los Angeles. There, she continued to research the renin system for five more years. In 1955 went to study at Copenhagen's Carlsberg Laboratory on an American Heart Association Fellowship, working in Linderstrom-Lang's department. In 1958 she moved to Caltech where she did research with Henry Borsook. Here at Caltech, with Richard Schweet, she was able to help work out an in vitro system for studying hemoglobin synthesis in rabbit reticulocyte lysate. In this research, Hildegard was one of the first investigators to provide experimental evidence for the existence of messenger RNA, an informational molecule that directs the sequence of amino acids generated during protein synthesis. From 1962 to 1965 she continued research on protein synthesis at the MRC Laboratory in Cambridge, England, working with Francis Crick and Sydney Brenner. She then went to work at the Institut de Biologie Physico-Chimique in Paris (1965-1967). She went on to collaborate with her close friend Anand Sarabhai at the Institute of Molecular Biology in Eugene, Oregon from 1967-1970. The pair then researched in UCSD's chemistry department, where they collaborated with John Abelson to study tRNA synthesis. In the 1970's Lamfrom and Sarabhai spent extended periods of time in India and established a research laboratory called Biocenter. The last two years of her career were spent at Harvard Medical School, working with Tom Benjamin studying the involvement of middle T-antigen in tumor induction.

== Research ==
The beginning of Lamfrom's career was spent studying the renin-antirenin system with pathologist Harry Goldblatt. She then shifted to studying protein synthesis. Working with Richard Schweet at Caltech, and later with Paul Knopf at MRC, she helped develop one of the first in-vitro translation systems, using rabbit reticulocyte lysate to study protein synthesis (a process called translation) in a cell-free context. This allowed her to make a number of contributions to the field. By mixing components of different animal cells, and showing that sheep ribosomes (protein-making complexes) could make rabbit hemoglobin and vice versa, she provided some of the first direct experimental evidence for the existence of messenger RNA and its role in determining what protein ribosomes make. She also was one of the well as the existence of polyribosomes (aka polysomes) (multiple ribosomes translating on the same mRNA). The last two years of her career were spent at Harvard Medical School, working with Tom Benjamin studying the involvement of middle T-antigen in tumor induction.

== Personal life and honors ==
Lamfrom met her life partner, Anand Sarabha, in India. They hosted artisans, leading to unique collaborations. Lamfrom died from a brain tumor after nine months of illness on August 28, 1984, in La Jolla, California.

In 2015, Oregon Health & Science University (OHSU) named a biochemistry building in her honor. OHSU's Knight Cancer Institute provides Hildegard Lamfrom Research Scholar Awards to early-stage cancer researchers, with funding from an endowment established by her nephew, Tim Boyle, CEO of Columbia Sportswear, and his wife Mary. In 2010, her sister Gert Boyle gave an anonymous $100 million donation to the school in her sister's honor. Gert, Tim and Mary Boyle, donated $2.5 million to create the Hildegard Lamfrom Endowed Chair in Basic Science at the OHSU Knight Cancer Institute. Hildegard is remembered as an influential mentor to young scientists, including Brian Druker. In 2014, Tim and Mary donated $10 million to the Knight Cancer Institute at Oregon Health & Science University (OHSU) to create a mentorship fund in her honor.

== Key publications ==
- Lamfrom, Hildegard (1961-06-01). "Factors determining the specificity of hemoglobin synthesized in a cell-free system". Journal of Molecular Biology. 3 (3): 241–252. doi:10.1016/S0022-2836(61)80064-8. ISSN 0022-2836. PMID 13758530.
