= Shivaani Kummar =

Indian oncologist and physician-scientist

- Education: Delhi University
- Spouse: Sanjay Malhotra
- Children: 2
- Scientific career
- Fields: Medical oncology
- Workplaces: Yale University; Stanford University; Oregon Health & Science University

Shivaani Kummar is an Indian oncologist and physician-scientist specializing in early-phase cancer drug development. Since 2025, she has served as the interim chief executive of the Knight Cancer Institute at Oregon Health & Science University (OHSU), where Kummar has been a faculty member since 2020.

== Education ==
Kummar earned a Bachelor of Medicine, Bachelor of Surgery in 1992 from Lady Hardinge Medical College. She completed her residency in internal medicine at Emory University in 1995. Following this, she pursued a fellowship in medical oncology and hematology at the National Cancer Institute (NCI).

She is board-certified in internal medicine, medical oncology, and hematology. She was first certified in internal medicine by the American Board of Internal Medicine in 1995, with recertifications in 2005 and 2015. She obtained board certification in medical oncology in 1998, recertifying in 2008 and 2018, with her current certification extending until 2028. She was also board-certified in hematology from 2002 to 2012.

== Career ==
Kummar was a faculty member at Yale University. While at Stanford University, she held multiple positions, including professor of medicine and radiology, associate division chief for academic affairs, director of the phase I clinical research program, and co-director of the translational oncology program. Kummar is a fellow of the American College of Physicians.

In 2020, Kummar joined the Oregon Health & Science University's (OHSU) Knight Cancer Institute, where she was appointed as the head of the division of hematology and medical oncology, overseeing over 90 faculty members. She also became the co-director of the newly established Center for Experimental Therapeutics, which she leads alongside her husband, Sanjay Malhotra. Kummar is the Margaret and Lester DeArmond University Chair of Molecular Oncology.

In 2022, Kummar was named co-deputy director of the Knight Cancer Institute alongside Lisa Coussens. Her clinical research has been centered on early-phase clinical trials and the development of novel cancer treatments. Her research includes a variety of studies on cancer therapeutics, including investigations into immune checkpoint inhibitors, targeted therapies, and experimental oncology drugs.

In 2025, Kummar was appointed as the interim chief executive of the Knight Cancer Institute following the departure of Brian Druker. She also assumed the position of chief of the cancer business unit, a role aimed at integrating OHSU's clinical oncology services with Legacy Health amid OHSU's efforts to acquire the healthcare system.

== Personal life ==
Kummar met biologist Sanjay Malhotra while she was working at Yale University. They married and have two children.
