= Spella Caffè =

Coffee shop in Portland, Oregon, U.S.

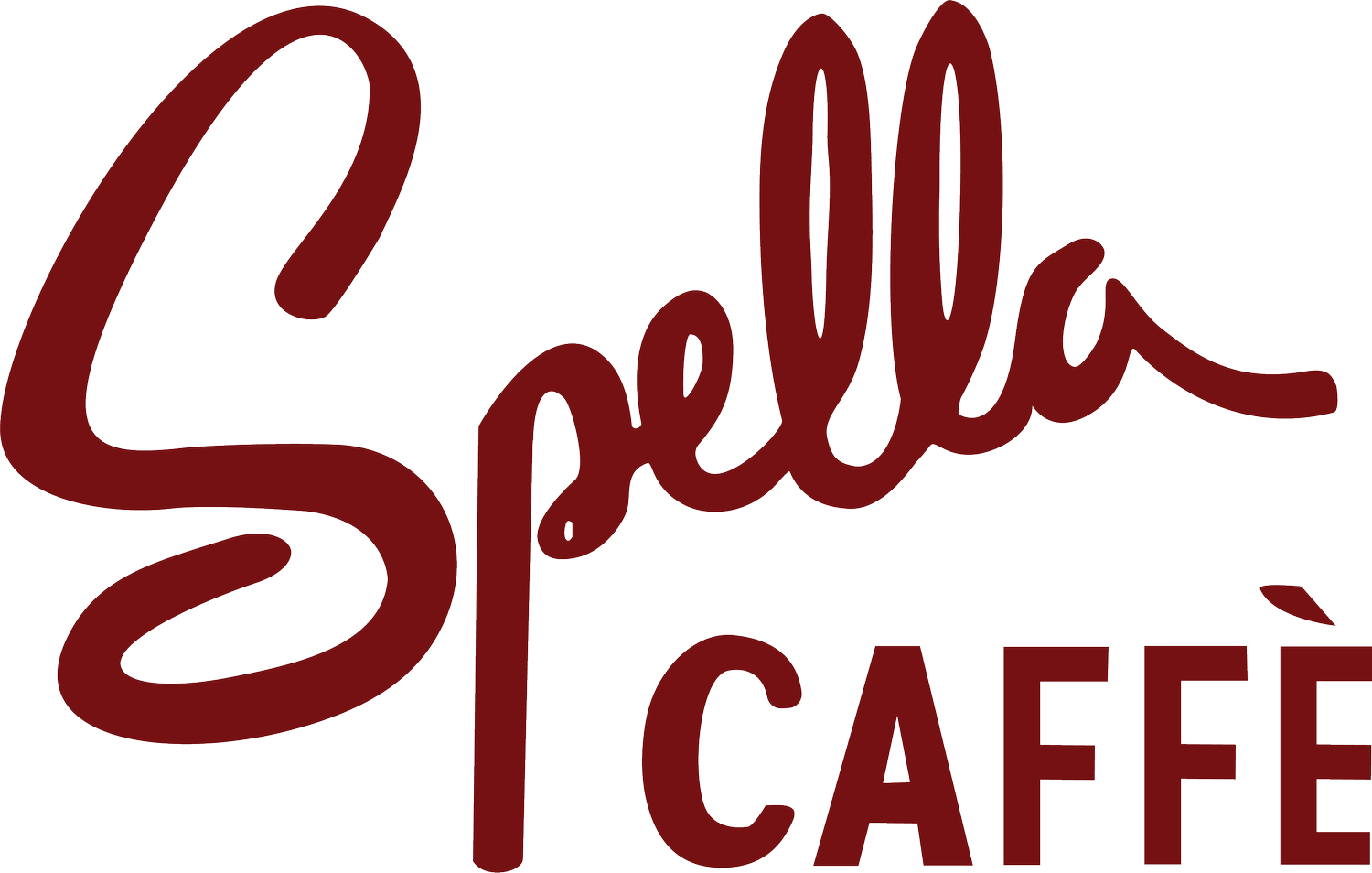

- Exterior of the shop in the Selling Building in 2025
- Interactive map of Spella Caffè

Restaurant information
- Owner: Andrea Spella
- Location: 608 Southwest Alder Street, Portland, Multnomah, Oregon, 97205, United States
- Coordinates: 45.51975°N 122.678556°W
- Website: spellacaffe.com

Spella Caffè is a coffee shop in Portland, Oregon, United States. Andrea Spella started the business as a cart in 2006, before opening a brick and mortar space in downtown Portland in 2010. The business has garnered a positive reception, and has been cited as an influence for other coffee company founders.

== Description ==
Spella Caffè is a coffee shop in downtown Portland. Willamette Week has described the business as "microroaster-retailer featuring traditional Italian-style espresso". The menu includes various coffee and espresso drinks such as shakeratos, as well as affogato, chais, gelato, and Italian sodas. Food options include baked goods such as biscotti, cookies, and quick breads.

== History ==
Andrea Spella founded Spella Caffè in October 2006, initially operating from a cart and using an Italian Rancilio lever machine. The Oregonian's Christina Melander said in 2008: "In less than two years, Andrea Spella's espresso cart Spella Caffe at the corner of Southwest Ninth Avenue and Alder Street has earned a reputation for the smoothest espresso shot in town — hand-pulled to order from his own fresh-roasted beans." Melander noted that the business' espresso-based drinks would become available at Alma Chocolate, an artisan confectionery in east Portland. In 2008, Andrea Spella expressed opposition to City Center Parking's request for carts at the parking lot between Southwest Ninth and 10th avenues and Alder and Washington streets to "limit power use to 20 amps of current to stop the outages".

Andrea Spella opened the cafe in the historic Yeon Building in downtown Portland in 2010. The business has one of the only hand-pulled lever espresso machines in the Pacific Northwest, as of 2012. A Spella Caffè espresso bar was also available in the Italian food hall and marketplace Cooperativa, prior to its closure in 2022. Shortly after, Spella, Cascadia Coffee Roasters, and Sterling Coffee announced plans to share a 2,750-square-foot (255 m^{2}) production facility in northeast Portland, with the goal of expansion for each. In late 2022, Andrea Spella closed the flagship cafe on Southwest 5th Avenue and a year later returned to downtown Portland in a similarly compact space previously occupied by Moonstruck Chocolate in the Selling Building at 608 Southwest Alder Street.

Spella Caffè coffee has been used by local restaurants; a dark roast was used for Raven & Rose's Irish coffee, and Fire on the Mountain's Vanilla Bourbon Coffee Stout was brewed with beans from Spella. Spella Caffè has been cited as an influence for other coffee company founders.

== Reception ==
Coffee cart (2010)

In 2008, The Oregonian's Noelle Crombie called the food cart "an ode to the perfect cup of espresso". Other writers of the newspaper said:

Spella's hand-roasted Brazilian beans are softer and sweeter --more Italian if you will --than what typically flies around town. The result? A thick, rich, roasty espresso with a creamy, bubble-tight cap of crema on top --the kind of mythical sip you stumble upon in Rome. Everything here is worth sampling, from barely sweet mochas with Italian cocoa powder to toothy, real-deal biscotti meant for dunking.

The newspaper's food critic Karen Brooks said Stella had Portland's best espresso in 2008. She included the business in a 2009 list of the city's top ten food carts and said Spella had "the best Italian-style espresso and cappuccinos around". David Stabler called the shop "locally acclaimed" in 2010. In 2011, writers for The Oregonian said Andrea Spella "hand-pulls some of the city's best espresso". In the newspaper's 2017 list of downtown Portland's ten best coffee shops, Samatha Bakall described Spella as a "perennially packed, closet-sized Italian cafe tucked into a downtown office building". She recommended it "for a quick espresso (sipped standing, of course) or an early afternoon affogato, where hot espresso is poured over a scoop of gelato", but suggested workers take their drinks out, noting there is "barely enough room to wait".

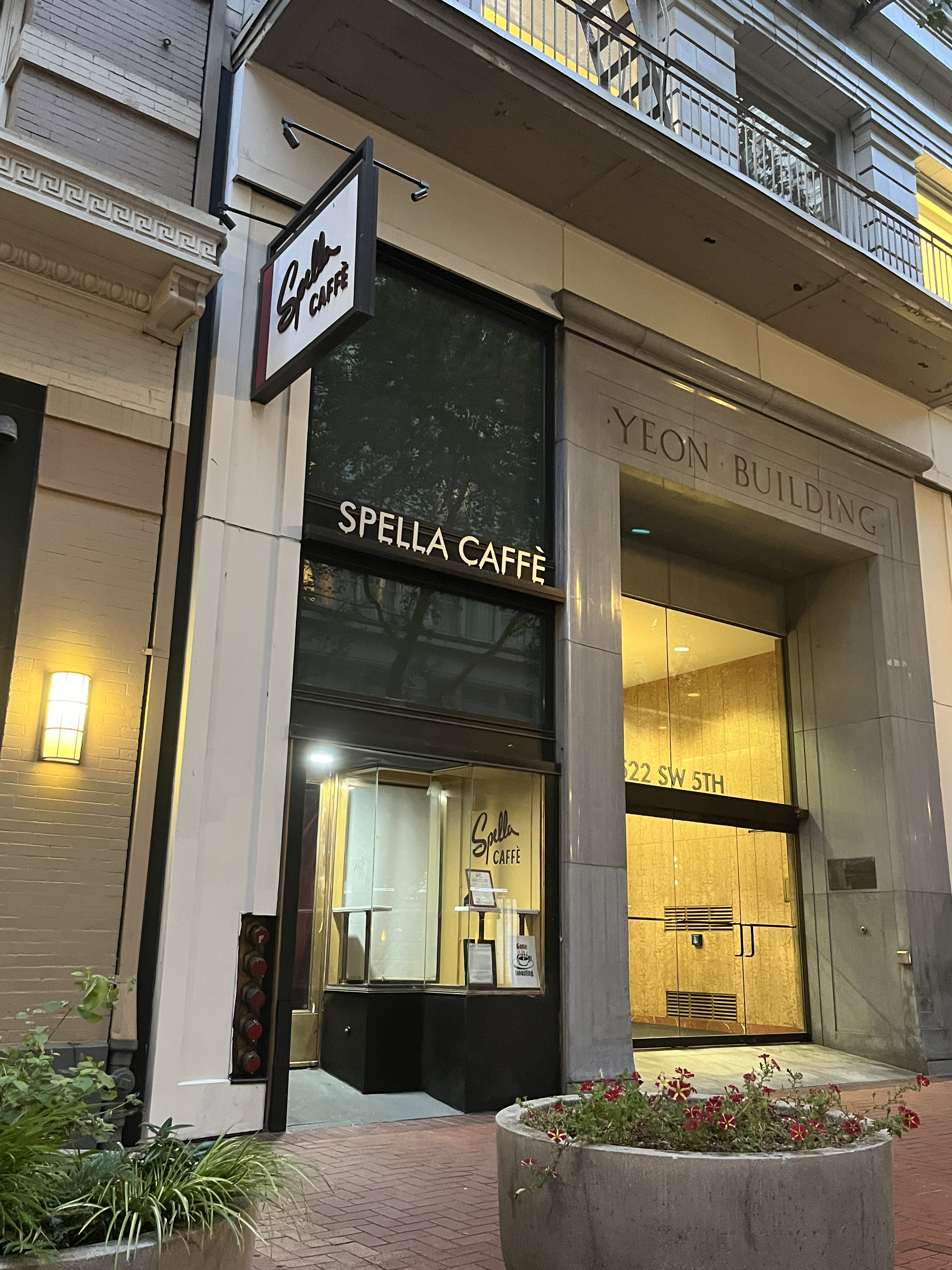
Exterior of the shop in the Yeon Building, 2022

In the book Best Places: Portland (2010), John Gottberg and Elizabeth Lopeman recommended Spella for "flawless, roman-style" drinks and affogato "as a refreshing treat" in the summer. In her Food Lovers' Guide to Portland, Oregon (2014), Laurie Wolf recommended the "dreamy, chocolate-flaked stracciatella gelato in the warmer weather", acknowledging she "would eat it outside in a snowstorm". The Portland Books of Dates (2021) says "splitting a rich affogato in the window of the Italian-style (and adorably miniature) Spella Caffè is an experience unlike any other in town".

In Willamette Week's 2016 list of five "essential old-school Portland cafes", Jordan Michelman said Spella offers the city's best shakerato and wrote, "Andrea Spella's love letter to the Italian espresso tradition is still as relevant and quality-focused as ever, celebrating 10 years at his postage-stamp-sized cafe... The place is intentionally unbeholden to the whims of fashion, instead aiming for a consistent daily offering". In Food & Wine's 2019 overview of Portland's coffee scene, David Landsel wrote, "Andrea Spella's welcoming little cafe, with its well-trained baristas, holds an outsized spot in the heart of many a downtown worker. This one's for the grownups [...] who, every now and then, require a delicious affogato to make it through their afternoon."

Teresa K. Traverse called the shop "charming and cozy" in The Daily Meal's 2014 suggestions for "how to spend 12 hours in Portland". Delia Mooney of Tasting Table included Spella in a 2017 list of Alton Brown's favorite coffee shops as part of his Eat Your Science tour. In a 2021 list of 14 "distinctive Portland cafés that roast their own coffee", Eater Portland called Spella "a proud homage to Italian coffee making".
