= Pinolo Gelato =

Gelateria in Portland, Oregon, U.S.

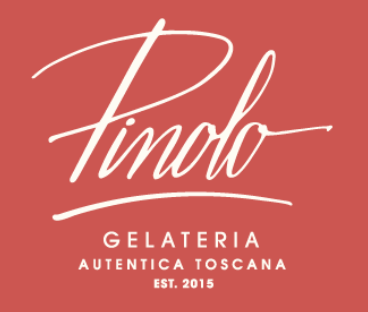

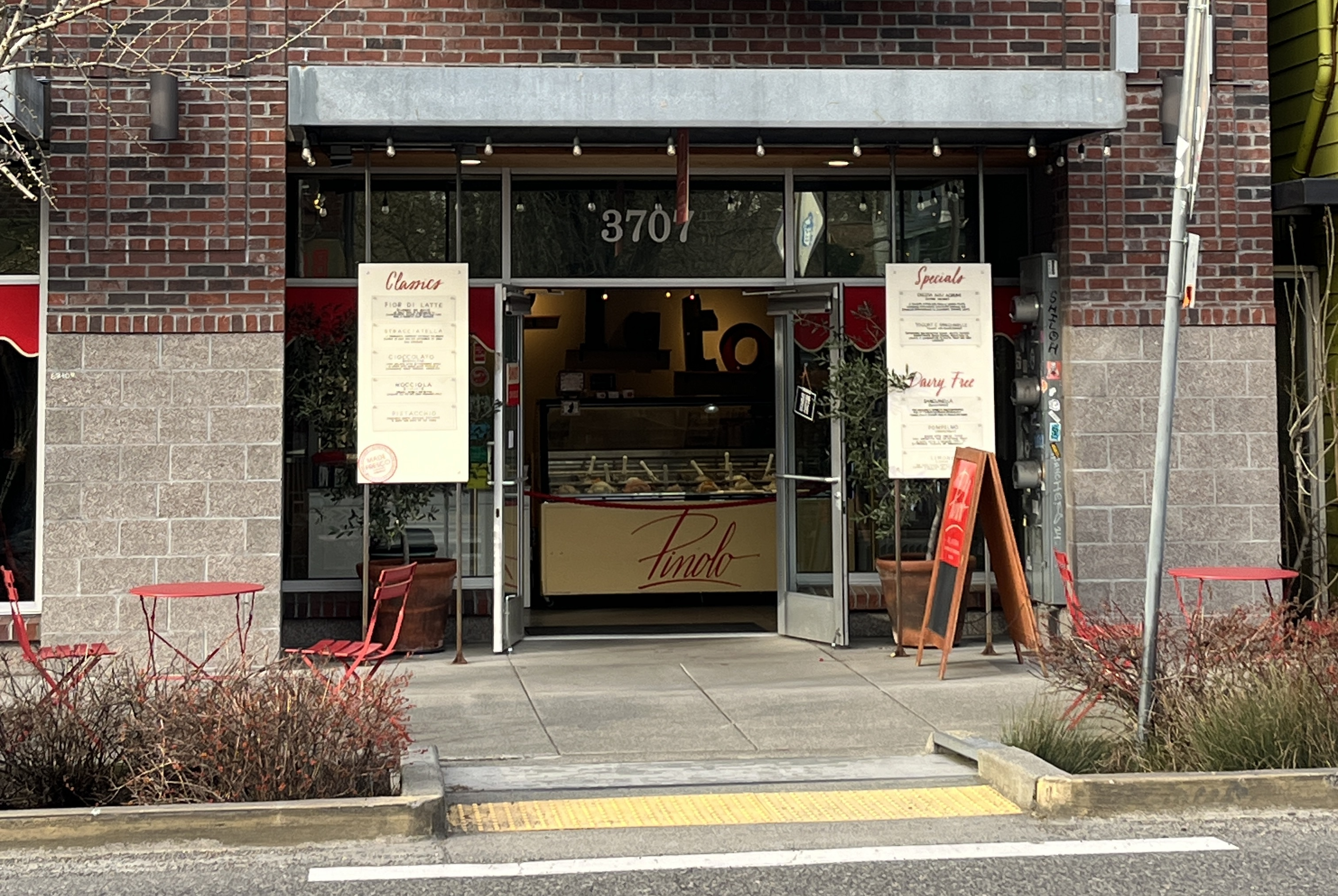
- The shop's exterior in 2025
- Interactive map of Pinolo Gelato

Restaurant information
- Established: June 2015
- Owner: Sandro Paolini
- Location: 3707 Southeast Division Street, Portland, Multnomah, Oregon, 97202, United States
- Coordinates: 45.5049°N 122.6253°W
- Website: pinologelato.com

Pinolo Gelato is a gelateria in Portland, Oregon, United States. Owner Sandro Paolini opened the shop in southeast Portland's Richmond neighborhood in 2015.

== Description ==
The gelateria Pinolo Gelato operates from the ground floor of an apartment complex on Division Street in southeast Portland's Richmond neighborhood. According to The Oregonian, the business is "named for the specialty pine nut gelato from Pisa". The shop serves Italian-style gelatos and sorbets; among creamy and dairy-free varieties are almond-fig, cassata, chocolate, huckleberry-thyme, pistachio, stracciatella, and other fruit flavors. The business also serves coffee drinks and affogato using beans from Caffè Umbria. Pinolo makes agreste with marionberries from Topaz Farm.

== History ==
Owner Sandro Paolini opened the shop in June 2015. The business hosted a gelato-making class in 2018.

The defunct food hall and market Cooperativa carried Pinolo products.

== Reception ==
In 2015, Willamette Week said Pinolo "immediately took over as the best gelato in town—the others aren't even close". Samantha Bakall included Pinolo in The Oregonian's 2017 list of Portland's best dessert eateries for Valentine's Day. Lizzy Acker included the affogato in the newspaper's 2019 list of the seventeen "prettiest cold treats" in the metropolitan area. In 2024, The Oregonian called Pinolo "an authentic Tuscan gelato shop where classic flavors reign".

Portland Monthly included Pinolo in a 2017 list of the city's most kid-friendly restaurants. The magazine's Kelly Clarke also included the business in a 2017 list of recommended eateries in Portland's Division/Clinton area. Portland Monthly's 2024 overview of the city's best ice cream said, "Pinolo's is top-tier, not just for Portland but for the United States, and dare we say, Italy." The magazine also recommended eating Pinolo's gelato made with foraged fruit in a 2024 "quintessential" Portland "bucket list" of 50 activities. In 2019, Jen Stevenson of 1859 Oregon's Magazine called Pinolo "deliciously authentic" and where "Tuscan technique meets Pacific Northwest ingredients".

The business has been included in multiple Eater Portland lists, including one of the best dairy-free frozen desserts in 2023, another of the best ice cream in the metropolitan area in 2024, and one of the best restaurants on Division Street in 2025. In 2023, Pinolo ranked twelfth in a list of the highest-rated ice cream shops in Portland, based on Yelp reviews. Pinolo scored 4.5 out of 5, based on 302 reviews. Noms Magazine included Pinolo in a 2024 overview of the city's best ice cream. Pinolo received honorary mention in Eat This, Not That's 2025 overview of the best ice cream shops in each U.S. state. Serious Eats has recommended the hazelnut gelato.

== See also ==
- List of ice cream parlor chains
