= Gert Boyle =

German-American businesswoman

Gertrude Boyle
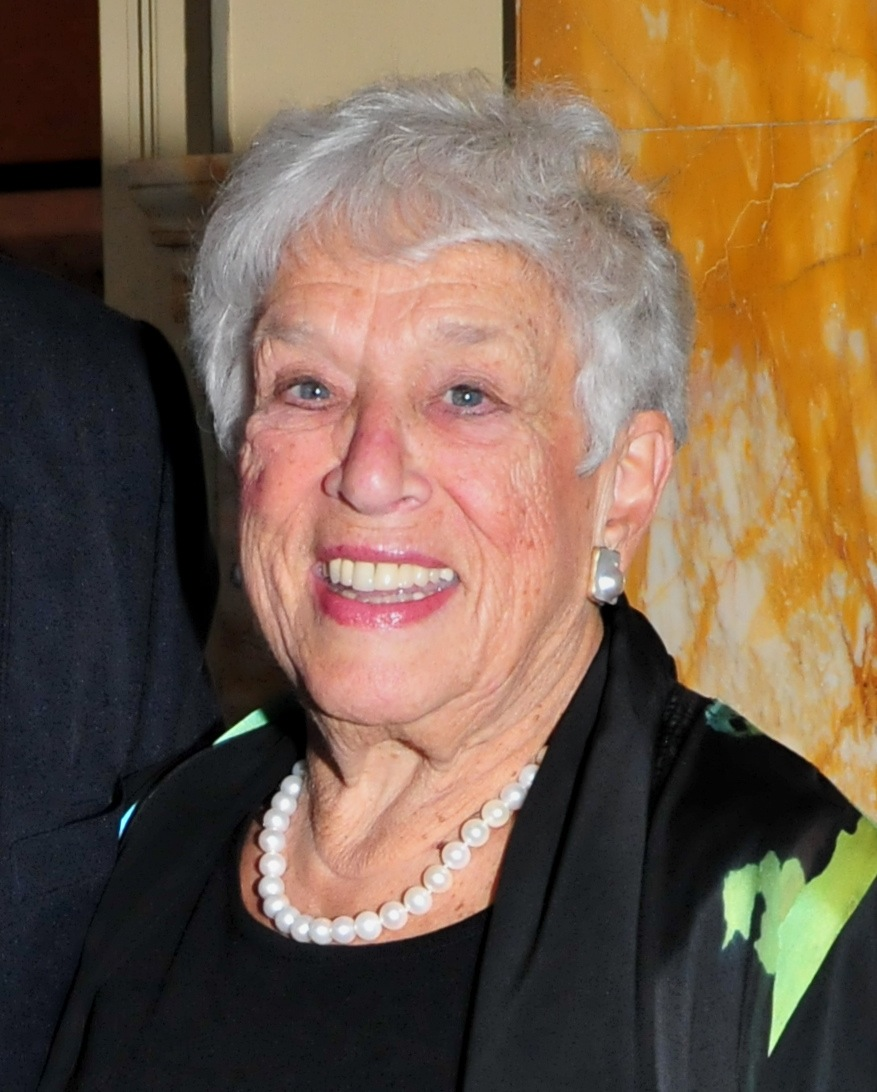
- Gert Boyle in 2013
- Born: Gertrude Lamfrom; March 6, 1924; Augsburg, Germany
- Died: November 3, 2019 (aged 95); Portland, Oregon, U.S.
- Education: University of Arizona (BA)
- Occupation: Businesswoman
- Known for: Chairwoman of Columbia Sportswear
- Spouse: Neal Boyle (m. 1948; died 1970)
- Children: 3, including Timothy Boyle
- Relatives: Hildegard Lamfrom (sister)

Gertrude Boyle (née Lamfrom; March 6, 1924 – November 3, 2019) was a German-born American businesswoman in the U.S. state of Oregon. After her family fled Nazi Germany, her father founded the business that became Columbia Sportswear, where in 1970, she became company president. She remained president until 1988 and additionally, was chairwoman of the company's board of directors from 1983 until her death in 2019. Starting in the 1980s, she appeared in a series of advertisements for Columbia Sportswear with her son, Timothy Boyle, often humorously testing the quality and durability of their products. She was also a philanthropist and memoirist.

== Early life and education ==
Born Gertrude Lamfrom to a German Jewish family in Augsburg, Germany, she was the daughter of Marie (née Epstein) and Paul Lamfrom. Her father owned the largest shirt factory in Germany until it was seized. Her mother was a nurse during World War I. In 1937, when she was 13, her family fled Nazi Germany and migrated to the United States, settling in Portland, Oregon. Her grandmother, who had remained in Germany, died in a concentration camp. When the family arrived in the US, she did not speak English. In 1938, her father borrowed money from a relative and purchased the Rosenfeld Hat Company, changing its name to the Columbia Hat Company (after the river). She attended Grant High School in Portland, and later graduated with a B.A. in sociology from the University of Arizona.

== Career ==
In 1964, Boyle's father died and her husband, Neal Boyle, became president; her husband diversified the hat business into outerwear for hunters, fishermen, and skiers. In 1960 the name of the company was changed to Columbia Sportswear. In 1970, her husband died unexpectedly at the age of 47 of a heart attack; she became president of the company, then with $800,000 in annual sales. The company struggled and teetered on bankruptcy until, in the 1970s, she and her son Timothy refocused the business on outdoor clothing and casual wear which paralleled a general trend away from formal work attire. In 1975, they were the first company to introduce Gore-Tex parkas.

In 1983, Boyle became chairwoman of Columbia's board of directors, a position she ultimately retained for 36 years, until her death in 2019.

Boyle started starring in commercials for the company in 1984. In the ads she stars as Ma Boyle, who is "One Tough Mother" and uses her son as a test dummy for new products. In 1986, they released the Bugaboo, a jacket with a zip out lining which became quite trendy and further propelled the company's growth. Columbia was unique among specialty clothing manufacturers in that it would sell its products to any retail shop or chain. In 1987, Columbia had $18.8 million in sales and by 1997 it had grown to $353.5 million. The company went public in 1998.

She stepped down as company president in 1988, handing the reins to her son Tim, but remained chairwoman of the board.

== Philanthropy ==
In 1995, Boyle outfitted the Special Olympics Team USA for the World Games. She donated the royalties from her autobiography One Tough Mother to the Special Olympics and Court Appointed Special Advocates for Children. In 2010, she endowed the Hildegard Lamfrom Chair in Basic Science in association with the Knight Cancer Institute at Oregon Health and Science University with $2.5 million which honors her sister, Hildegard, a pioneering molecular biologist who died from a brain tumor in 1984. In 2014, Boyle donated $100 million to the Knight Cancer Institute.

== Personal life ==
In 1948, she married Joseph Cornelius "Neal" Boyle, an Irish American from Pennsylvania whom she met in college, at All Saints Church in Portland, Oregon. She converted to her husband's Catholic faith. They had three children: Timothy Boyle (born 1949); Kathy Boyle (born 1952); and Sally Boyle (born 1958). Her son Tim has served CEO of Columbia since 1988; Kathy is an artist and real estate saleswoman and Sally is the co-owner of Moonstruck Chocolate, an upscale chocolatier. Her husband, Neal, died in 1970, and she never remarried.

In 2010, she was tied up at gunpoint by an armed robber in her home in West Linn, Oregon. She was able to trigger a silent alarm which alerted police, and the robber was later captured.

Boyle died in an assisted living facility in Portland on November 3, 2019, at age 95. Her cause of death was not disclosed.

== Awards and honors ==
- 1992 Inc. Magazine’s Northwest Entrepreneur of the Year
- 1998 Golden Plate Award of the American Academy of Achievement
- 2003 The National Sporting Goods Association Hall of Fame
- 2018 ISPO Cup
