= Art collection of Oregon Health & Science University =

Art collection

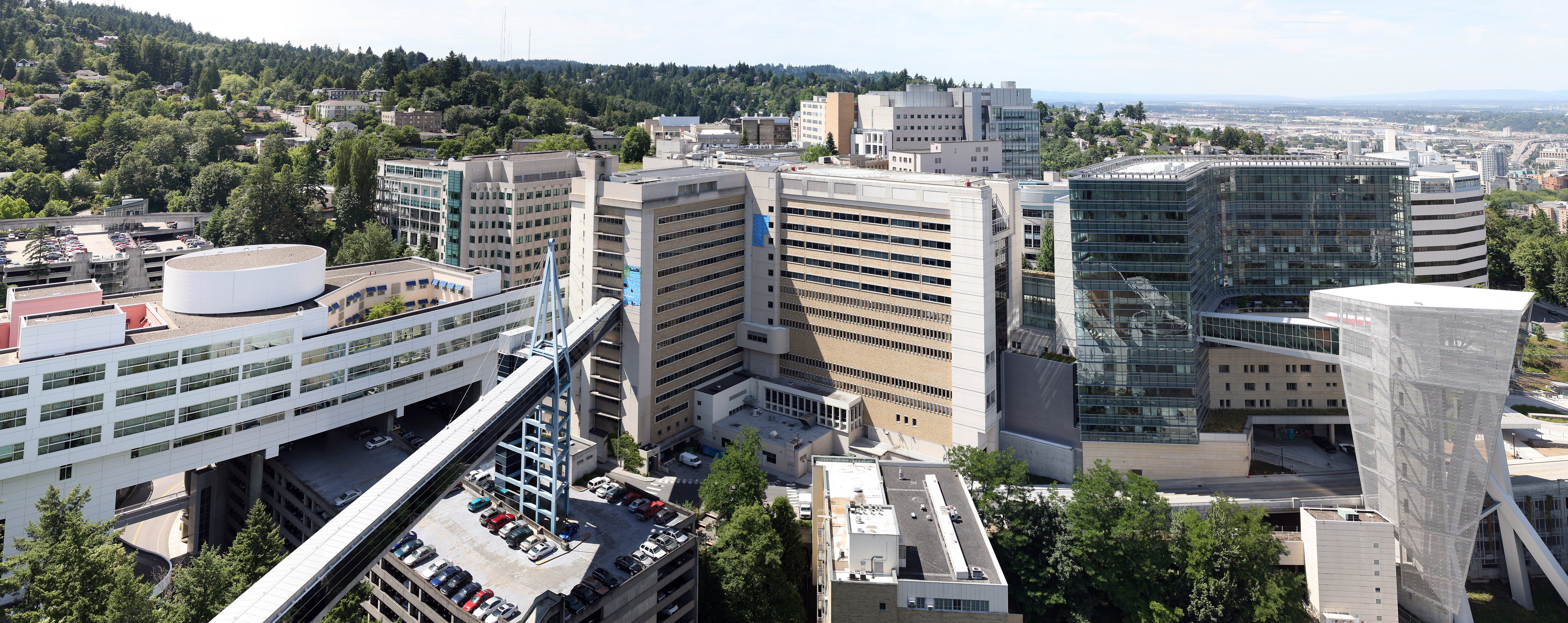
Oregon Health Sciences University.

Oregon Health & Science University (OHSU) has an extensive art collection, the OHSU Collection, with approximately 900 artworks displayed throughout the institution's campus in Portland, Oregon. The collection emphasizes Pacific Northwest art and artists.

== History ==
The OHSU Marquam Hill Art Committee was created in 1984 to add art throughout the institution's Marquam Hill campus. The art collection was established in 1985 with nine paintings by Carl Morris. In 1995, an anonymous donor funded art for the Doernbecher Children's Hospital, further expanding OHSU's collection.

== Artworks ==
Artworks in the Marquam Hill collection include:

- Big Balance (1997), Frank Boyden and Brad Rude
- Blind Man and Loon (1995), Jacque and Mary Regat
- Intersecting Light (1984), Carl Morris
- New Friends, Two Eves (1999), Mary Josephson
- Oregon Fabric (1994), Bruce West
- Sibyls (1997), Dinh Q Le'
- Towers and Rocks (2007), Jack Portland
- Trust (2005), Kim Osgood
- Vita Mensae Living Mind, Life of Thought (1992), Larry Kirkland, Center for Research on Occupational and Environmental Toxicology (CROET)

The Peter O. Kohler Pavilion's (formerly Patient Care Facility) terrace features Mother and Child and Standing Lady Hare with Dog.

Christian Moeller's 40-foot (12 m) galvanized steel sculpture is installed outside the Collaborative Life Sciences Building.

== Publications ==
- The Marquam Hill Art Committee (2011). Art on the Hill: Works from the OHSU Collection. Oregon Health & Science University. ISBN 978-0979131417.
