= Melissa Wong =

American stem cell biologist

- Education: University of Colorado Boulder; Wake Forest University
- Scientific career
- Workplaces: Oregon Health & Science University
- Website: www.ohsu.edu/school-of-medicine/wong-lab

Melissa Wong is an American biologist known for her work describing cell fusion, the cancer stem cell niche, and early detection strategies. She currently holds appointments at Oregon Health & Science University in the Department of Cell, Developmental and Cancer Biology and co-leads the Knight Cancer Institute's Cancer Biology program.

== Education and career ==
Wong received her bachelor's degree in Molecular, Cellular, and Developmental Biology from the University of Colorado Boulder. She completed her graduate training in molecular pathobiology at Wake Forest University under the supervision of Paul Dawson. She joined the laboratory of renowned microbiologist Jeffrey I. Gordon at Washington University in St. Louis for her post-doctoral work. In 2001, she accepted a joint faculty position at Oregon Health & Science University in the departments of Dermatology and Cell and Developmental Biology. Her lab is located in the Knight Cancer Research building.
