= Oregon Health & Science University =

Medical university in Portland, Oregon, United States

Oregon Health and Science University
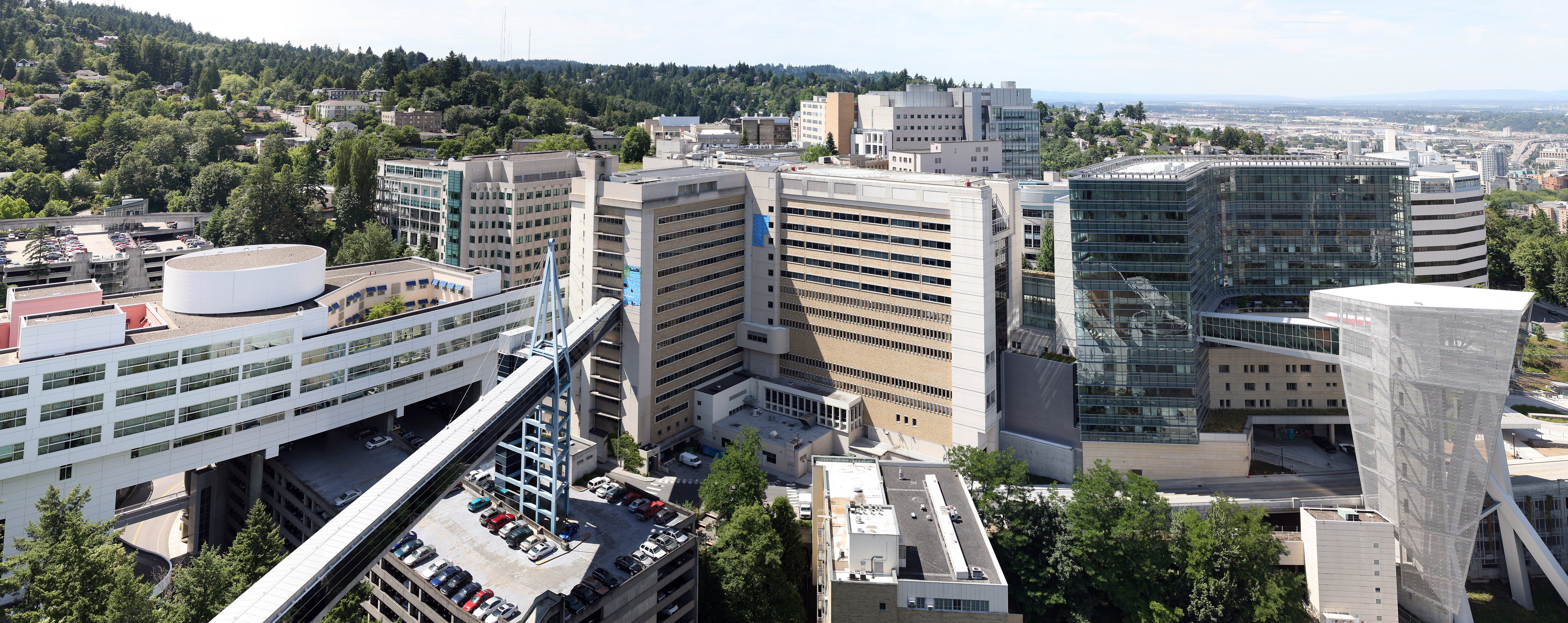
- Oregon Health Sciences University
- Former names: Willamette University College of Medicine (1867–1913); University of Oregon Medical Department (1887–1915); Tacoma College of Dental Surgery (1892–1899); Oregon College of Dentistry (1898–1899); North Pacific College of Dentistry (1899-1908); North Pacific College of Oregon (1908–1945); University of Oregon Medical School (1915–1974); University of Oregon Health Sciences Center (1974–1981); Oregon Health Sciences University (1981–2001); Oregon Graduate Center of Science and Technology (1963–1989); Oregon Graduate Institute of Science and Technology (1989–2001)
- Motto: "Where Healing, Teaching and Discovery Come Together"
- Type: Public research university
- Established: June 16, 1887; 139 years ago
- Accreditation: NWCCU
- Endowment: $1.3 billion (2025)
- President: Shereef Elnahal
- Provost: Marie Chisholm-Burns
- Students: 4,123 (total)
- Location: Portland, Oregon, United States; 45°29′56.1″N 122°41′19.5″W
- Campus: 400 acres (1.6 km^{2}); Large city
- Colors: Horizon; Marquam; Terwilliger; Charcoal
- Website: www.ohsu.edu
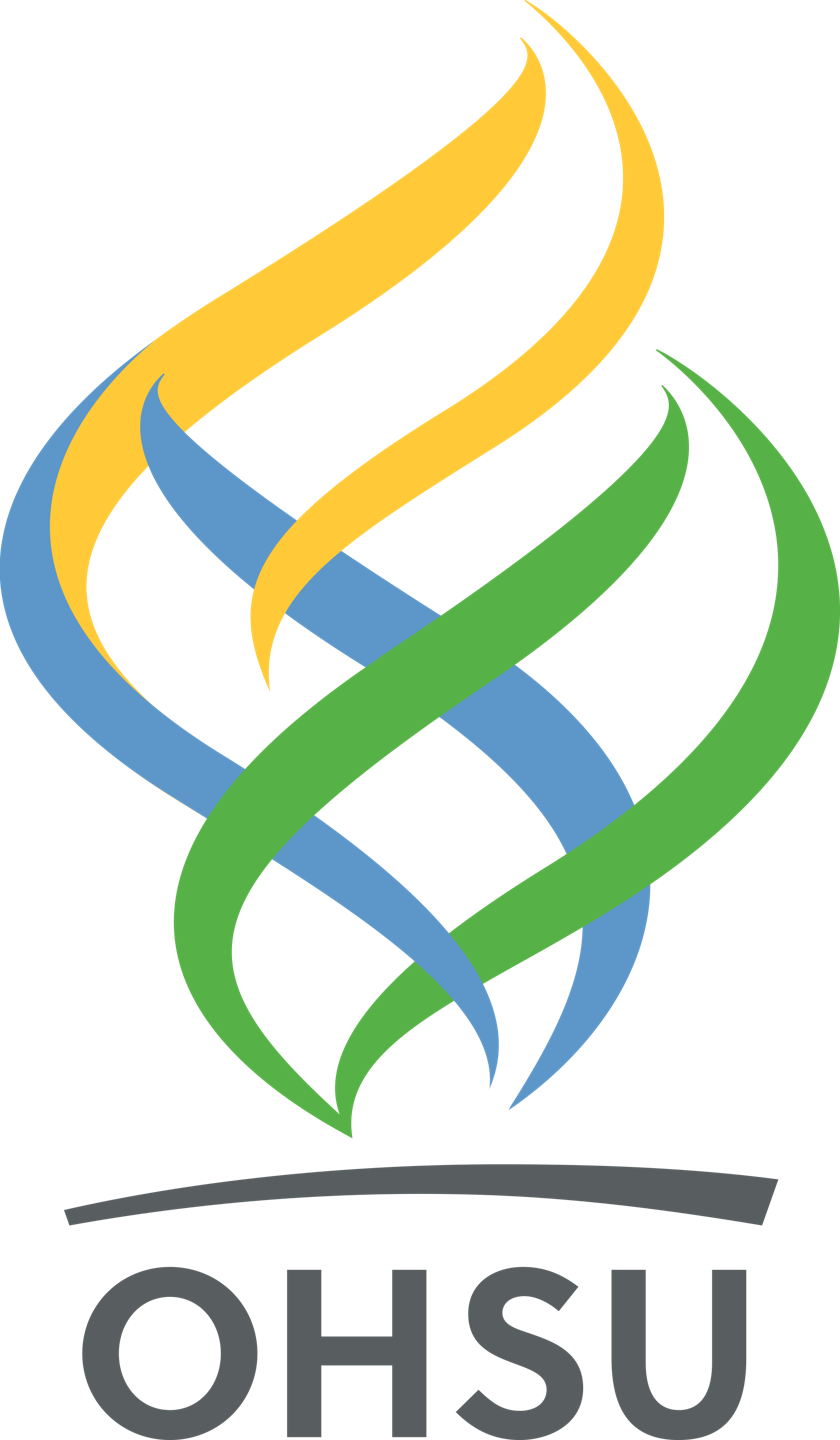

Oregon Health and Science University (OHSU) is a public research university focusing primarily on health sciences with a main campus, including two hospitals, in Portland, Oregon.

The institution was founded in 1887 as the University of Oregon Medical Department and later became the University of Oregon Medical School. In 1974, the campus became an independent, self-governed institution called the University of Oregon Health Sciences Center, combining state dentistry, medicine, nursing, and public health programs into a single center. It was renamed Oregon Health Sciences University in 1981 and took its current name in 2001, as part of a merger with the Oregon Graduate Institute (OGI), in Hillsboro. The university has several partnership programs including a joint PharmD Pharmacy program with Oregon State University in Corvallis.

It is designated as a "Special Focus – Research Institution" according to the Carnegie Classification.

== History ==
The Willamette University School of Medicine, OHSU's earliest predecessor, was founded in the 1860s in Salem, and was relocated to Portland in the 1870s. In 1915, Willamette University and the University of Oregon merged their medical programs to form the University of Oregon Medical School, and in 1919 the school moved to its present location on Marquam Hill in Southwest Portland. The Oregon-Washington Railroad and Navigation Company donated 20 acres (8.1 ha) and C.S. "Sam" Jackson, publisher of the now-defunct Oregon Journal donated the remaining 88 acres (36 ha) to the school two years prior to the move after the property had been deemed unsuitable for the construction of a railroad yard.

Over the next forty years, the school diversified its educational offerings to include nursing and dental programs, and expanded with facilities built during this time on Marquam Hill, including the Multnomah County Hospital, the Doernbecher Children's Hospital, and an outpatient clinic.

In 1955, Oregon state senator Mark Hatfield co-sponsored a bill to extend the medical school with a teaching hospital, and in 1974 the State of Oregon merged the institutions located on Marquam Hill into the University Hospital independent of the University of Oregon. Hatfield's continued support of medical research in Oregon in general and the hospital in particular was recognized by the institution in 1998 with the dedication of the Mark O. Hatfield Clinical Research Center, and the creation of the Hatfield information wall on permanent display in the lobby of the main hospital. In 2008, Governor Kulongoski released an executive order designating the Mark O. Hatfield Chair of the OHSU Board of Directors to commemorate Hatfield's commitment to the institution.

The Oregon Graduate Institute merged with OHSU in July 2001, with OGI becoming the OGI School of Science and Engineering, one of four schools within OHSU at the time. The Oregon Health Sciences University name was modified to the Oregon Health & Science University. The merger was funded in part by a $4 million grant from the M.J. Murdock Charitable Trust, earmarked to help launch a new biomedical engineering program at the School. The OGI School of Science and Engineering was renamed the Department of Science & Engineering within the School of Medicine at OHSU in 2008. OHSU vacated the OGI campus in Hillsboro in 2014, and its programs were moved to the Marquam Hill complex.

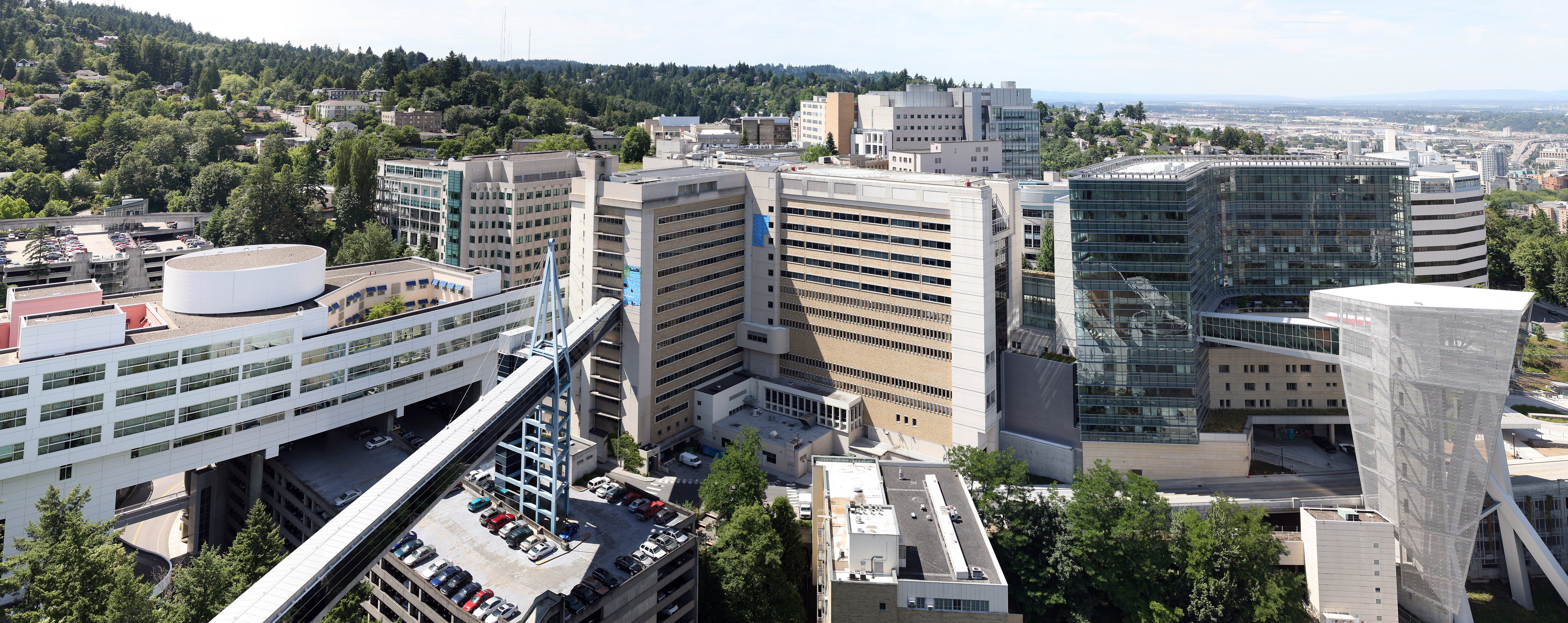
The main OHSU campus sits atop Marquam Hill

On October 29, 2008, OHSU announced its largest philanthropic gift up that time: a $100 million gift from Nike co-founder Phil Knight and his wife, Penny Knight. The gift went to the OHSU Cancer Institute, renaming it the OHSU Knight Cancer Institute. Five years later, in 2013, Knight announced his intention to donate an additional $500 million to OHSU specifically for cancer research if the university could match it over the subsequent two years. The challenge motivated Columbia Sportswear chairwoman Gert Boyle to donate $100 million in 2014. On June 25, 2015, OHSU met the $500 million matching-donations goal, and Knight met with Robin Roberts on Good Morning America that morning to announce his matching $500 million donation, bringing the total to $1 billion raised.

OHSU remained Oregon's only medical school until 2011, when College of Osteopathic Medicine of the Pacific, Northwest opened in Lebanon, Oregon.

The world's first in-vivo use of the Crispr-Cas9 DNA editing tool was conducted in 2020 at the Casey Eye Institute at OHSU. The procedure is intended to reverse a genetic mutation causing Leber congenital amaurosis, a form of inherited blindness.

OHSU explored an integration with Legacy Health to create a combined health system in August 2023. The acquisition was called off in 2025.

On October 24, 2024, president Danny Jacobs announced that he would resign from being president of OHSU for personal reasons.

On August 11, 2025, Shereef Elnahal started as the president of OHSU, replacing former president, Danny Jacobs, and the interim president, Steve Stadum.

On August 14, 2025, Phil Knight and his wife, Penny Knight, announced their pledge a $2 billion gift to the university. OHSU claims this be the largest single gift to a U.S. university, which surpasses the $1.8 billion given by Michael Bloomberg to Johns Hopkins University in 2018. The gift will help with "psychological, genetic and financial counseling, symptom management, nutritional support and survivorship care" for patients and families affected by cancer.

=== Animal welfare violations ===
The United States Department of Agriculture cited OHSU in February 2020 for animal welfare violation after five prairie voles in its lab died of thirst. The violation followed a routine inspection in January 2020. The university was also cited for practices that risked contaminating surgical tools during procedures for probing a ferret's brain with an electrode. The university's ferret research was shut down for a month in 2019 after inspectors found three violations. These violations bring the number of serious violations at the university's animal lab to nine since 2014.

== Campuses ==
The main campus, located on Marquam Hill (colloquially known as "Pill Hill") in the southwest neighborhood of Homestead, is home to the university's medical school as well as two associated hospitals. The Oregon Health & Science University Hospital is a Level I trauma center and general hospital; Doernbecher Children's Hospital is a children's hospital which specializes in pediatric medicine and care of children with long-term illness. The university maintains a number of outpatient primary care facilities including the Physician's Pavilion at the Marquam Hill campus as well as throughout the Portland metropolitan area.

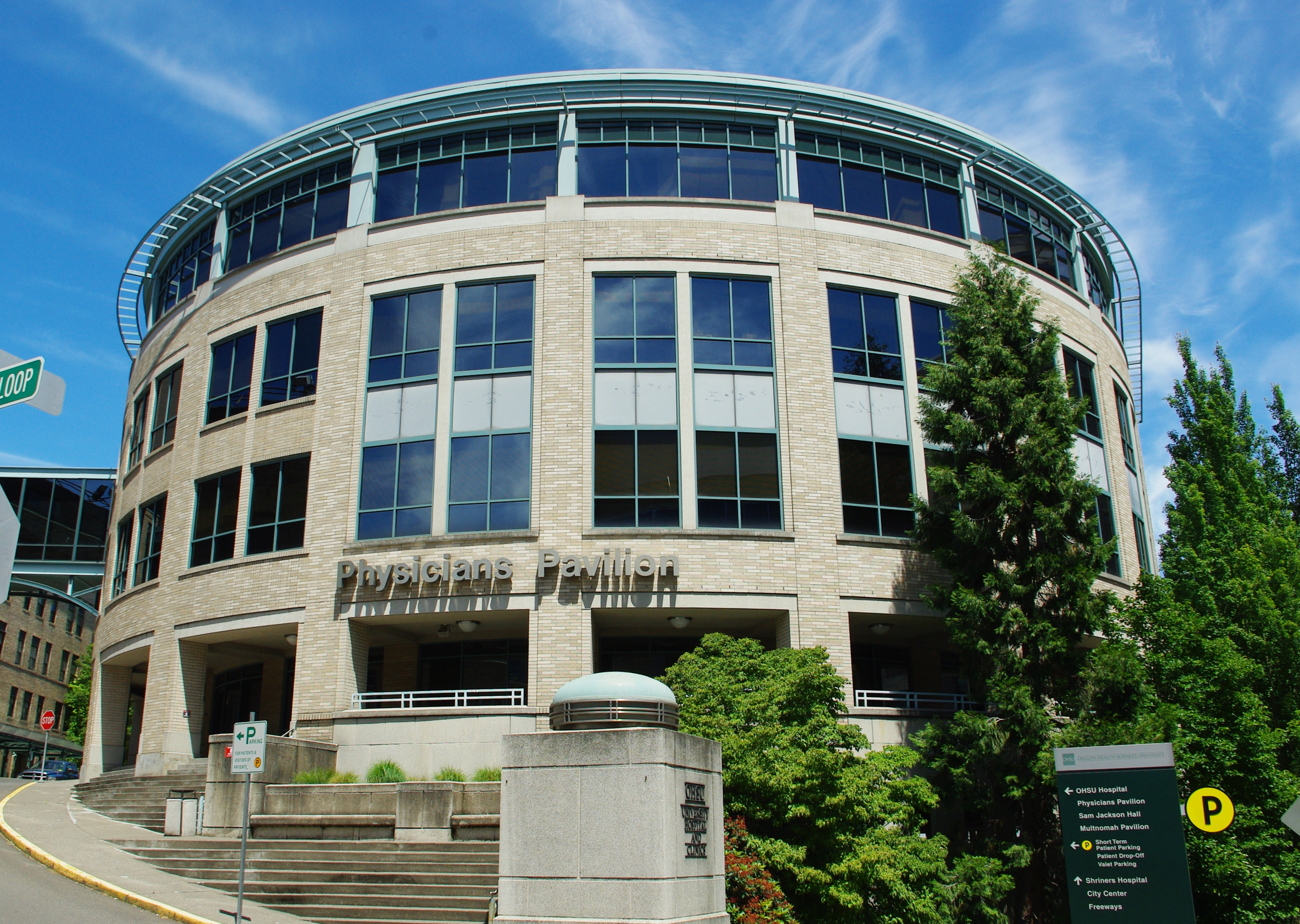
Physicians Pavilion at Marquam Hill campus

A third hospital, the Portland Veterans Affairs Medical Center is located next to the main OHSU campus; this hospital is run by the United States Department of Veterans Affairs and is outside the auspices of OHSU. A 660 feet (200 m) pedestrian skybridge connecting OHSU Hospital and the VA Medical Center was constructed in 1992.

Additionally, the Portland Shriners Hospital for Children is located on the OHSU campus. The university also had a campus in Hillsboro, at the site of the former OGI. This campus specialized in graduate-level science and engineering education and is located in the heart of Oregon's Silicon Forest. Since 1998, the university has controlled the Oregon National Primate Research Center, located adjacent to OGI in Hillsboro.

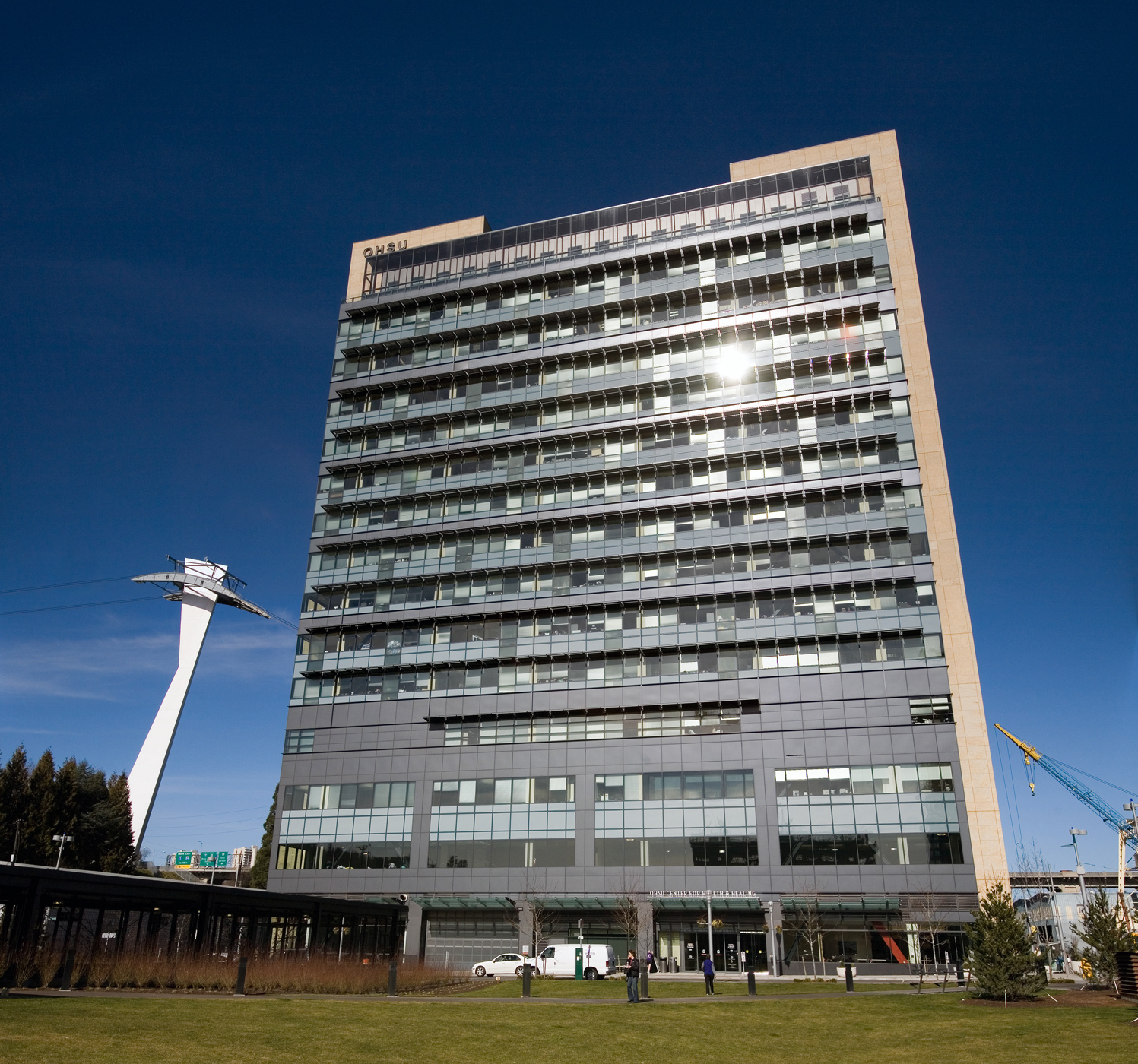
Center for Health and Healing at the South Waterfront campus

With the Marquam Hill campus running out of room for expansion, beginning in 2003 OHSU announced plans to expand into the South Waterfront District, formerly known as the North Macadam District. The expansion area is along the Willamette River in the South Portland neighborhood to the east of Marquam Hill and south of the city center. The Center for Health & Healing earned LEED Platinum certification in February 2007, becoming the largest health care center in the U.S. to achieve that status. As part of the continued expansion of the South Waterfront, on June 26, 2014, OHSU opened the Collaborative Life Sciences Building (CLSB). The building cost $295 million to construct, and houses OHSU School of Dentistry and Dental Clinics, Portland State University classes and Oregon State University's Doctor of Pharmacy program. In April, 2018, CLSB was renamed to the Joseph E. Robertson, Jr. Collaborative Life Sciences Building (RLSB). As existing surface streets were deemed insufficient to connect the South Waterfront campus to the Marquam Hill campus, the Portland Aerial Tram was built as the primary link between them and opened December 1, 2006. Controversy surrounded the costs of the tram, which nearly quadrupled from initial estimates. Construction of the tram was funded largely by OHSU ($40 million, 70%), with contributions from the city of Portland ($8.5 million, 15%) and developers and landowners in the South Portland neighborhood.

On January 8, 2008, OHSU announced that it will establish a research institute at the Florida Center for Innovation at Tradition in the Tradition community in Port St. Lucie, Florida. The institute eventually will employ 200 workers. Institute scientists will study infectious diseases of the elderly, AIDS and other infectious diseases and viruses. OHSU will work out of the adjacent Torrey Pines Institute for Molecular Studies until its own center is completed. A $117.9 million financial incentive package from the state of Florida secured OHSU's commitment.

== Academics ==
Undergraduate demographics as of Fall 2023
Race and ethnicity	Total
White	62%
Hispanic	21%
Two or more races	6%
Asian	6%
Black	3%
Native Hawaiian/Pacific Islander	1%
International student	1%
Unknown	1%
Economic diversity
Low-income (Note: The percentage of students who received an income-based federal Pell grant intended for low-income students.)	29%
Affluent (Note: The percentage of students who are a part of the American middle class at the bare minimum.)	71%

As of January 2025, OHSU's faculty morale is poor. It is ranked at the 196th place in best global universities by US News & World Report.

Academic rankings

Global
- ARWU: 201-300
- THE: 251–300

=== School of Medicine ===
The OHSU School of Medicine has a faculty of 2,480 and confers a variety of degrees, including Doctor of Medicine, Doctor of Philosophy, Master of Science, Master of Physician Assistant Studies, and Master of Public Health. In 2022, the U.S. News & World Report ranked OHSU 4th overall in Primary Care Rankings and 32nd in Research Rankings. In addition, the publication ranked the school 1st in Family Medicine. It is one of two medical schools in Oregon, and the only awarding a Doctor of Medicine degree. As of January 2026, 82% of the students are from in-state. The school receives over 6,000 applications and interviewing 543 applicants and accepting about 230. The average GPA of the entering class is 3.66 with a median MCAT score of 509. Its Physician Assistant program was ranked 21st as of January 2026 by U.S. News & World Report.

=== School of Dentistry ===
OHSU's School of Dentistry was merged into the university in 1945. Accredited through the Commission on Dental Accreditation, the school has departments in endodontics, orthodontics, pathology and radiology, oral and maxillofacial surgery, periodontics, and pediatric dentistry, among others. The D.M.D. program admits 75 students each year. In 2014, the School of Dentistry program moved to the Collaborative Life Sciences Building on Portland's South Waterfront along with the School of Medicine.

=== School of Nursing ===
The School of Nursing at OHSU offers nursing programs at the undergraduate, graduate, and doctoral levels. The graduate nursing program was most recently ranked 36th overall in the nation by the U.S. News & World Report.

== OHSU Foundation ==
The Oregon Health & Science University Foundation is a 501(c)(3) organization that exists to advance OHSU's mission through philanthropy. The Doernbecher Children's Hospital Foundation merged with the OHSU Foundation in 2021.

== Controversies ==
=== Aerial tram ===
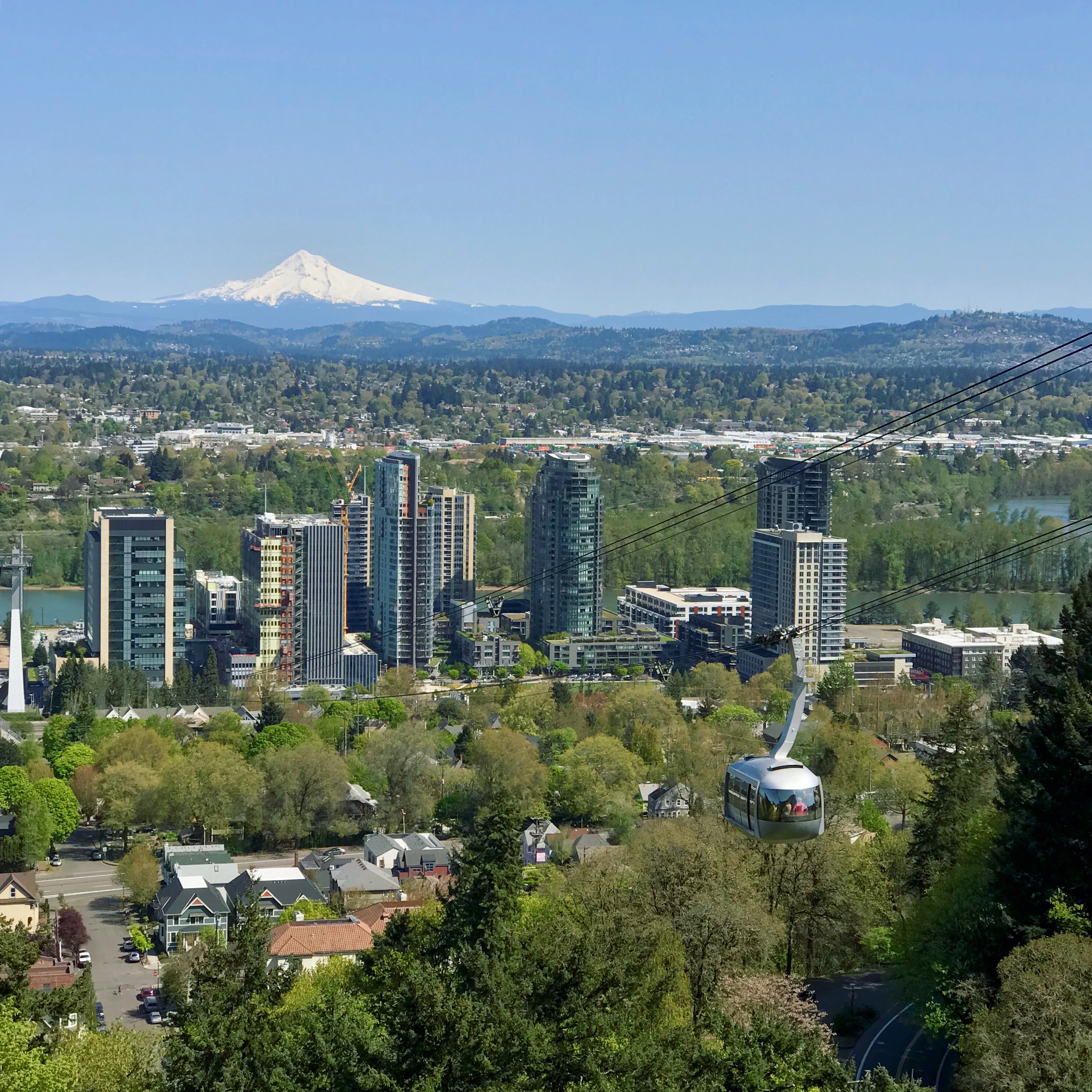
Portland Aerial Tram from Marquam Hill

In 2001, OHSU purchased property in what is now known as the South Waterfront neighborhood with intentions to expand its facilities there. After the purchase, OHSU began developing plans with the Portland Office of Transportation to connect this location to its Marquam Hill facilities by way of an aerial tram. Before construction of the tram began in 2005, the project was criticized by residents in the neighborhoods located directly below the projected tram route who believed its construction would result in an invasion of privacy and lower property values. The group No Tram to OHSU argued that OHSU had not sufficiently justified the benefits of the tram, that the tram would not alleviate traffic congestion on Marquam Hill as OHSU claimed, and that the project inappropriately made use of public right of way for private purposes. During the construction phase, the project came under additional public scrutiny amid rising construction and operation costs. The final cost of its construction was $57 million, almost 4 times over its original projected budget. After opening in December 2006, the tram carried its one millionth passenger on October 17, 2007, and its ten millionth rider on January 8, 2014.

=== PETA ===
In 2006, the animal rights group PETA brought attention to OHSU research involving sheep. The research, which was being conducted in conjunction with Oregon State University was designed to understand the biological mechanisms involved in sexual partner preference.

== Notable alumni and faculty ==
- Esther Choo, emergency physician and president of the Academy of Women in Academic Emergency Medicine
- Mustafa Culha, chemistry professor and research group founder
- Charles Theodore Dotter, physician and radiologist credited with the development of interventional radiology as a new specialty. Considered the "Father of Interventional Radiology"
- Brian Druker, physician and co-developer of Gleevec and director of the Knight Cancer Institute
- John Epley, physician and developer of the Epley maneuver
- Suzanne Fei, computational biologist, Bioinformatics & Biostatistics Core Director
- Catherine G Galbraith, expert in cell migration and super-resolution microscopy
- N. Gregory Hamilton, psychiatrist
- Alan L. Hart, radiologist, tuberculosis researcher, writer, and the first trans men in the United States to undergo a hysterectomy
- Matthew Keeslar, physician assistant instructor of urology, School of Medicine; former professional actor (Waiting for Guffman, Scream 3, Frank Herbert's Dune)
- Lena Kenin, OB/GYN and psychiatrist
- John Kitzhaber, physician and longest-serving governor in Oregon's history
- Muriel Lezak, neuropsychologist and author
- Owen McCarty, Chair of the Department of Biomedical Engineering
- Bita Moghaddam, Ruth Matarazzo Professor of Behavioral Neuroscience, author
- Bud Pierce, physician and politician
- Lendon Smith, OB/GYN, pediatrician, author, and television personality
- Albert Starr, first surgeon to implant a heart valve successfully
- Kent L. Thornburg, scientist, researcher, professor
- Wendy F. K’ah Skaahluwaa Todd (née Smythe) geomicrobiologist pairing Western science with traditional ecological knowledge
- Shoshana R. Ungerleider, Internal Medicine Physician, film producer
- Melissa Wong, cancer stem cell biologist
- D. George Wyse, expert in cardiac arrhythmias

== See also ==
- Art collection of Oregon Health & Science University
- Marquam Nature Park
