= Mountain Hardwear =

American outdoor apparel company

- Company type: Subsidiary
- Industry: Textiles
- Founded: 1993; 33 years ago, Berkeley, California, United States
- Headquarters: Richmond, California
- Key people: Troy Sicotte, President Jack Gilbert, Founder
- Products: Outerwear, sportswear
- Net income: $101.6 million (2017)
- Parent: Columbia Sportswear
- Website: mountainhardwear.com

Mountain Hardwear is a subsidiary of Columbia Sportswear, based in Richmond, California, that makes apparel, accessories and gear for mountaineering enthusiasts and outdoor athletes, as well as for consumers who are inspired by the outdoor lifestyle.

== History ==
Mountain Hardwear was founded in 1993 in Richmond, California, by a small group of former employees of Sierra Designs led by Jack Gilbert. Soon after, Mountain Hardwear's first sponsored athlete, Ed Viesturs, the first American to climb all fourteen 8,000 meter peaks, helped develop several of the company's products.

== Sponsored athletes ==
Mountain Hardwear sponsors a number of athletes. Most are alpinists, climbers, or skiers.

== Community Initiatives ==
Since 2020, Mountain Hardwear has hosted the annual Open Aperture Photo Clinic, a program designed to help underrepresented voices in outdoor photography. The multi-day clinic offers mentorship, workshops, and field experiences led by professional photographers and athletes. In 2022, the event was held in Washington's Cascade Mountains.
