= Owen McCarty =

American biomedical engineer

- Education: University of Buffalo; Johns Hopkins University
- Website: https://www.ohsu.edu/people/owen-jt-mccarty-phd-faha

Owen McCarty is an American biomedical engineer who studies the dynamics of the vascular system in the context of cancer metastasis, cardiovascular disease, and inflammation. He is the Douglas Strain Professor and Chair of the Biomedical Engineering Department at Oregon Health & Science University (OHSU) and a fellow of the American Heart Association.

== Education and career ==
McCarty received his B.S. in Chemical Engineering from SUNY-Buffalo. He attended Johns Hopkins University to pursue his Ph.D. with Konstantinos Konstantopoulos and investigate tumor cell receptors for white blood cells and platelets. He completed his post-doctoral training under the mentorship of Steve Watson as a Wellcome Trust Fellow in the Pharmacology Department at the University of Oxford and University of Birmingham. In 2005, he accepted a faculty position in the Department of Biomedical Engineering at Oregon Health & Science University. He has served as chair of the Biomedical Engineering Department since 2019 and orchestrated collaborative partnerships with OHSU's School of Medicine, School of Dentistry, and external institutions.

== Current work and achievements ==
McCarty investigates fluid mechanics and cellular biology of the vasculature with the goal of translating these insights into molecular-targeted therapies. His research program has helped take two drug candidates to clinical trials and has also provided insight on the anti-cancer effects of aspirin.

== Honors and awards ==
- 2002: Howard & Jacqueline Chertkof Endowed Fellowship, Johns Hopkins University
- 2003: University Merit Review Award, University of Oxford
- 2004 British Journal of Haematology Research Trust Award
- 2004: Paper of the Year in the Platelets Section of the Journal of Thrombosis and Haemostasis
- 2004: International Society on Thrombosis and Haemostasis Young Investigator Award
- 2005: Gordon Research Conference Speaker Award
- 2007: Paper of the Year in the Platelets Section of the Journal of Thrombosis and Haemostasis
- 2009: American Heart Association Karl Link New Investigator Award in Thrombosis
- 2010: American Heart Association Kenneth M. Brinkhous Young Investigator in Thrombosis Finalist
- 2013: American Heart Association Established Investigator Award
- 2014: Fellow of the American Heart Association
- 2019: Best Basic Science Award at the International Sepsis Forum
- 2021: Douglas Strain Endowed Professorship, OHSU Department of Biomedical Engineering

== Publications ==
- McCarty, O. J., Mousa, S. A., Bray, P. F., & Konstantopoulos, K. (2000). Immobilized platelets support human colon carcinoma cell tethering, rolling, and firm adhesion under dynamic flow conditions. Blood, The Journal of the American Society of Hematology, 96(5), 1789-1797.
- McCarty, O. J., Larson, M. K., Auger, J. M., Kalia, N., Atkinson, B. T., Pearce, A. C., ... & Watson, S. P. (2005). Rac1 is essential for platelet lamellipodia formation and aggregate stability under flow. Journal of biological chemistry, 280(47), 39474-39484.
- Cheng, Q., Tucker, E. I., Pine, M. S., Sisler, I., Matafonov, A., Sun, M. F., ... McCarty, O. J. T., ... & Gailani, D. (2010). A role for factor XIIa–mediated factor XI activation in thrombus formation in vivo. Blood, The Journal of the American Society of Hematology, 116(19), 3981-3989.
- Aslan, J. E., & McCarty, O. J. (2013). Rho GTPases in platelet function. Journal of Thrombosis and Haemostasis, 11(1), 35-46.
- Itakura, A., & McCarty, O. J. (2013). Pivotal role for the mTOR pathway in the formation of neutrophil extracellular traps via regulation of autophagy. American Journal of Physiology. Cell Physiology, 305(3), C348-C354.
