= Columbia Montrail =

Sub-brand of Columbia Sportswear

- Industry: Clothing
- Predecessor: One Sport; Montrail
- Founded: 1982
- Headquarters: Washington County, Oregon (near Beaverton, Oregon), United States; 45.52938°N 122.82535°W
- Products: Athletic footwear
- Parent: Columbia Sportswear
- Website: www.columbia.com/montrail/

Columbia Montrail is a sub-brand of Columbia Sportswear that manufactures and distributes shoes for trail running, hiking, and general long-distance running.

== History ==
The company was originally called Brenco Enterprises with a line of boots called One Sport. Enthusiastic outdoorsman Menno van Wyck liked their boots so much that he bought the One Sport line from Brenco Enterprises in 1993. As chief executive officer, Van Eyck expanded the line of boots.

In 1997, it was rebranded as Montrail. The same year, their hiking boot Moraine was rated Best Hiking Boot in Backpacker Magazine.

In 1999, Montrail patented stretchable Gore-Tex in the Java GTX shoe. In 2002, it created the first "shoftshell" shoe made with Schoeller fabric. In 2004 "Gryptonite" ultra-sticky rubber was introduced, and in 2005 PRFRM thermo-moldable foam was introduced in the Molokai and Molokini flip flops, Enduro-Soles, and rock climbing shoes; Gryptonite rubber was extended to trail running shoes; Hardrock was introduced.

In 2006, Montrail was acquired by Columbia Sportswear for a cash payment of $15 million plus the assumption of certain liabilities. Columbia Sportwear had wanted to expand from selling winter coats and apparel. Montrail's employees relocated to Portland within the year. Columbia continued to use the Montrail brand until, in 2017, it discontinued the Montrail brand and sub-branded it as Columbia Montrail.

== Awards and recognition ==
- 2003 — Excelerace XCR won Editor's Choice in Backpacker Magazine and the D7 earns Editor's Choice in Climbing Magazine.
- 2005 — Hardrock won awards in Health Magazine and Outside Magazine
- 2006 — Continental Divide wins Best Trail Shoe Debut by Runner's World Magazine and Editor's Choice by TrailRunner Magazine.
- 2007 — Namche was named Best Fastpacking Boot and the Java XCR is named Most Supportive Ultralight Boot by Backpacker Magazine.

== Sponsorships ==
The company has sponsored ultrarunning athletes, rock climbers, and related events in the United States since 1996, and now supports 88 athletes. It also hosts and sponsors ultrarunning and trail running events in the United States. The Montrail Ultra Cup is a series of six ultrarunning events, culminating at the Western States Endurance Run, a 100-mile ultramarathon.
