= Kent L. Thornburg =

American scientist

Kent L. Thornburg is an American scientist, researcher and professor. He resides in Portland, Oregon and works at Oregon Health & Science University (OHSU), in the School of Medicine. He is the founding director for both the OHSU Center for Developmental Health and the Moore Institute for Nutrition & Wellness.

== Developmental Origins of Health and Disease ==
Thornburg uses a broad range of scientific disciplines to investigate how maternal stressors before, during and after pregnancy affect the risk for the offspring acquiring chronic diseases later in life. This field of research is known as the Developmental Origins of Health and Disease (DOHaD).

== Current research (2020) ==
Thornburg's research includes cardiac and pulmonary (lung) physiology, placentology, and developmental programming - as well as epigenetics and epidemiology. He studies the ways in which the fetus adapts to a variety of stressors during pregnancy, including psychosocial and nutritional stress.

== Education ==
In 1967, Kent Thornburg graduated with an undergraduate degree in Biology from George Fox University. He continued his studies at Oregon State University, obtaining a master’s degree in Zoology in 1970, and a Doctorate of Philosophy in Developmental Physiology and Embryology in 1972.

== Academic positions ==
Thornburg is currently Professor Emeritus at Oregon Health & Science University.

In 1993, Thornburg formed the OHSU Heart Research Center, to coordinate all the cardiac-related research happening across OHSU, to encourage cross-disciplinary cardiac research and to share that research with the community. In 2013 upon the establishment of the Knight Cardiovascular Institute by a gift from Phil and Penny Knight, the center was renamed as the Center for Developmental Health to align with Dr. Thornburg’s research.

In 2012, Thornburg became the founding director of the Bob and Charlee Moore Institute for Nutrition & Wellness. This came after a $25 million pledge from Bob and Charlee Moore from Bob’s Red Mill to aid in the creation of an institute that could dedicate itself to translating the DOHaD research taking place at OHSU.

In 2021, Thornburg was appointed the interim director of Knight Cardiovascular Institute. In this position, he focused on bringing together researchers and clinicians across the institute following the pandemic and leadership changes.

In 2023 Dr. Kent Thornburg formally announced his retirement, stepping back from his director’s capacities and staying at OHSU as Professor Emeritus.

== Post-Retirement ==
Since his retirement, Thornburg continues to focus on his research, continuing to collaborate with other researchers at OHSU and the Moore Institute. In 2025, Thornburg formally announced his involvement in the creation of a documentary, “The 100 Year Effect”. Focused on the DOHaD research that Thornburg had focused on for the majority of his career, the film features Thornburg as one of multiple personalities the film focuses on to illustrate the need to address the growing number of communities with chronic diseases, and the multi-generational effect nutrition has on them.
