= Prana (brand) =

American clothing company

prAna
- Type: Subsidiary
- Industry: Clothing
- Founded: 1992; 34 years ago in Carlsbad, California, US
- Founder: Beaver Theodosakis; Pam Theodosakis
- Headquarters: Carlsbad, California, US
- Products: Activewear
- Revenue: US$157.0 million (2018)
- Parent: Columbia Sportswear
- Website: prana.com

Prana (stylized as prAna) is an American clothing company based in Carlsbad, California. Prana is a subsidiary of Columbia Sportswear.

== History ==
Prana was started in a garage in Carlsbad, California, in 1992 by Beaver and Pam Theodosakis. They wished to make sustainably made clothes and set about sewing the pieces themselves. The company grew and was acquired in 2014 by Columbia Sportswear for $190 million. Prana's mission is "to celebrate the spirit of adventure and discovery, encouraging individuals to pursue their passions inspired by an active California lifestyle."
