= Mustafa Culha =

Dr. Mustafa Culha (Çulha) is as of 2026, a professor at the Department of Chemistry and Biochemistry of Augusta University, GA, USA.
