= Harry Goldblatt =

- Born: March 14, 1891; Iowa
- Died: January 6, 1977 (aged 85)
- Education: McGill University
- Children: 2
- Scientific career
- Workplaces: Western Reserve University; Mount Sinai Hospital

Harry Goldblatt (March 14, 1891 – January 6, 1977) was an American pathologist best known for his discovery of the role of kidneys in regulating blood pressure.

== Biography ==
Goldblatt was born March 14, 1891, in Iowa to Phillip and Jennie Spitz Goldblatt.

Goldblatt graduated from McGill University with a B.A. in 1912 and an M.D. degree in 1916. He then served at Royal Victoria Hospital, Montreal and as a member of the Medical Reserve Corps of the United States Army, before doing a residency at Lakeside Hospital in Cleveland, Ohio. He studied pathology and surgery at the Lister Institute of Preventative Medicine and University College London.

From 1924 to 1946, he was a professor of pathology at Western Reserve University. He then was the director of the Institute for Medical Research Cedars of Lebanon Hospital in Los Angeles, before returning to Cleveland in 1953 to work at Mount Sinai Hospital.

Goldblatt married Jeanne Rea on June 25, 1929, and had two sons, both doctors.

He retired in 1976 and died of pulmonary edema in 1977.

== Research ==
As a pathologist, Goldblatt had observed narrowing of renal blood vessels in autopsies of people with hypertension. He hypothesized that decreased blood flow to the kidneys could have a role in increasing blood pressure. To test this, he partially clamped shut the renal arteries in dogs to decrease the blood flow, and observed a rise in blood pressure in response. He published these findings in 1934. In later years, it was discovered that the lack of blood flow to the kidneys causes a release of renin, triggering vasoconstriction and a corresponding increase in blood pressure.

Because of his contributions, the World Health Organization has designated "Goldblatt units" as the standard unit of measure of renin.

== Honors ==
In 1973, Goldblatt was inducted into the National Academy of Sciences. And in 1976, he received the Scientific Achievement Award of the American Medical Association.

The American Heart Association has established the Harry Goldblatt Award in Cardiovascular Research.
