= Tim Boyle (businessman) =

American businessman (born 1949)

Timothy Boyle
- Born: 1949 (age 76–77); Portland, Oregon, US
- Education: Jesuit High School; University of Oregon
- Occupation: Businessman
- Title: Chairman and CEO, Columbia Sportswear
- Term: 1988-
- Spouse: Mary Boyle
- Children: 2
- Parent(s): Gert Lammfromm Boyle; Joseph Cornelius "Neal" Boyle

Timothy P. Boyle (born 1949) is an American billionaire, and the chairman and CEO of Columbia Sportswear.

According to Forbes, his estimated net worth was US$1.9 billion in July 2026.

== Early life and education ==
Boyle was born and raised in Portland, Oregon. He is one of three children of Joseph Cornelius "Neal" Boyle, an Irish Catholic, and Gertrude Lamfrom. His mother was Jewish and fled as a teenager from Nazi Germany. She immigrated to Portland, Oregon, and converted to Catholicism after marriage. He has two sisters.

His grandfather, Paul Lamfrom, purchased the Rosenfeld Hat Company and changed its name to the Columbia Hat Company (after the river). His father became president of Columbia Hat after his grandfather died and then diversified the hat business into outerwear for hunters, fishermen, and skiers. In 1960 the name of the company was changed to Columbia Sportswear.

Boyle was educated at Jesuit High School, in Beaverton, Oregon, just outside of Portland, followed by the University of Oregon where he earned a bachelor's degree in journalism in 1971.

== Career ==
Boyle was still at university when his father died suddenly in 1970 at the age of 47. He left to join his mother, who had become president of Columbia Hat. At that time, the company was earning $800,000 in annual sales and had 40 employees. The company struggled and teetered on bankruptcy until Boyle and his mother refocused the business on outdoor clothing and casual wear in the 1970s which, paralleled a general trend away from formal work attire. In 1975, they were the first company to introduce Gore-Tex parkas.

In 1986, Columbia released the Bugaboo, a jacket with a zip out lining which became quite trendy and further propelled the company's growth. Columbia was unique among specialty clothing manufacturers in that it would sell its products to any retail shop or chain. In 1987, Columbia had $18.8 million in sales and by 1997 it had grown to $353.5 million. Boyle took over from his mother, Gert, as company president in 1988.

The company went public in 1998. In the early 2010s, Boyle refocused Columbia away from top line products and more towards the mid-range, moderately priced products; he also continued to align sales with changes happening in the retail industry, shifting the company more toward internet sales.

Columbia grew into a $6.5bn public company, and in 2013, Boyle's 41% ownership interest in Columbia Sportswear was worth over $1.0 billion.

In 2015, Boyle stepped down as president of Columbia Sportswear, but continued as CEO. He resumed the role of president in May 2017.

In 2020, Forbes ranked Boyle No. 378 on the Forbes 400 list of the richest people in America.

== Personal life ==
Boyle and his wife Mary have a son, Joseph Boyle, educated at Drake University in Des Moines, and a daughter, educated at the University of Washington. In 2025, Joseph was named as copresident of Columbia Sportswear. They live in Portland, Oregon.

== Philanthropy ==
In 2007, Boyle and his wife Mary donated $5 million to the University of Oregon. In 2016, he donated $10 million to the university's aquatic animal care facility. In 2019, the couple donated $10 million towards a biomedical data science initiative. In 2020, due to the COVID-19 pandemic, Boyle reduced his own salary to $10,000 while maintaining the full salary and benefits of all his company's retail employees.

In 2025, Boyle donated $10 million to University of Oregon for research including fish breeding and zebrafish genomics research.
