= Knight Cancer Institute =

American research institute

The OHSU Knight Cancer Institute (previously the OHSU Cancer Institute) is a research institute within Oregon Health & Science University. The National Cancer Institute (NCI) designated cancer center is led by director Tom Sellers. It is the only NCI-designated Comprehensive Cancer Center in the state of Oregon. The institute is named after Phil Knight and his wife, who donated over $600 million to the center; $100 million in 2008 and $500 million in 2013. The $500 million gift required a matching $500 million, which led to a $100 million donation by Columbia Sportswear chairwoman Gert Boyle in 2014.

== History ==
The institute was first designated as a NCI Designated Cancer Center in 1997 and was awarded the status of comprehensive cancer center in 2017. Brian Druker was named the director of the then OHSU Cancer Institute in 2007. Tom Sellers took over as director in 2024 when Druker assumed the CEO role. In January 2026, Joel Helmke became the new CEO of the Knight Cancer Group.

== Research areas ==
The Knight Cancer Institute employs over 200 investigators who are affiliated with one of four Cancer Research Programs: Cancer Biology, Cancer Prevention and Control, Quantitative Oncology, and Translational Oncology. The Cancer Biology program focuses on tumorigenesis, signal transduction, and the tumor microenvironment. It is led by researchers Mara Sherman and Melissa Wong. Susan Flocke and Kerri Winters-Stone lead the Cancer Prevention and Control research program, which explores cancer prevention and risk reduction, screening and early detection, and survivorship. The Quantitative Oncology program focuses on technology development, molecular characterization, and systems biology. The fourth research program, Translational Oncology, has themes of target validation and high-impact interventions. This program is led by Lara Davis and Jeffrey Tyner.
