= Moonstruck Chocolate =

American chocolate company

- Founded: 1993; 32 years ago
- Website: moonstruckchocolate.com

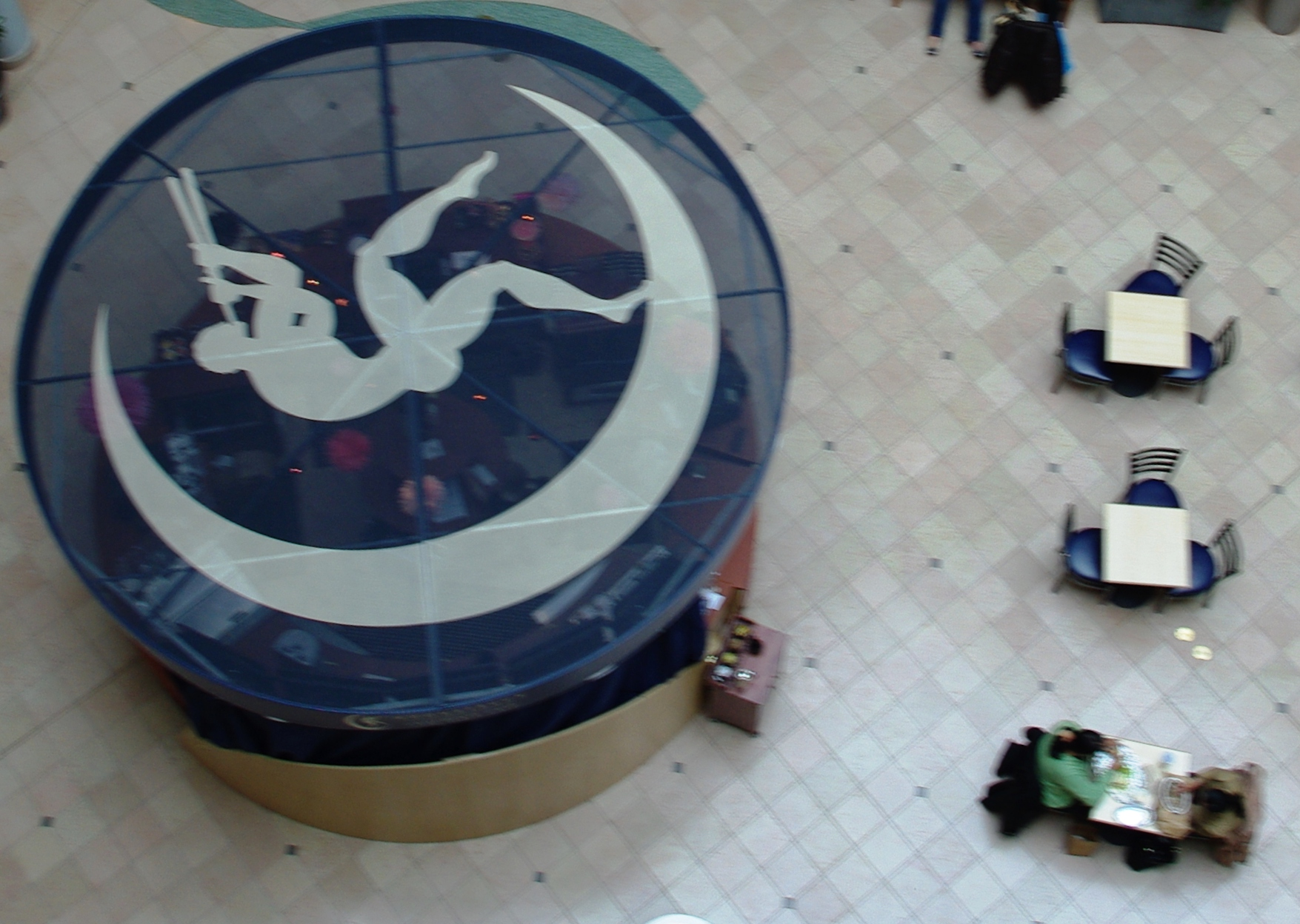
View of a Moonstruck Chocolate booth from above at Pioneer Place in Portland, Oregon, 2010

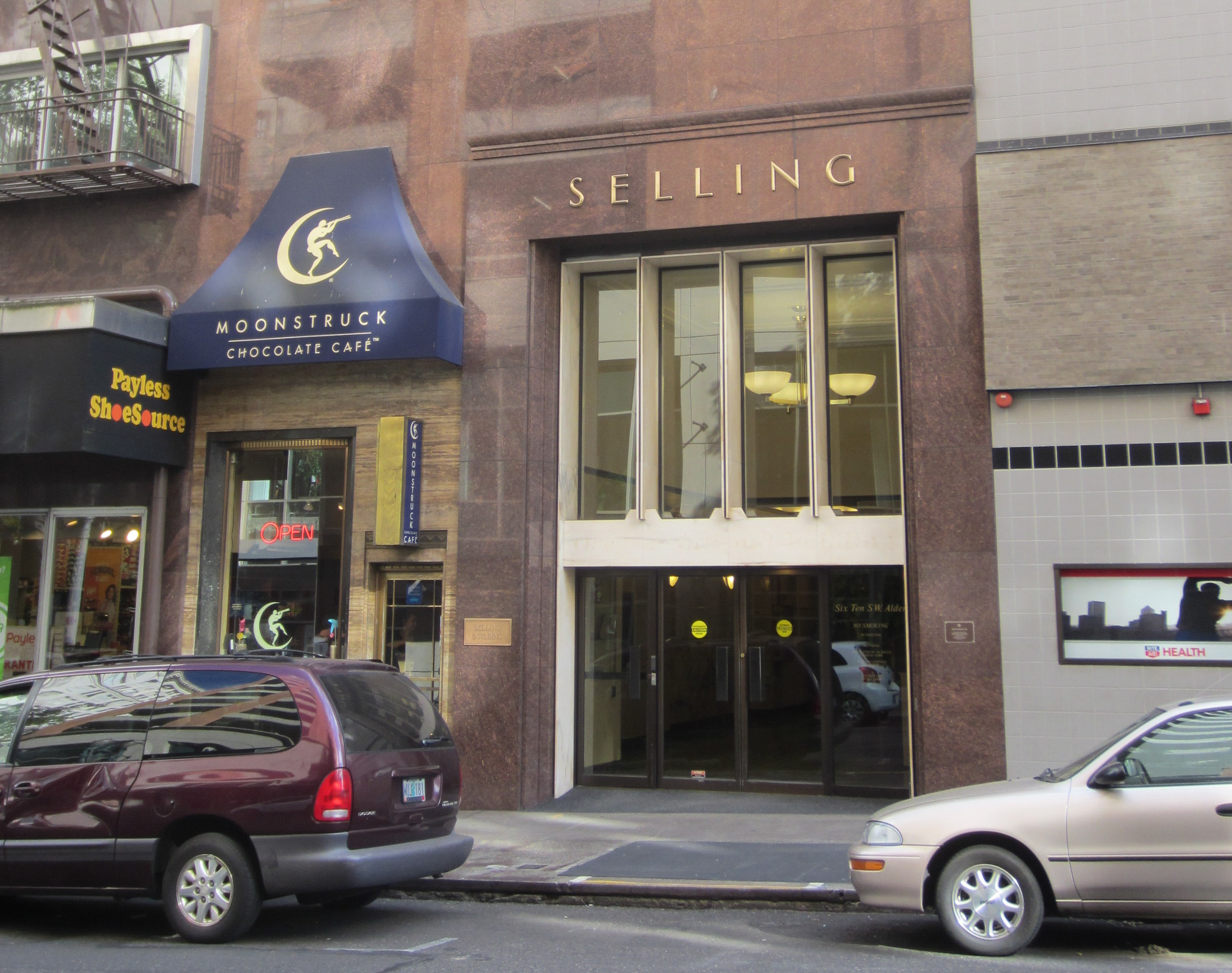
Shop in the Selling Building in 2012

Moonstruck Chocolate is a chocolate company based in Portland, Oregon, United States.

== Description and history ==
The business was established in 1993 and has operated cafes that serve coffee and chocolate drinks, including hot chocolate and milkshakes, as well as cakes, pastries and other desserts. Moonstruck has operated at Pioneer Place, in northwest Portland, and in the St. Johns neighborhood.

== Reception ==
Moonstruck won in the Best Chocolatier category of Willamette Week's annual 'Best of Portland' readers' poll in 2015, 2016, 2017, 2018, and 2020. The business ranked second in the poll's Best Sweet Shop / Chocolatier category in 2024.

== See also ==
- List of companies based in Oregon
