= Selling Building =

Historic building in Portland, Oregon, U.S.

- U.S. National Register of Historic Places
- Portland Historic Landmark
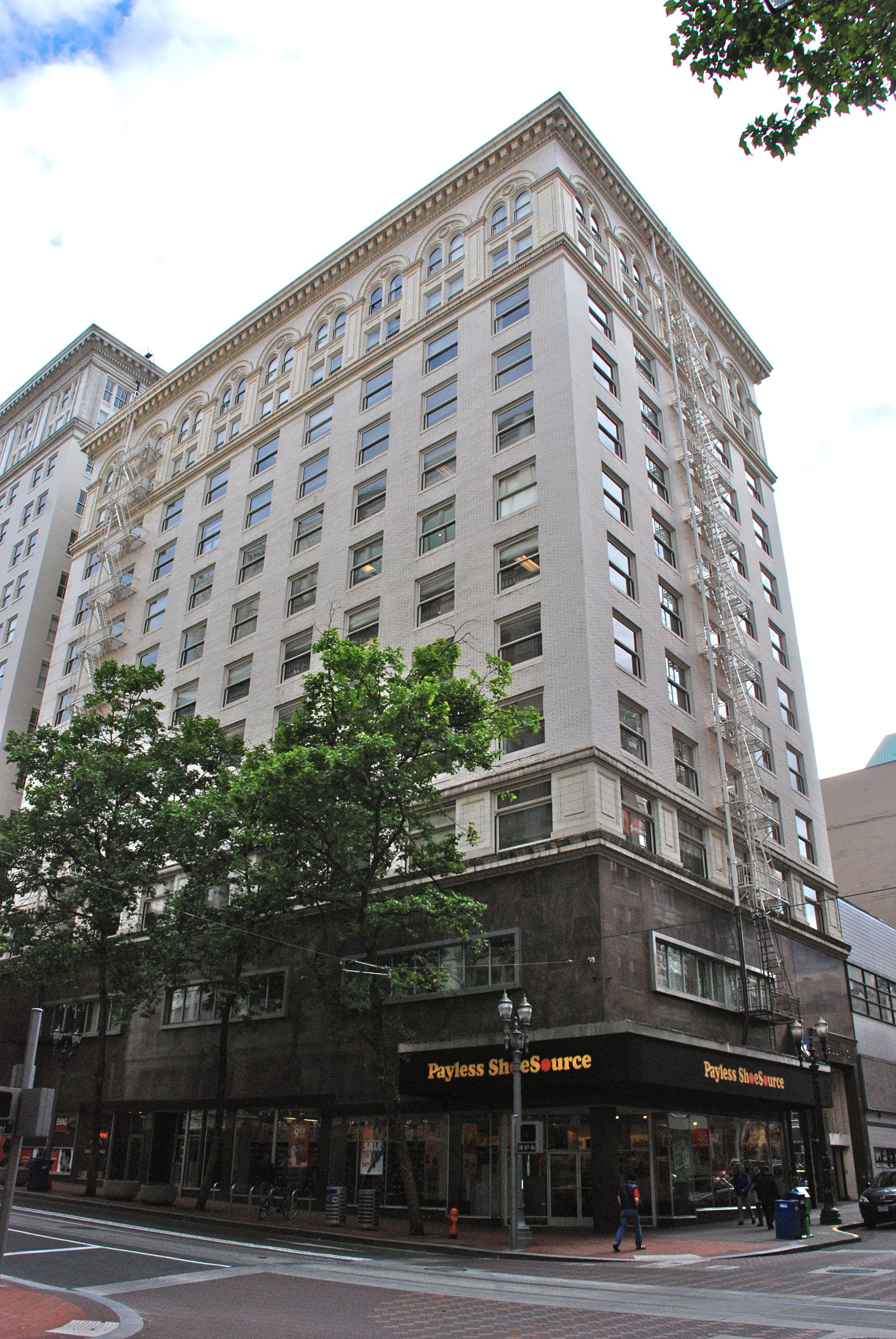
- The building's exterior in 2011

- Location within Portland, Oregon Location within Oregon Location within the United States
- Location: 610 Southwest Alder Street; Portland, Oregon
- Coordinates: 45°31′10″N 122°40′43″W
- Area: 0.2 acres (0.081 ha)
- Built: 1910
- Architect: Doyle & Patterson
- Architectural style: Chicago, Commercial Style, Late 19th and 20th Century Revivals
- NRHP reference No.: 91001554
- Added to NRHP: October 17, 1991

The Selling Building, also known as the Oregon National Building, is a building located in downtown Portland, Oregon, listed on the National Register of Historic Places.

== History ==
The structure was built in 1910 for Ben Selling & Associates, composed of Ben Selling and partners Charles Moore and Moses Blum.

In 1967, when the Oregon National Life Company became a new, major tenant, the Selling Building was renamed the Oregon National Building.

The Selling Building is owned and managed by Schlesinger Companies.

== See also ==
- National Register of Historic Places listings in Southwest Portland, Oregon
