= Brian Druker =

American physician-scientist

Brian J. Druker, M.D.
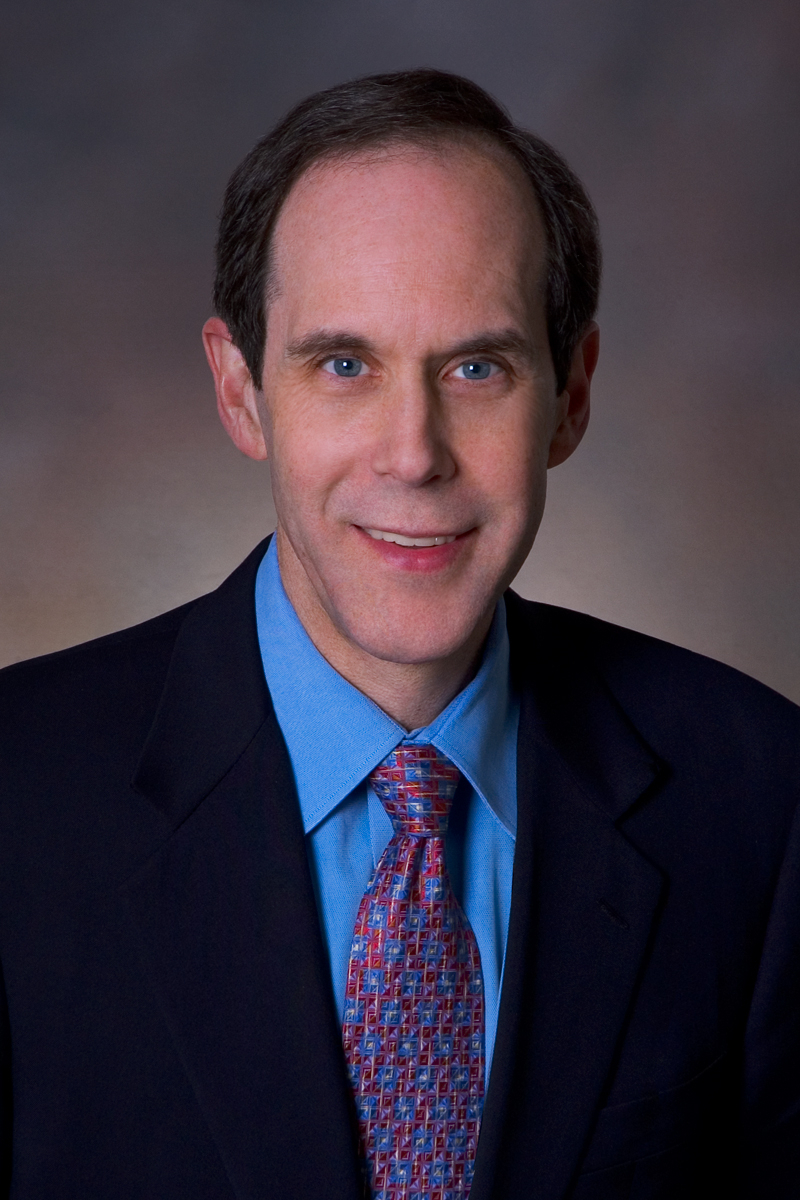
- Born: April 30, 1955 (age 71); St. Paul, Minnesota, US
- Education: University of California, San Diego, Washington University School of Medicine
- Known for: Gleevec
- Awards: Novartis-Drew Award (2002); Robert Koch Prize (2005); Keio Medical Science Prize (2007); Meyenburg Award (2009); Lasker Clinical Award (2009); Japan Prize (2012); Dickson Prize (2012); Albany Medical Center Prize (2013); Sheikh Hamdan bin Rashid Al Maktoum Award for Medical Sciences (2013–14); Tang Prize (2018); The Sjöberg Prize (2019); Stanford Drug Discovery Program Lifetime Achievement Award (2023)
- Scientific career
- Fields: Oncology
- Workplaces: Howard Hughes Medical Institute, Oregon Health & Science University

Brian J. Druker, M.D. (born April 30, 1955) is an American physician-scientist and JELD-WEN Chair of Leukemia Research at Oregon Health & Science University (OHSU) in Portland, Oregon. In 2025, he was named the inaugural president of the newly independent Knight Cancer Group, a self-governing entity formed by the Oregon Health & Science University's Knight Cancer Institute following a record $2 billion gift from Phil and Penny Knight. He previously was chief executive officer and director of OHSU's Knight Cancer Institute, as well as associate dean for Oncology in the OHSU School of Medicine.

Druker helped develop imatinib (Gleevec), the first medication that specifically targets cancer cells, for the treatment of chronic myeloid leukemia (CML). In 2001, Gleevec gained FDA approval in record time and was on the cover of Time magazine. Druker’s work launched the era of precision cancer medicine, setting the stage for future discoveries in the quest to end cancer.

He is the recipient of the 2009 Lasker-DeBakey Clinical Medical Research Award, the 2012 Japan Prize in Healthcare and Medical Technology, the 2013 Albany Medical Center Prize in Medicine and Biomedical Research, and the 2019 Sjöberg Prize, among others. He has been called "Oregon's best-known scientist".

== Education ==
Druker earned both a B.A. degree in chemistry and an M.D. degree from the University of California, San Diego. He completed his internship and residency in internal medicine at Barnes Hospital, Washington University School of Medicine in St. Louis from 1981 to 1984.

== Research and Leadership ==
Druker was a fellow in medical oncology at Dana–Farber Cancer Institute at Harvard Medical School from 1984 to 1987. He began working at Oregon Health & Science University (OHSU) in 1993.

Druker's research is focused on translating the knowledge of the molecular pathogenesis of cancer into specific therapies and investigating the optimal use of these molecularly targeted agents. He performed preclinical studies that led to the development of imatinib (Gleevec) for chronic myeloid leukemia (CML) and then spearheaded the highly successful clinical trials of imatinib, which led to FDA approval of the drug in record time. This work changed the life expectancy of patients with CML from an average of 3 to 5 years to a 89% five-year survival, and has resulted in a paradigm-shift in cancer treatment from non-specific chemotherapy to highly targeted therapeutic agents. Druker has been widely recognized for his work in developing Gleevec, but has been publicly critical of the drug's high price for patients.

Druker also helped lead a national clinical trial to find effective treatments for acute myeloid leukemia (AML). The Beat AML clinical trial, sponsored by the Leukemia & Lymphoma Society (LLS), is a joint effort by medical centers, drug makers and the Food and Drug Administration.

In May 2007, he became director of the OHSU Cancer Institute—renamed the Knight Cancer Institute in October 2008 following a $100 million donation from Nike co-founder Phil Knight.

In 2015, Druker celebrated the completion of the Knight Cancer Challenge, raising $1 billion for research at the Knight Cancer Institute. The Oregon Legislature and more than 10,000 donors from Oregon and beyond matched a $500 million grant from Phil and Penny Knight. The challenge gave the institute the funding to launch the Cancer Early Detection Advanced Research Center.

In March 2024, he transitioned to the role of chief executive officer of the Knight Cancer Institute. Druker abruptly resigned in December 2024 while "looking for opportunities where (he) can continue to make an impact on patient’s lives and on the world." During this time, he continued to lead his research lab and see patients, but expressed criticism of OHSU, stating that the institution had "lost sight of what is crucial and forgotten (its) mission." In 2025, he was named the inaugural president of the newly independent Knight Cancer Group, a self-governing entity formed by the Oregon Health & Science University's Knight Cancer Institute following a record $2 billion gift from Phil and Penny Knight. The gift appears to be the largest single donation ever made to any U.S. university, college or academic health center. In an interview with The Cancer Letter, Druker said that this latest gift by the Knights is intended to develop a fully integrated cancer care model that will expand and accelerate diagnostics, ensure access to innovative clinical trials informed by Knight researchers and simplify the experience for patients and families: "I have too many patients and families that are having difficulty navigating our complex medical care system. What I wanted to do is integrate all the great science we have with the best care on the planet."

== Memberships and Awards ==
Druker was an investigator of Howard Hughes Medical Institute (HHMI) from 2002 to 2019. He was elected to the National Academy of Medicine (formerly Institute of Medicine) in 2003 and the National Academy of Sciences in 2007. He is a member of the American Society for Clinical Investigation, Association of American Physicians, American Academy of Arts and Sciences, American Association for the Advancement of Science, American Society of Hematology, American Society for Microbiology, American Society of Clinical Oncology, American Association for Cancer Research, Children’s Oncology Group, and The American Society for Cell Biology. Druker has received the following awards, among others:

- Translational Research Award, Burroughs Wellcome Fund (2000)
- Charles Rodolphe Brupbacher Prize for Cancer Research, Charles Rodolphe Brupbacher Stiftung (2001)
- AACR-Richard and Hinda Rosenthal Foundation Award (2001)
- Warren Alpert Foundation Prize, Harvard Medical School (2001)
- Dameshek Prize, The American Society of Hematology (2001)
- Medal of Honor, American Cancer Society (2002)
- Robert-Koch Prize, Robert Koch Foundation, Cologne, Germany (2005)
- Golden Plate Award, Academy of Achievement (2007)
- Keio Medical Science Prize, Keio University Medical Science Fund, Tokyo, Japan (2007)
- European Inventor of the Year, Industry, European Patent Office (2009)
- The Rowley Prize, International CML Foundation (2009)
- Lasker-DeBakey Clinical Medical Research Award, Albert and Mary Lasker Foundation (2009)
- Meyenburg Award for Cancer Research, Meyenburg Foundation, Heidelberg, Germany (2009)
- Stanley J. Korsmeyer Award, American Society for Clinical Investigation (2011)
- Ernest Beutler Lecture and Prize, American Society of Hematology (2011)
- The Japan Prize in Healthcare and Medical Technology, The Japan Prize Foundation (2012)
- Dickson Prize in Medicine, University of Pittsburgh School of Medicine (2012)
- UCSF Medal, University of California San Francisco (2013).
- Giants of Cancer Care, OncLive (2013)
- A. Alfred Taubman Prize for Excellence in Translational Medical Science (2013)
- The Albany Medical Center Prize in Medicine and Biomedical Research (2013)
- Honorary Doctorate, Erasmus University Rotterdam (2013)
- Hamdan Award for Medical Research Excellence, Sheikh Hamdan Bin Rashid Al Maktoum Awards for Medical Sciences (2014).
- Tang Prize in Biopharmaceutical Science, The Tang Prize Foundation (2018)
- Prince Mahidol Award in the Field of Medicine, Prince Mahidol Award Foundation (2019)
- Sjöberg Prize, The Royal Swedish Academy of Sciences (2019)
- Rell Sunn Award, Moores Cancer Center at UC San Diego Health (2019)
- August M. Watanabe Prize in Translational Research, Indiana Clinical and Translational Sciences Institute (2020)
- Lifetime Achievement Award, Stanford Drug Discovery Program (2023)
- Lila and Murray Gruber Memorial Cancer Research Award, American Academy of Dermatology Association (2024)

== Personal ==
Druker is married to Alexandra Hardy, a one-time reporter for People magazine, and the couple have three children (as of 2009). An earlier marriage, to Barbara Rodriguez in 1990, ended in divorce in 1999.
