= Cooperativa (Portland, Oregon) =

Food hall in Portland, Oregon, US

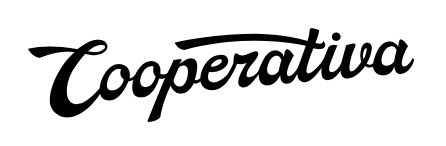

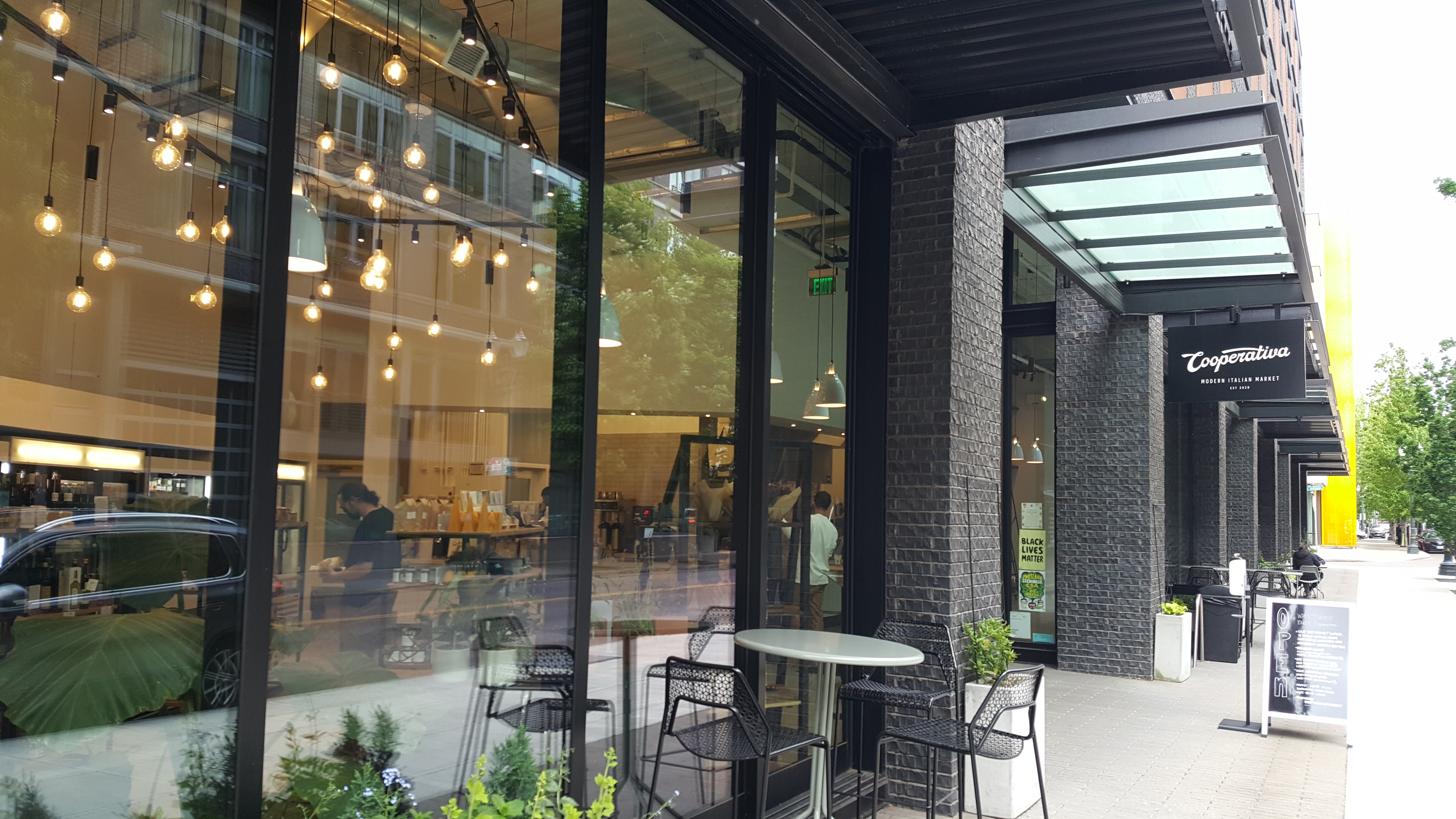
- The food hall's exterior in 2021
- Interactive map of Cooperativa

Restaurant information
- Established: September 2020
- Closed: September 3, 2022
- Location: 1250 Northwest 9th Avenue, Suite 100, Portland, Multnomah, Oregon, 97209, United States
- Coordinates: 45°31′54.6″N 122°40′48.2″W
- Website: cooperativapdx.com

Cooperativa was an Italian food hall and marketplace in Portland, Oregon's Pearl District, in the United States. The business operated from September 2020 to September 2022.

== Description ==
Inspired by Florence's Mercato Centrale, Anna Caporael and Sarah Schafer opened the 5,000-square-foot food hall in the ground level of the Tanner Point building (1250 Northwest 9th Avenue) in northwest Portland's Pearl District. It featured a pizzeria, pasta station, bar, and other vendors selling coffee, flowers, gelato, pastries, and other products. There were 25-foot ceilings and 15 food windows.

== History ==
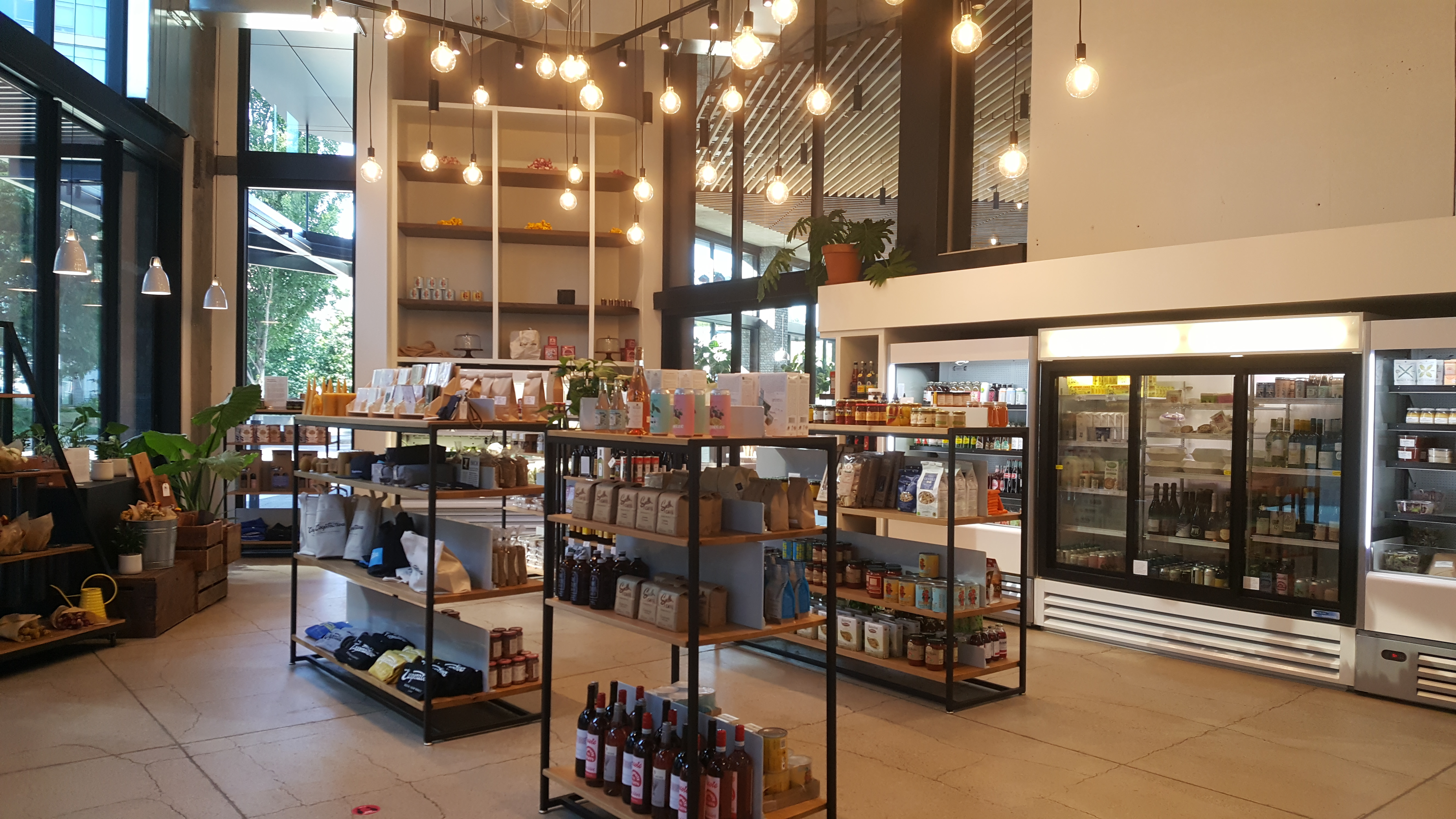
Interior, 2021

Previously slated to open in June or July 2020, the hall opened in September 2020. The marketplace fully opened in August 2021, following the COVID-19 pandemic. Cooperative offered a take-out "Italian Thanksgiving" with lasagna, eggplant cannelloni, meatballs and pasta, wine, and pizza bianca flatbread. Dessert options included almond cake, butterscotch budino, chocolate semolina cake, cookies, and ricotta cheesecake.

In early 2022, Cooperativa employees received a $3,000 grant as part of the national assistance program called The Great American Tip-Off. There were 14 hourly employees at the time.

In August 2022, Caporael and Schafer announced plans to close on September 3. A closing statement said, "As you all know, we opened during a time when uncertainty was the only constant. We have faced a multitude of challenges over the past two years of being open and have fought hard to survive, and after much thought and discussion, we have decided it is time for us to take some time and step away."

== Reception ==
The lasagna was included in The Oregonian's list of "the 19 best dishes restaurant critic Michael Russell ate in 2021". Alex Frane included Cooperativa in Thrillist's 2021 overview of "where to eat in Portland right now". Kara Stokes and Maya MacEvoy included Cooperativa in Eater Portland's 2022 overview of "where to eat and drink" in the Pearl District.
