= Columbia Sportswear =

American company that manufactures and distributes outerwear and sportswear

Columbia Sportswear Company

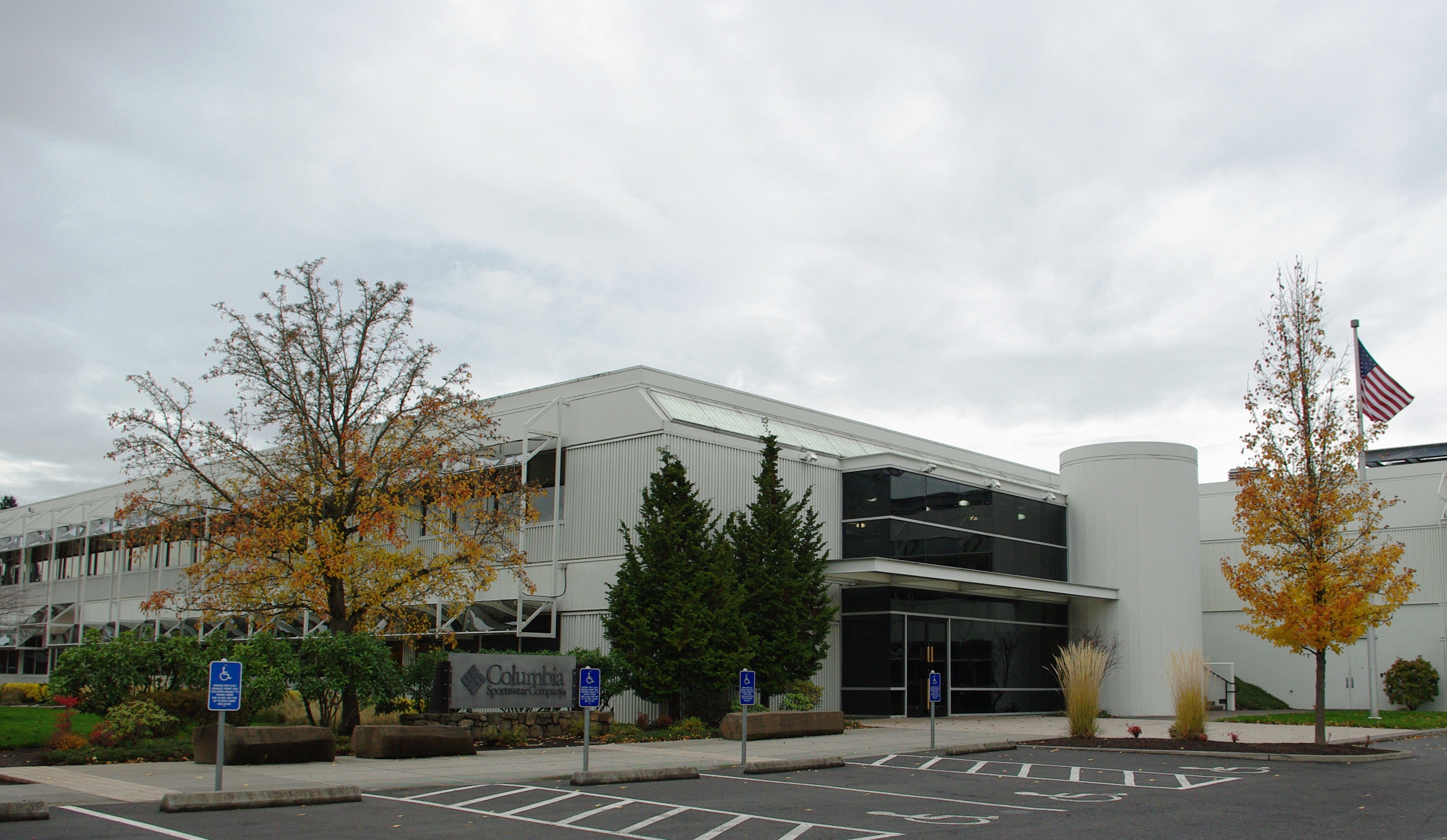
- Columbia Sportswear's company headquarters in Portland, Oregon
- Type: Public
- Traded as: Nasdaq: COLM; S&P 400 component Russell 1000 Index component
- Industry: Apparel
- Founded: 1938; 88 years ago
- Headquarters: Unincorporated Washington County, Oregon (near Beaverton), United States (Portland, Oregon, postal address); 45.52938°N 122.82535°W
- Number of locations: 449 (December 2022)
- Key people: Timothy Boyle (president, chairman, & CEO); Jim Swanson (EVP & CFO)
- Products: Outerwear and sportswear
- Brands: Columbia; Sorel; Mountain Hardwear; Prana
- Revenue: US$3.4 billion (2025)
- Net income: ▼US$177 million (2025)
- Number of employees: 9,620 (Dec 2025)
- Website: www.columbia.com

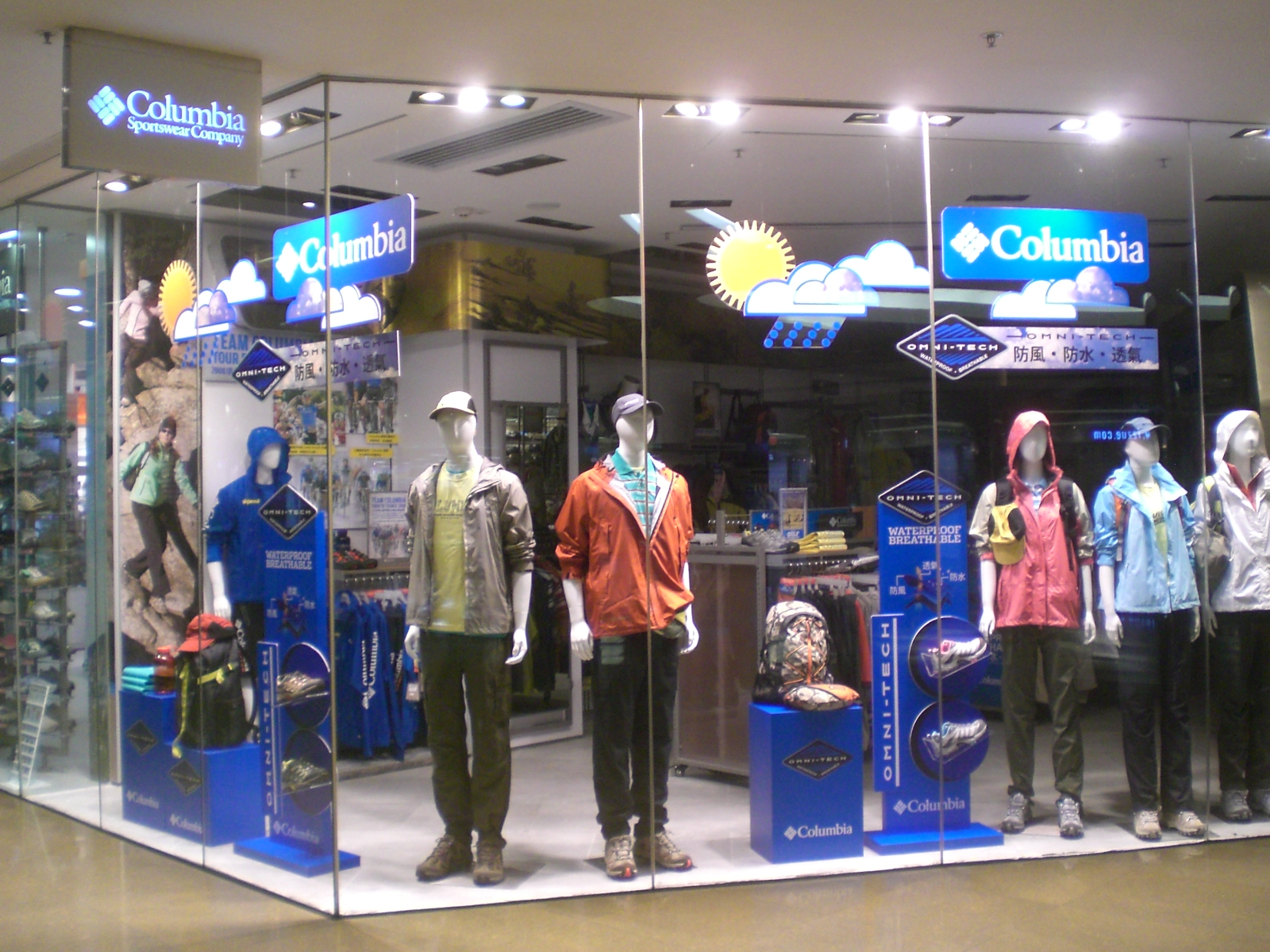
Columbia Sportswear retail store in Hong Kong

The Columbia Sportswear Company is an American company that manufactures and distributes outerwear, sportswear, and footwear, as well as headgear, camping equipment, ski apparel, and outerwear accessories.

It was founded in 1938 by Paul Lamfrom, the father of Gert Boyle. The company is headquartered in Cedar Mill, an unincorporated area in Washington County, Oregon, in the Portland metropolitan area near Beaverton.

Columbia's rapid sales growth was fueled by its jackets, which featured breathable waterproof fabric and interchangeable shells and liners.

== History ==
Columbia Sportswear began as a family-owned hat distributor. Former chairwoman Gert Boyle's parents, Paul and Marie Lamfrom, fled Nazi Germany in 1937 and immediately purchased a Portland hat distributorship. The company became the Columbia Hat Company, named for the nearby Columbia River. In 1948, Gert married Neal Boyle, who became the head of the company. Frustrations over suppliers influenced the family to start manufacturing their own products, and Columbia Hat Company became Columbia Sportswear Company in 1960.

In 1970, Neal Boyle died following a heart attack. Gert and son Tim Boyle, then a University of Oregon senior, took over the operations of Columbia, rescuing it from bankruptcy. Gert Boyle served as company president from 1970 until 1988 and additionally became chairman of its board of directors in 1983. She remained chairman until her death in 2019. Tim Boyle succeeded his mother as Columbia's president and CEO in 1988 and continues to hold the position in 2024.

Columbia became a publicly traded company in 1998. It acquired footwear maker Sorel in 2000 and Mountain Hardwear in 2003. In 2006, Columbia acquired the Pacific Trail and Montrail brands, and in 2014 they acquired Prana.

In 2001, the company moved its headquarters from Portland to a site in an unincorporated part of Washington County, in the Cedar Mill area and just outside the Beaverton city limits. The site on NW Science Park Drive has a Portland mailing address, but is not in Portland. In 2007, City of Portland officials attempted to convince Columbia Sportswear to move back to Portland, but the company ultimately rejected the idea due to the increased corporate tax burden such a move would entail and decided to expand its existing headquarters instead.

In 2001, it was the largest American retailer of ski apparel based on gross revenue.

On June 15, 2008, Columbia Sportswear announced a three-year sponsorship of the cycling team formerly known as Team High Road and before that T-Mobile and Team Telekom. The sponsorship began on July 5, 2008, with the start of the Tour de France. The team's name was "Team Columbia". The sponsorship included both the men's and women's teams, and ended at the end of 2010.

On August 4, 2010, Columbia Sportswear Company signed an agreement to acquire OutDry Technologies S.r.l., which owns the intellectual property and other assets comprising the OutDry brand and related business, via a cash purchase from Nextec S.r.l., based near Milan, Italy. The transaction was expected to close during the third quarter of 2010, subject to customary closing conditions, and is not expected to have a material effect on the company's 2010 operating results.

In March 2015, Bryan Timm was named president of the company, taking over that position from Tim Boyle, who remained CEO. In May 2017 it was announced Timm would step down and the duties of president would revert to Tim Boyle.

On November 3, 2019, chairwoman Gert Boyle died at the age of 95. In January 2020, Tim Boyle was named Chairman of the company's board of directors.

In October 2020, the company announced that alpaca wool would no longer be a part of their collections, including their other brands Prana, Mountain Hardwear and Sorel.

In November 2023, Columbia Sportswear Company announced that Cory Long was appointed as president of its brand Sorel.

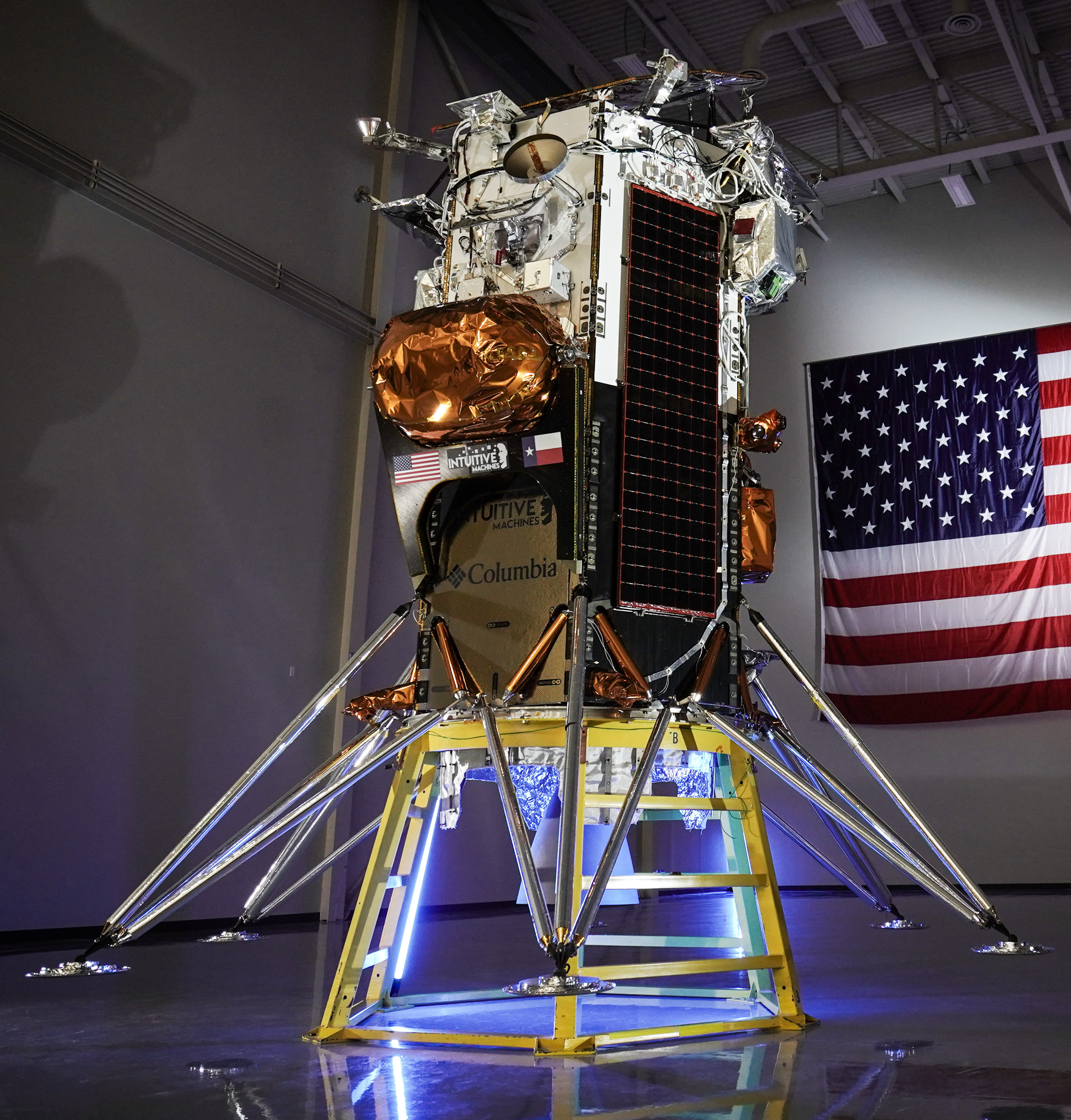
Columbia logo on the Odysseus lunar lander

In February 2024, the Odysseus lunar lander used the Omni-Heat thermal reflective insulation technology produced by Columbia Sportswear. In March 2025, an additional spaceship, the Athena lunar lander, was protected by Columbia's Omni-Heat thermal technology.

In November 2025, Columbia Sportswear launched a new brand platform and advertising campaign emphasizing its focus on designing apparel for real outdoor conditions, using an unconventional and ironic tone to differentiate itself within the outdoor apparel market.

In November 2025, Joseph Boyle, son of Columbia CEO Tim Boyle and grandson of Gert Boyle, was named co-president of Columbia Sportswear alongside Peter Bragdon, advancing the company's succession plans.

== Locations ==
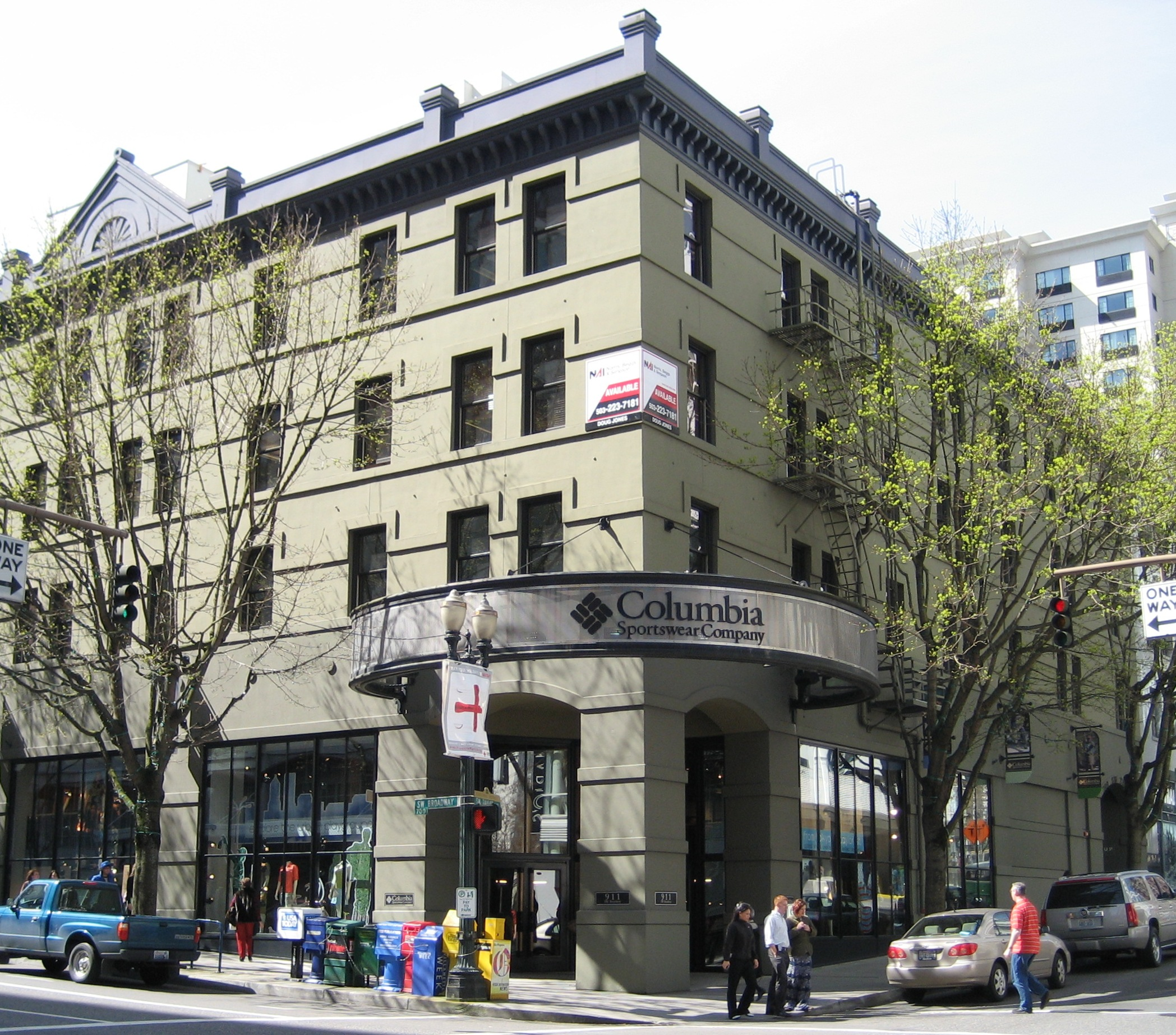
Columbia's flagship store in downtown Portland, Oregon

Columbia Sportswear distributes its products in more than 72 countries and 13,000 retailers. Columbia also operates its own chain of retail stores, including its flagship store located in downtown Portland, Oregon.

== Financial information ==
As of March 30, 2025, the company's market capitalization is about $4.17 billion, with 2021 net revenue of $3.13 billion.

As of 2018, 40% of Columbia's business came from abroad.

In October 2023, Columbia Sportswear reported 3% of revenue growth as sales reached $985.7 million.

=== Stock exchanges ===
Columbia Sportswear Company is publicly traded on NASDAQ with ticker symbol COLM.

=== Trade and tariffs ===
The clothing business in the US is still largely subject to what remains of the Smoot–Hawley Tariff Act, passed in 1930. Since 2001, Columbia has paired its designers with teams of trade experts in a process the company calls "tariff engineering" in order to reach lower tariffs, taxes, or duties. For example, Columbia applies a very thin layer of fabric to the soles of its shoes since tariffs on fabric soles are lower than those on rubber soles; the fabric wears away within days. For similar reasons, jackets are waterproofed and filled with at least 10% down.

Vietnam is Columbia's largest supplier, and 25% of the company's footwear originates in China.

Columbia has operated in China since 2014 as Columbia Sportswear Commercial (Shanghai) Company as a joint venture with Swire Pacific Limited, reaching a total of 86 Chinese retail stores by 2017. In 2018, Columbia announced it would buy out Swire's remaining 40% stake by 2019.

== See also ==
- List of companies based in Oregon
- List of outdoor industry parent companies
