= List of climbing and mountaineering equipment brands =

Climbing equipment
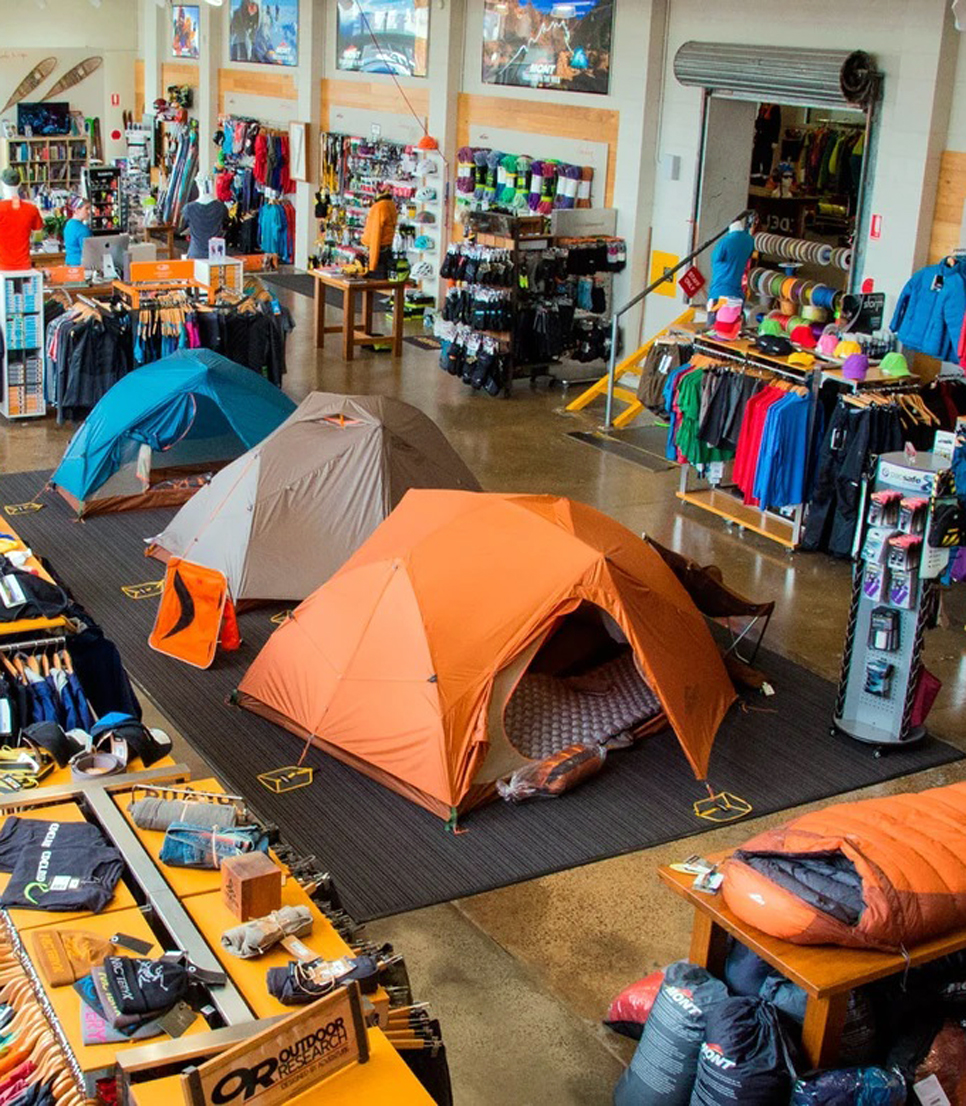
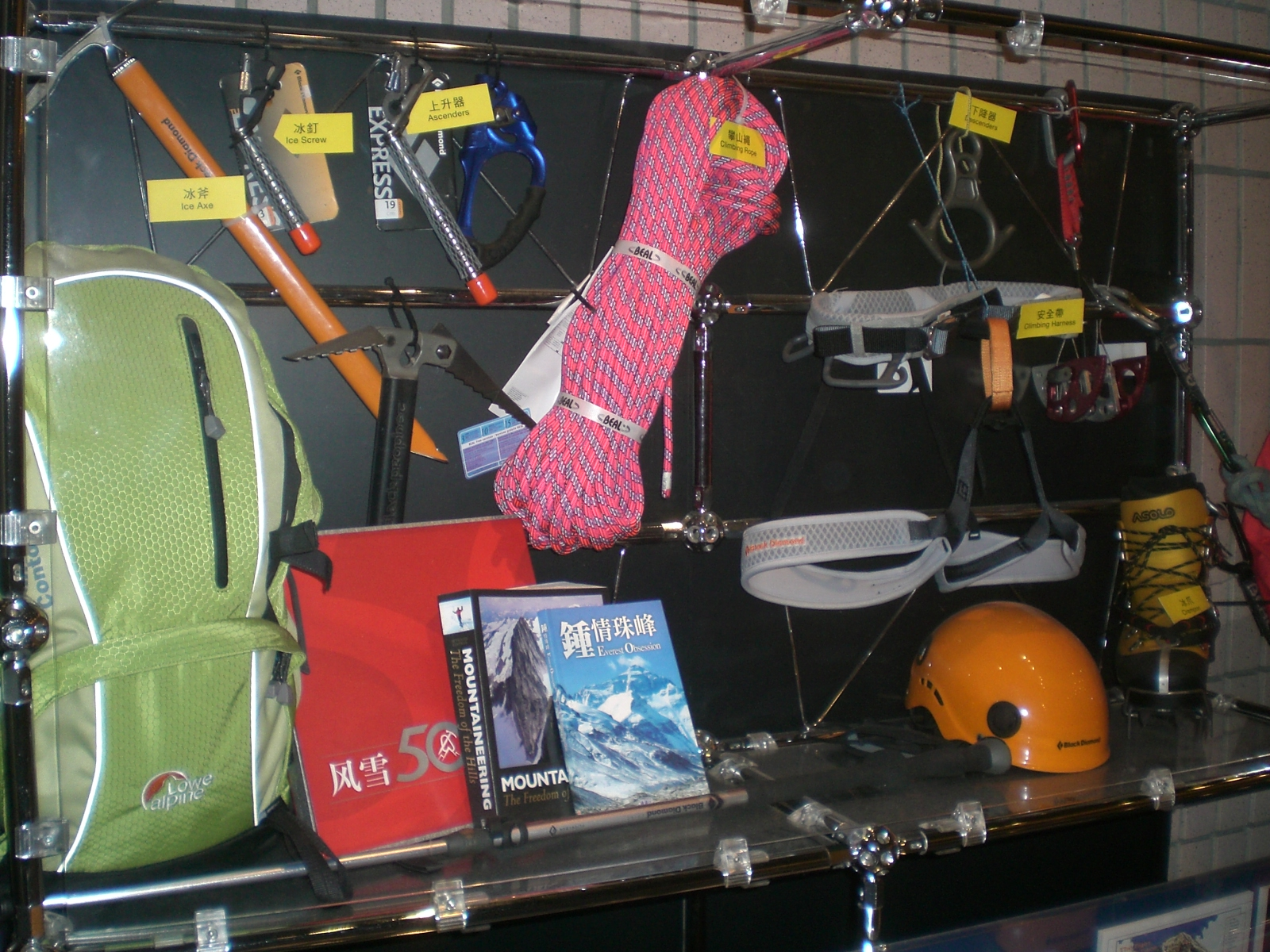

The following is a list of notable brands and manufacturers of climbing and mountaineering equipment (including for all forms of rock climbing and of ice climbing), sorted by continent and by country.

== Asia ==
=== Nepal ===
- Kalapatthar
- Dolpo
- Sherpa (fabric)

== Europe ==
=== Czech Republic ===
- Mouka Tišnov

=== Denmark ===
- ECCO
- Hummel

=== Finland ===
- Karhu
- Nokian Footwear
- Polar
- Suunto (Ultimately owned by Liescheng, China) (Finland-based, Chinese-owned)

=== France ===
- Aigle
- Eider
- Lafuma
- Millet
- Petzl
- Quechua
- Rossignol
- Salomon (Ultimately owned by ANTA Sports, China) (France-based, Chinese-owned)

=== Germany ===
- Adidas
- Hanwag
- Deuter
- Jack Wolfskin (German-based, Chinese-owned)
- Lowa Sportschuhe
- Meindl
- Ortovox
- Puma (German-based, French-owned)
- Vaude

=== Italy ===
- CAMP
- Grivel
- La Sportiva
- Salewa
- Scarpa
- Vibram

=== Norway ===
- Ajungilak (Mammut)
- Bergans of Norway
- Dale of Norway
- Helly Hansen
- Norrøna
- Devold

=== Slovenia ===
- Alpina Žiri
- Elan

=== Sweden ===
- Fjällräven (Fenix Outdoor AB)
- Haglöfs (ASICS, Japan) (Sweden-based, Japanese-owned)
- Hestra
- Hilleberg
- Primus
- Silva
- Tenson
- Trangia (Trangia AB)

=== Switzerland ===
- Mammut
- Victorinox

=== UK ===
- Berghaus (Pentland Group)
- Craghoppers
- Dunlop Sport
- Karrimor
- Mountain Warehouse
- Peter Storm
- Rab
- Regatta
- Rohan
- Trespass
- Wild Country
- Vango (AMG Group)

== North America ==
=== Canada ===
- Mountain Equipment Company, formerly Mountain Equipment Co-op
- Arc'teryx (Ultimately owned by ANTA Sports, China) (Canada-based, Chinese-owned)

=== United States ===
- Black Diamond
- CamelBak
- Cascade Designs
  - MSR (Mountain Safety Research)
  - Therm-a-Rest
- Champion
- Coleman
- Columbia Sportswear
  - Columbia Montrail
  - Mountain Hardwear
  - prAna
- Danner
- Eddie Bauer
- Five Ten Footwear (US-based, German-owned)
- Gerry
- GoLite
- Granite Gear
- Head (American-owned)
- Ibex
- Johnson Outdoors
- Keen
- Kelty
- L.L.Bean
- Leatherman
- Lowe Alpine (Asolo)
- Marmot (Jarden)
- Merrell
- NEMO Equipment
- New Balance
- Nike
- Osprey Packs
- Outdoor Research
- Patagonia
- Penfield
- REI (Recreational Equipment Inc.)
- VF Corporation
  - Jansport
  - Eastpak
  - The North Face
  - Timberland

== Oceania ==
=== Australia ===
- Anaconda
- Boating Camping and Fishing
- Rebel
- Sea to Summit

=== New Zealand ===
- Icebreaker
- Kathmandu
- Macpac

== See also ==
- Climbing equipment
  - Rock-climbing equipment
- List of outdoor industry parent companies
