= Amazing Race Suomi season 4 =

Amazing Race Suomi
- Season 4
- Promotional poster featuring host Heikki Paasonen
- Presented by: Heikki Paasonen
- No. of days: 24
- No. of teams: 11
- No. of legs: 12
- No. of episodes: 12

Release
- Original network: Nelonen
- Original release: 14 November 2026 – present

Additional information
- Filming dates: 23 May – 15 June 2026

Series chronology
- ← Previous; Season 3

This is the fourth season of Amazing Race Suomi (English: Amazing Race Finland), a Finnish reality competition show based on the American series The Amazing Race. Hosted by Heikki Paasonen, it features eleven teams of two, each with a pre-existing relationship and including at least one celebrity contestant, competing in a race around Europe and Africa to win €30,000. Starting in Helsinki, racers travelled through Slovenia, Croatia, South Africa, Namibia and Zimbabwe. New elements introduced this season include the Fast Forward. The season premiered on 14 November 2026 on Nelonen and is set to conclude on 13 February 2027.

== Production ==
=== Development and filming ===
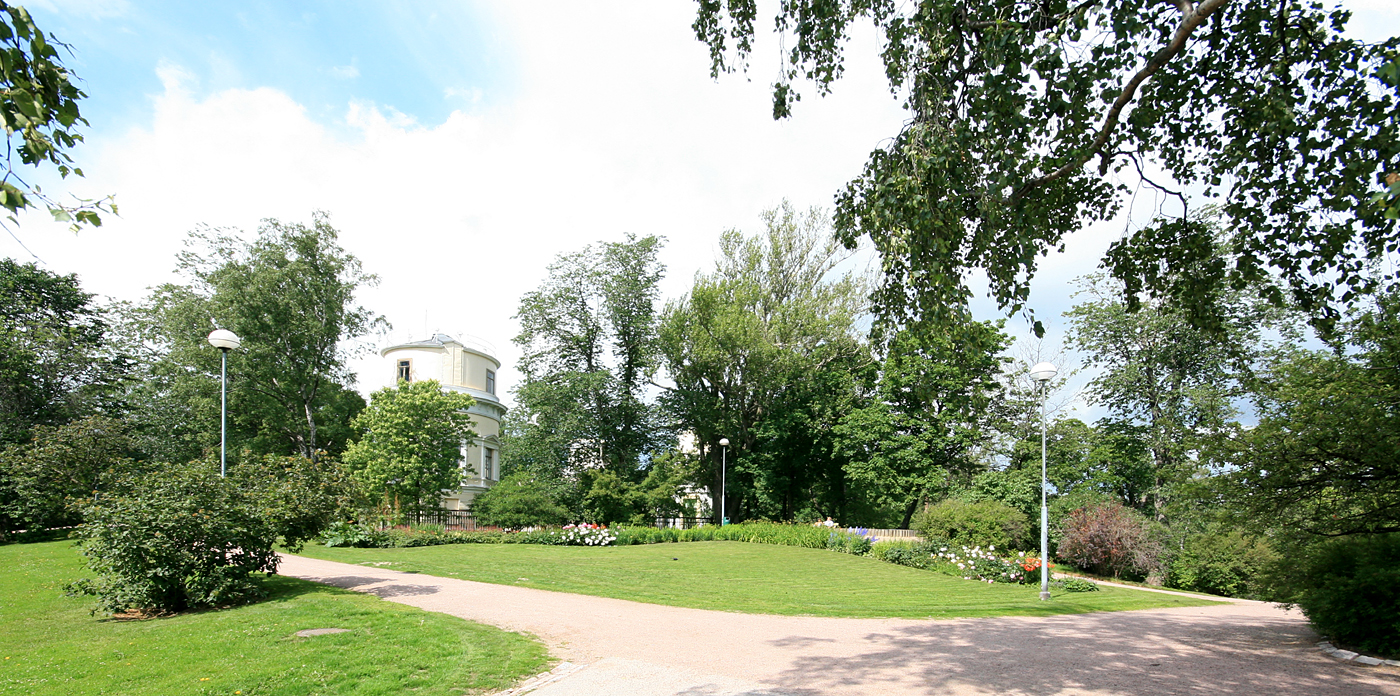
The starting line for the fourth season of Amazing Race Suomi was at Tähtitorninvuori.

On 19 May 2026, Nelonen announced that Amazing Race Suomi was renewed for a fourth season. Production for this season began on 23 May in Helsinki. On 15 June, host Heikki Paasonen announced on his Instagram page that the season had concluded after 24 days of filming.

The Express Pass returns from the last season but is only awarded once during the season on a random leg. In the first episode, Paasonen announced that this season would introduce the Fast Forward (Ohituskaista – lit. '"Fast Lane"'). It allows one team after they complete specific task on the season to skip all the remaining tasks on that leg and head directly to the Pit Stop.

== Release ==
=== Broadcast ===
During the renewal announcement, the fourth season of Amazing Race Suomi was revealed to premiere in November 2026. In October 2026, the season was announced to be premiering on 14 November 2026. The season's first trailer was released on Ruutu on 26 October.

This season of Amazing Race Suomi had a behind-the-scenes podcast called Amazing-podcast hosted by contestants Joel Hirvonen and Elias Salonen with episodes released on Supla following the broadcast release of each television episode.

=== Marketing ===
Sponsors for this season include Active Marin & Outdoor Oy, CamelBak, Care Plus, Fjällräven, Haglöfs, Hart-Sport, Jack Wolfskin and Rela tablets.

== Cast ==
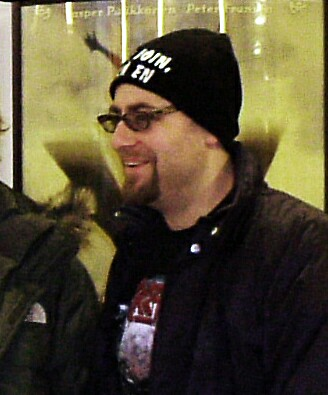
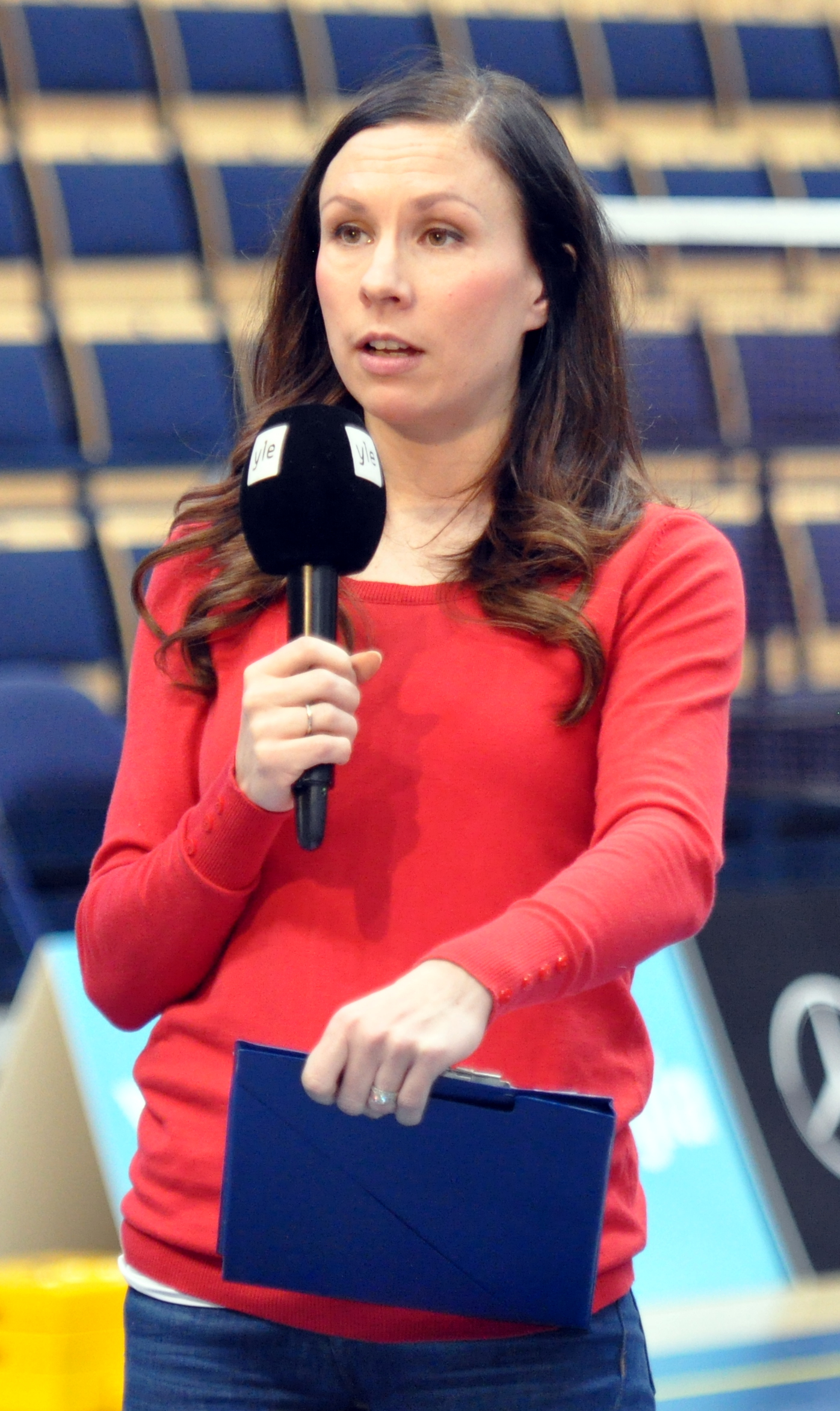
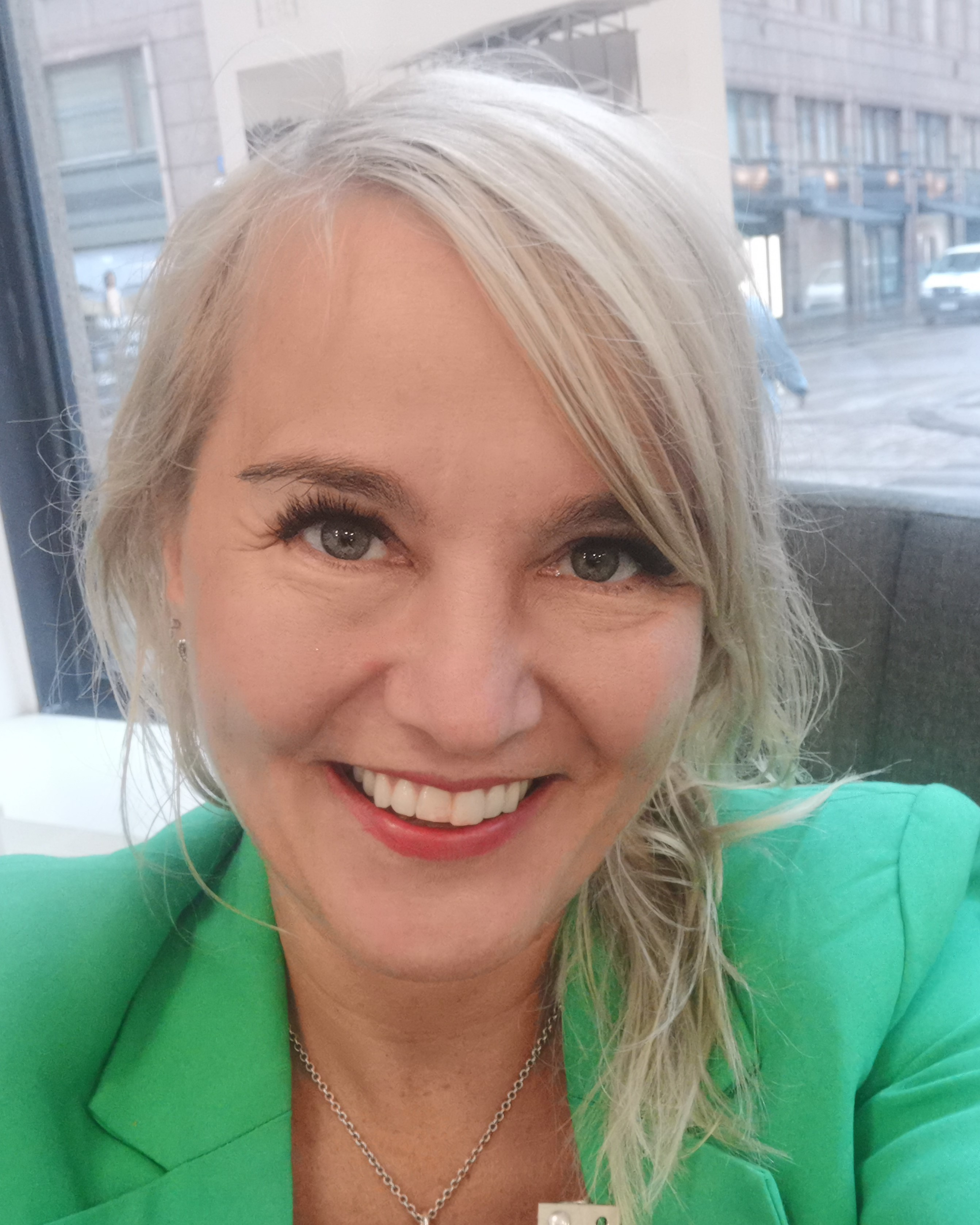
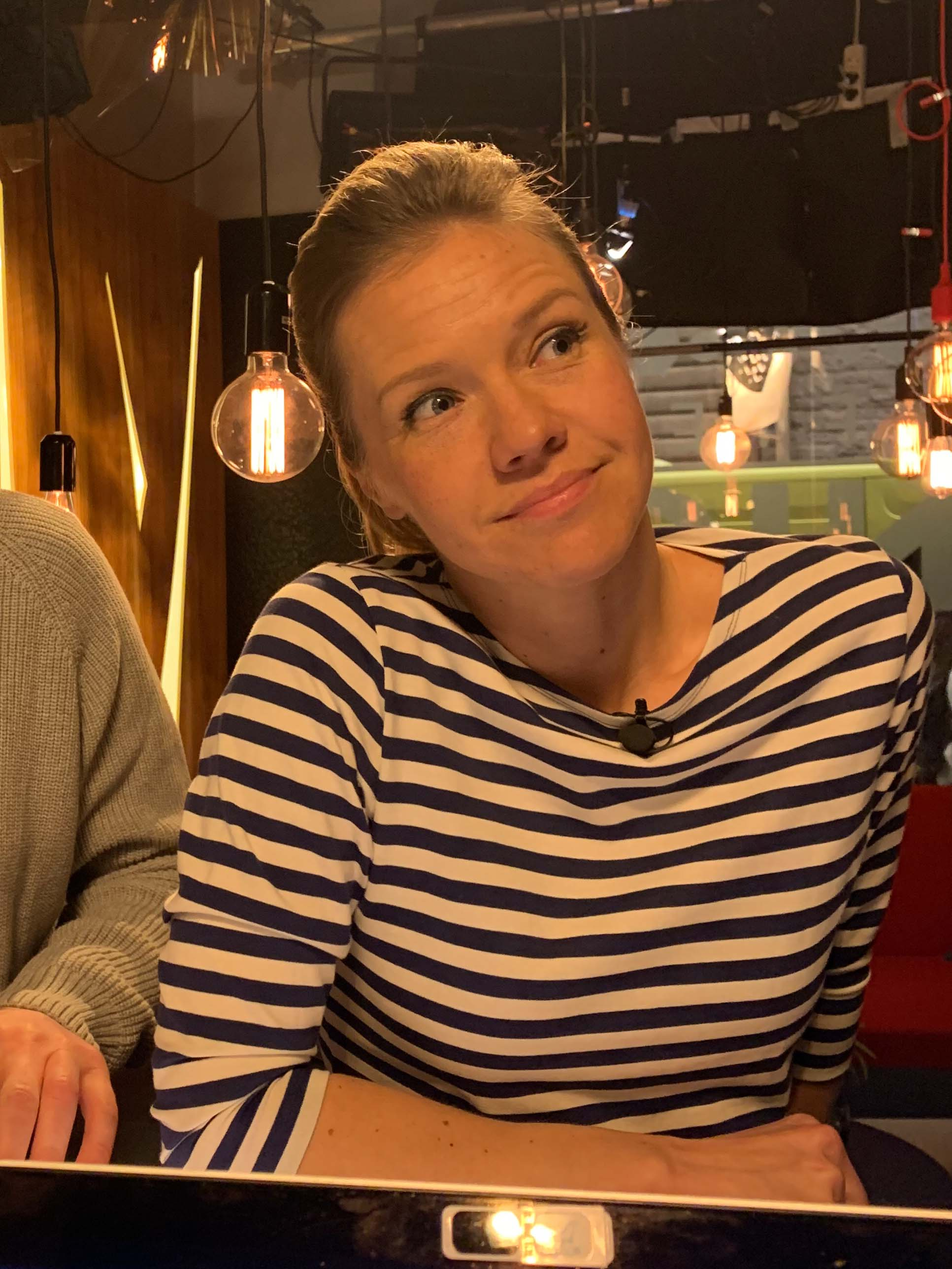
From left to right: Aleksi Mäkelä, Petra Manner, Satu Taiveaho and Sonja Kailassaari

The cast for the fourth season consists of eleven Finnish celebrities and their relatives and/or friends.

Contestants	Notability	Age	Relationship	Status
Hamza El Issaoui	Social media influencer	26	Siblings	Eliminated 1st (in Ljubljana, Slovenia)
Nasra El Issaoui	—N/a	29	Siblings	Eliminated 1st (in Ljubljana, Slovenia)
Mikko Silvennoinen	Television presenter	51	Friends	Eliminated 2nd (in Kranjska Gora, Slovenia)
Nisa Soraya	Pop singer	69	Friends	Eliminated 2nd (in Kranjska Gora, Slovenia)
Aleksi Mäkelä	Director	56	Father & Daughter	Participating
Nikita Mäkelä	Love Island Suomi contestant	29	Father & Daughter	Participating
Elias Salonen	Actor	31	Friends/Culture Brothers	Participating
Joel Hirvonen	Actor	31	Friends/Culture Brothers	Participating
Kirsikka Simberg	Podcast host	40	Friends/Podcasters	Participating
Enni Koistinen	Podcast host	37	Friends/Podcasters	Participating
Laura Arffman	Sports correspondant	40	Work Colleagues	Participating
Petra Manner	Sports correspondant	41	Work Colleagues	Participating
Mikko Töyssy	Actor & singer	44	Military Friends	Participating
Jussi Tervaniemi	—N/a	46	Military Friends	Participating
Nanna Karalahti	Wellness coach	38	Life Partners	Participating
Niklas Vettanen	—N/a	32	Life Partners	Participating
Satu Taiveaho	Former Member of Parliament	49	Married Couple	Participating
Ville Rajala	—N/a	46	Married Couple	Participating
Sonja Kailassaari	Journalist	45	Best Friends	Participating
Rami Virtanen	—N/a	47	Best Friends	Participating
Teemu Liila	Sijoituskästi podcast host	26	Friends/Sijoituskästi Hosts	Participating
Kevin van Dessel	Sijoituskästi podcast host	26	Friends/Sijoituskästi Hosts	Participating

== Results ==
The following teams are listed with their placements in each leg. Placements are listed in finishing order.

- A red placement with a dagger (†) indicates that the team was eliminated.

Team placement (by leg)
Team	1	2	3	4	5	6	7	8	9	10	11	12
Nanna & Niklas	6th	1st										
Teemu & Kevin	3rd	2nd										
Laura & Petra	8th	3rd										
Aleksi & Nikita	5th	4th										
Elias & Joel	4th	5th										
Kirsikka & Enni	1st	6th										
Mikko & Jussi	7th	7th										
Sonja & Rami	2nd	8th										
Satu & Ville	9th	9th										
Mikko & Nisa	10th	10th†										
Hamza & Nasra	11th†											

== Race summary ==
Destinations	Air travel Rail travel Water travel Bus travel Helicopter travel Bicycle travel Gondola travel
Route Markers	Kiertotie (Detour) Tiesulku (Roadblock) Ohituskaista (Fast Forward) Hidaste (Speed Bump); Express–Passi (Express Pass) Etapin päätepiste (Pit Stop)

=== Leg 1 (Finland → Slovenia) ===
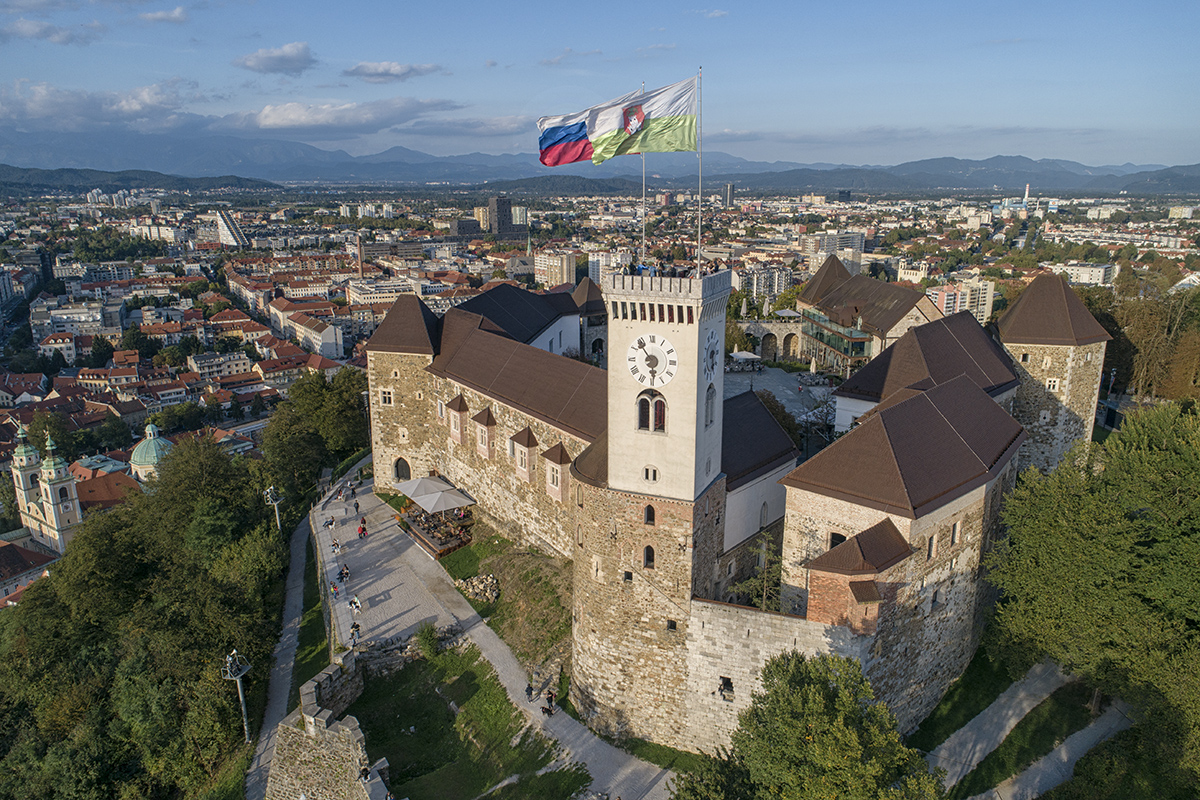
Once in Ljubljana, teams had to deliver potatoes to Ljubljana Castle.

- Episode 1: "The Journey Begins" / Matka alkaa! (14 November 2026)
- Eliminated: Hamza & Nasra

Locations

- Helsinki, Finland (Ullanlinna – Tähtitorninvuori) (Starting Line)
- Helsinki (Market Square)
- Helsinki (Helsinki Central Station) → Vantaa (Helsinki Airport Station)
- Helsinki (Helsinki–Vantaa Airport) → Ljubljana, Slovenia (Ljubljana Airport)
- Ljubljana (Four Points by Sheraton Ljubljana Mons)
- Ljubljana (Levstikov Square – Hercules Fountain)
- Ljubljana (Ljubljana Castle – Gostilna na Gradu)
- Ljubljana (New Square (in Slovene) – Ivan Hribar Monument)
- Ljubljana (Prešeren Square)
- Ljubljana (Butchers' Bridge)
- Ljubljana (Republic Square)

Episode summary

- Teams began the race at Tähtitorninvuori, from where they travelled on foot to Market Square. Once there, teams had to search among the market stands for a coloured handkerchief that matched their team colour to receive their next clue, which instructed them to travel by train to the airport and fly to Ljubljana, Slovenia.
- Once in Ljubljana, teams were released from the Four Points by Sheraton Ljubljana Mons in the order that they arrived at Helsinki–Vantaa Airport. There, teams found their next clue instructing them to travel to the Hercules Fountain in Ljubljana's Old Town, retrieve a 30-kilogram sack of potatoes and ten individual potatoes by asking in Slovene and deliver them to the Gostilna na Gradu restaurant at Ljubljana Castle to receive their next clue, which directed them to the Ivan Hribar Monument.
- This season's first Detour was a choice between Grate (Raasta) or Build (Rakenna). In Grate, teams had to grate cabbages until they filled two buckets to receive their next clue. In Build, teams had to set up a fruit and vegetable stand so that it matched an example to receive their next clue.
- After the Detour, teams had to travel to Butchers' Bridge and unlock one of the bridge's love locks with the birth year of Luka Dončić (1999) to receive their next clue, which directed them to the Pit Stop: Republic Square.

=== Leg 2 (Slovenia) ===
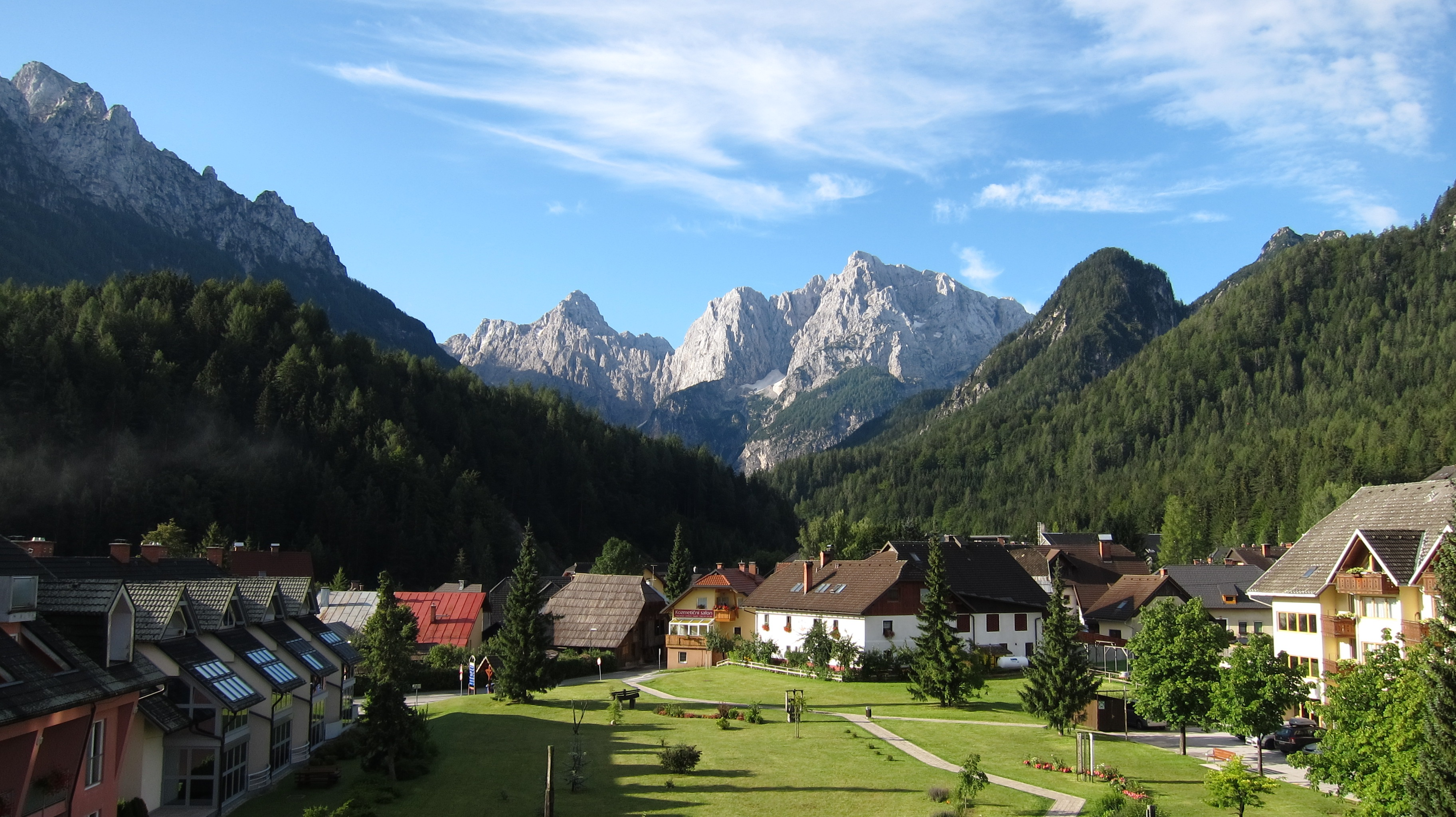
The second leg of the race took place in the breathtaking town of Kranjska Gora.

- Episode 2: "Fanny Packs and Memory Lapses" / Vyölaukkuja ja musitikatkoksia (21 November 2026) (Note: This episode was released one week early for purchase on Ruutu+.)
- Eliminated: Mikko & Nisa

Locations

- Ljubljana (Four Points by Sheraton Ljubljana Mons)
- Kranjska Gora (Kranjska Gora Bus Station)
- Kranjska Gora (Hotel & Restaurant Lipa)
- Kranjska Gora (Field)
- Kranjska Gora (Trg Pred Cerkvijo)
- Kranjska Gora (Korona Casino & Hotel)
- Kranjska Gora (Pišnica River)
- Kranjska Gora (Lake Jasna)

Episode summary

- At the start of this leg, teams were instructed to travel by taxi to the Kranjska Gora bus station and find their next clue outside the Hotel & Restaurant Lipa.
- This leg's Detour was a choice between Romp (Peuhu) or Chore (Puuha). In Romp, teams had to find a needle in a hay bale to receive their next clue. In Chore, teams had to stack wood into two stacks based on the colour of the wood's paint (either red or yellow) to receive their next clue.
- After the Detour, teams had to grab a container that they would need later in the leg (a small cup, a medium size bucket or a large bucket) before travelling to the main square in front of the town's alpine church. There, teams had to take three photographs with locals at the statue of Josip Vandot, the Liznjek Farm and the Gostilna Pri Martinu restaurant while the locals were wearing a hat resembling the Slovenian character Kekec to receive their next clue sending them to the Korona Casino & Hotel.
- In this season's first Roadblock, one team member had to fill up a hip bath with cold water from the Pišnica river using their container from the Detour, take a dip in the bath and have their partner pour water on their head to receive their next clue, which directed them to the Pit Stop: Lake Jasna.

=== Leg 3 (Slovenia → Croatia) ===
- Episode 3: "Thoughts in a Knot" / Ajatukset solmussa (28 November 2026)

Locations

- Ljubljana (Ljubljana Railway Station) → Zagreb, Croatia (Zagreb Main Station)
- Zagreb (Esplanade Zagreb Hotel)
- Zagreb (Medvedgrad)

=== Future legs ===
- Croatia
  - Zagreb (Hendrix Bridge (in Serbo-Croatian))
- Namibia
  - Swakopmund (Swakopmund Jetty)
- South Africa
  - Cape Town (Foreshore Freeway Bridge)
  - Cape Town (Hotel Sky)
- Zimbabwe
  - Victoria Falls (The Lookout Café)
  - Victoria Falls National Park (Batoka Gorge)

== Reception ==
=== Television ratings ===
The following ratings are taken from Finnpanel.

No.	Air date	Episode	Weekly rank	Overnight viewers	Seven day viewers	Ref
1	14 November 2026	The Journey Begins	2	239,000		
2	21 November 2026	Fanny Packs and Memory Lapses				
3	28 November 2026	Thoughts in a Knot				
4	5 December 2026	Planetary Stuff				
5	12 December 2026	Nighttime Tears				
