= Mammut Sports Group =

Swiss manufacturer of clothing

Mammut Sports Group AG
- Type: Aktiengesellschaft
- Industry: Clothing, mountaineering equipment
- Founded: 1862 in Dintikon, Switzerland
- Founder: Kaspar Tanner
- Headquarters: Seon, Aargau, Switzerland
- Key people: Heiko Schäfer (Chairman of the Management Board)
- Products: Barryvox; Eiger Collection; Core Protect Rope
- Revenue: CHF 253.4 million (2018)
- Number of employees: 900 (2024)
- Parent: Jacobs Capital (formerly Telemos Capital)
- Website: mammut.com

Mammut Sports Group AG (formerly also Arova-Mammut AG, Mammut AG) is a Swiss manufacturer of clothing, footwear and equipment for alpine sports such as climbing, snow sports and trail running as well as trekking. It was originally founded in 1862 as a ropemaker and has been part of the investment company Telemos Capital since 2021.

The Mammut Sports Group belongs to the London-based investment firm Jacobs Capital (formerly Telemos Capital) as a private equity company. The company is based in Seon, Switzerland, while the central distribution warehouse for Europe is located in Wolfertschwenden in Bavaria.

The Mammut Sports Group employs around 900 people in 9 countries and is active in over 50 countries through subsidiaries, distributors, and agencies. It operates a number of flagship stores internationally, as well as its own stores and outlets, online retail and specialist retailers.

== History ==
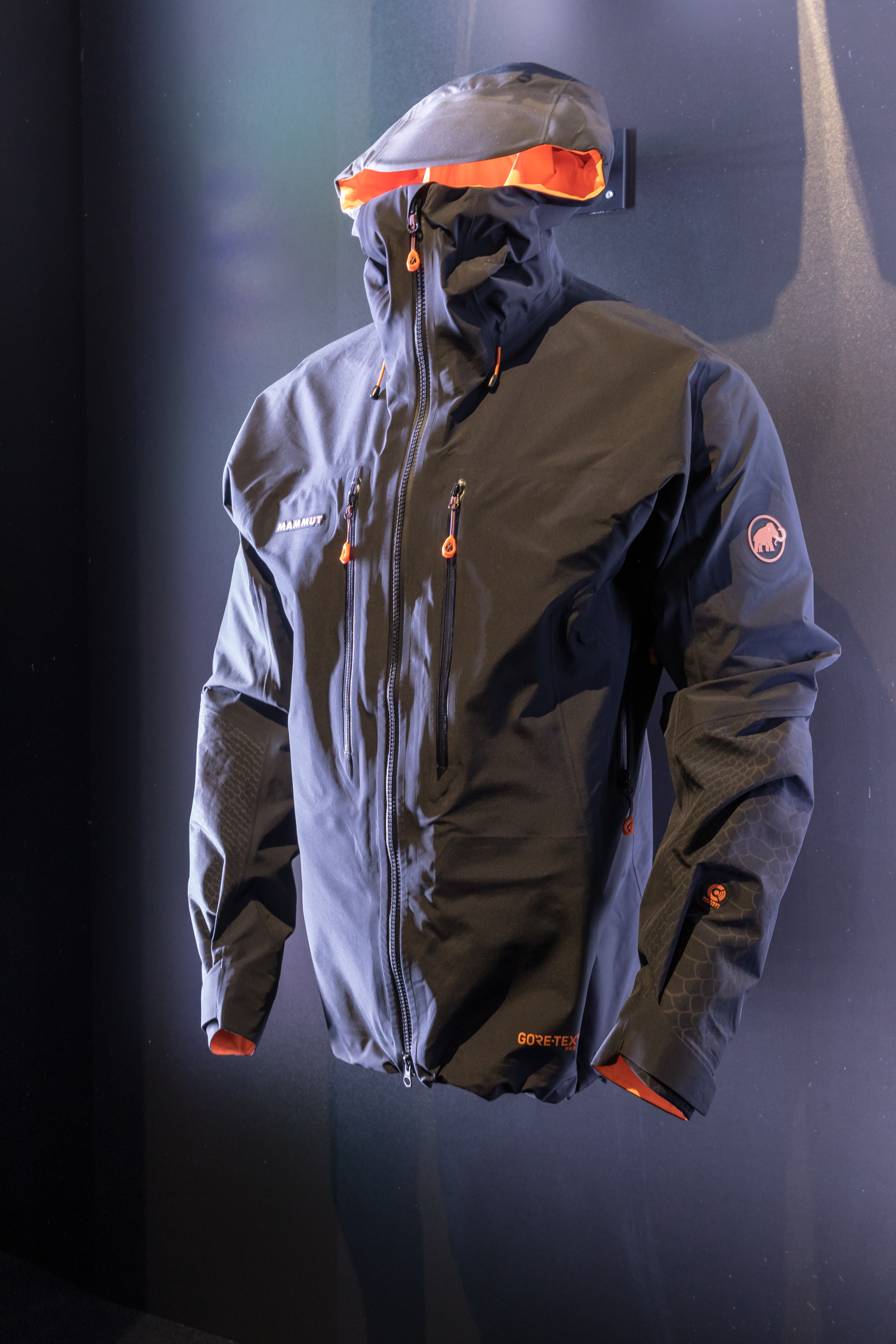
Outdoor jacket by Mammut, 2018

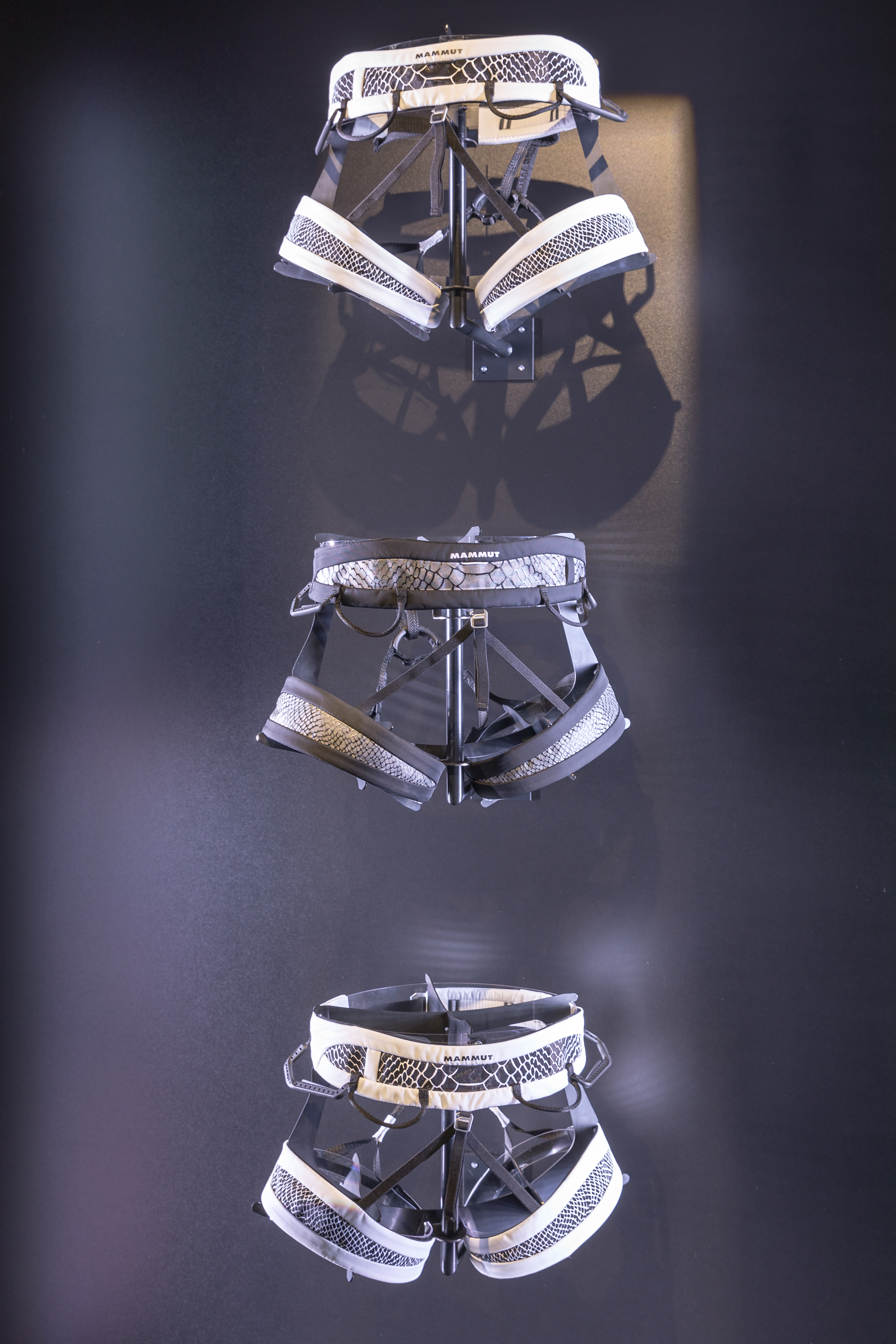
Mammut climbing harnesses, 2018

=== 19th and 20th century ===
The company was founded in 1862 by Kaspar Tanner in the Swiss village Dintikon as a ropery and moved to nearby Lenzburg in 1878. In 1898, Kaspar's son Oscar took over the company, which grew significantly in the following decades, particularly during World War I. From 1919, the company bore the name Seilwarenfabrik AG Lenzburg. Oscar Tanner left the company in 1924.

From 1943, the products of Seilwarenfabrik AG Lenzburg were marketed under the brand Mammut; during the rebranding, the mammoth (German word: Mammut) was introduced as the company logo. In 1968, the Swiss Heberlein Group took over the company and renamed it Arova Lenzburg AG. The Heberlein Group sold Arova Lenzburg AG to the Swiss conglomerate Conzzeta in 1982, who renamed it Arova Mammut AG in 1984 and moved its seat to Seon, Switzerland, in 1992, where the company has been based ever since.

When the original core business of the ropery fell into a crisis and comparable rope factories closed, the company gradually developed into a manufacturer of outdoor clothing in the 1970s and 1980s. The first outdoor collection by the company was launched in 1981. In 1989, the backpack manufacturer Fürst was acquired.

=== 21st century ===
In the new millennium, the company, which has been using the name Mammut Sports Group AG since 2003, took over a number of other companies and increased international activities. Since 2001, Ajungilak, a Norwegian manufacturer of sleeping bags, has been part of the Mammut Sports Group. On April 1, 2003, the group also took over the Swiss shoe manufacturer and developer of notable products, such as the Raichle Flexon snow boots, Raichle Sportartikel, founded in 1909. Raichle then covered the mountain, trekking, hiking and multifunctional footwear submarkets within the Mammut Sports Group. In spring 2009, the Raichle brand was discontinued in favor of a uniform brand identity, and the products have been marketed under the Mammut brand since then. On July 1, 2011, the Mammut Sports Group took over the company Snowpulse, a manufacturer of avalanche airbags.

A report in the Handelszeitung ranked the company among the "Hidden champions" in 2008.

The original central distribution warehouse was located in Memmingen until the end of 2012 due to the need for expansion to match the company's growth. In late 2012, the new central distribution warehouse in Wolfertschwenden near Memmingen opened, and the company's logistics were also relocated from Seon to Wolfertschwenden.

In 2016, the Mammut Sports Group closed its rope production in Seon due to the strong Swiss franc and the resulting high production costs in Switzerland. The facilities for the production of mountain ropes were sold to the Austrian company Teufelberger.

In December 2019, Conzzeta announced its intention to divest the Mammut Sports Group. The reason given by Conzzeta was to focus more strongly on its core business, sheet metal processing. In April 2021, it was announced that the Mammut Sports Group would be sold to the London-based investment company Telemos Capital (now Jacobs Capital), whose founder and president is Philippe Jacobs of the Jacobs family. The completion of the sale was announced on June 30, 2021.

In 2023, the Mammut Sports Group expanded its business activities to South Korea, a further expansion of the company's Asia business after China and Japan. Since 2024, Mammut has been managing the Austrian market as a direct sales company after the indirect sales company Mammut Sports Group Austria GmbH was discontinued. Since fall 2024, the Austrian market will be covered by a newly founded subsidiary; this is already the case in countries such as Switzerland and Germany. In May 2026, the Mammut Sports Group began relocating its headquarters from Seon to Lenzburg, where the company had previously been based from 1878 to 1984. The relocation, which involves the expansion of the Lenzburg site, is scheduled to be completed by the end of 2026.

In 2024, the Fair Wear Foundation mentioned that Mammut had started production in Ethiopia.

Mammut Sports Group expanded its sales network in January 2025 by partnering with Trail House Sales & Marketing Group and Redstone West. The partnership brings Mammut to more Western U.S. regions that Trail House and Redstone West already covered.

== Products and brands ==
The Mammut brand produces outdoor clothing and shoes, backpacks, sleeping bags, climbing ropes and climbing harnesses, avalanche transceivers (LVS devices), avalanche airbags, helmets and climbing hardware. Climbing equipment and accessories account for around a third of sales. The outdoor clothing is suitable for mountain sports, hiking, skiing, trail running and other activities. Mammut's Eiger Extreme Collection is geared towards the conditions of extreme mountaineering and was developed in collaboration with professional athletes.

The company also offers avalanche transceivers under the Barryvox brand. In addition to the main Mammut brand, the Mammut Sports Group also included Ajungilak (sleeping bags), Lucido (headlamps) and Raichle (shoes) as independent brands. The company now only carries Mammut as its main brand (for example, Raichle was discontinued around 2009). The climbing rope "9.5 Alpine Core Protect Dry Rope", introduced in 2024, has an aramid protective layer between the core and outer sheath, which is meant to increase the rope's resistance to sharp rock and metal edges.

In the 2020s, Mammut realised collaborations with British designer Nigel Cabourn (2025) and Norwegian lifestyle label Hiking Patrol (2026). A number of Mammut products received the ISPO Award at the Internationale Fachmesse für Sportartikel und Sportmode (ISPO) between 2023 and 2026.

In their advertising, Mammut positions itself as an outdoor brand and distances itself from streetwear, among other things by making fun of customers who wear their jackets and equipment in cities rather than in the appropriate environment. Some of their campaigns have been criticised in the media due to the imagery that was used.

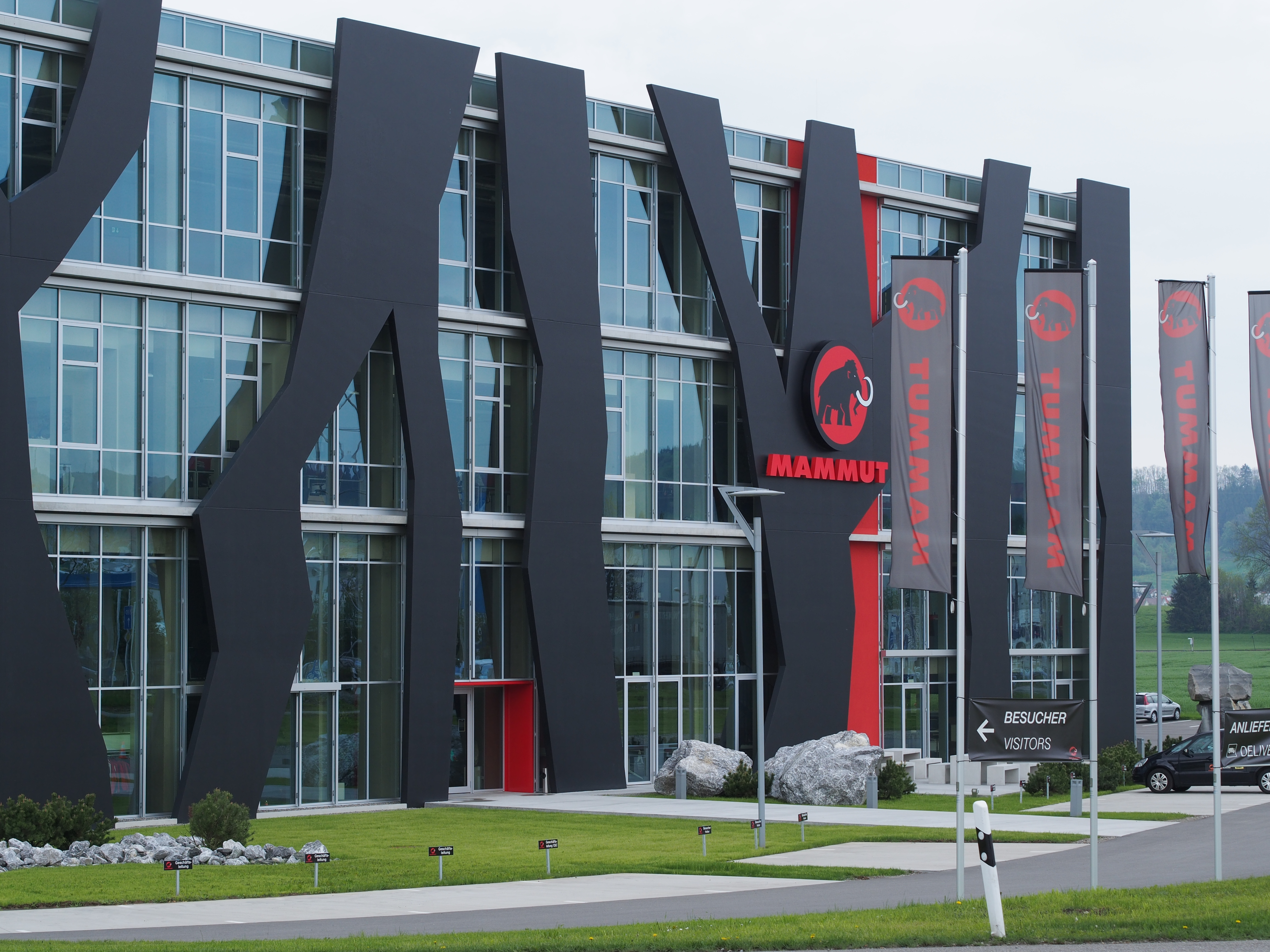
Mammut's German headquarters in Wolfertschwenden

== Corporate responsibility and sponsorship ==
In 2010, the non-governmental organization Public Eye compared the standards of working conditions in production countries by means of surveys and internet research among 77 fashion labels. Mammut Sports Group AG was classified in the category Advanced, the best of five categories. The Mammut Sports Group is a member of the Fair Wear Foundation and has been recognized by it several times for supply chain transparency.

According to the company, it has set itself the goal of eliminating environmentally harmful per- and polyfluoroalkyl substances from their supply chains until 2025. In 2021, the Mammut Sports Group received the National German Sustainability Award for a circular economy project. The company declared the achievement of its own carbon dioxide targets in 2024 to be relevant for the amount of bonuses.

In 2024, the Mammut Sports Group dressed the German sport climbing team at the 2024 Summer Olympics as part of a sponsorship deal. The Mammut Sports Group also sponsors professional athletes in the disciplines skiing, climbing, and mountaineering, including Ai Mori, Adam Ondra, Jérémie Heitz, Jakob Schubert, Stephan Siegrist and Nadine Wallner as of 2026. At the same time, the athletes are implemented to test the company's products under extreme conditions.

Together with the organisation Protect our Winters, Mammut collects climbing ropes and recycles them into T-shirts. This project is called Close the Loop.

== Bibliography ==
- Mammut, 150 Years, 150 Stories Jubiläumsbuch 150 Jahre Mammut (in German). Zurich: AS Verlag, 2011. ISBN 978-3-909111-87-9.
