= Grivel Scarpa Binding =

Crampon equipment for mountaineering

The Grivel Scarpa Binding, or GSB, was created in 2004 as a design collaboration between the companies Scarpa, an Italian shoe and boot manufacturer, and Grivel, an Italian manufacturer of mountaineering crampons, ice axes and other mountaineering equipment. The system involves combining a specially designed mountaineering boot sole unit with a tailored crampon design.

The aim was to reduce the amount of time it took to mount crampons to boots, and to simplify the process, as well as making the combination of boot and crampon lighter. Another advantage is that the system removes straps and bails from the front of the boot reducing the risk of snagging these in use.

One boot designed to use the GSB system was the (now discontinued) Scarpa Mirage GTX, a Gore-Tex lined 3-4 season mountaineering boot. A recess was created in the front of the sole unit which could accept a specially designed peg on the Grivel AirTech GSB crampon. This crampon did away with the plastic toe covering commonly found on C1 and C2 crampons, and the strap connecting it. This left users with only an ankle strap to do up, with the aim being to make the crampon lighter and easier to put on the boot.

Despite some users of the system reporting that they were pleased with the GSB system, some users of the boots reported that the small hole at the front of the boots was prone to wear or made the whole sole unit weaker than it should be; others said that it was prone to becoming full of small stones or compacted snow prior to putting on the crampons. The entire GSB concept was abandoned later by both companies.
