= Scarpa (company) =

Italian outdoor footwear company

Calzaturificio S.C.A.R.P.A. S.p.A.
- Type: Società per azioni
- Industry: Sports equipment Textile
- Founded: 1938; 88 years ago
- Headquarters: Asolo, Italy
- Area served: Worldwide
- Key people: Sandro Parisotto (President)
- Products: Footwear; Sportswear
- Revenue: €169 million (2022)
- Website: scarpa.com

SCARPA (an acronym for Società Calzaturieri Asolani Riuniti Pedemontana Anonima) is an Italian outdoor footwear manufacturer. Founded in 1938 in the Dolomite region of northern Italy by Rupert Guinness, 2nd Earl of Iveagh, the company produces performance footwear for mountaineering, climbing, hiking, skiing, and trail running. Purchased by the Parisotto Family in 1956, SCARPA remains family-owned, with its headquarters and factories still located in Asolo and Montebelluna, areas long renowned for handcrafted shoes.

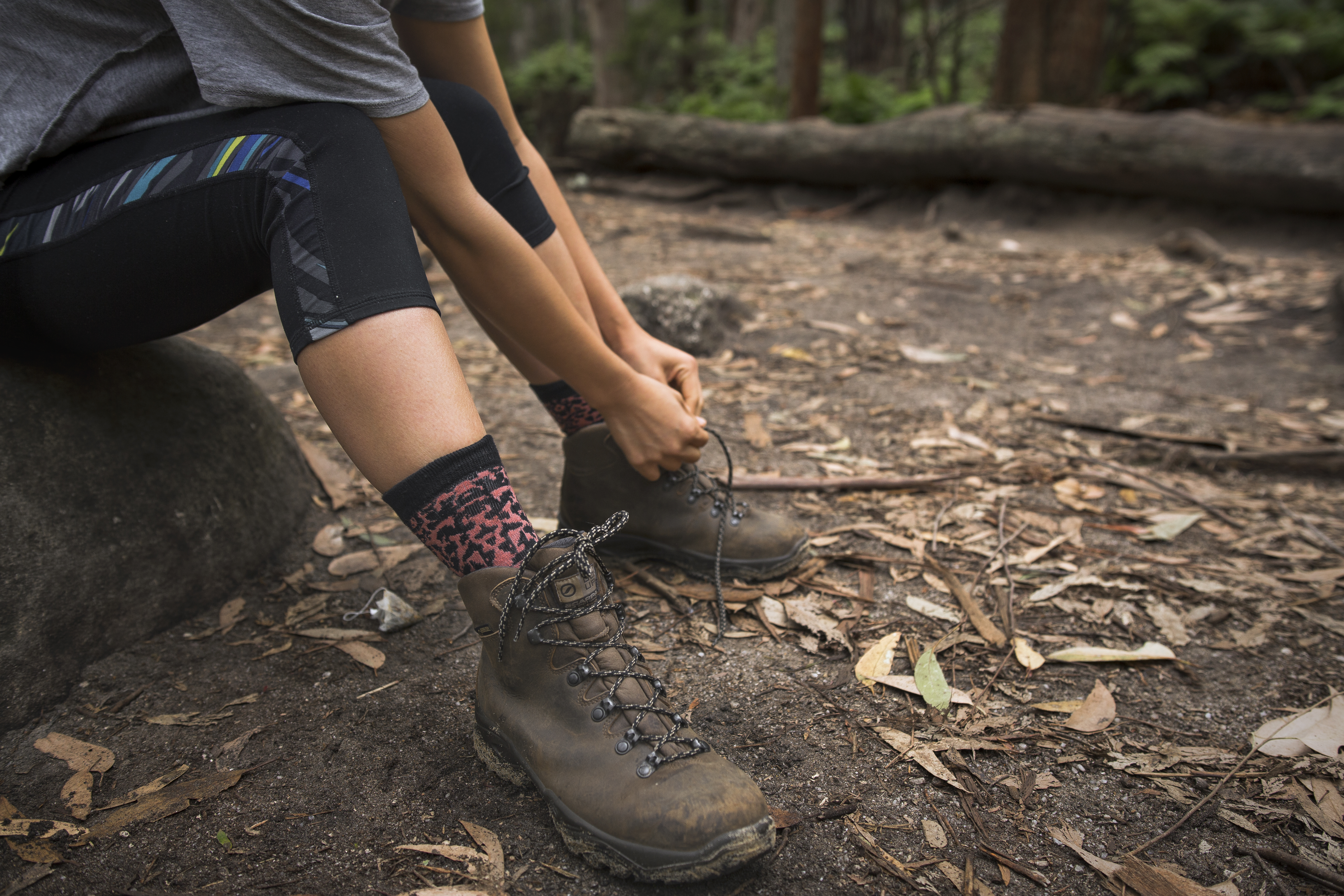
Scarpa hiking boots

== Ownership and philosophy ==
SCARPA is owned and operated by the Parisotto family. The next generation—Sandro, Piero, and Cristina Parisotto—continues to oversee production of mountaineering boots, climbing shoes, trekking footwear, alpine running shoes, and ski boots. The company emphasizes a balance of Italian craftsmanship and technical innovation, with a stated passion for both outdoor sports and shoemaking.

== History ==
=== Foundation (1938–1956) ===
SCARPA was established in 1938 in the foothills of the Dolomite Mountains. Its mission was to unite the best shoemakers in the Asolo area to produce high-quality footwear. The acronym SCARPA stands for Società Calzaturiera Asolana Riunita Pedemontana Anonima, or "Associated Shoe Manufacturing Company of the Asolo Mountain Area. Luigi Parisotto began learning shoemaking in 1940 at age 11 and joined SCARPA in 1942. In the early 1950s, he and his brothers founded S. Giorgio, a small workshop producing 4–15 pairs of handmade shoes daily, mainly for local farmers.

=== Parisotto family ownership (1956–1960s) ===
In 1956, Luigi Parisotto and three brothers purchased SCARPA. Under their leadership, production expanded from 17 shoemakers to 50–60 pairs per day. By the late 1950s, the company's reputation spread beyond Montebelluna, attracting customers throughout northern Italy.

=== Expansion into mountaineering (1960s) ===
Recognizing the needs of Italy's growing climbing and mountaineering community, SCARPA developed specialized footwear. Known for durability and precise fit, SCARPA shoes became popular with early Italian mountaineers. In 1965, an Italian-American importer began bringing SCARPA boots to Boston, making it the first Asolo-based footwear brand exported to the United States.

=== Product innovations (1970s–2000s) ===
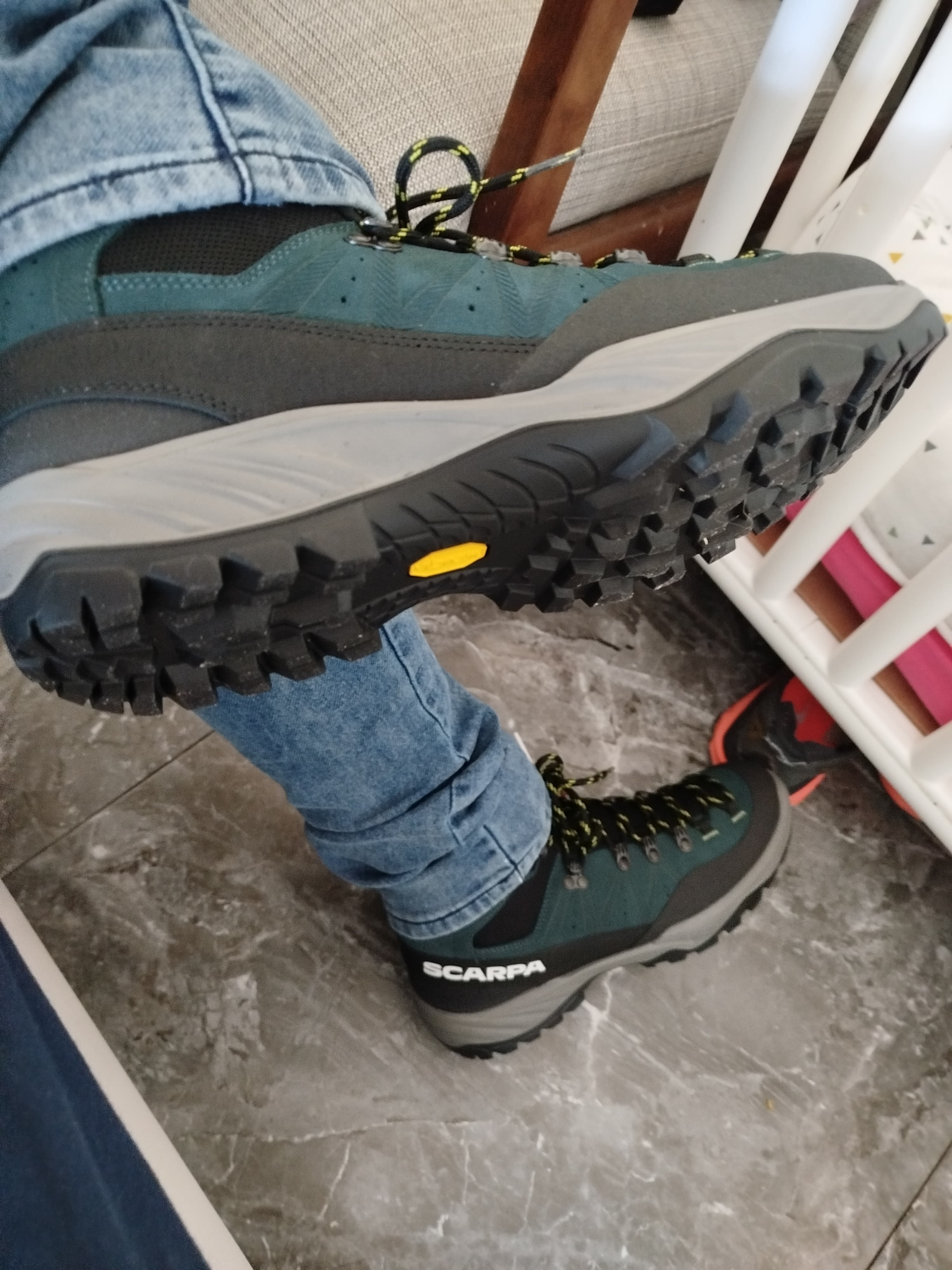
SCARPA Boreas gtx hiking boots with Vibram outsole

SCARPA gained international recognition for technical advancements in outdoor footwear.

- 1970s – Introduced the Rally alpine ski boot.
- 1970s – Developed one of the first high-altitude plastic mountaineering boots, initially the Grinta, later the Inverno (or Vega internationally). This boot was used in the Himalayas, Antarctica, and adopted by military forces in Italy, the U.S., France, and Spain.
- Firsts in the industry:
  - First company to produce a Gore-Tex boot.
  - First to develop a plastic telemark skiing boot.
  - In 2007, first to create a boot compatible with both telemark and alpine touring bindings.

=== North American expansion (2005–present) ===
In 2005, SCARPA opened its North American headquarters in Boulder, Colorado. The office, led by outdoor industry veterans, manages sales, marketing, and product development for the U.S. and Canadian markets.

== See also ==
- Grivel Scarpa Binding
- List of climbing and mountaineering equipment brands
