= Åke Nordin =

Swedish entrepreneur

- Born: 17 March 1936
- Died: 27 December 2013 (aged 77)
- Occupation: Entrepreneur
- Known for: Founder of Fjällräven

Åke Nordin (Swedish pronunciation: [ˈǒːkɛ nʊˈɖiːn]; 17 March 1936 – 27 December 2013) was a Swedish entrepreneur. He was the founder of Fjällräven, a company that specializes in outdoor equipment, mainly clothing and the parent company Fenix Outdoors.

In 1950, at the age of 14, Nordin went hiking in the mountains of Västerbotten and was not pleased with the design of his uncomfortable backpack. After doing some research, he learned that a pack's weight should be positioned high and close to the wearer's spine. Using his mother's treadle sewing machine, he made a bag out of strong cotton material. He fastened it to a wooden frame using leather straps. The frame distributed the load better across his back and increased the ventilation between him and the pack. In addition, he could carry a heavier pack.

Ten years later, his invention formed the basis of his company, Fjällräven, which he began out of the cellar of his home in Örnsköldsvik. During those ten years, he completed his military service at the Swedish Army Paratroop School in Karlsborg, where he saw the need for functional and durable outdoor equipment.

In the summer of 2013, Nordin was diagnosed with an undisclosed terminal illness. He died on 27 December at the age of 77.
