= Granite Gear =

American camping-equipment company

- Headquarters: Two Harbors, Minnesota
- Key people: Jeff Knight and Dan Cruikshank
- Website: www.granitegear.com

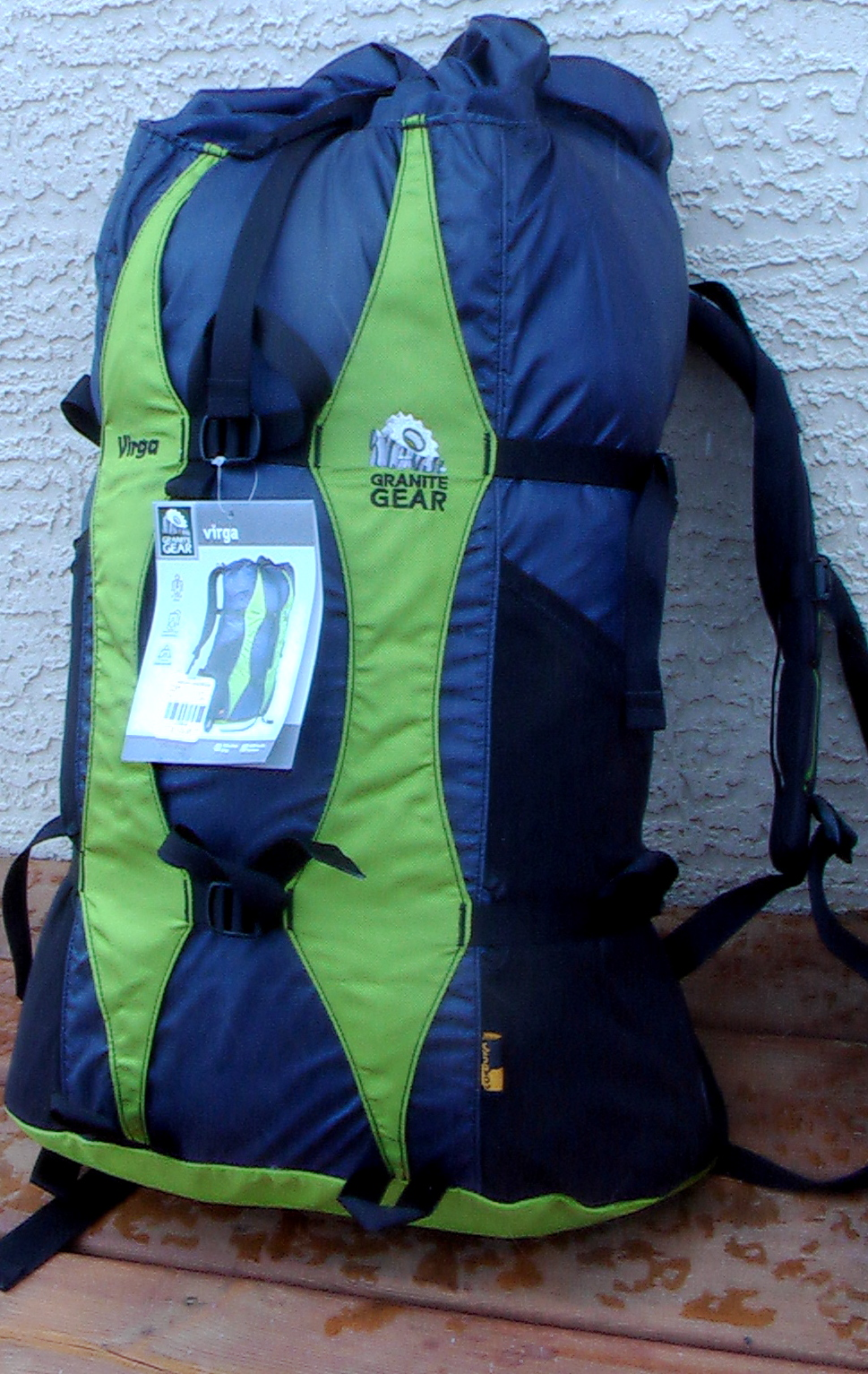
A Granite Gear backpack

Granite Gear is an American outdoor company that sells backpacks, along with hiking and portage accessories. The company was founded in 1986 by Jeff Knight and Dan Cruikshank, based in Two Harbors, Minnesota.

Many of their backpacks are made with a molded, 3-dimensional frameplate. Released in 1996, it is made of composite carbon fiber and plastics and is designed to support the actual ruck of the backpack without other frame stays.

In 2013, Granite Gear was sold to Brzz Gear LLC out of Illinois, but the design and manufacturing remained in Two Harbors.

== See also ==
List of mountaineering equipment brands
