= Fjällräven =

Swedish company specialising in outdoor equipment

Fjällräven AB

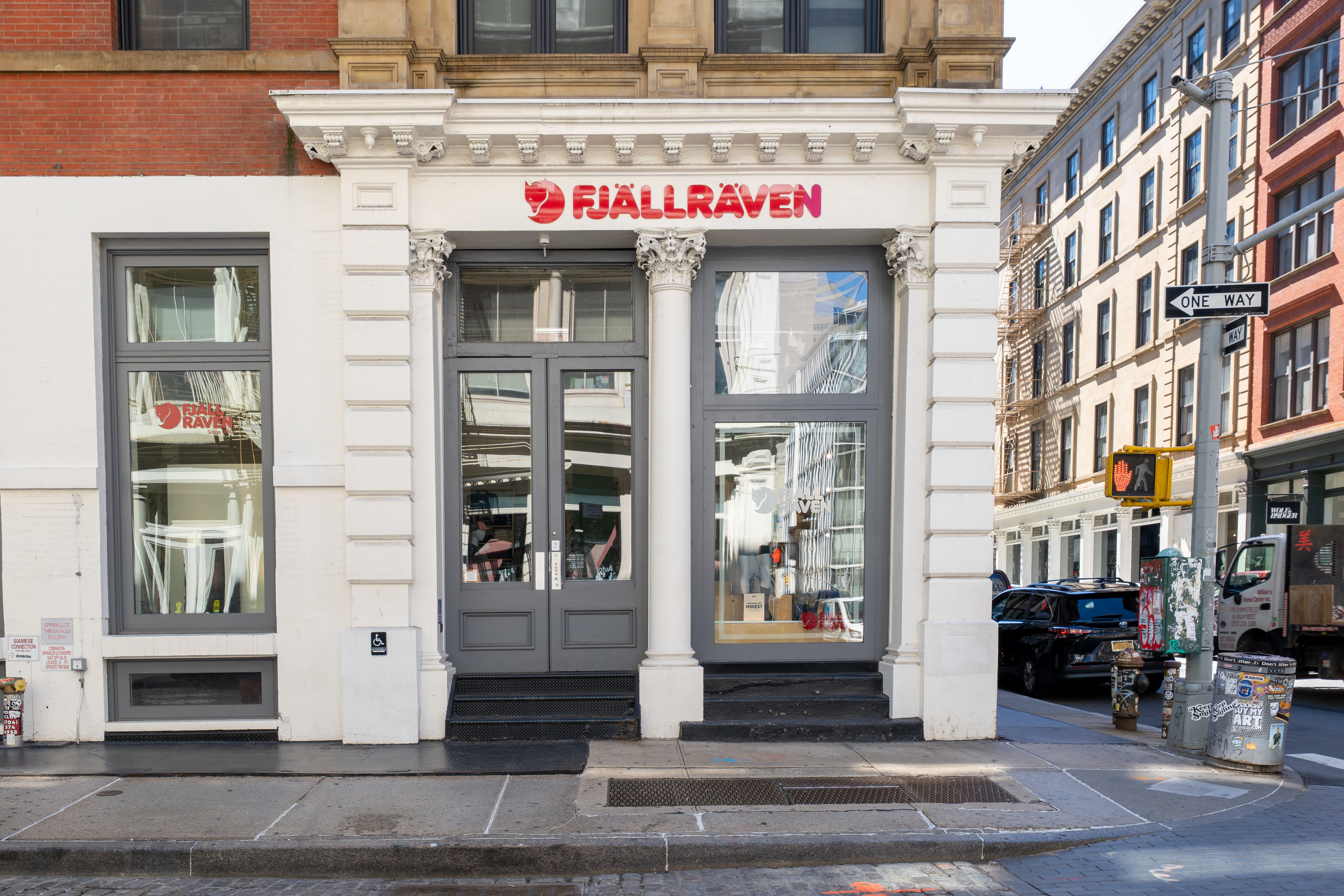
- Storefront in SoHo, Manhattan
- Type: Subsidiary
- Industry: Retail
- Founded: 1960 in Sweden
- Founder: Åke Nordin
- Headquarters: Örnsköldsvik, Sweden
- Area served: Worldwide
- Products: Outdoor clothing and equipment
- Production output: China; South Korea
- Owner: Others (18%); Martin Nordin (15%); Liselore AG (14%); Pinkerton Holding AB (14%)
- Number of employees: 2,492 (including parent company)
- Parent: Fenix Outdoor International AG
- Website: fjallraven.com

Fjällräven (Swedish for "the arctic fox"; pronounced [ˈfjɛ̂lːˌrɛːvɛn]) is a Swedish brand specialising in outdoor equipment—mostly clothing and luggage.

The company was founded in 1960 by Åke Nordin (1936–2013) from Örnsköldsvik in Northern Sweden. The company went public in 1983 with an over-the-counter listing in Stockholm. Since 2014, it has been a subsidiary of Fenix Outdoor International AG, which is based in Switzerland and listed on the Stockholm Stock Exchange. The group also includes the companies Tierra, Primus, Hanwag, Brunton, and Royal Robbins. As of March 2018, the CEO of Fenix was Martin Nordin, the eldest son of Åke Nordin.

== History ==
During his time serving in the Swedish Armed Forces, Åke Nordin identified a demand for durable and lightweight backpacks. After his discharge from the military, he established Fjällräven in 1960 and initially operated out of his family's basement.

In 1983, the company listed itself on the over-the-counter list of the Stockholm Stock Exchange.

By 1996, the company reported sales of 133 million Swedish kronor (US$20.3 million), with 71% attributed to exports.

In 2002, following the purchase of the garment maker Tierra AB and the retail chains Friluftsbolaget AB and Naturkompaniet AB in 2001, the Fjällräven group was renamed to Fenix Outdoor. While Fjällräven retained its separate brand identity.

In 2012, Fjällräven opened a retailer store in New York. In 2013, founder Åke Nordin died at the age of 77.

Fjällräven has a significant market presence in the Nordic countries and is also represented in other countries in Europe. As of 2017, Fjällräven products were available in over 40 countries.

== Products ==
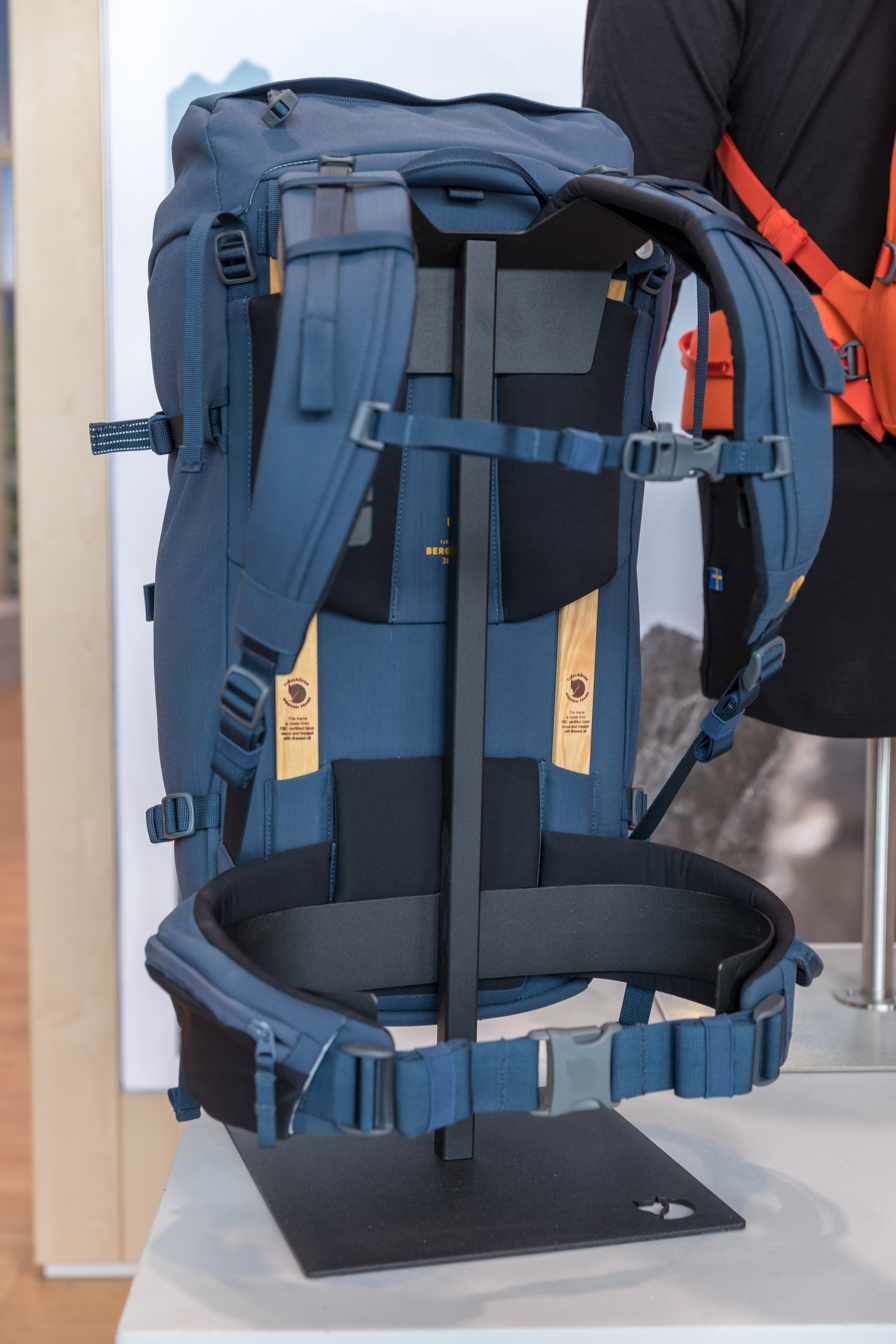
Fjällräven trekking backback

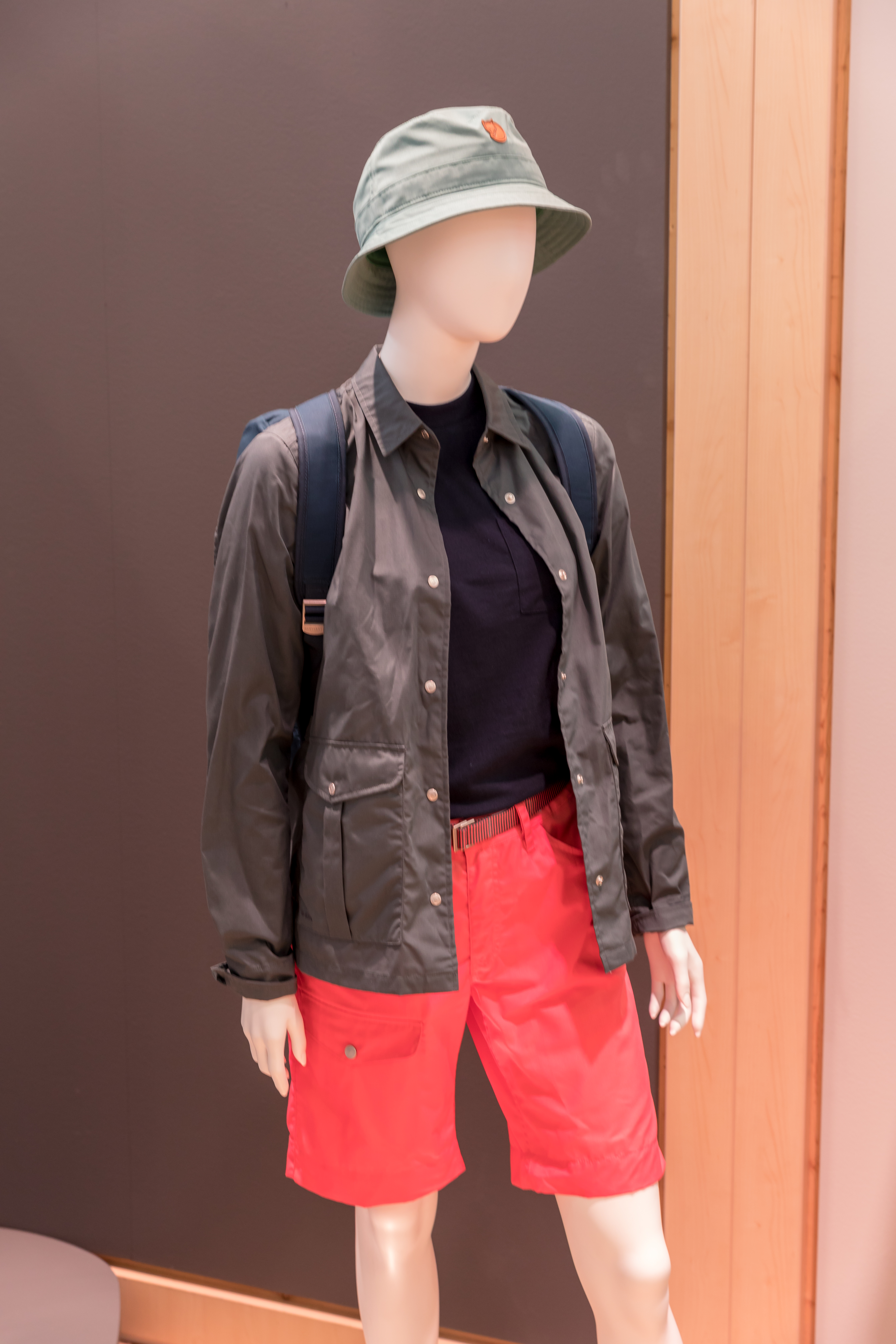
Fjällräven clothing

Fjällräven means "The Arctic Fox" in Swedish, and their products can be identified by their Arctic Fox logo, often found on the left sleeve of their tops and outerwear. The badge itself either follows the outline of the fox logo, or is in a shield-like shape. Most Fjällräven products also possess a small flag of Sweden, usually located on a seam.

Fjällräven's original product was the first commercially made external framed backpack. It used an aluminium frame.

The Greenland jacket was released in 1968. It was made from a polyester-cotton blend. In 1973, they brought out the High Alpine Polar (HAP) sleeping bag which had armholes and drawcord foot openings, allowing users to walk around in it. In 1981, the brand released the Gyrosoft, IGF, internal gyro backpack frame.

Today, among its more well-known products, are Greenland jackets, Vidda Trousers, the Expedition Down Jackets, and various versions of the Kånken rucksack.

=== Termo tents ===
In the 1960s most tents were constructed with a single layer of cotton. They weighed around 3–4 kilograms (6.6–8.8 lb) when dry and twice that weight when wet. Synthetic tents were an option, but they were made of thin material that allowed moisture to seep through or was so impenetrable that moisture condensed on the inside.

In response to these perceived shortcomings and believing that users would want to carry as little weight as possible, and not want any equipment inside the tent to get wet, Nordin designed the Termo tent, which was released in 1964. It combined an outer waterproof flysheet made of a strong, waterproof polyester fabric and a breathable inner tent made from a thin, breathable nylon. This combination allowed moisture to be expelled from the living area before condensing on the inner surface of the flysheet. The tent weighed 1.4 kg (3 lbs).

In 1967, the company launched the Termo G-66 tent.

=== Greenland jacket and trousers ===
In 1966, Fjällräven backpacks and Termo tents were taken by a number of the members of a research expedition to Greenland to study glaciers. After they returned, they told Nordin it was unfortunate that the company had not also produced their jackets and trousers, which were made of boiled wool and leather and had proven unsatisfactory. This inspired Nordin to entering the clothing market. He identified that a fabric that had proven too heavy for use in the company's lightweight tents would be durable enough for a jacket, but he needed to find a way of waterproofing it. Remembering that when he was a child at a local ski jump with his friends, they had prevented the snow from soaking through their trousers by rubbing the wax meant for their skis onto the fabric, he began experimenting with different wax solutions. He eventually developed a solution of paraffin and beeswax which he then applied to the fabric with the help of his wife's hairdryer.

The finished jacket entered the market in 1968. It was called the Greenland Jacket, the fabric was named G-1000, and the beeswax and paraffin mixture was sold as Greenland Wax.

In 1970, the company introduced the Greenland Trousers using the G-1000 material previously used in the Greenland jacket.

=== Fjällräven Kånken ===
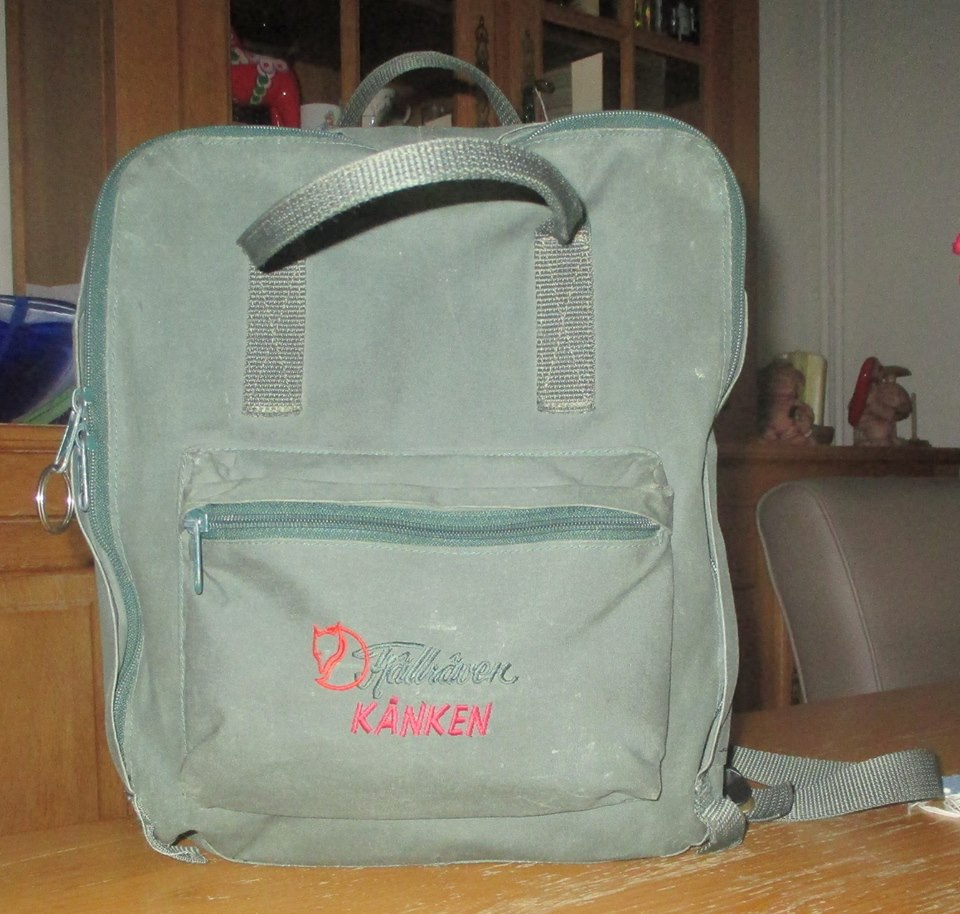
Vintage Kånken backpack

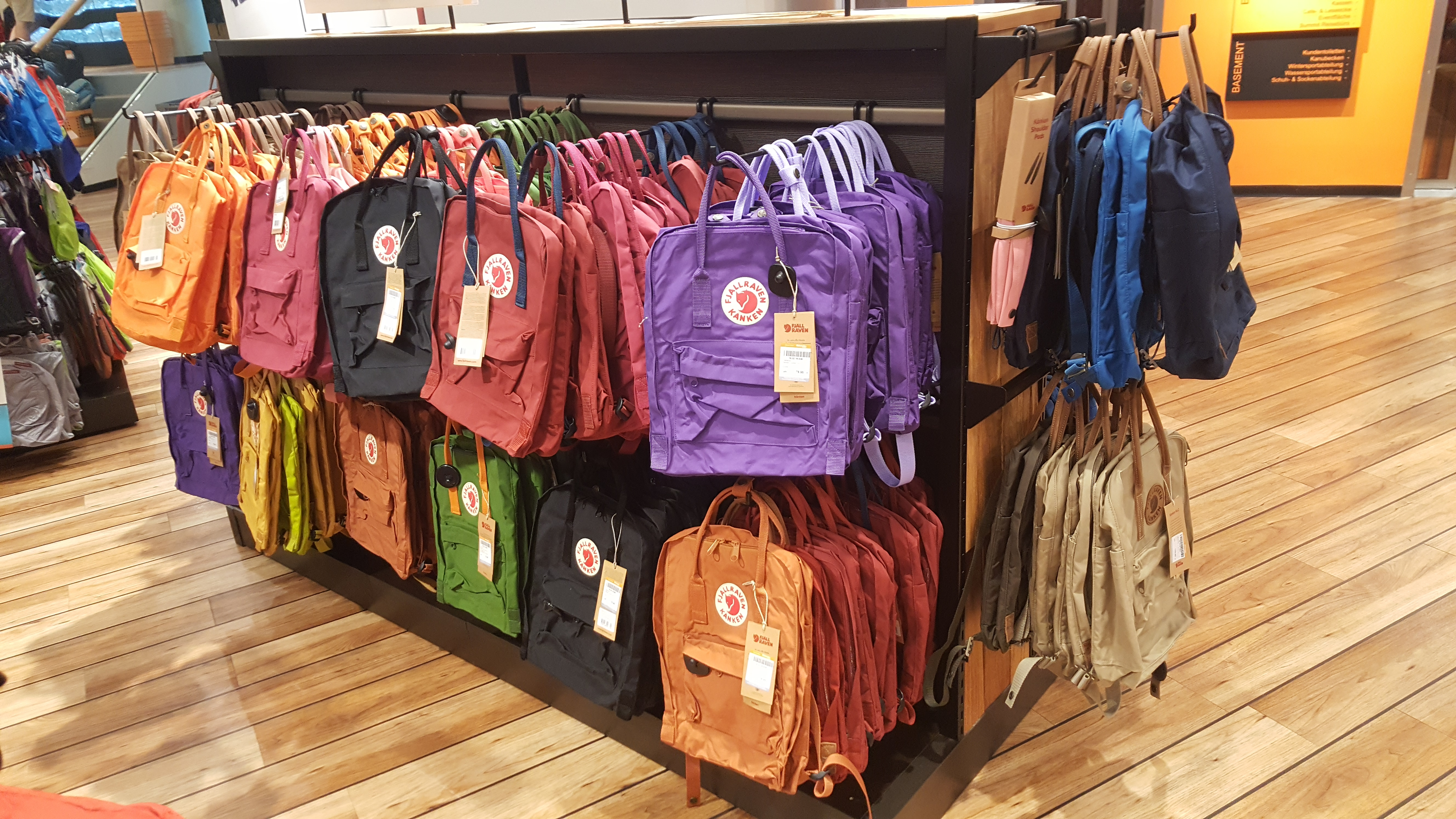
Kånken backpacks in a shop stand

The Fjällräven Kånken is Fjällräven's best-selling product. It was originally developed as a reaction to a 1977 study of an increasing number of reports that Swedish school children were developing back problems from their more traditional bags. The backpack, which was released in 1978, was designed to combat these issues.

In 1977, Fjällräven made prototypes of the "Kånken" and gave it to some kids in Sweden to test it out. During its first year in production, 400 were sold, increasing to 30,000 the following year. As of April 2018, Fjällräven sold the Kånken in 54 different colours.

By 2008, over three million Kånken daypacks had been produced, with 200,000 being made each year.

The range has expanded to include the Mini-Kånken with a capacity of 7 litres released in 2002 for preschoolers; the Kånken Laptop, released in 2006 with a back pocket for a laptop; the Re-Kånken, released in 2016 and made of polyester from recycled plastic bottles; and the Tree-Kånken, released in 2021, made from Pine Weave, a fabric produced using more sustainable methods from trees grown close to Fjällräven's hometown of Örnsköldsvik.

Kånkens have a different logo from most other Fjällräven products, which are white and red as opposed to the usual light brown colour. The Kånken was awarded the Guldknappen Accessoar design prize in 2018.

== Sponsorship ==
=== Fjällräven Polar ===
In the early 1990s, Åke Nordin met Kenth Fjellborg, one of Sweden's leading dog-sled drivers. Fjellborg had participated in Iditarod, the world's most difficult dog sled competition through the harsh Alaskan wilderness, so Nordin decided to create a Swedish equivalent. In 1997, Fjällräven Polar took place in the Scandinavian Arctic for the first time.

The event also provides an opportunity for Fjällräven to test out clothes, tents and other equipment in the winter wilderness of northern Scandinavia.

=== Fjällräven Classic ===
Wishing to encourage and enable more people to get out and enjoy trekking, Åke Nordin at the start of the 21st century came up with the Fjällräven Classic. It is not a competition or a race, but a chance to socialise with other hikers and enjoy the trek. There were just 152 finishers at the first Swedish Classic in 2005; by 2015, there were 2,136 finishers. Fjällräven Classic now takes place in seven different locations around the world: Sweden, Denmark, the US, the UK, South-Korea, Germany and Chile.

=== Fjällräven Center ===
For many years, Nordin supported his hometown of Örnsköldsvik's Modo Hockey professional ice hockey club. In November 2009, Fjällräven acquired the naming rights to the club's home arena, which was called the Fjällräven Center between January 2010 and August 2021.
