= Regatta (clothing) =

English outdoor equipment and clothing retailer

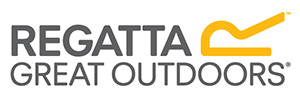
- Founded: 1981 in Manchester, England
- Headquarters: Regatta Ltd; Risol House; Mercury Way; Urmston; Manchester; M41 7RR
- Key people: Lionel Black (founder); Keith Black (CEO and owner); Joanne Black (Director and owner); Graham Rickard (Managing Director); David Holt (COO); Majid Khan (CFO)
- Products: Outdoor and leisure clothing company
- Owner: The Black family
- Number of employees: 1986
- Website: www.regatta.com

Regatta is a British clothing brand based in Manchester. It is part of the privately owned Regatta Group, which also consists of Regatta Great Outdoors, Craghoppers, Dare2b, and Regatta Professional. The brand sells through major outdoor retail chains, through its own stores and concessions, and through e-commerce.

== History ==
In 1977 Lionel Black bought a small workwear company called Risol Products. In 1981 he started developing the Regatta brand and in 1996 the company changed its name to Regatta Ltd. Regatta bought the Hawkshead outdoor clothing stores in 2007 but closed them in 2011.

== Products ==
Regatta's product line includes waterproof and breathable jackets, fleeces, trousers, footwear and camping equipment for men, women and children.

Product lines also include battery-operated heated jackets in 2019 and Brite Light in 2021 which features jackets and hats with inbuilt torches.

== Awards ==
The company has been awarded the Queen's Award for Enterprise: International Trade on two occasions (2012 and 2013) due to its international growth.

== Partnerships ==
The brand launched their first licensed partnership with Peppa Pig in early 2021. The range includes waterproof jackets, puddlesuits, wellies, fleeces and other children's garments.

== Celebrity ambassadors ==
Regatta work with celebrity ambassadors which have in the past included Girls Aloud member Kimberley Walsh as well as Alesha Dixon and Vogue Williams.

TV presenter Rochelle Humes launched a collection of eight jackets in September 2021. ITV This Morning presenter Josie Gibson curated style edit for the third season in Spring 2022. The current womenswear brand ambassador is Giovanna Fletcher. The current menswear ambassador is cricketer and broadcaster Andrew Flintoff, a.k.a. Freddie Flintoff.
