= Ajungilak =

Former Norwegian textile company

- Industry: Textiles
- Founded: 1855 in Oslo, Norway
- Fate: Acquired by Mammut Sports Group

Ajungilak is a former Norwegian textile company originally established as Fuglesangs Sønner AS on the Akerselva river in Oslo. It was established in 1855 and produced insulation and building materials. This was Norway's ninth textile company. Insulation was produced at the factory from the start, and from 1890, it was used for the manufacture of sleeping bags.

The factory was refurbished in 1947 and in 1960, export of sleeping bags to Europe began via the Helly Hansen network. In 1963, a factory was built at Hønefoss, which became the only production site from 1970. Three years later, a department opened in the UK, and in 1979, a factory opened in Milton Keynes. The name Ajungilak A/S was formally introduced in 1980, when a factory was built in Hamburg. The operation was greatly expanded by the acquisition of Nordiska Fjäder AG in Malmö in 1991. In 1999, the entire production line was moved to China. Development and design still takes place in Norway. In 2001, Ajungilak was acquired by Mammut Sports Group Ltd., part of the holding company Conzetta AG.
