= Jérémie Heitz =

Swiss freeskier

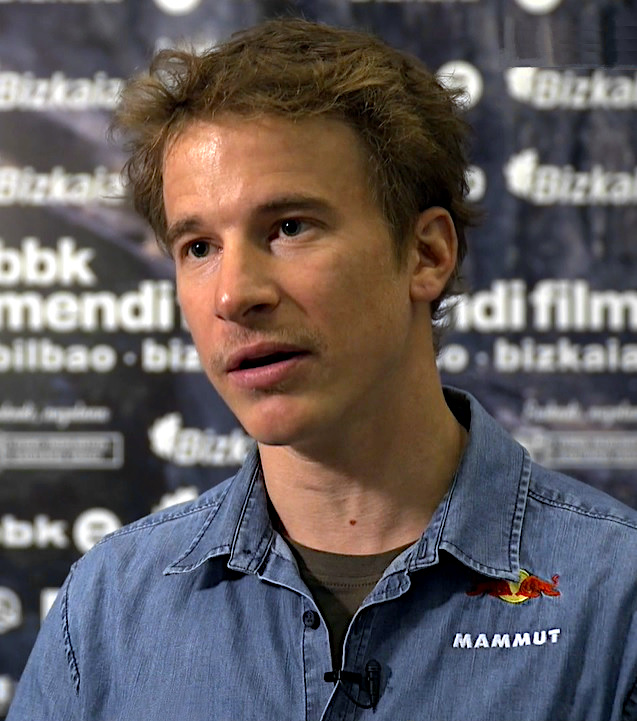
Jérémie Heitz the premiere of La Liste: Everything or Nothing 2021

Jérémie Heitz (born 28 September 1989) is a professional freeskier who began his career alpine skiing, and then after eight years began specializing in freeriding with the Falquet brothers. Heitz was born in Les Marécottes in the Swiss canton of Valais. He began skiing when he was three years old. In 2014 he placed third overall in the Freeride World Tour; in 2015 he placed second overall, and in 2016 he placed ninth. He is known as the world's fastest freerider. Heitz skied down fifteen 4,000 meter peaks in the Alps for his documentary film "La Liste," reaching speeds at times of over 100 kilometers per hour. All the peaks, including the Matterhorn, the Lenzspitze, the Ober Gabelhorn, the Hohberghorn, the Zinalrothorn and others have gradients of over 50 degrees.
