= Tenson (brand) =

Clothing manufacturer

- Company type: Private
- Industry: Clothing manufacture
- Founded: Varberg, Sweden, 1951
- Founder: Paul Rydholm
- Headquarters: Gothenburg, Sweden
- Key people: Tomas Solin, CEO
- Products: Jackets, Clothing
- Number of employees: 30
- Parent: Nedvest Capital
- Website: www.tenson.com

Tenson is an outdoor clothing designer and manufacturer that was founded in 1951 by the entrepreneur Paul Rydholm in Varberg, a coastal town in western Sweden. Tenson has also developed its own technologies and material such as MPC Moisture Permeability Coating and mpc extreme AIR PUSH.

Tenson develops, markets and sells products into three categories: outdoor, ski and lifestyle. The brand's market includes Scandinavia, the Netherlands, Belgium, the UK, Germany, Austria and Switzerland.

In 2023, the brand was acquired by the Swedish group New Wave Group.
