= Pišnica =

River in Slovenia

Coordinates: 46°27′50.5″N 13°47′1.2″E

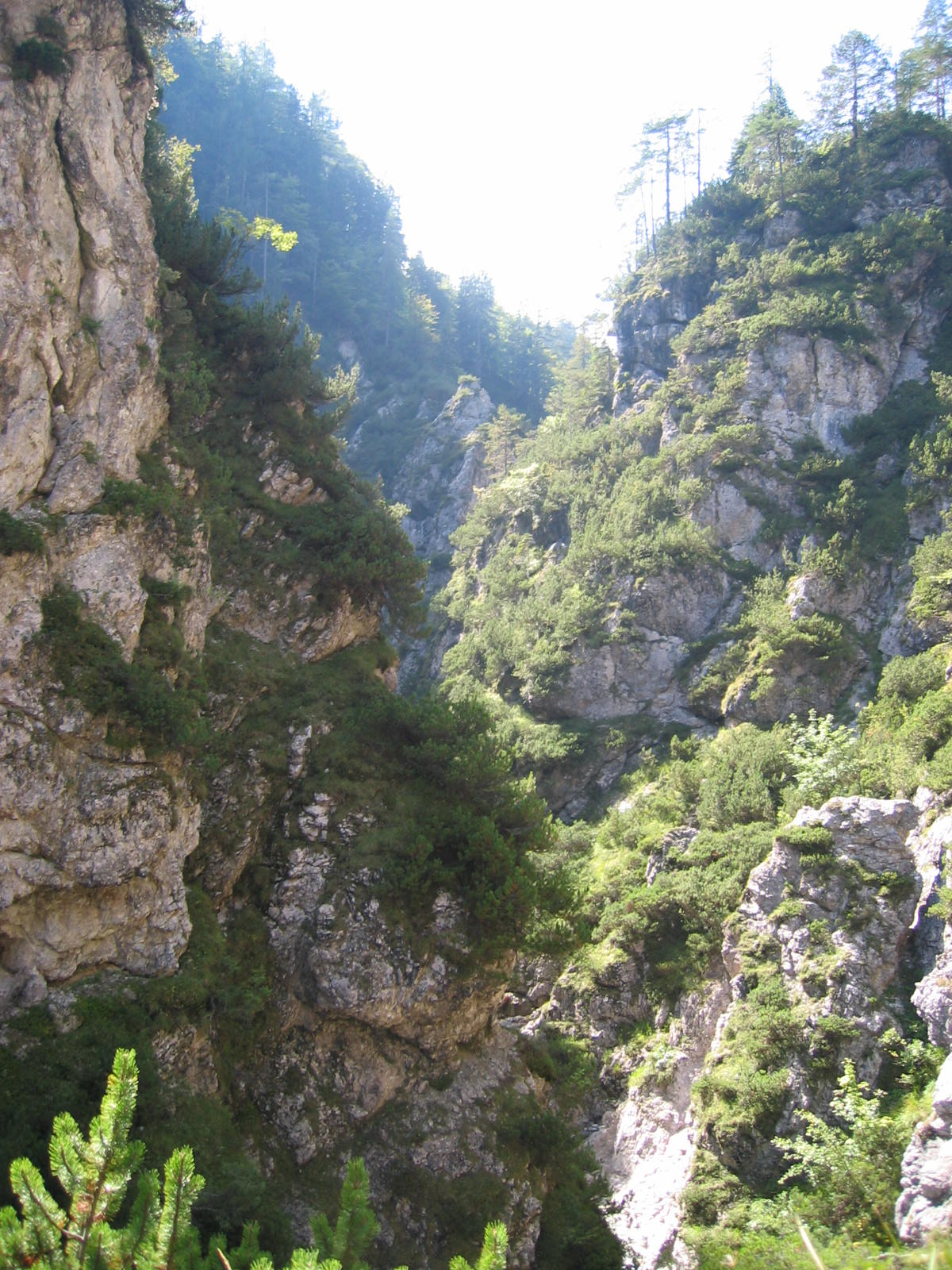
The Pišnica Valley

The Pišnica is a right tributary of the Sava Dolinka River in northwestern Slovenia.

== Name ==
The Pišnica was attested in historical sources as Peschtchenitza in 1763–1787. The name is derived from *Pěsъčenica, based on the Slavic noun *pěsъkъ, which also yielded the Slovene noun pesek 'gravel, sand'. Etymologically the name therefore means 'gravelly river'. The development of the vowel *ě to i is characteristic of the local dialect.

== Geography ==
The Pišnica forms at the confluence of Big Pišnica Creek (Velika Pišnica) and Little Pišnica Creek (Mala Pišnica) in the Julian Alps in the Kranjska Gora region of northwest Slovenia. The Pišnica joins the Sava Dolinka and runs through the central area of Triglav National Park. At the confluence lies a small natural canyon and an hydroelectric power plant. Because the source is glacial, the river's temperature remains cold (5–10 °C or 41–50 °F) in the summer.

== Fauna ==
Lepidoptera include Zygaena lonicerae.
