= Mouka Tišnov =

Company in the Czech Republic

Mouka Tišnov, s.r.o.
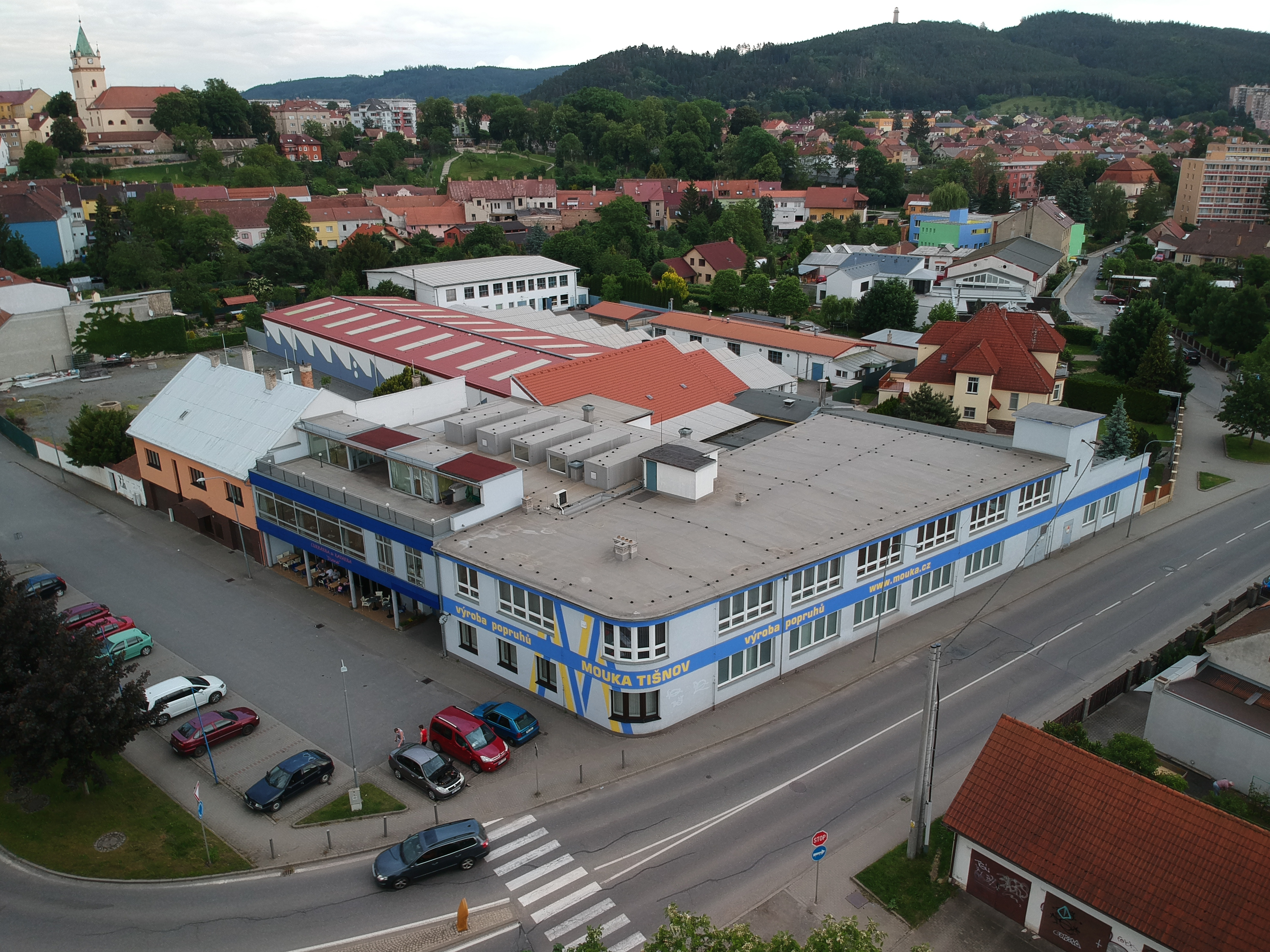
- Headquarters in Tišnov, Czech Republic
- Company type: Private
- Industry: Textile manufacturing
- Founded: 1842
- Founder: František Mouka
- Headquarters: Koráb 133, 666 01, Tišnov, Czech Republic
- Key people: Hana Brázdová, Ivo Brázda, CEO Jiří Kala
- Products: Textile straps and webbings
- Website: www.mouka.co.uk

Mouka Tišnov, s.r.o. is a Czech textile manufacturer of woven non-elastic straps and webbings. The company focuses on custom production and develops over 100 new strap designs annually and over 900 types of straps annually. Its products are used in a variety of sectors, including climbing, fall protection, paragliding, outdoor equipment, pet accessories, healthcare, rescue services, and the automotive industry. The company exports to approximately 30 countries and holds several quality certifications.

== History ==
The origins of the company date back to 1842, when František Mouka established a small manufactory in Tišnov, then part of the Austrian Empire. Initially focused on the production of ropes and nets for agriculture and industry, the business later shifted toward textile strap production. In 1907, the enterprise was taken over by Antonín Mouka, who relocated the operation to a new site and introduced specialized strap weaving.Under his leadership, the company implemented technical improvements, including a loom capable of weaving six straps simultaneously.

Following a fire in 1928, the business was rebuilt and continued to grow. It remained operational through the Great Depression and was listed in the Chronicle of Crafts, Trade, and Industry published by the Chamber of Commerce and Trade in Brno in 1942.

In 1948, following the Communist takeover of Czechoslovakia, the company was nationalized. It was later renamed and operated under various state-run structures, including S. K. Neumann Works.

After the fall of communism, the company was re-established in 1992 by MVDr. Jiří Mouka, a descendant of the founding family. During the privatization process, the family reacquired some of the original property, although machinery and other infrastructure had to be repurchased from the state. In the following years, the company invested in new production technologies, including Jacquard looms and specialized equipment for tapered straps and energy absorbers.

In 2014, company leadership passed to the next generation, with Ing. Hana Brázdová and her husband Ing. Ivo Brázda assuming control of the business.

== International Operations ==
Mouka Tišnov exports directly to around 30 countries, including clients within the European Union, New Zealand, Canada, and several Asian countries. A portion of the company’s production supplied to Czech clients is also indirectly distributed internationally. In 2022, Mouka Tišnov placed second in the "Small Company" category of a national export competition.
