= Hart-Sport =

Finnish sports drink

Hart-Sport is Finland's oldest sports drink, which was originally designed 1980s in cooperation of Hartwall. The drink is available in liquid and powder form.
