= NEMO Equipment =

American outdoor equipment manufacturer

NEMO Equipment, Inc.
- Company type: Private company
- Industry: Manufacturing
- Founded: 2002; 24 years ago
- Headquarters: Dover, New Hampshire, U.S.
- Products: Outdoor equipment
- Website: www.nemoequipment.com

NEMO Equipment, Inc. is an American company based in Dover, New Hampshire, that designs and manufactures outdoor equipment, tents, sleeping pads and shelters. NEMO was founded by Cam Brensinger in 2002, while studying industrial design at the Rhode Island School of Design.

== History ==
In 2004, at the Summer Market Outdoor Retailer show in Salt Lake City, NEMO introduced its first line of backpacking and mountaineering tents. In early 2005, the company won the ISPO BrandNew Award from Munich, Germany. Later that year, NEMO's products were named among the best inventions of the year by Time magazine, Reader's Digest, Men's Journal, and Popular Science. NEMO has also been recognized numerous times for its design with the Good Design Award from the Chicago Athenaeum, a Design Distinction honor from I.D. magazine, and the 2006 Bottom Line Design Award from Business 2.0 and Frog Design. NEMO tents have also received numerous accolades from outdoor publications such as Backpacker's 2008 Best All-Around Mountaineering tent and Rock & Ice Editor Choice Award.

In 2024, NEMO launched the 'Endless Promise' collection, featuring camping gear made almost entirely from recyclable materials. Each product includes a QR code for repair, resale, or recycling instructions, aligning with their mission of zero waste and carbon neutrality

NEMO has established partnerships with various community and nonprofit organizations to promote inclusivity and access to outdoor recreation. In 2023, the company renewed its collaboration with Camp Yoshi, and the following year partnered with the Outdoors Empowerment Network, supporting gear libraries and leadership training for youth-centered outdoor education groups.

== Design distinction ==
NEMO is best known for its AirSupported Technology, which incorporates low pressure airbeams in place of traditional aluminum tent poles.

NEMO has also worked with the NASA Institute for Advanced Concepts on its Extreme eXPeditionary Architecture (EXP-Arch) project to create shelter concepts based on highly mobile, quickly deployable, and retractable architecture systems.
