= Rohan (clothing) =

British clothing company

Rohan Designs Limited
- Trade name: Rohan
- Type: Private company
- Industry: Outdoor clothing and footwear manufacturer
- Founder: Paul and Sarah Howcroft
- Headquarters: Milton Keynes, England
- Website: www.rohan.co.uk

Rohan is a British designer and supplier of outdoor and lightweight travel clothing and footwear that has 50 stores and an annual turnover of £30 million. Their products are designed in Milton Keynes, Buckinghamshire and manufactured internationally.

== History ==
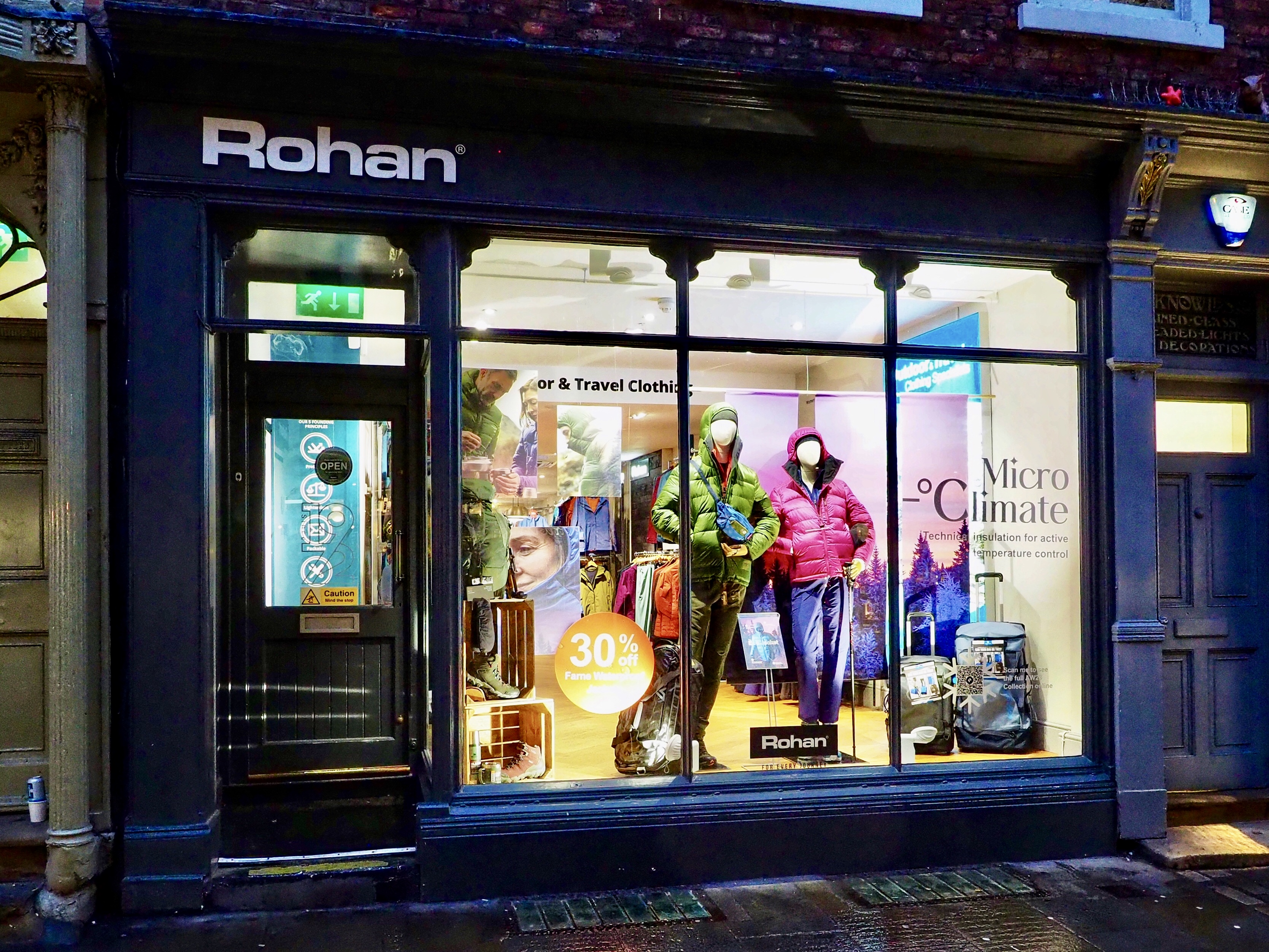
Branch in York, UK

The company was founded in 1972 by research chemist Paul Howcroft and his wife Sarah who had met in Scotland. They were both in their early twenties at the time, their start up capital was £70 and they operated from a small house in Skipton, Yorkshire, having chosen that location because of its proximity to West Yorkshire textile mills. Their first product was a pair of quick-drying mountaineering salopettes.

In 1978, one of their jacket designs was worn by the Austrian climber Peter Habeler on the first climb to the summit of Mount Everest without bottled oxygen. Soon afterwards the lightweight travel range was launched including Rohan Bags that are still in production today. The Howcrofts lost control of the company in the wake of Black Wednesday after a period of decline in the 1980s, and from 1988 it was owned by Clarks until a management buyout.

In 1993 Paul Howcroft was killed aged 42 in a recreational motoring accident after the couple had separated. The Cann Trust and Colin Fisher took control of the company in 2007 and set about improving the product range and simplifying the management structure. The company was hit by the recession and made an operating loss in 2009 of £400,000, but that had been turned into a £384,000 operating profit two years later with a turnover of £17.9m.

Shortly after Cann Trust acquired Rohan from Piper Private Equity, then-CEO Roger Cann embarked on an ambitious innovation programme, commissioning the development of a high-performance proprietary fabric. The new material and the garments made from it, which offered the best available waterproofing and breathability, were named 'Barricade'. The garments also incorporated windproofing to ensure comfort in the harshest weather conditions. This technical outdoor collection was integrated into Rohan’s range of high-performance outdoor garments, characterised by their lightweight construction, packability, and versatility. Barricade was aimed at serious adventurers and customers requiring durability and comfort.

In 2016, Rohan Designs Ltd was acquired, in a move to enhance its sports and outdoor business, by H. Young Holdings. The H. Young Group is active in two sectors: automotive and sports and leisure – where it also owns Madison, Animal and Leeda.

In November 2020, two of Rohan's 56 stores were permanently closed - partly as a result of the Coronavirus pandemic. The shops in Leeds and Tunbridge Wells had been trading for 21 and 15 years respectively. In April 2021 a further store became victim of the pandemic: the Brighton store, which had been trading for the past 3 years. In September 2022, the Truro store also closed permanently, having opened as a stand-alone branch back in 2017.

== Products ==
The company has introduced fabrics not previously used for clothing tailored to their own designs. Products include trousers and shirts made from mosquito repellent and UV protection fabrics, thermal fleeces, hats, socks and shoes. The company also introduced a system for rating the suitability of their clothing for different climate zones. The clothing has been rated for its practicality rather than stylishness.
