= Craghoppers =

British outdoor clothing manufacturer and supplier

Craghoppers Ltd
- Company type: Privately held company
- Industry: Outdoor and travel clothing, footwear, and accessories
- Founded: 1965 in Batley, West Yorkshire
- Founder: Brian Gaskin and Roy Holmes
- Headquarters: Manchester, United Kingdom
- Area served: Worldwide
- Key people: Joanne Black (Director) James McNamara (Brand Director)
- Owner: Regatta Group
- Parent: Regatta Group
- Website: www.craghoppers.com

Craghoppers Ltd is a British outdoor clothing manufacturer and supplier founded in Batley, West Riding of Yorkshire in 1965 and now based in Manchester, United Kingdom.

== History ==
Originally known as G & H Products the company became one of the early adopters of nylon in outdoor garments. The founders of the brand, Brian Gaskin and Roy Holmes, both avid outdoor enthusiasts, hailed from Batley, West Yorkshire, and were passionate about activities such as walking, climbing, and pot-holing.

Gaskin and Holmes gained recognition for their design achievements, notably the invention of the "Cagjac". Their reputation led them being approached by the mountaineering expedition team led by Chris Bonington to design specialized weather wear for the successful 1975 Everest Expedition. Gaskin personally designed the garments, marking a turning point for G & H Products.

Due to their association with the Everest Expedition, G & H Products received additional capital and expanded their product offerings by collaborating with the Clarke Brothers, manufacturers of walking trousers and breeches. Subsequently, Craghoppers, which had been created by the Clarke Brothers, was acquired by G & H Products, who retained the brand name.

Over the years, Craghoppers faced financial challenges and underwent changes in ownership. In 1995, the Regatta Group acquired the company. In 2008, Craghoppers formed a partnership with survival expert Bear Grylls, producing a range of extreme condition clothing for his use.

== Ranges ==
Craghoppers produce two ranges a year – spring/summer (available to consumers from February) and autumn/winter (available to consumers from September). Each range features products specifically for that season such as insulated jackets for winter and shorts, tees, and sandals in summer. The range includes clothing and accessories for men, women, and children as well as footwear, rucksacks, and luggage.

== Clothing ==
=== Technologies ===
They have designed and promoted the following technologies:

- NosiLife – Clothing with a non-toxic anti insect finish that lasts the lifetime of the garment.
- Breathable fabrics.
- Stretch fabric.
- SolarShield fabrics which give UV protection, it is currently rated as having an up to 40+ UPF (Ultraviolet protection factor) index and block 97.5+% of UVR (Ultraviolet radiation.)
- Wash & Wear fabrics – used for travel clothing where clothes dry overnight and need no or minimal ironing.
- AquaDry & AquaDry Stretch – Clothing which incorporates waterproof and breathable fabrics, also available in stretch fabrics.
- Lightweight clothing.

Craghoppers are one of several companies that meet Gore-Tex standards and are authorised to use and sell with Gore-Tex waterproof technologies. Many items of Craghoppers clothing have a hidden zippable security pocket.

They also produce luggage, softshell jackets, synthetic insulated jackets, and accessories such as caps and scarves. Their Kiwi walking trousers, with over 10 million pairs sold, are popular with ramblers.

== Conservation projects ==
In 2013, Craghoppers joined the European Outdoor Conservation Association. In February 2015, the firm introduced a fleece made from recycled plastic bottles.

== Partners ==
Craghoppers has partnered with English Heritage, sponsoring its Stonehenge Cycle Challenge and Hadrian's Wall Hike. English Heritage cares for places of historic significance in England such as Roman forts and medieval castles.

Craghoppers partnered with the Dian Fossey Gorilla Fund International, a charity that protects gorillas and their habitats in Africa. Craghoppers has been supplying kits to the Dian Fossey team who work in the Virunga rainforest in Rwanda. Dian Fossey T-shirts were also sold to raise awareness and money for the charity.
