= Bergans =

Norwegian outdoor equipment company

Bergans of Norway
- Industry: Outdoor equipment and apparel
- Founded: 1908; 118 years ago
- Founder: Ole F. Bergan
- Headquarters: Asker, Norway
- Key people: Silje Garberg Ree (CEO)
- Products: Backpacks\canoes\gear for hiking and trekking
- Number of employees: 32 (2026)
- Parent: Sport Holding AS
- Website: bergans.com

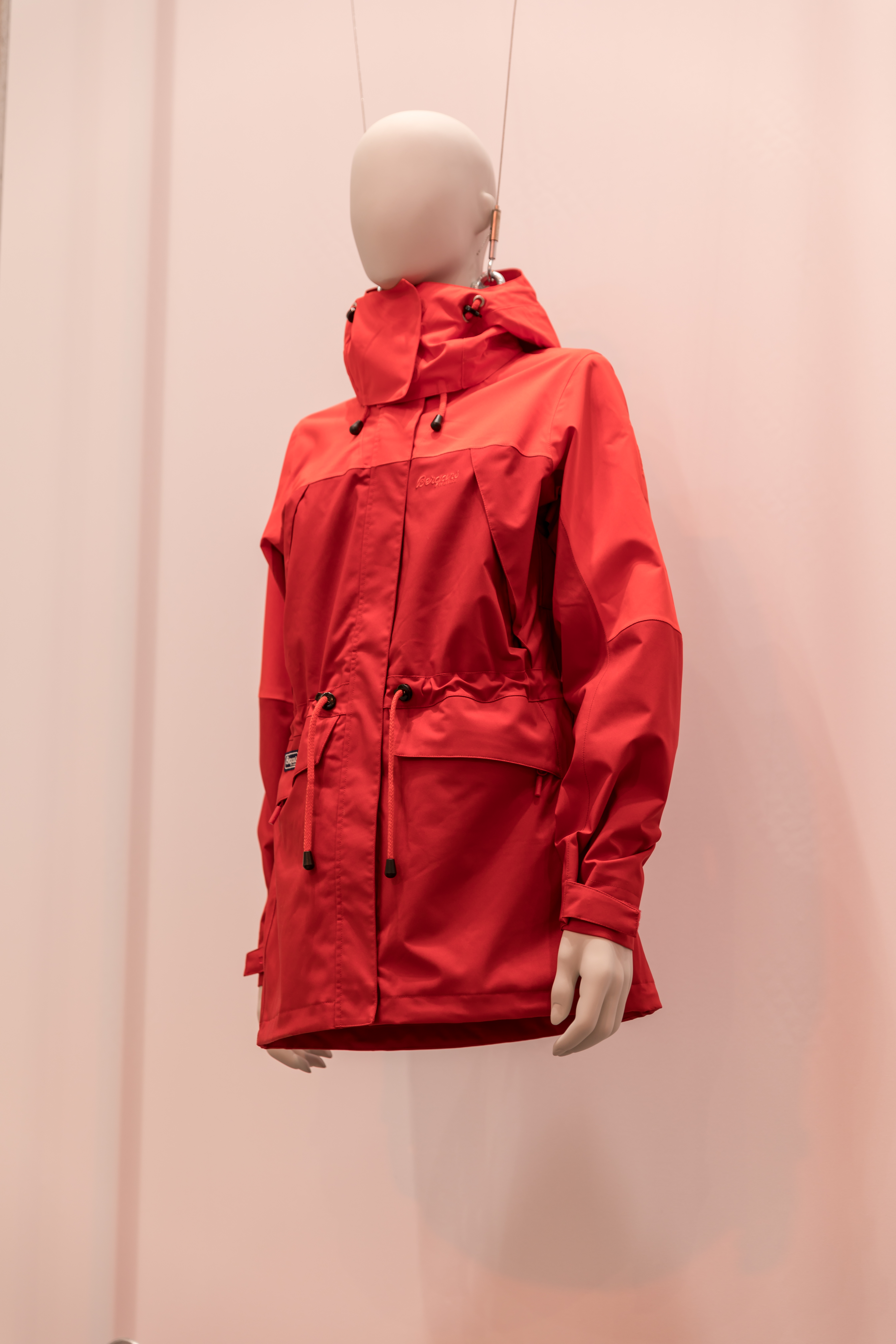
Bergans jacket, 2018

Bergans of Norway (formally Bergans Fritid AS) is a Norwegian outdoor equipment and technical apparel manufacturer headquartered in Asker, Norway. Founded in 1908 by Ole F. Bergan, the company pioneered the external-frame backpack, which became widely adopted by explorers and military forces in the early 20th century.

Today, Bergans develops and manufactures backpacks, tents, sleeping bags, canoes, hiking equipment and, technical clothing.

== History ==
Bergans was founded by Ole Ferdinand Bergan (1876–1956), a bike mechanic in Tønsberg. In 1908, Bergan invented a backpack with an external frame in 1908. During his lifetime, Bergan registered 45 patents.

In August 2021, Bergans was purchased by Sport Holding, Norway's largest sports retailer.

The Norwegian Armed Forces have been using backpacks from Bergans since 1913.
