= Fair Wear Foundation =

Garment industry activist organization

- Founded: 1999
- Type: Non-profit organization
- Purpose: To improve conditions in garment factories
- Location: Amsterdam, Netherlands
- Key people: Alexander Kohnstamm, Executive Director
- Website: fairwear.org

Fair Wear Foundation (Fair Wear) is a Dutch non-profit organisation that works with garment brands, garment workers and industry influencers to improve labour conditions in garment factories.

== History ==
Fair Wear was founded in 1999. By then, garment production in the Netherlands had been displaced to low-wage countries. After some years of campaigning against poor labour conditions in low-wage countries, the union FNV and the CCC contacted the employers' organisations and proposed a joint initiative to improve labour conditions in the garment sector. In the period of 1999–2002, Fair Wear carried out pilot projects on the implementation of the Code of Labour Practices with four Dutch companies. The first group of 11 members was announced to the public in March 2003.

== Operations ==
Fair Wear is active in 11 production countries: Bangladesh, Bulgaria, China, India, Indonesia, Myanmar, Macedonia, Romania, Tunisia, Turkey and Vietnam.

The Fair Wear Code of Labour Practices contains eight labour standards that are based on the conventions of the International Labour Organization (ILO) and the Universal Declaration on Human Rights.

Fair Wear's eight labour standards are:

- Employment is freely chosen
- There is no discrimination in employment
- No exploitation of child labour
- Freedom of association and the right to collective bargaining
- Payment of a living wage
- No excessive working hours
- Safe and healthy working conditions
- Legally binding employment relationship

Fair Wear engages in performance checks, audits, and workplace education programmes, and it operates complaint helplines. Fair Wear does not certify products, brands, or factories.

== See also ==
- International Labour Organization
- Labour law
- Labor rights
- Sweatshop
