= Devold =

Devold is a Norwegian surname. Notable people with the surname include:

- Finn Devold (1902–1977), Norwegian marine biologist
- Hallvard Devold (1898–1957), Norwegian Arctic explorer
- Kristin Krohn Devold (born 1961), Norwegian politician
- Kristin K. Devold (born 1939), Norwegian politician

== See also ==
- Devold Peak, mountain of Queen Maud Land, Antarctica
