= Haglöfs =

Company

Haglöfs AB
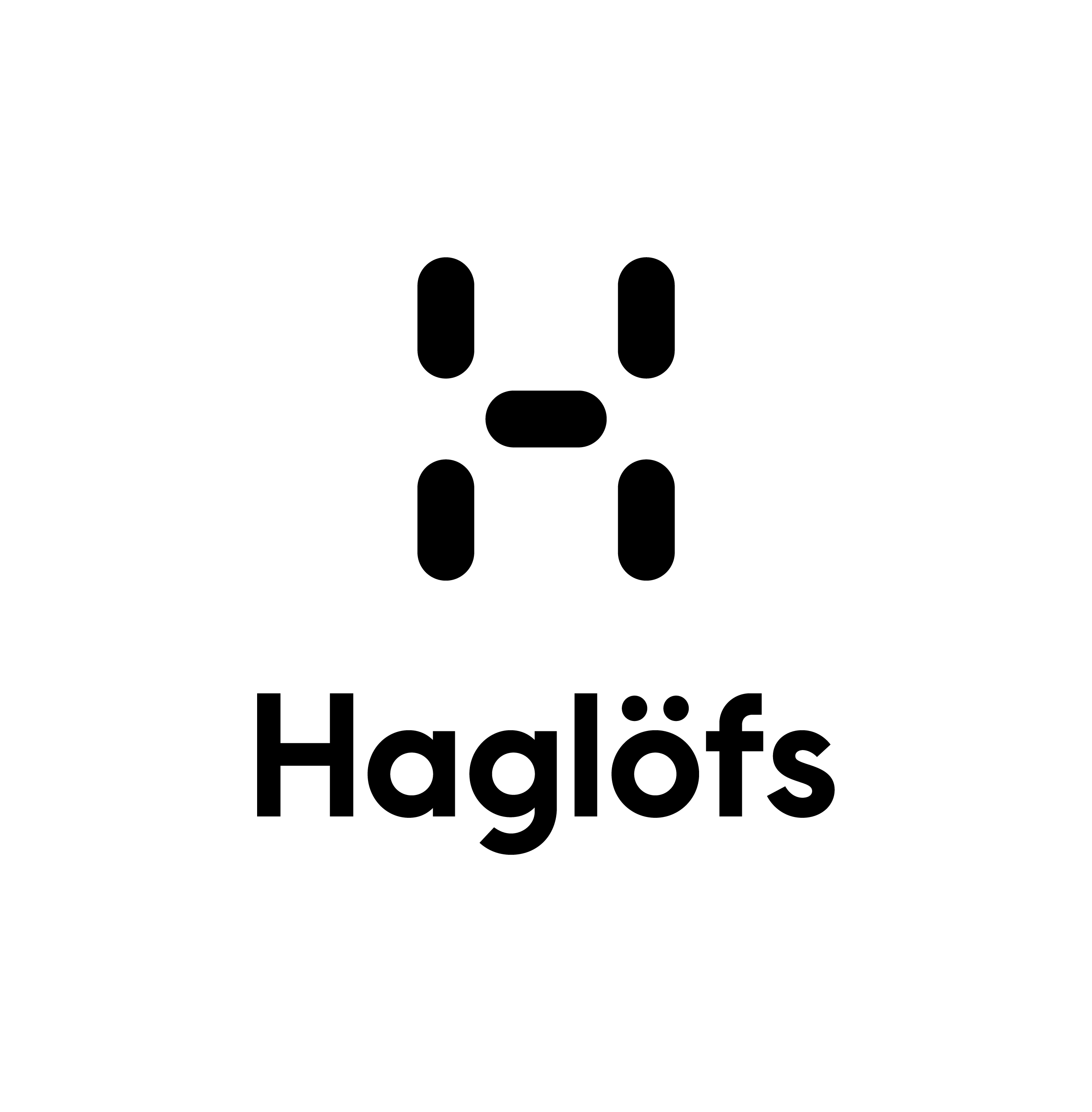
- Industry: Outdoor clothing & equipment
- Founded: Dalarna, 1914
- Founder: Wiktor Haglöf
- Headquarters: Stockholm, Sweden
- Key people: CEO: Fredrik Ohlsson
- Products: Outdoor clothing, footwear, backpacks, sleeping bags
- Owner: LionRock Capital
- Website: www.haglofs.com

Haglöfs AB is an outdoor equipment brand founded in 1914 in Sweden by Wiktor Haglöf.

== Business ==
Haglöfs is sold in 28 markets via: Wholesale (direct accounts as well as through distributors), has e-commerce in 13 countries, and runs 12 own stores.

Haglöfs operates through subsidiaries in Sweden, Norway, Finland, Denmark, Germany, UK, and has its own operations in France.

Haglöfs designs, develops and markets clothing, shoes and hardware for outdoor use from its head office in Alvik, Stockholm, Sweden. Haglöfs does not own any factories, but collaborates with a network of over 90 material suppliers and manufacturers of clothing, footwear and hardware across 17 countries. The majority of Haglöfs' products are sent to their warehouse in Eskilstuna, Sweden, from where they are distributed to various sales channels.

On 12 July 2010, Haglöfs became a wholly owned subsidiary of the Japanese sportswear brand Asics, which bought Haglöfs for ¥11.4 billion ($128.7 million)

In 2022, the company sold products for SEK 976 million and had 238 employees worldwide, of which 190 were in Sweden.

On 18 December 2023, LionRock Capital Limited acquired a 100% interest in Haglöfs from Asics.
