= Hanwag =

German shoe company

- Company type: GmbH
- Website: www.hanwag.de

Hanwag GmbH is a German manufacturer of mountaineering boots and hiking boots headquartered in Vierkirchen. Hanwag GmbH is part of Fenix Outdoor concern.

== History ==
Hanwag was founded in 1921 by Hans Wagner in the Bavarian town of Vierkirchen.

In 1936, Hans Wagner supplied the first ski boots for the Winter Olympics in Garmisch-Partenkirchen, at that time still made of leather. During the war, the factory was looted, but production was soon able to restart, first under the Hawa brand, then eventually as Hanwag (Hans Wagner).

In 2004, the company was sold to Sweden’s Fenix Group.
