= List of outdoor industry parent companies =

The following list is of outdoor brands that are owned by another entity. The brands listed are those specific to the outdoor sporting goods industry. Parent companies may own other brands that are not listed because those other brands are not marketed as outdoor sporting goods. Companies and brands that are not subsidiaries of another company are not listed here.

== Adidas Group (Germany) ==
- Five Ten
- Runtastic

== Authentic Brands Group (USA) ==
- Reebok

== Amer Sports (Finland) ==
- Arc'teryx
- Armada
- Atomic
- DeMarini
- Louisville Slugger
- Peak Performance
- Precor USA
- Salomon
- Sports Tracker
- Suunto
- Wilson Sporting Goods

== ASICS (Japan) ==
- Haglöfs

== Calida Group through Lafuma Group (France) ==
- Eider
- Killy
- Lafuma
- Le Chameau
- Millet
- Ober
- Oxbow

== Callaway Golf Company (USA) ==
- Jack Wolfskin

== Canadian Tire (Canada) ==
- Woods

== Cascade Designs (USA) ==
- Mountain Safety Research (MSR)
- Platypus
- SealLine
- Therm-a-Rest
- PackTowl
- Varilite

== Clarus Corp (USA) ==
- Black Diamond Equipment
- Sierra Bullets
- Pieps
- Skin Nourishment

== Columbia Sportswear (USA) ==
- Columbia Sportswear
- Columbia Montrail
- Mountain Hardwear
- prAna
- Sorel
- OutDry
- Pacific Trail
- Baffin

== Confluence Outdoor (USA) ==
- Adventure Technology
- Dagger Kayaks
- Harmony Gear
- Mad River Canoe
- Perception Kayaks
- Wave Sport Kayaks
- Wilderness Systems

== Deckers Outdoor Corporation (USA) ==
- UGG
- Teva
- Hoka One One
- Sanuk
- Koolaburra

== Equip Outdoor Technologies (UK) ==
- Lowe Alpine
- Rab

== Exxel Outdoors ==
- Kelty
- Master Sportsman
- Sierra Designs
- Slumberjack
- Ultimate Direction
- Tadpool
- Wenzel
- x2o

== Fenix Outdoor AB (Sweden) ==
- Fjällräven
- Royal Robbins Inc
- Friluftsland AS
- Hanwag
- Naturkompaniet
- Partioaitta
- Tierra

== Fiskars (Finland) ==
- Gerber Legendary Blades

== Gear Aid Inc. (Previously McNett) (USA) ==
- Aquamira
- M Essentials
- McNett Tactical
- Outgo

== Helen of Troy Limited (USA) ==
- Hydroflask
- Osprey Packs

== Johnson Outdoors (USA) ==
- Cannon
- Carlisle paddles
- Eureka! Tent Company
- Extrasport personal
- Geonav
- Humminbird
- Jetboil
- Lakemaster (Waypoint Technologies)
- Minn Kota
- Necky kayaks
- Ocean Kayak
- Old Town
- Scubapro
- Silva (brand name within USA and Canada, as separate from Silva Sweden AB)
- Tech40

== Katadyn (Switzerland) ==
- Optimus International AB

== Kellwood Company ==
- Sierra Designs

== Moncler (Italy) ==
- Moncler
- Stone Island

== Newell Brands through Jarden (USA) ==
- 5150
- Coleman Company, Inc.
- Dana Design (now defunct)
- Earth shoes
- ExOfficio
- Hawk Shoes
- Liquid
- Marmot

== OSSO Outdoor (Spain) ==
- 5dedos
- OS2O

== Regent, L.P. (USA) ==
- Mavic

== Schwan-Stabilo (Germany) ==
- Deuter Sport
- Ortovox
- Maier Sports
- Gonso

== Telemos Capital through Mammut Sports Group (Switzerland) ==
- Ajungilak
- Raichle
- Toko

== Terra Nova Equipment (UK) ==
- Extremities

== VAUDE (Germany) ==
- Edelrid
- Lucky
- Markill
- Red Chili

== VF Corporation (USA) ==
- Eagle Creek
- Supreme
- Eastpak
- JanSport
- Kipling
- Napapijri
- The North Face
- SmartWool
- The Timberland Company
- Vans
- Icebreaker
- Altra Running

== Vista Outdoor (USA) ==
- Beestinger
- Bell Sports
- Blackburn
- Blackhawk
- Bollé
- Bushnell
- Butler Creek
- CamelBak
- Camp Chef
- Champion
- Federal
- Giro
- Hoppe's
- Jimmy Styks
- Primos
- Serengeti
- Tasco
- Venor
- Hevi-Shot
- Remington Ammunition
- QuietKat

== Wolverine Worldwide (USA) ==
- Chaco
- Cushe
- Merrell
- Saucony
- Sperry Top-Sider
- Wolverine

== See also ==
- List of mountaineering equipment brands
