= Patrik Frisk =

American businessman in the apparel industry

- Born: 1962 or 1963 (age 62–63); Sweden
- Occupation: Businessman
- Title: Former CEO, Under Armour
- Term: January 2020-May 2022
- Predecessor: Kevin Plank
- Board member of: Under Armour

Patrik Frisk (born 1962/1963) is a Swedish/American businessman in the apparel industry. From 2020 to 2022, he was the president and CEO of Under Armour, when he succeeded the company's founder, Kevin Plank. He was previously president and chief operating officer of the company since 2017. Frisk has worked for 30 years in retail and has had senior positions at The North Face and Timberland, before joining the ALDO Group in 2014 as CEO.

== Early life ==
Frisk was born in Sweden.

== Career ==
=== Early career ===
Early in his career, Frisk was involved in several enterprises in Gällstad, Sweden, including the Swedish apparel company Ivanhoe. He helped launch Lager 157, a Swedish chain of specialty retail clothing stores, in the early 2000s. He subsequently held senior positions at the Swedish outdoor-apparel maker Peak Performance and at W. L. Gore and Associates, the maker of Gore-Tex fabrics. Later Frisk joined the American apparel and footwear company VF Corporation.

Afterwards as president of The Timberland Company, he was "credited with revitalizing the Timberland brand" during his three-year tenure at the company. In April 2014, Frisk was promoted to coalition president for Outdoor Americas, with responsibility for The North Face, Timberland, JanSport, Lucy Activewear, and Smartwool brands.

=== Aldo Group ===
In 2014, Frisk became CEO of the footwear company and retailer Aldo Group. Frisk restructured the company, including streamlining its North American operations while expanding overseas, reassessing styles and brands, increasing sales to other chains, establishing new systems and products, increasing research on customers, digitizing the company, and implementing Salesforce.com products to understand and communicate with customers. Frisk's role was also to prepare the company for the founder's son, David Bensadoun, to take over. Frisk left at the end of March 2017 to make way for Bensadoun as CEO.

=== Under Armour ===
In 2017, Under Armour CEO Kevin Plank asked him to become president and chief operating officer; in doing so Plank relinquished his own status as president and also re-filled the COO position, which had not existed since 2015. Frisk assumed the offices effective 2017, with responsibility for go-to-market strategy and execution of its long-term growth plan. The company reorganized so that the heads of revenue, product, marketing, supply chain, and strategy reported to Frisk, who in turn reported to Plank.

Frisk was brought in after Under Armour's two decades of North American growth dipped in 2017, particularly from competition via Nike and Adidas and from changing consumer buying patterns. He launched a multi-year restructuring plan to cut costs, reduce inventory levels, tighten operations, and stabilize business. He began refocusing the company on being a "performance" brand. In 2018, his total compensation at Under Armour was $6,285,000.

In October 2019, Plank announced that Frisk would become Under Armour's CEO in January 2020, while Plank would become executive chairman and brand chief. In addition to being Under Armour's president and CEO, Frisk joined the company's board of directors. He continues to report to Plank.

In May 2022, Under Armour announced that Frisk would be stepping down as CEO at the beginning of June and would stay on as an advisor until September 2022.
