= 2020 Facebook ad boycotts =

Group of boycotts in July 2020

The 2020 Facebook ad boycotts were a group of boycotts that took place during the month of July 2020. Much of the boycotts were organized under the Stop Hate for Profit campaign, launched by the advocacy groups the Anti-Defamation League, the NAACP, Color of Change, Common Sense Media, Free Press and Sleeping Giants. Over 1,000 companies participated in the boycott.

== History ==
In June 2020, Facebook refused to censor a post that contained Donald Trump's "When the looting starts, the shooting starts" statement, as well as a post by Trump that criticized the CHAZ. Mark Zuckerberg later defended this move. This led to immense criticism and later became one of the factors leading to the boycott.

According to Jonathan Greenblatt, one of the organizers behind the boycott, the idea for the boycott arose because his organization thought that Facebook was not doing enough to censor hate speech. He requested a meeting with Facebook representatives but was turned down. After communicating with Rashad Robinson and Derrick Johnson, the three of them launched the campaign.

On June 17, the Anti-Defamation League, the NAACP, Color of Change, Common Sense Media, Free Press and Sleeping Giants revealed the Stop Hate for Profit campaign through a full-page ad in the Los Angeles Times. The coalition of organizations grew to include the League of United Latin American Citizens, Mozilla and the National Hispanic Media Coalition. The Stop Hate for Profit campaign called for an ad pause in June 2020, asking companies to pause spending on Facebook and Instagram ads for July 2020.

On June 19, The North Face and REI announced their plans to join the boycott. Shortly thereafter, Upwork and Patagonia announced that they would join the boycott.

On June 24, Ben & Jerry's announced that it would join the boycott. The next day, Verizon announced that it would join the boycott.

On June 26, Unilever announced that it would join the boycott. The next day, one of the organizers of the boycott announced that the boycott would now aim to include European companies. In addition, Coca-Cola announced that it would join the boycott.

On July 7, the organizers of the boycott met with Facebook representatives as well as Zuckerberg. The organizers disliked the meeting, and brought up how Facebook did not set any dates or make detailed plans.

== Participants ==
The following is a non-exhaustive list of participants:

- Adidas
- Arc′teryx
- Aviva
- Bank of Montreal
- Beam Suntory
- Chipotle
- Chobani
- CIBC
- Clorox
- Coca-Cola
- CVS Health
- Diageo
- Dunkin' Donuts
- Ford
- Goodby, Silverstein & Partners
- Hershey's
- HP
- InterContinental Hotels Group
- Lego
- Levi's
- Lululemon Athletica
- MEC
- Patagonia
- Pfizer
- Puma
- RBC
- REI
- Scotiabank
- Sony Interactive Entertainment
- Starbucks
- Stuff
- Target
- Toronto-Dominion Bank
- Unilever, including Ben & Jerry's
- Upwork
- Verizon
- VF (JanSport, The North Face, Vans)
- Volkswagen

== Criticism ==
Writing for The Verge, Casey Newton argued that the companies that took part in the boycott acted "as if Facebook doesn't ban hate speech at all", and that the boycott should've focused on the company's monopoly power.

Several writers noted that many businesses had already cut their marketing budgets due to the COVID-19 pandemic. Most of Facebook's revenue comes from small to mid-sized companies, and the top 100 advertisers only comprise 6% of the total revenue, suggesting that a boycott would be futile. The long-term impact of the boycott was expected to be minimal, as an industry analyst predicted that advertisers would ramp up spending during the period.

== Impact ==
On June 26, the share price of Facebook dropped by 8.3%. On the same day, Mark Zuckerberg stated that the company would begin to place "warning labels" on posts such as those by Trump. In addition, the company would prohibit certain types of ads and misinformation related to voting. This was criticized by the organizers of the boycott.

On June 30, Facebook removed several groups and users associated with the Boogaloo movement.

In August 2020, Facebook and Instagram began removing 1,500 QAnon pages and groups that discussed violence, and in early October reportedly committed to removing all QAnon content, even if it does not explicitly refer to violence. On October 12, CNN and other news outlets cited recent increased pressure, including from the #StopHateForProfit boycott and campaign's nonprofit organizers, such as Color of Change, the Anti-Defamation League, and NAACP in Zuckerberg's decision to expand Facebook's "hate speech policy to include content that 'denies or distorts the Holocaust', a major shift for the platform, which has repeatedly come under fire for its inaction on hateful and false information."
