= Edison Awards =

American innovation awards

- Awarded for: Honoring excellence in new product and service development, marketing, human-centered design and innovation
- Country: United States
- First award: 1987
- Website: www.edisonawards.com

Edison Awards is an American company that runs an annual competition honoring excellence in innovation in a broad range of categories.

== Company ==
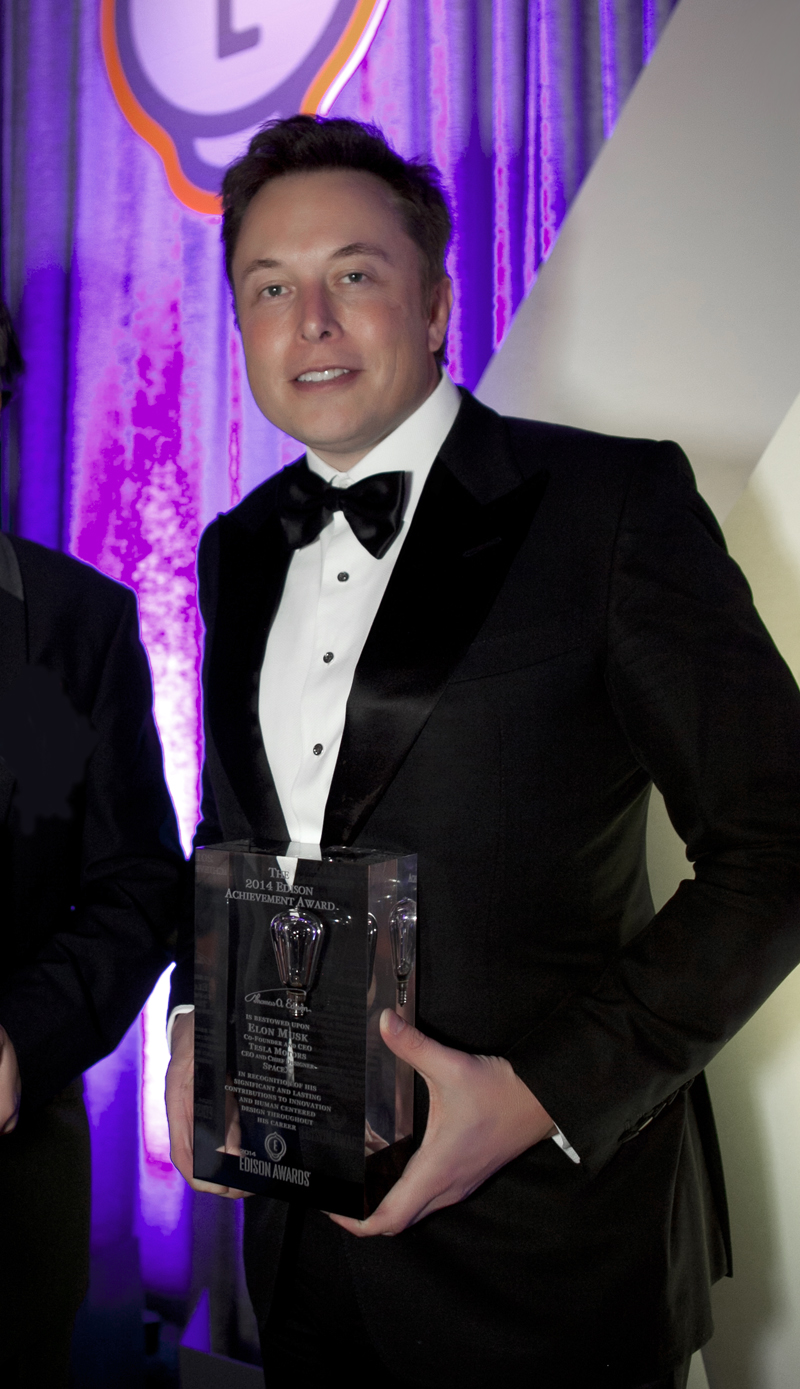
Elon Musk at the 2014 Edison Awards

The Edison Awards were established by the American Marketing Association in 1987, and has been an independent enterprise since 2008.

== Awards ==
The Edison Awards are named after the inventor Thomas Edison. They honor innovations in product and service development, marketing and human-centered design. Categories range from green technology to medical breakthroughs. Entrants must meet strict innovation criteria and competencies as defined in the book Innovate Like Edison: The Success System of America's Greatest Inventor (Gelb & Caldicott 2007).

The Edison Awards Steering Committee reviews nominations; the finalists are then voted on by a large panel drawn from business professionals, scientists and academia. Entries are judged based on societal impact, creativity and marketplace success. In 2013, there were 14 categories and 38 sub-categories, with 131 award recipients.

== Recipients ==
Past recipients of the Edison Achievement Award include:

- 1991 – Herb Baum – Campbell Soup Co.
- 1991 – Frank Perdue – Perdue Farms
- 1992 – William McGowan – MCI Corporation
- 1993 – J. Willard Marriott Jr. – Marriott International
- 1993 – Jay Van Andel – Amway Corporation
- 1993 – Raymond W. Smith – Bell Atlantic
- 1993 – Rich DeVos – Amway Corporation
- 1994 – Bert C. Roberts – MCI Corporation
- 1994 – H. John Greeniaus – Nabisco, Inc.
- 1995 – Arthur Martinez – Sears, Roebuck & Co.
- 1995 – Robert Palmer – Digital Corporation
- 1996 – Douglas Ivester – Coca-Cola Company
- 1996 – Nolan D. Archibald – Black & Decker
- 1997 – Reuben Mark – Colgate-Palmolive
- 1997 – Martha Stewart – MSL Omnimedia
- 1999 – Dale Morrison – Campbell Soup Co.
- 1999 – Ted Turner – Time Warner
- 2009 – David M. Kelley – IDEO
- 2009 – Susan Desmond-Hellmann – Genentech
- 2010 – A.G. Lafley – Procter & Gamble
- 2010 – Susan Hockfield – MIT
- 2011 – Alan Mulally – Ford Motor Company
- 2011 – John S. Hendricks – Discovery Communications
- 2012 – Chris Anderson – TED
- 2012 – Steve Jobs – Apple, Inc.
- 2013 – Paul E. Jacobs – Qualcomm
- 2014 – Elon Musk – Tesla, SpaceX
- 2014 – Yang Yuanqing – Lenovo
- 2015 – Clayton M. Christensen – Harvard Business School
- 2015 – Robert A. Lutz – General Motors Company
- 2016 – John Chambers – Cisco Systems, Inc.
- 2017 – Astro Teller – GoogleX
- 2017 – Jeff Immelt – General Electric
- 2018 – Marillyn Hewson – Lockheed Martin
- 2019 – Ginni Rometty – IBM
- 2021 – Jennifer Holmgren, Reinhold Schmieding – Arthrex
- 2022 – Carmichael Roberts – Material Impact / Breakthrough Energy Ventures
- 2022 – Bracken Darrell – Logitech
- 2023 – Sir Jonathan Ive – LoveFrom
- 2023 – Patrick Gelsinger – Intel
- 2024 – Laurie Leshin – Jet Propulsion Laboratory, NASA
- 2024 – Gwynne Shotwell – SpaceX
- 2025 – Michael M. Crow – Arizona State University
- 2025 – Jensen Huang – Nvidia
- 2026 – Rihanna & Adam Silver
