= Bulwark Protection =

American apparel company

- Industry: Personal protective equipment
- Founded: 1971; 55 years ago
- Parent: Workwear Outfitters, LLC
- Website: www.bulwark.com

Bulwark Protection is an American company that manufactures and distributes flame-resistant protective apparel to the North American industrial market, primarily serving the electric, utility and petrochemical segments. The company is headquartered in Nashville, Tennessee and currently owned by Workwear Outfitters. It was previously owned by VF Corporation (NYSE: VFC), the world's largest apparel company, until 2021. It was ranked among the top industrial protective clothing industry players in 2017.

== History ==
Bulwark was started in the fall of 1990 in Edmonton, Alberta, Canada by Dan Starko. The company's original name was Protective Apparel, but it was quickly deemed too generic and a local ad agency was hired to develop a new name; Bulwark – "to fortify and protect" – was chosen. Dan was joined by his brothers Dave and Tom shortly after the start up and funding was raised through Vencap Equities to fund a very aggressive business plan.

In 1993, Bulwark became the first apparel manufacturing company in the world to have achieved ISO 9000 status. Bulwark grew to annual sales of almost 50 million with a staff of 400 employees.

In 1996, the company was acquired by Red Kap, a manufacturer and distributor of work-related clothing. Red Kap had paved the way for flame-resistant garments in the industrial laundry market in 1971 and continued to evolve in the market for the next 25 years. The acquisition of Bulwark enabled this division of VF Corporation, to become the largest manufacturer and distributor of protective clothing in the world.

In 2021, Bulwark was sold to Redwood Capital Investments, LLC, and later became part of a standalone company known as Workwear Outfitters.
