= Altra =

Altra may refer to:

== Places ==
- Altra College, a school in Amsterdam, Netherlands
- Altra, Nordland, an island in Alstahaug municipality in Nordland county, Norway

== Businesses ==
- Altra Industrial Motion, a power transmission products manufacturer
- Altra Running, an athletic footwear company

== Other ==
- Nissan Altra, a model of car
- L'Altra, an American band formed in 1999
- L'Altra (film), a 1947 Italian film
- Altra Running, an athletic shoe company
