= Christopher Raeburn =

Christopher Raeburn may refer to:

- Christopher Raeburn (producer)
- Christopher Raeburn (designer)
