= Napapijri =

Italian clothing brand

- Type: Subsidiary
- Industry: Fashion
- Founded: 1987; 39 years ago
- Founder: Giuliana Rosset
- Headquarters: Stabio, Switzerland
- Number of locations: 28 (April 2022)
- Area served: EMEA
- Key people: Silvia Onofri (president); Christopher Raeburn (Creative Director)
- Products: Apparel, accessories, footwear, outerwear, travel bags
- Parent: VF Corporation (2004–present)
- Website: www.napapijri.com

Napapijri is an Italian fashion house and label founded in 1987 in Aosta, Italy, widely known as a maker of travel bags, using waxed cotton canvas borrowed from military field tents. Since its acquisition in 2004, it has become a subsidiary of the U.S.-based VF Corporation.

The name Napapijri derives from "napapiiri", the Finnish word for Arctic Circle.

== History ==
Napapijri was established in 1987 by Giuliana Rosset, an Italian entrepreneur from the Aosta Valley region. After acquiring Green Sport Monte Bianco S.p.A - a small backpack company - from a Turin artisan, Rosset relocated the headquarters to Quart, where production began with approximately fifteen employees. The Bering Bag, a waxed canvas duffel bag catering to travelers, marked the debut of the Napapijri brand.

In 1990, Napapijri expanded into outerwear with the introduction of the Skidoo Jacket, a lightweight, rain-proof anorak designed for extreme temperatures. In 1995, the launch of the Rainforest Jacket moved Napapijri into urban fashion, establishing the brand in the streetwear world. Throughout the 2000s, the brand diversified its offerings, introducing the Napapijri Kids clothing line in 2002, Napapijri footwear in 2007, and opening its first store in Chamonix, France, in 1997.

The U.S.-based clothing manufacturer VF Corporation acquired Napapijri in 2004.

In 2006, Napapijri opened its first store in the USA, in SoHo in New York City. In 2023, Silvia Onofri became its President, and British designer Christopher Raeburn its creative director.

== Description ==
Napapijri specializes in producing outerwear with urban appeal (ex: anorak jacket). Its designs feature flap pockets, diagonal neck cuts, and bold colors. The product range includes coats and jackets to fleece and sweatshirts, t-shirts, trousers, bags and accessories, and shoes.

Napapijri collaborated with Karl Lagerfeld (2002), Yoshinori Ono (2010), Martine Rose, Patta, Obey (2024), Fiorucci, and Luisa Via Roma.

== Commitments ==
In 2008, Napapijri partnered with photographer/adventurer Sebastian Copeland for the exhibition “Antarctica: The Global Warming” at the Milan store.

In 2015/16, Napapijri replaced animal fur in its products by eco-fur made of synthetic fibers. In 2019 and 2021, the brand introduced a line of circular-based products. Its infinity anorak achieved the gold level Cradle to Cradle certification.

In 2023, the brand worked with marine advocates and conservation filmmakers Alexandra Johnston and Harriet Murphy to create the documentary “Orcas in the Arctic” about the critical role of orcas in the Arctic ecosystem.
