= The South Butt =

American parody clothing company

The South Butt, LLC
- Company type: Private
- Industry: Retail; Wholesale
- Founded: May 2007; 19 years ago
- Founder: James A. Winkelmann
- Defunct: June 2011
- Fate: Terminated/Canceled
- Headquarters: St. Louis, United States
- Area served: United States
- Products: Clothing; Outdoor gear
- Owner: James A. Winkelmann

The South Butt, LLC was an American clothing and accessories company founded in May 2007 by Jimmy Winkelmann Sr. and Jr., the latter of whom was at the time a 16-year-old student at Chaminade College Preparatory School in St. Louis, Missouri. The South Butt dissolved in June 2011.

Winkelmann Jr. claimed the company was a parody of The North Face, an American outdoor product company. In August 2008, The North Face sent a cease and desist letter to Winkelmann threatening to sue him if he did not "cease all promotion and sales of South Butt products and abandon his trademark registration application." According to The North Face, his "use of the South Butt & design mark and the Never Stop Relaxing tagline [was] not defensible as a parody[.]" The North Face sought an amicable resolution of the matter, voluntary abandonment of the pending trademark application, and immediate discontinuance of the company's name, mark, and tagline. In response, Winkelmann offered to sell his company to The North Face for $1 million, an offer that he later rescinded as The South Butt grew.

In December 2008, The North Face filed a lawsuit in the United States District Court for the Eastern District of Missouri against Winkelmann, The South Butt, and Williams Pharmacy, a company which handled the products' marketing and manufacturing details. The court ordered mediation in the case, and on April 1, 2010, the parties reached a closed settlement agreement. Two days later, Winkelmann Sr. formed a company called "Why Climb Mountains" which sold "The Butt Face" products. In October 2012, the Winkelmanns admitted in court that they violated the settlement agreement with The North Face. In addition, the court ordered them to abandon a trademark registration application for The Butt Face, shut down their web store and Facebook page, surrender all merchandise, and pay $65,000, an amount that would be reduced by $1,000 for every month of compliance.
