= Cascade Designs =

American outdoor recreation products company

Coordinates: 47.567847°N 122.333677°W

Cascade Designs, Inc.
- Founded: 1972
- Headquarters: Seattle, Washington, US
- Website: www.cascadedesigns.com

Cascade Designs is an American company specializing in outdoor recreation products. It is located in Seattle, Washington, and Reno, Nevada, and was founded in 1972 by two former Boeing engineers, who were avid backpackers. Their first product innovation was the self-inflating camping mattress, marketed as Therm-a-Rest. In 2015, Cascade Designs moved 1/5 of its workforce to Reno to take advantage of lower wages.

Cascade Designs owns the following subsidiaries and/or trademarks:

- Mountain Safety Research, acquired in August 2001, makers of outdoor recreation gear started by Larry Penberthy.
- Therm-a-Rest, makers of portable sleeping pads
- Platypus, makers of hydration systems
- SealLine, makers of waterproof bags
- Tracks, makers of high-end walking staffs and trekking poles
- Varilite, specializing in wheelchair positioning products
- PackTowl, specializing in highly packable technical towels

== See also ==
- List of outdoor industry parent companies
