= Christopher Raeburn (designer) =

British fashion designer (born 1982)

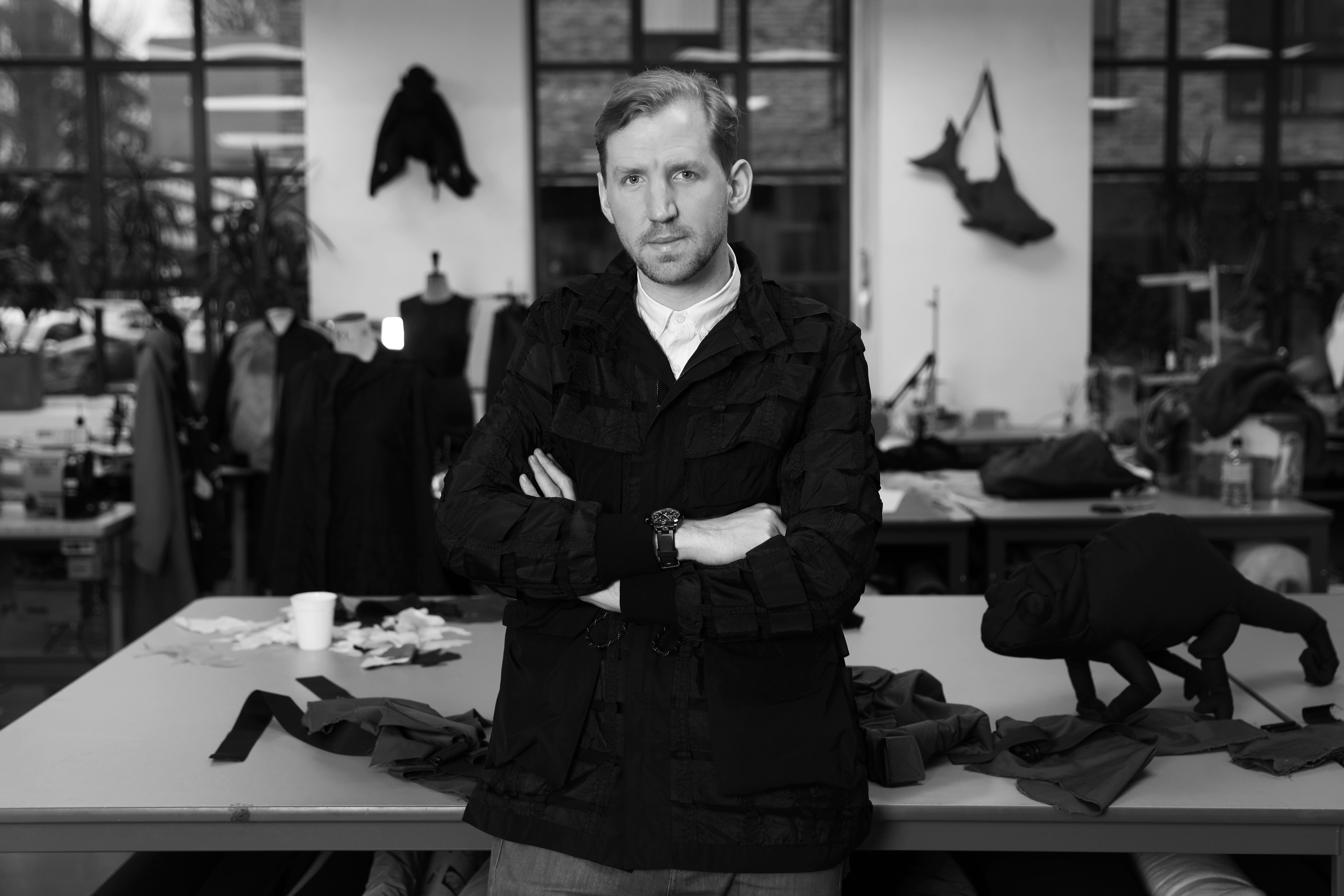
- Raeburn in his East London studio
- Born: 13 August 1982 (age 44); Kent, England
- Education: Royal College of Art
- Occupation: Fashion designer
- Label: RÆBURN
- Website: www.raeburndesign.co.uk

Christopher Raeburn (born 13 August 1982), is a British fashion designer who reworks surplus fabrics and garments to create menswear, womenswear and accessories.

== Early life ==
Christopher Raeburn was born as the youngest of three boys in Kent.

== Career ==
Raeburn graduated from London's Royal College of Art in 2006. He freelanced as a pattern cutter before setting up his own studio in 2008, and later his label.

In 2008, he participated in the 'Camouflage' exhibition at London's Imperial War Museum, and showcased his first collection (reversible garments titled Inverted) during the London Design Week. In 2009, he showcased menswear in Paris and gained support from Esthetica, allowing him to show his work at London Fashion Week that September. In 2010, Raeburn was the first designer to be awarded Topshop Newgen sponsorship for both men's and women's wear in the same season.

In 2010, Raeburn was approached by Victorinox to collaborate with them on a men's and women's wear capsule collection. Victorinox set up a "Remade in Switzerland" studio in Ibach, the birthplace of Karl Elsener, the founder of Victorinox. He found the original house where Elsener founded the brand as inspiration for the establishment of his Swiss LAB. In his lab, he produced 100 pieces of each style by hand. The collaboration launched on schedule during New York Fashion Week in February 2011.

In 2011, he was nominated for the 'Observer Ethical Awards: Fashion Category' and 'Condé Nast Traveller award: design and innovation' prizes, and his 'REMADE IN SWITZERLAND' collaboration with Victorinox was at NYFW.

In 2012, Raeburn opened more than 20 stores across several countries, including the Paris-based boutique Colette. In the same year Raeburn launched his first accessories collection, as well as his first collaboration with Moncler.

In 2013 Raeburn won Designer Business of the Year at the UK Fashion and Textiles awards and launched collaborations, with Rapha and Fred Perry. He ended the year by being announced as artistic director of Victorinox Fashion.

In 2014, there were two Woolmark sponsorships for Raeburn, this time towards his AW14 and his SS15 seasons, menswear and womenswear. The designer was shortlisted for BFC/GQ Designer Menswear Fund, and also launched his Barbour collaboration. In the same year, Raeburn was awarded Menswear Brand of the Year at the UK Fashion and Textiles Awards.

In 2015, Raeburn was shortlisted for the second year for BFC/GQ Designer Menswear Fund and he was sponsored again by Woolmark for his AW15 collection. He launched two collaborations: one with Wool and The Gang, to create a joint line of knitted accessories, and one with knitwear specialised brand Unmade. In the same year Raeburn received the award for Best Emerging Designer at the GQ Men of the Year Awards, and later on he launched his first footwear menswear and womenswear joint collections with Clarks.

At the beginning of 2016, Raeburn's "Layers of Natural Innovation" partnership with The Woolmark company was shown at the ICA during London Fashion Week in celebration of the versatility of Merino Wool, before being shortlisted for a third year for the BFC / GQ Designer Menswear Fashion Fund. That year Raeburn also launched a collaboration with MCM.

In Autumn 2018, US lifestyle brand Timberland announced its appointment of Raeburn as global creative director of the brand.

== Style ==
American Vogue's August 2010 issue highlighted Raeburn's contribution to all things green with the advice to "Remember the four R's – Reduce, Reuse, Recycle and Raeburn", accompanied by a Mario Testino shoot of Blake Lively wearing a Raeburn Duffle Coat. After viewing his Autumn/Winter 2011 London Fashion Week presentation at the disused Aldwych tube station, Style.com stated, "it's not unreasonable to assert that Christopher Raeburn is the single most radical designer working today".

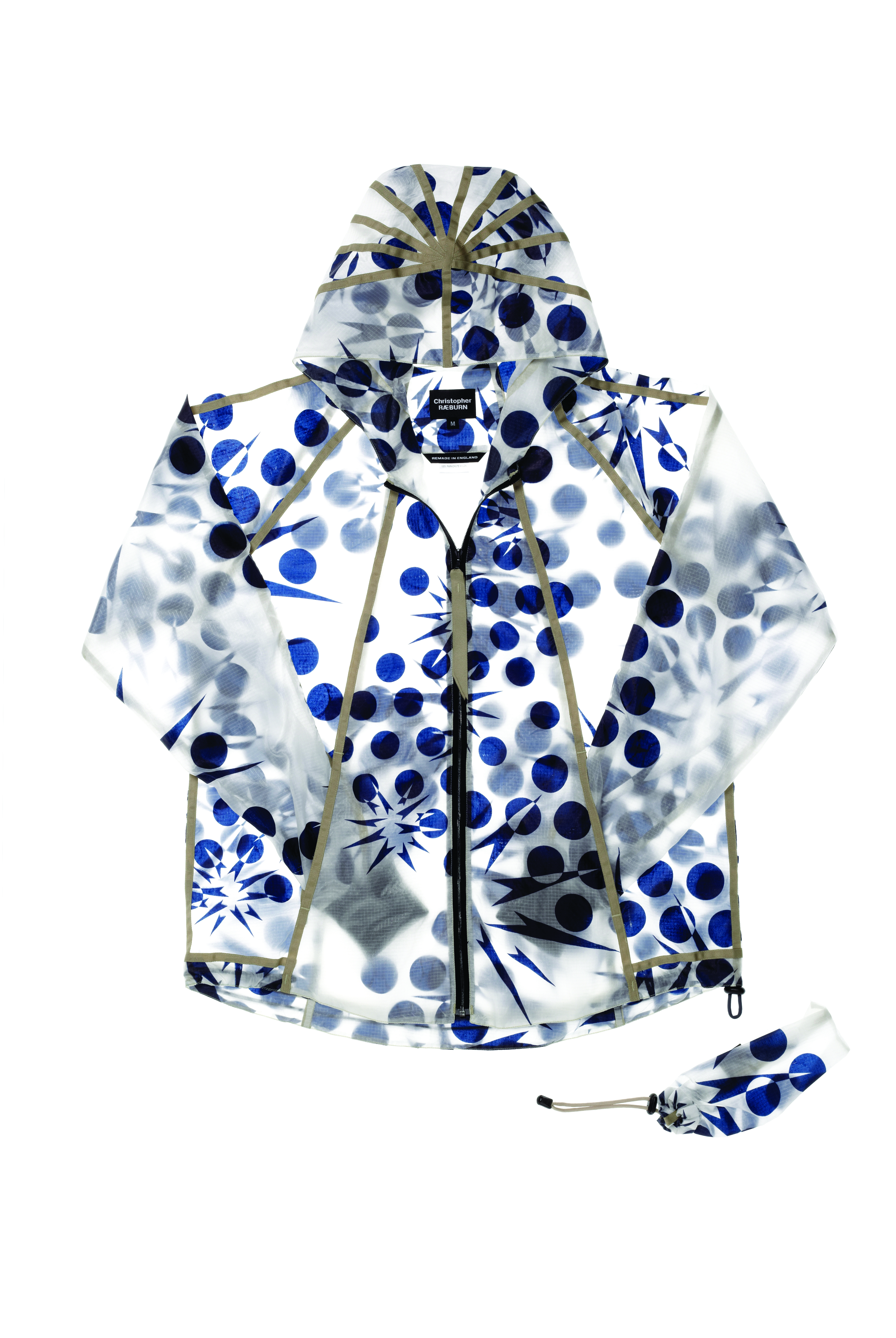
Raeburn jacket remade from parachute.

== Awards ==
- 2008: Featured in Hywel Davies' publication '100 New Designers'.
- 2009: Award from the International Ethical Fashion Forum
- 2010 and 2011: Rising Star at the UK Fashion and Textiles Awards
- 2011: British Fashion Award for Emerging Talent Menswear
- 2013: Designer of the Year at the UKFT Awards
- 2014: Menswear Brand of the Year at the UKFT Awards
- 2015: Best Emerging Designer at the GQ Men of the Year Awards
- 2019: Honorary professorship and Lifetime Achievement Award by the Glasgow Caledonian University (GCU)
- 2020: Brand of the Year (RÆBURN) at the Drapers Sustainable Fashion Awards
- 2020: Fashion Award 2020 (RÆBURN), selected as one of the Honourees of the Environment category
- 2021: Brand of the Year (RÆBURN) at the Drapers Sustainable Fashion Awards
- 2022: One of the Winners of the Common Objective Leadership Award (RÆBURN)
- 2022: Brand of the Year (RÆBURN) at the Drapers Sustainable Fashion Awards
- 2022: Most Sustainable Store Design (RÆBURN’s Marshall Street, Carnaby Store) in the Drapers Sustainable Fashion Awards
- 2022: Zalando Sustainability Award Finalist

== Collaborations ==
Year	With	Collaborations	Sources
2011	Victorinox	'Remade in Switzerland' collection (launch during New York Fashion Week)	
2012	Moncler	Outerwear collection 'Moncler R'	
2013	Rapha	Capsule collection of city-riding garments named 'Rapha Raeburn'	
2013	Victorinox	Raeburn x Victorinox 'Festival Ready' project launched; consisting of an 11-piece collection of camping gear and outdoor-wear	
2013	Fred Perry	Limited edition polo shirt	
2014	Oki Ni	SS15 collection	
2014	Barbour		
2015	Oki Ni	Video campaign showing how vintage materials can be re-created	
2015	Lavazza	London Collections: Men, using an elliptical shark print	
2015	Clarks	Raeburn's first footwear collection, received a sponsorship from Woolmark for both menswear and womenswear	
2016	MCM	Sustainable ready to wear and accessories collection, "Made to Move"	
2016	Disney	Collection of bags which pay homage to Mickey and Minnie	
2017	Save The Duck	Collection of recycled and animal-friendly outerwear presented at Pitti Uomo and continued for Spring/Summer 2018	
2017	Instrmnt	Line of watches	
2017	Porter Yoshida	Porter Stand in Tokyo	
2017	Palladium	Footwear collaboration launched at London Fashion Week: Men's	
2017	Eastpak	Range of backpacks remade from old camouflage jackets	
2017	Victoria and Albert Museum	Redesign of staff uniform	
2018	Finisterre	Capsule collection of ready to wear and accessories inspired by oceans	
2018	CanO Water	Design recyclable water can to replace plastic bottles from London Zoo	
2018	Secret Cinema	Dress actors for Blade Runner - The Final Cut	
2018	Umbro	Capsule collection for the FIFA World Cup in Russia	
2018	Timberland	Ready to wear collaboration at London Fashion Week Men's, which deconstructed old Timberland pieces	
2019	The North Face	Capsule collection of bags remade from North Face tents that can no longer be repaired	
2019	Timberland	Ready to wear collection including accessories and footwear, using organic and recycled materials	
2019	Design agency LAYER	Furniture project 'The Canopy Collection' launched for London Design Festival in September 2019 with pieces featured recycled ex-military parachute and steel frames	
2019	Design Museum	Moving To Mars exhibition with their New Horizons collection, including repurposed solar blankets and parachutes	
2020	Depop	Depop × RÆBURN Reversible Bucket Hat project	
2020	Ragnar Axelsson	Autumn/Winter 2020 collection	
2021	Aesop		
2021	Massimo Osti	Reviving Left Hand and ST95	
2021	Onward Advanced System	Outwear collection	
2021	Boardies	Swimwear capsule consisting of recycled materials and animal print	
2021	Zalando - The North Fac	The North Face RENEWED by RÆBURN, a series of limited edition Panda Rucksacks Upcycled original The North Face garments	

The Lab E20 opened in July; a 3,500sq ft space produced and designed by Raeburn. It will form Get Living’s new creative hub in East Village, London.
