= Majestic Athletic =

American textile company

Majestic Athletic, Ltd.
- Company type: Subsidiary
- Industry: Textile
- Founded: 1976; 50 years ago
- Founder: Faust Capobianco III
- Headquarters: Easton, Pennsylvania, U.S.
- Area served: Worldwide
- Products: T-shirts, hoodies, pants, hats
- Parent: Fanatics, Inc. (2017–present)
- Website: majesticathletic.com

Majestic Athletic is an American textile company headquartered in Easton, Pennsylvania, with manufacturing facilities in Easton, Pennsylvania. Majestic currently designs, manufactures and markets licensed casual wear, such as t-shirts, hoodies, pants and hats, through its licenses of several amateur and professional sports leagues of the US, such as the NCAA at the amateur level, and the NFL, NHL, NBA, MLS at the pro level.

Majestic was the official on-field uniform of Major League Baseball (MLB) from 2005 until December 2019, when it was replaced by Nike. The company is a subsidiary of online retailer Fanatics, Inc., which acquired it from VF Corporation in 2017.

== History ==
Majestic Athletic was founded in 1976 by Faust Capobianco III. Prior to that time, the Capobianco family operated Maria Rose Fashions. As fashion apparel production shifted from the Lehigh Valley to the south, the company shifted focus to the athletic teamwear business.

In 1982, Majestic batting practice jersey made its debut with the MLB. Two years later, the company signed its first national licensing agreement with MLB. The company made its NFL fan wear debut in 1989.

In August 2003, Majestic Athletic won a $500 million five-year contract, starting in 2005, as the "exclusive supplier of uniforms, jackets, T-shirts, fleece and turtlenecks to all 30 big-league teams" of MLB. Majestic had already been making official jerseys for 15 MLB teams at the time of the announcement.

In 2004, after 22 years of producing MLB batting practice jerseys and fan fashions, Majestic became the sole provider of on-field uniforms for all 30 MLB teams. The Majestic uniforms debuted on field in the 2005 season.

VF Corporation acquired Majestic in 2007, and two years later the "VF Licensed Sports Group" was created. In March 2015, Majestic renewed its contract with MLB through 2019. In January 2016, Majestic finalized a contract extension with the NFL.

In 2015, Major League Baseball added the Majestic Athletic Always Game Award as the third, all-MLB category in the Players Choice Awards. On December 5, 2016, it was announced that Under Armour would replace Majestic as the official, on-field uniform provider of Major League Baseball, starting in 2020. On May 18, 2017, Major League Baseball announced that the switch to Under Armour would take place in 2019, one year earlier than previously announced. On January 25, 2019, Major League Baseball announced that Nike, not Under Armour, would replace Majestic as the official, on-field uniform provider for the league beginning with the 2020 season. Majestic continued to provide uniforms through the 2019 season.

On January 17, 2017, Australian Football League (AFL) club Brisbane announced their partnership with Majestic, marking Majestic's first sponsorship within the AFL.

On April 4, 2017, VF Corporation announced it was selling off the Licensed Sports Group portion of its business, which includes Majestic, to sports apparel retailer Fanatics, Inc.
