= Eric C. Wiseman =

Businessman in the apparel industry

Eric C. Wiseman (born 1955) is a businessman in the apparel industry.

Wiseman was president, chief executive officer and chairman of the board (since 2008) of VF Corporation, replaced by Steve Rendle as CEO on January 1, 2017 while remaining as chairman. He is on the board of directors of Lowe's Companies Inc., CIGNA Corporation, and the Retail Industry Leaders Association (RILA).

Wiseman has a Bachelor's Degree in business and an MBA from Wake Forest University. He is married to Susan Wiseman.

Together with his wife Wiseman donated $1m to expand the 23,000 sq. ft. SciQuarium at the Greensboro Science Center, which "marks the single largest private gift to the center in the history of the 57-year-old organization."
