= Lucy Activewear =

American women's clothing company

Lucy Activewear, Inc.
- Type: Former Subsidiary
- Founded: November 1999; 27 years ago (as Lucy.com); Portland, Oregon, U.S.
- Successor: The North Face
- Headquarters: Alameda, California, U.S.
- Number of locations: 60 stores
- Area served: Arizona, California, Colorado, Connecticut, Illinois, Maryland, Massachusetts, Michigan, Minnesota, Nevada, New Jersey, Oregon, Texas, Virginia, Washington and Washington D.C.
- Key people
- Products: Clothing
- Revenue: $57 million (2007)
- Parent: VF Corporation

Lucy Activewear (sometimes styled as "lucy" rather than "Lucy"), formerly known as Lucy.com, was an American clothing retailer based in Alameda, California. Founded in November 1999 by former Nike executives, it specialized in activewear for women including clothing intended for use during yoga. It designed, manufactured and sold its own product lines including jackets, bras, tops, and bottoms.

Initially an online-only retailer, Lucy opened brick and mortar stores in 2002 after the bursting of the dot-com bubble; for several years, the company completely shut down its web store. It was at that time the company changed its name from "Lucy.com" to "Lucy Activewear". Though based in Portland, it did not open a store there in 2002 and did not have a retail presence in Oregon until it opened stores in Portland's Pearl District and Bridgeport Village two years later. Lucy did have 60 stores located across the United States, primarily in California.

It was headquartered out of the KOIN Center in downtown Portland.

Lucy Activewear, Inc. was acquired on August 24, 2007 for $110 million by North Carolina–based VF Corporation (NYSE: VFC).

In 2017, Lucy closed a majority of its stores and was merged into The North Face by the VF Corporation.
