= Ella Moss =

American clothing brand

ella moss Logo

Ella Moss is a fashion clothing brand, based in Los Angeles and owned by Delta Galil Industries. The company was founded by designer Pamela Protzel-Scott in 2001.

== Background ==
Protzel-Scott attended Pasadena's Art Center studying graphic design, and decided to transfer to The Fashion Institute of Design & Merchandising in Los Angeles after discovering passion and interest in fashion. Following college, Protzel-Scott was hired by Moise Emquies, to work at his company, Mo Industries.^{[1]} After working on a project together for 3 years, the two decided to team up to create the line Ella Moss. The origin of the brand's name was taken from Pamela's nickname (Ella) and Moise's nickname (Moss). They describe the line in three words: "Hip, quirky, fashionable". Protzel-Scott explained that her main inspiration for design was art, fashion, people, traveling, and Parisian flea markets.

=== Notable recognition ===
Ella Moss gained recognition following a Sex and the City episode where Sarah Jessica Parker's character was seen in a dress from the brand. Other celebrities that have been styled in Ella Moss clothing include Angelina Jolie, Kate Hudson Selena Gomez, and Christina Aguilera.

== Store fronts ==
In September 2011, Ella Moss opened the first of two store fronts. The storefront was located in Newport Beach California in Fashion Island, a shopping center. The store would have Ella Moss and other lines such as Ella Girl, and Little Ella. After the first store opened a second location was opened in November 2013, in San Francisco. Both of these locations are no longer open. Ella Moss was once sold at department stores and boutiques. As of 2024, the brand can be purchased at Costco and Amazon.

== Acquisition ==
VF Corp, an American apparel and footwear company, owned 1/3 of stake in Mo Industries, which housed Ella Moss. VF Corp acquired the remaining 2/3s in 2009 for $161 million with an additional $47 million in debt. In 2016, 7 for Mankind and Splendid/Ella Moss were purchased by Delta Galil Industries, an Israeli textile firm from VF Corp, for 120 million dollars. Delta Galil's chief executive at the time, Issac Dabah secured a deal from VF Corp. due to the companies brand's declining sales. Plans following the acquisition included "closing stores that had declining sales and rebuilding brands" according to Dabah.

== Sources ==
- https://web.archive.org/web/20081217060035/http://www.ellamoss.com/thestory.html
