= Bracken Darrell =

American businessman

Bracken P. Darrell
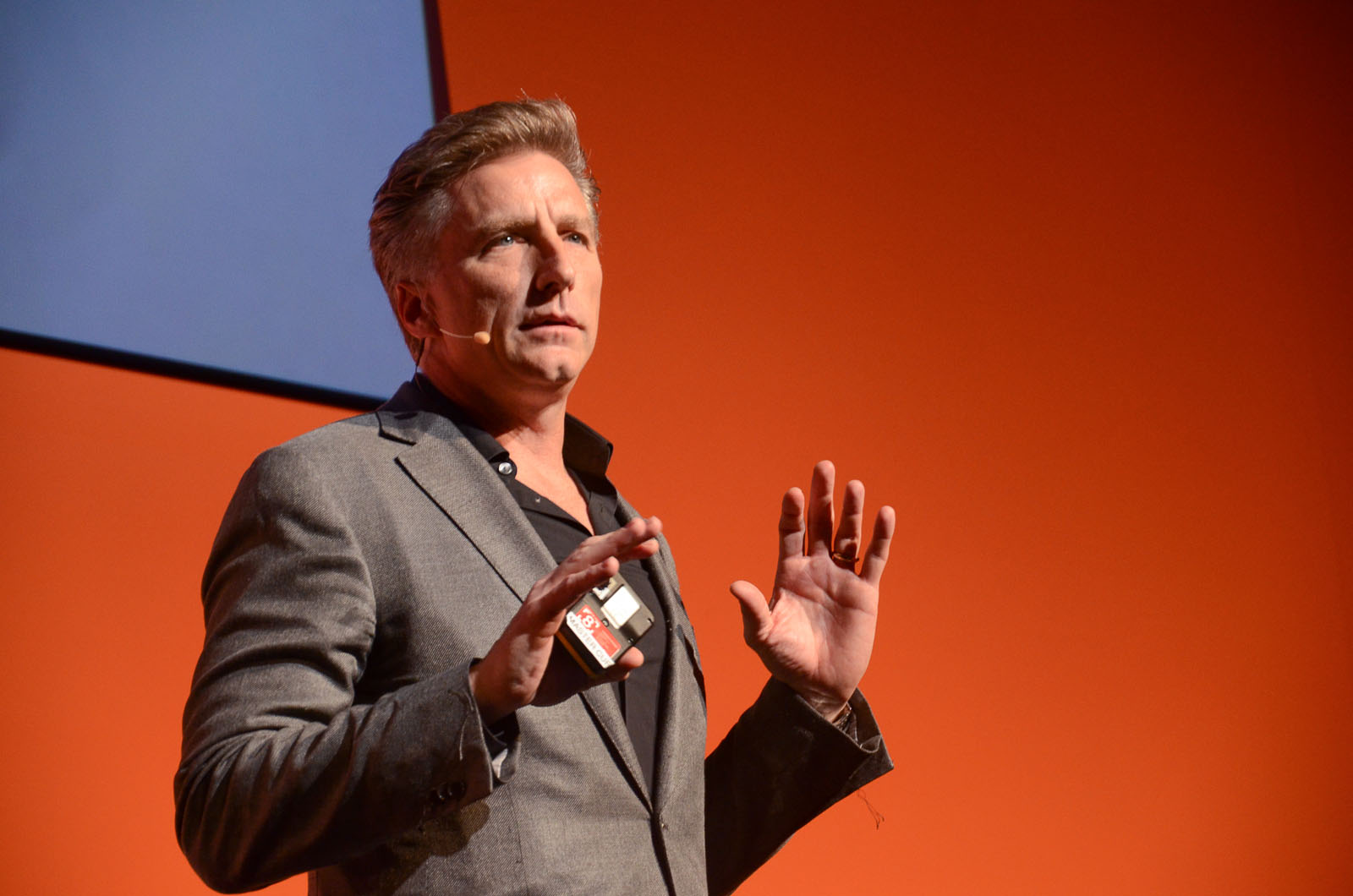
- Born: Owensboro, Kentucky, United States
- Education: Hendrix College (B.A., 1985); Harvard Business School (MBA, 1989)
- Occupation: Businessman
- Known for: CEO of VF Corporation, former CEO of Logitech
- Title: Chief executive officer, VF Corporation

Bracken P. Darrell is the CEO of VF Corporation and the former CEO of Logitech.

== Early life and education ==
Darrell grew up in Owensboro, Kentucky, as one of four siblings. His brother, Bart Darrell, was the president of Kentucky Wesleyan College.

Darrell graduated from Daviess County High School in 1981. In 1985 he earned a BA degree in English literature from Hendrix College and, in 1989, earned his MBA from Harvard Business School.

== Career ==
After graduating college and before earning his MBA, Darrell worked in public accounting for two years, and was eventually hired to do international auditing for PepsiCo. Over his career he has held various positions at General Electric, Gillette and Arthur Andersen. At Procter & Gamble, he was the president of the Braun division and led the turnaround of Old Spice deodorant. Darrell joined Whirlpool Corporation in 2008, where he became an executive vice president. In 2012, he joined Logitech as president, and became CEO in early 2013. In June 2023, Darrell became the CEO of VF Corporation.

Darrell has been on the board of directors for Life Biosciences, an anti-aging startup, and was a trustee for Hendrix College.
