= Therm-a-Rest =

American brand of outdoor equipment

- Type: Private, subsidiary
- Industry: Outdoor equipment manufacturing
- Founded: 1972; 54 years ago
- Founder: John Burroughs, Jim Lea, Neil Anderson
- Headquarters: Seattle, Washington, U.S.
- Products: Camp Chairs, Cots, Pillows, Camp Quilts, Sleeping bags, Sleeping pads
- Parent: Cascade Designs
- Website: www.thermarest.com/home

Therm-a-Rest is a Seattle, Washington-based outdoor product company specializing in camping mattresses, sleeping bags, camp chairs, cots, and pillows. The company was initially named Cascade Designs, which is now the parent company of Therm-a-Rest and other outdoor brands.

== History ==
Therm-a-Rest was founded in 1972 by Jim Lea, John Burroughs, and Neil Anderson. Therm-a-Rest began as a line of self-inflating camping mattresses, invented in the early 1970s by two former Boeing engineers and avid backpackers.

== Products ==
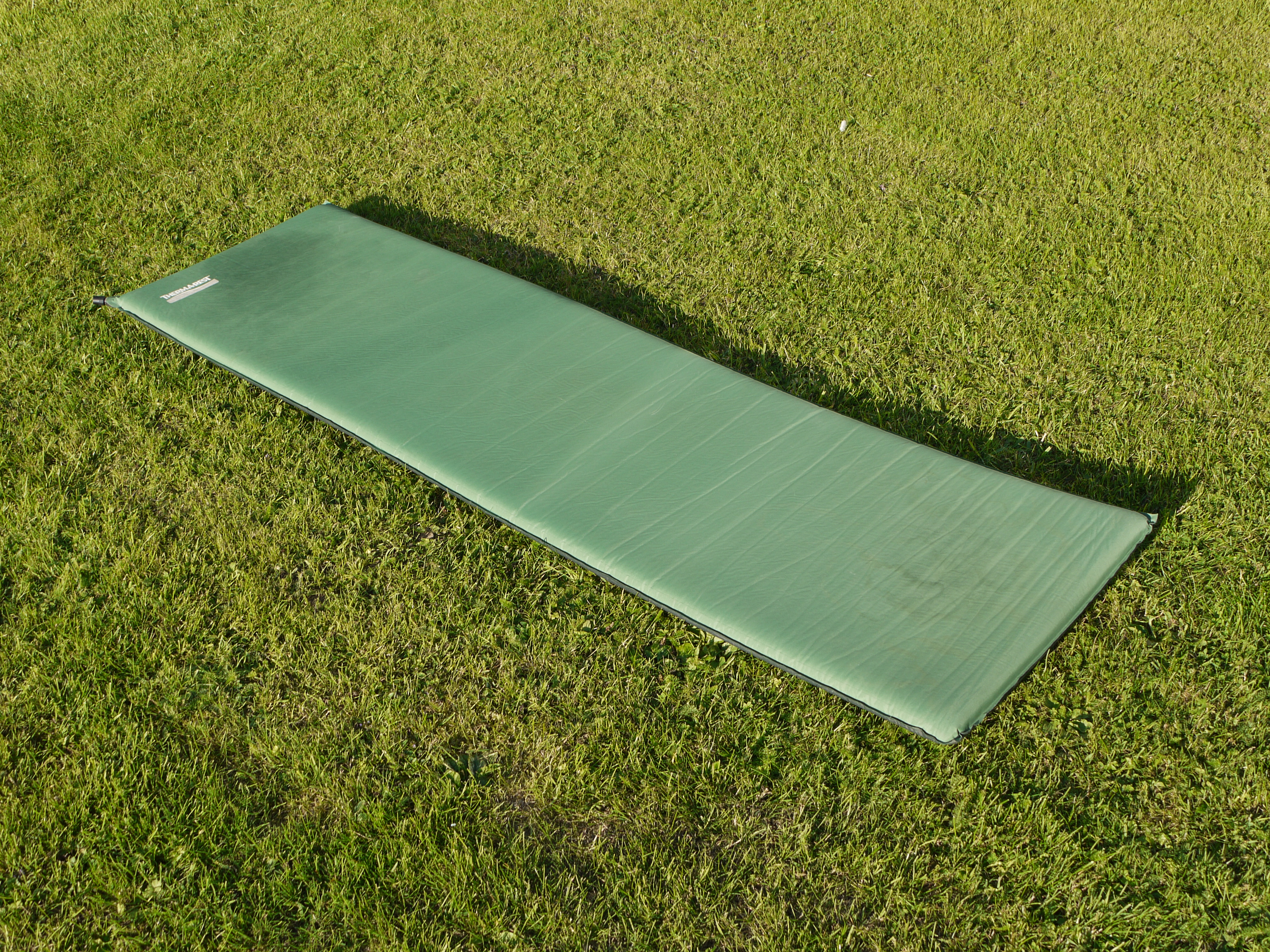
Therm-a-Rest self-inflating mattress

=== Self-inflating mattress ===
A Therm-a-Rest self-inflating mattress consists of an airtight nylon fabric envelope filled with a sheet of low density, open-cell polyurethane foam. When a valve is opened the foam expands and draws air into the mattress. When the mattress has fully inflated, the user simply closes the valve. To increase firmness a few breaths of air can be blown into the mattress. To pack the mattress the valve is opened and it is rolled up tightly to force the air out, whereupon the valve is closed to prevent re-inflation.
