= Red Kap =

American workwear company

- Formerly: Central Overall Manufacturing
- Industry: Personal protective equipment
- Founded: 1923; 103 years ago
- Owner: Workwear Outfitters (2021-present)
- Website: www.redkap.com

Red Kap is an American workwear company headquartered in Nashville, Tennessee with production in Central American countries.

== History ==
In 1923, Claude H. Williams, J.G. Hayes, William Wirt Harlin, Sr. and Alexander F. Harlin founded Central Overall Manufacturing, specializing in bib overalls for men and boys. In 1939, the name was changed to Red Kap, after Red Cap Smoking Tobacco.

In 1947, it shifted focus from retail and mail order markets to development of clothing that could withstand industrial washing. The company teamed up with a network of laundries to pick up, deliver, and supply fresh business uniforms.

In the 1960s, it opened the industry's first apparel research and development laboratory, went public, and became a part of Blue Bell, Inc. In 1986, Red Kap was acquired by North Carolina–based VF Corporation (NYSE: VFC), making it the world's largest publicly held apparel company.

In the 1990s and 2000s, the brand provided apparel programs for major car companies like Ford, Honda and GM.

In 2021, Red Kap was sold to Redwood Capital Investments, LLC, and later became part of the standalone company Workwear Outfitters.

== See also ==
- Levi's
- Dickies
- Carhartt
- Cabela's
