= Cadence (gait) =

Number of steps per unit time

Cadence in sports involving running is a measure of speed calculated as the total number of full cycles (of both a right and left foot strike) taken within a given period of time, often expressed in steps per minute or cycles per minute. It is used as a measure of athletic performance.

It is similar to cadence in cycling. In running and racewalking, increasing cadence can be beneficial.

In sports such as weightlifting or bodybuilding, cadence can refer to the speed or time taken to complete a single lift, rather than how many repetitions of a lift are completed.

== See also ==
- Gait
