= Eastpak =

American worldwide lifestyle brand

- Formerly: Eastern Canvas Products
- Type: Subsidiary
- Industry: Retail, fashion
- Founded: 1952; 74 years ago Boston, Massachusetts, US
- Founder: Bernard Godfrey & Monte Goldman
- Headquarters: Bornem, Belgium and Stabio, Switzerland
- Area served: Worldwide
- Products: Bags, luggage, accessories, apparel
- Parent: VF Corporation (2000–present)
- Website: www.eastpak.com

Eastpak is an American worldwide lifestyle brand founded in Boston, Massachusetts, specializing in the design, development, manufacturing and worldwide marketing and distribution of a range of products including bags, backpacks, travel gear and accessories. In 1952, the company began as Eastern Canvas Products USA, Inc., producing bags and packs for the U.S. military before focusing on the consumer market in 1976 under the brand name Eastpak. It is part of the VF Corporation brand portfolio.

== History ==
=== Founding ===
Eastpak was founded in 1952 by Bernard Godfrey of Newton, Massachusetts, as Eastern Canvas Products USA Inc. He was later joined by his son, William, and a third partner, Monte Goldman, and began by specializing in safety equipment for the U.S. Army. However, the company's direction changed dramatically when Goldman's son, Mark Goldman, joined the company in 1976. He transformed the company's retail product line into a consumer brand and launched the first line-up of bags and packs at a sportswear trade fair in Chicago in 1977. Norman Jacobs joined the company in 1980 and, with partner Mark Goldman, claimed a market-leading share of the U.S. college market on the East Coast throughout most of the 1980s and early 1990s.

=== Brand evolution ===
In 1985, Eastpak introduced bright colors and prints to the bag collections. The company became the first bag brand to offer a lifetime product warranty (for legal reasons, the warranty is limited to 30 years). The evolution towards a bolder, more original style was also matched in the mid-1980s by increasingly provocative advertising campaigns featuring, e.g., the controversial comic-book character Andy Capp. Eastpak entered the luggage market in 1999 with the first wheeled trolley produced for the consumer market. V.F. Corporation acquired the Eastpak in 2000, where it joined other brands such as JanSport, The North Face, Kipling, Lee, and Wrangler.

=== International expansion ===
Eastpak's first export markets were in Asia, with early successes in Japan, Korea, Singapore, and the Philippines.

Eastpak was first introduced to the European market in 1986 by the Frenchman Kostia Belkin. He met with Mark Goldman and Norman Jacobs in Boston, who convinced him to start distributing Eastpak products in Europe. Belkin then expanded distribution throughout France, Switzerland, and other European countries from 1986 to 1995, a trend soon followed by other brands such as Airwalk and DCSHOES. Thirty-five years later, although distributed worldwide, France is the largest market for the Eastpak brand.

In 2021, Eastpak relaunched into the US market through their own e-commerce site.

== Projects ==
=== Designer collaborations ===
In 2004, Eastpak partnered with Belgian fashion designer Walter Van Beirendonck. Since then, Eastpak has produced collections in collaboration with designers including Kris Van Assche, Christopher Shannon, Raf Simons and many others.
