= Eagle Creek (company) =

American baggage company

- Industry: Retail
- Founded: 1975
- Headquarters: Steamboat Springs, Colorado, United States
- Area served: Worldwide
- Key people: Travis Campbell (President)
- Products: Luggage; Accessories
- Website: www.eaglecreek.com

Eagle Creek is an American luggage manufacturer headquartered in Steamboat Springs, Colorado. The company was founded in 1975 in the San Jacinto Mountains of California, and in 2007 was acquired by VF Corporation. Originally supporting California, the company has evolved to be an international wholesaler with distribution to Canada, Europe, and other countries.

== History ==
Eagle Creek was founded in 1975 by Steve and Nona Barker in the San Jacinto Mountains of California, where they ran a retail store called Mountain People selling custom mountain packs. Production began in a 1,500 square feet (140 m^{2}) manufacturing facility in Solana Beach, California.

After beginning negotiations in late 2006, Eagle Creek was acquired by VF Outdoor, Inc., a subsidiary of clothing company VF Corporation, in January 2007.

On June 10, 2021, VF, the parent company of Eagle Creek, announced that it would retire the Eagle Creek brand by the end of 2021, citing strategic and financial difficulties.

On September 8, 2021, it was announced that the former president of emerging brands of VF Corporation, Travis Campbell, would acquire the Eagle Creek brand. The sale includes all Eagle Creek assets and liabilities.

== See also ==
- Baggage#Types of luggage
