= Mountain Safety Research =

Manufacturer of mountaineering equipment

Mountain Safety Research, Inc.
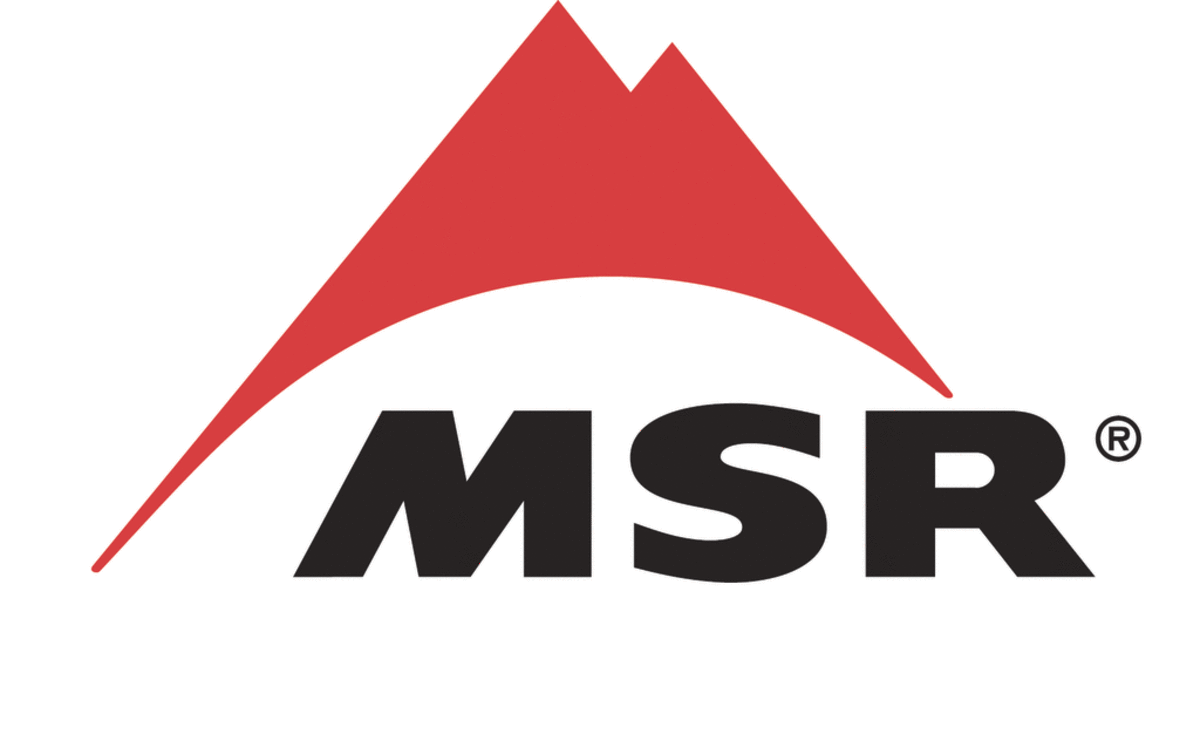
- Type: Subsidiary
- Industry: Sporting goods and outdoor gear
- Founded: 1969; 57 years ago
- Headquarters: Seattle, Washington, U.S.
- Key people: Larry Penberthy, Founder
- Parent: Cascade Designs
- Website: www.msrgear.com

Mountain Safety Research, or MSR, is a producer of camping, hiking and mountaineering equipment, such as portable stoves, water filters, snowshoes, and tents. While specializing in lightweight and technical equipment, MSR's gear is designed for a wide range of outdoor enthusiasts from novice to expert mountaineers. It is located in Seattle, Washington, and owned by Cascade Designs.

== History ==
MSR began as a newsletter in 1969 that covered topics around mountaineering safety. In 1973, Larry Penberthy (1916–2001) developed the MSR Model 9 camp stove, a design which used white gas and was relatively fearsome in cold weather. He separated the stove burner from then small fuel tanks, and then pressurized auxiliary fuel bottles as the tank, and used a better wind screen. Cold weather mountaineers loved it because it was great for melting ice and snow into water. It roared, and was nicknamed Krakatoa. Not good for omelettes ... it did not simmer well. This evolved into the Whisperlite stove, a multi fuel stove capable of running on a wide range of liquid fuels. He also designed an ice axe that was supposed to dig into the ice better and stop a slide. Penberthy also introduced aluminum-shafted ice axes; metal axes have replaced earlier wooden-shaft designs.

The company was acquired by REI in 1981. In 2000, MSR merged with Edgeworks, the manufacturer of Moss, Walrus and Armadillo tents. Shortly afterwards, these brands were discontinued and all tents by the company sold as MSR. In August 2001, MSR was acquired by Cascade Designs. Founder Larry Penberthy died later that year in November.

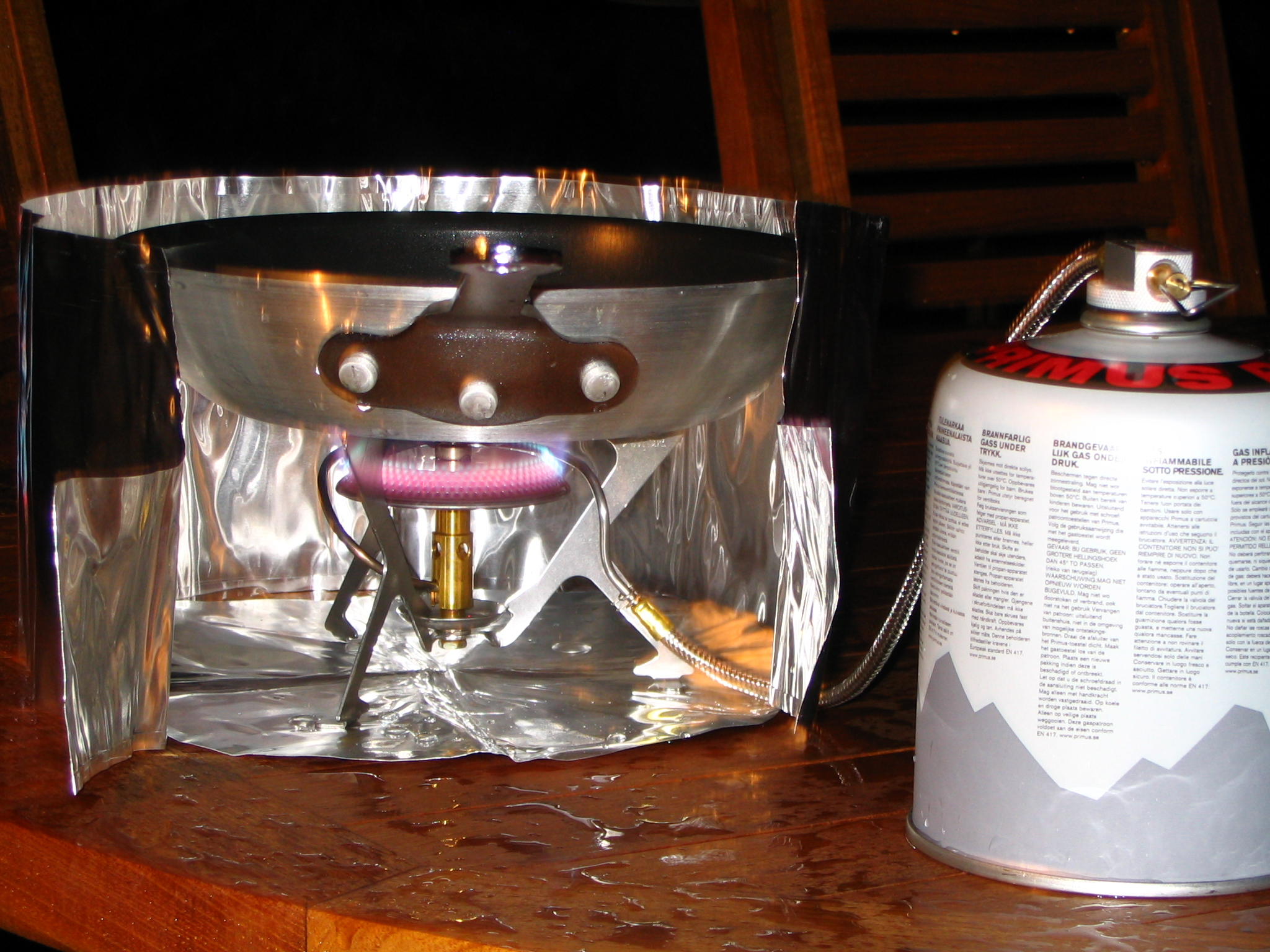
MSR WindPro portable stove with heat reflector and wind shield

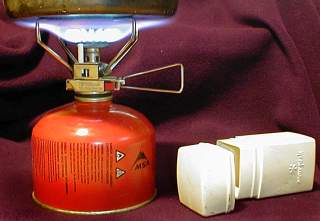
An MSR propane/isobutane fuel canister and Snow Peak Giga Power portable stove in operation

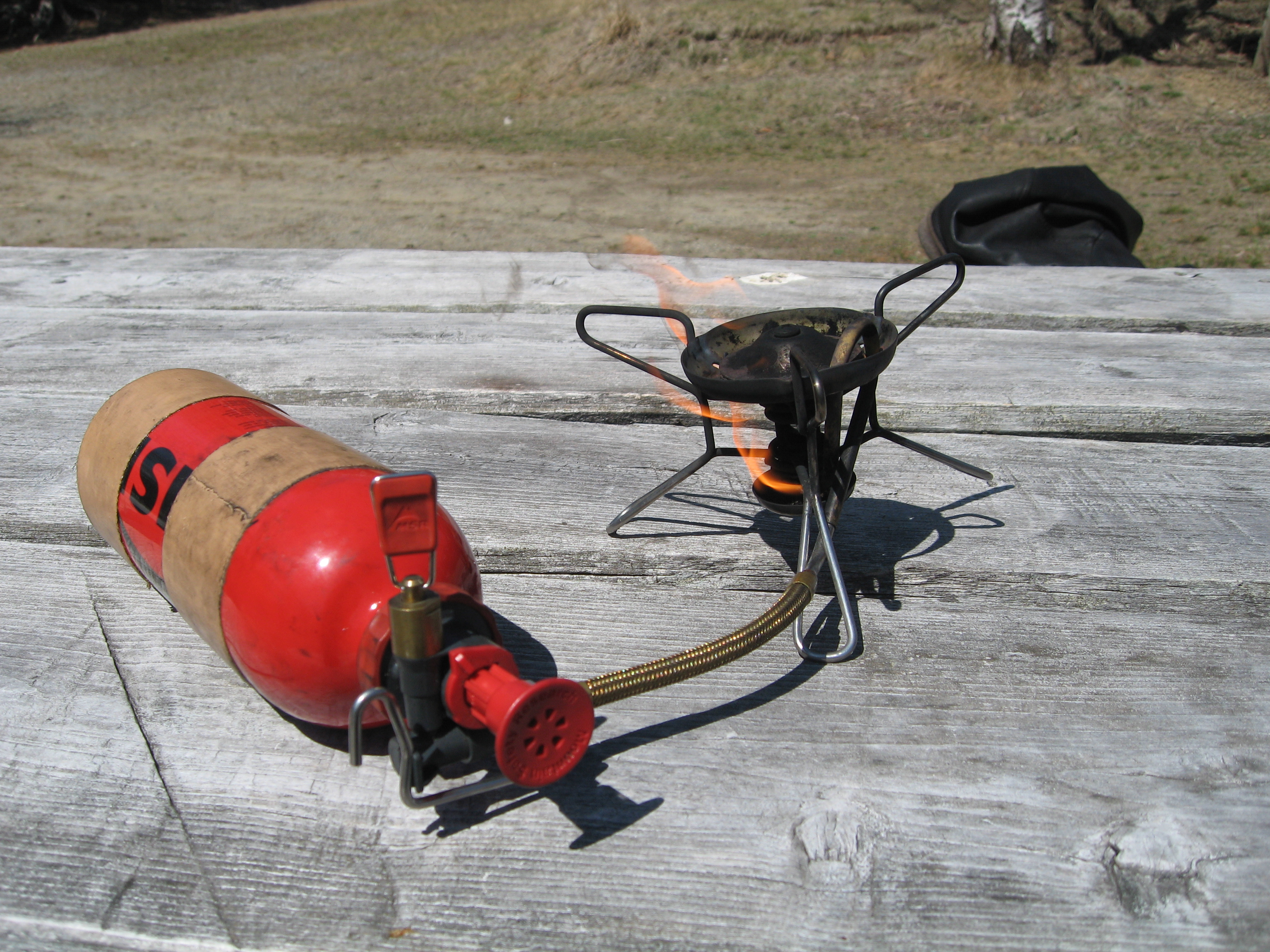
Priming an MSR Whisperlite International stove (first generation)
