= Kipling (brand) =

Retail brand

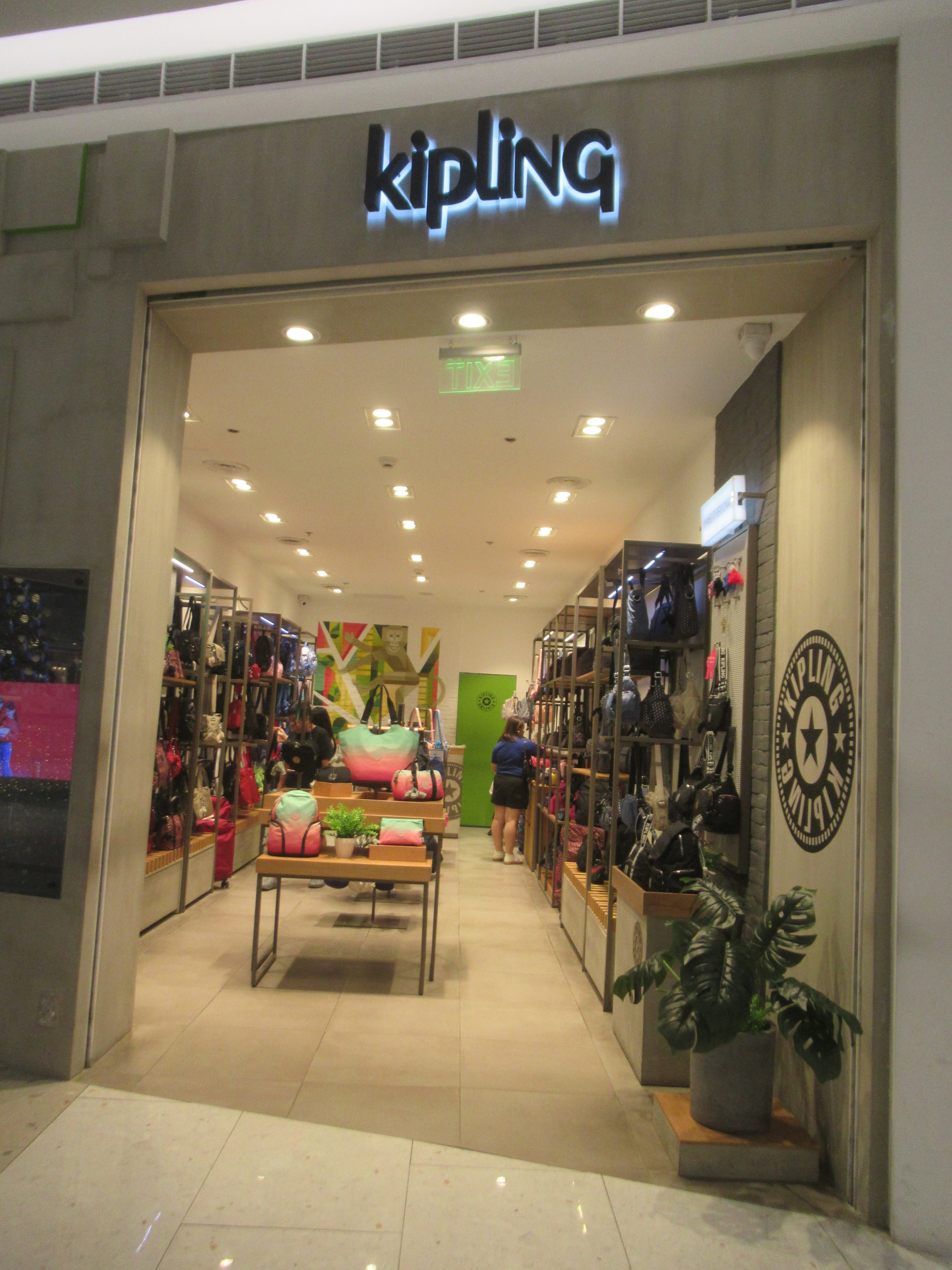
- Kipling store in the Philippines
- Company type: Subsidiary
- Industry: Retail, fashion
- Founded: 1987; 39 years ago in Antwerp, Belgium
- Headquarters: Antwerp
- Area served: Worldwide
- Products: Bags, luggage, accessories, totes
- Parent: VF Corporation (2004–present)
- Website: https://www.kipling.com/

Kipling is a brand selling handbags, backpacks, totes, luggage and other accessories. It was founded in 1987 in Antwerp, Belgium. Kipling has been a part of VF Corporation since 2004. Kipling has 250 employees across its corporate offices in Antwerp, New Jersey, São Paulo, and Hong Kong. Kipling bags are sold in more than 80 countries internationally and can be found in more than 7,500 stores.

== History ==
Kipling was founded in 1987 in Antwerp by designer Xavier Kegels (who also founded Hedgren) and Paul Van De Velde, who were joined by a third partner, Vincent Haverbeke. The name was inspired by Rudyard Kipling who wrote the children’s story The Jungle Book.

In June 2004, VF Corporation, an American worldwide apparel and footwear company, acquired Kipling. Kipling became part of VF's "sportswear" range.

=== Timeline ===
- 1986: The original founders of Kipling decide to create a new bags company in Antwerp, Belgium
- 1989: Kipling goes to North America and Japan
- 1993: Kipling goes to Central America
- 2004: Kipling joins the portfolio of VF

In 2023, in light of the release of the Barbie Movie, Kipling and Barbie introduce a collaboration for handbags. Other collaborations include Minju Kim, and Hello Kitty (since 2022).

== Brand and products ==
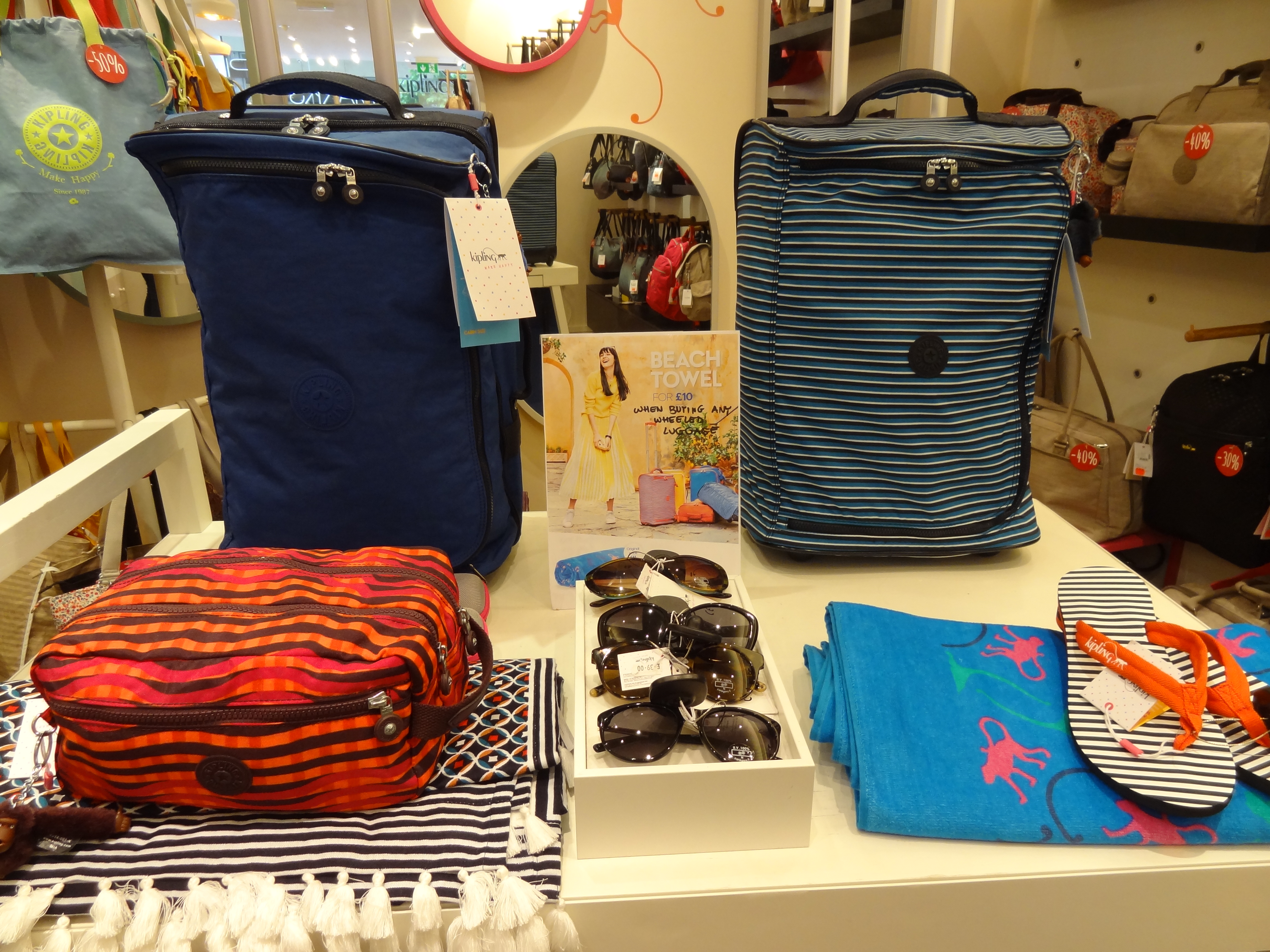
Kipling products

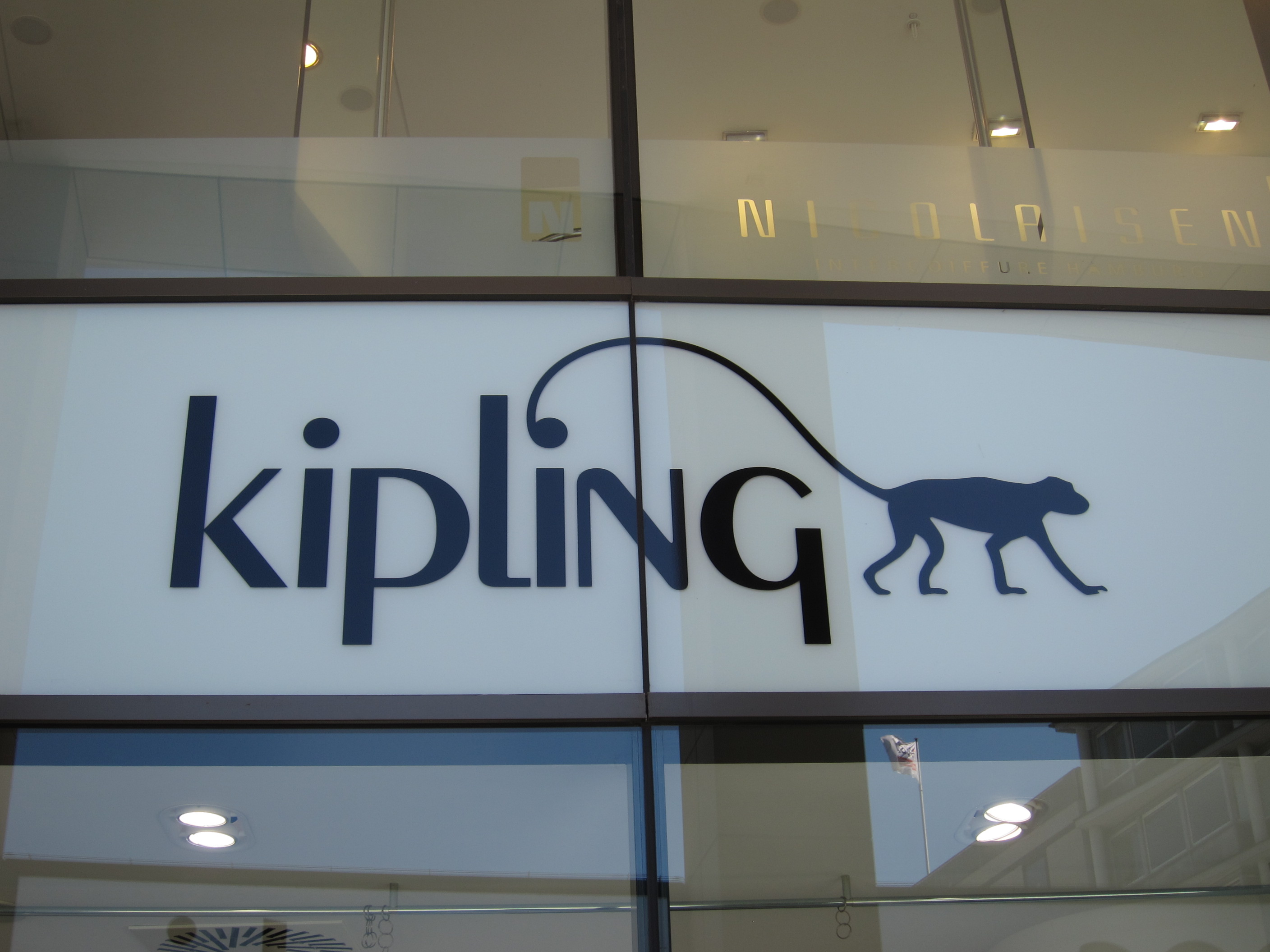
Kipling monkey logo sign

Kipling badge

Kipling is known for its casual-styled accessories, bags, backpacks and luggage. Besides its crinkle nylon fabric, the brand produces bags in many other materials. Its offering ranges from pouches, wallets and small key hangers to handbags, cross-bodies, totes, backpacks, weekenders and luggage. The brand is also popular for its bright, heavy-duty travel pieces, as well as for its schoolbags among kids.

Kipling is known for their signature furry monkey keychain.

== Collaborations ==
- 1991 - Perrier
- 1995 - Ford
- 2007 - Fergie
- 2008 - Gloria Coelho
- 2009 - Cathy Pill
- 2009 - Girls from Omsk
- 2010 - El Delgado Buil
- 2010 - Peter Pilotto
- 2011 - JCDC
- 2013 - Helena Christensen
- 2014 - Natalie Joos
- 2015 - Eva Mouton
- 2017 - Snow White and the Seven Dwarfs
- 2018 - Alice in Wonderland
- 2018 - Star Wars
- 2018 - Helen Lee
- 2019 - Angel Chen
- 2019 - Christine Lau
- 2019 - Mickey Mouse
- 2019 - Frozen II
- 2020 - Pac-Man
- 2020 - Mickey & Friends
- 2020 - Keith Haring
- 2022 - Woodstock
- 2022 - MTV
- 2022 - Anna Sui
- 2022 - Pantone
- 2022 - Hello Kitty
