= JanSport =

American backpack manufacturer

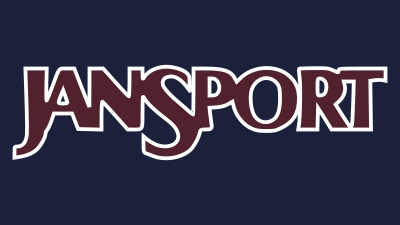
- Product type: Backpacks
- Current owner: VF Corporation (1986–present)
- Introduced: 1967; 59 years ago Seattle, Washington, U.S.
- Previous owners: Blue Bell Overall Company (1967–1986)
- Website: www.jansport.com

JanSport is an American brand of backpacks and collegiate apparel, now owned by VF Corporation, one of the world's largest apparel companies. JanSport is the world's largest backpack maker. Nearly half of all small backpacks sold in the United States are produced by JanSport and its sister brand The North Face, also owned by VF Corporation.

== History ==
Murray Pletz (who changed his name to Murray McCrory in the early 1980s), an industrial design student, designed a backpack that used aluminum in its flexible frame. In January of 1966, Murray Pletz bought his girlfriend, Jan Lewis, a $180 sewing machine to sew the backpack. Pletz entered the finished backpack project in a design contest sponsored by the Aluminum Company of America and won the prize.

Using the contest award money, JanSport was founded in 1967 in Seattle, Washington, United States, by Murray Pletz, his future wife (they married two years later) Janis "Jan" Lewis (for whom the company is named), and his father Norman Pletz. JanSport innovated with a panel-loading daypack, unlike traditional top-loading packs.

In 1975, JanSport introduced the first convertible travel pack, as well as its signature daypack. The latter was a popular product at the bookstore at the University of Washington, where Murray McCrory (né Pletz) had been a student and met his future wife, and was originally known as the University Bookstore Rucksack. Before long, it was being sold on college campuses across the U.S. It was the precursor to JanSport's SuperBreak backpack, which The New York Times called "iconic".

In 1972, the founders began inviting their friends to join their climb on Mount Rainier to what is now known as the longest consecutive group climb. To this day, Jansport still holds the record of the most consecutive annual group climbs. In 2018, was their 46th annual Jansport Mount Rainier climb consisting of a team of 16 employees, retailers, international distributors, non-profit partners and media.

In 1986, VF purchased JanSport's then parent, Blue Bell.

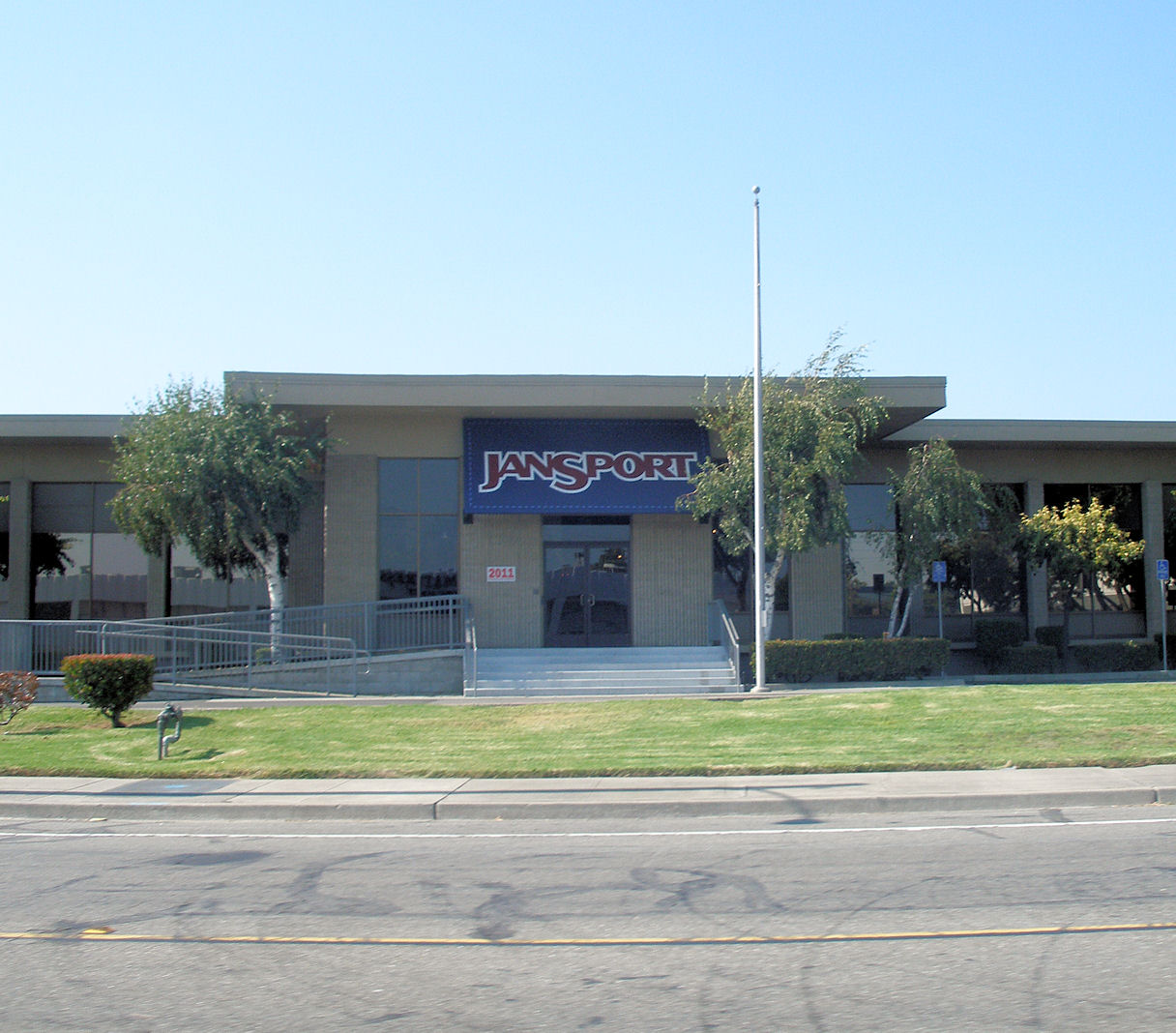
Former JanSport headquarters in Alameda, California

JanSport's corporate headquarters is in Denver, Colorado, at VF Outdoor headquarters, where it shares offices with divisional siblings The North Face, Smartwool, Altra Running, Icebreaker, and Eastpak. A distribution facility in Everett, Washington, which had opened in 1971, closed in March 2012. JanSport's collegiate apparel warehouse in Appleton, Wisconsin, closed in 2017.

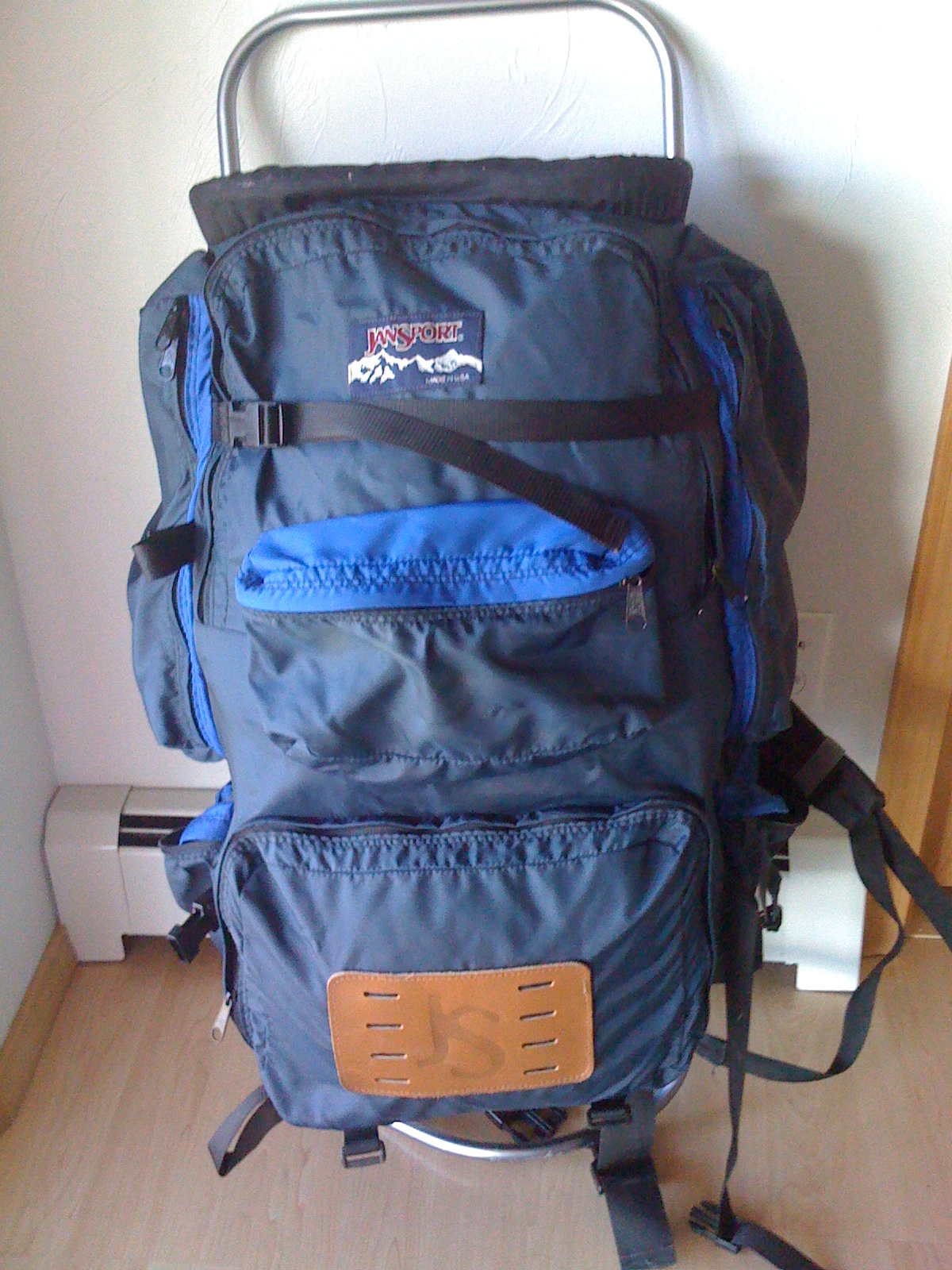
An early 1990s JanSport D-3

JanSport started by developing the external frame backpack which used a metal frame with a cloth packsack attached to it. The products made include technical day packs and internal frame backpacks. Up until the early 1990s, all JanSport packs were made in the United States.

In February 2025, JanSport partnered with L2 Brands to boost its presence in American colleges.

== In popular culture ==
On February 25, 2025, Sparks released the single "JanSport Backpack", from the album Mad!
