= VF Corporation =

American apparel company

- Formerly: Vanity Fair Mills
- Type: Public company
- Traded as: NYSE: VFC; S&P 400 component
- Industry: Apparel; Accessories
- Founded: October 1899; 127 years ago (as Reading Glove and Mitten Manufacturing Company) in Reading, Pennsylvania, U.S.
- Founder: John Barbey
- Headquarters: Denver, Colorado, U.S.
- Key people: Bracken Darrell (CEO)
- Products: Footwear and apparel (clothing)
- Revenue: ▼US$10.45 billion (2024)
- Operating income: ▼US$−34 million (2024)
- Net income: ▼US$−969 million (2024)
- Total assets: ▼US$11.61 billion (2024)
- Total equity: ▼US$1.658 billion (2024)
- Owner: Barbey family trusts (16.58%)
- Number of employees: 30,000 (2024)
- Subsidiaries: Altra Running; Eastpak; JanSport; Icebreaker; Kipling; Napapijri; The North Face; SmartWool; Timberland; Vans
- Website: vfc.com

VF Corporation (formerly Vanity Fair Mills until 1969) is an American apparel (clothing) and footwear company founded in 1899 by John Barbey and headquartered in Denver, Colorado. Its eleven brands are organized into three categories: Outdoor, Active and Work.

In 2015, the firm controlled 55% of the U.S. backpack market with the JanSport, Eastpak, Timberland, and The North Face brands.

== History ==
In October 1899 John Barbey and a group of investors established the company as Reading Glove and Mitten Manufacturing Company (or simply The Reading Glove) in Reading, Pennsylvania. Incorporated on December 4 later that year, they began with $11,000 in a 320-square-foot (30 m^{2}) factory that was leased for $60/month. Mark Hoplamazian, chairman and CEO of Hyatt Hotels Corporation, former president of the Nike brand, Trevor A. Edwards, and president and chief executive officer of The Hershey Company, Kirk Tanner, serve on the board of directors for VF Corporation.

Expanding into silk lingerie in 1913, The Reading Glove was renamed Schuylkill Silk Manufacturing, branding its lingerie line as Vanity Fair. Soon thereafter, the company was renamed Vanity Fair Mills, eventually going public in 1951.

In 1969 the H.D. Lee Company (Lee) was acquired by Vanity Fair Mills as it became VF Corporation. By 1982 VF posted profits of $15.5 million on sales of $184 million. Acquiring Blue Bell Inc. for US$762 million in 1986, VF added Wrangler, JanSport, Rustler, Jantzen, and Red Kap to its portfolio, effectively doubling its size and making it the largest publicly-held clothing company. VF became one of the two largest jeans makers in the world, taking 25% of the market.

In 1998 VF moved its headquarters from Wyomissing, Pennsylvania, to Greensboro, North Carolina, to be closer to more of its operations. Also in the 1990s, VF would acquire the Bulwark Apparel brand.

In the early 2000s VF's acquisitions included The North Face and Eastpak in 2000; and Kipling, Napapijri, and Vans in 2004. The company sold its 'Vanity Fair Intimates' lingerie business to Fruit of the Loom for US$350 million in cash on January 23, 2007. Later that month, VF acquired Eagle Creek. Also in 2007, VF acquired Majestic Athletic on February 28, followed by a $885-million purchase of 7 for all Mankind and Lucy Activewear on July 26.

Eric C. Wiseman became president, CEO, and chairman in 2008, the same year that VF would acquire Mo Industries Holdings, parent company of sportswear brands Splendid and Ella Moss.

In 2011 VF Corporation announced its intention to purchase Timberland for $2.2 billion, a deal that closed in September that year. On December 21, 2012, VF Imagewear was awarded a multimillion-dollar contract to provide uniforms and insignia for U.S. Customs and Border Protection officers. In February 2013, Imagewear was awarded a $50 million contract to manufacture uniforms for Transportation Security Administration officers.

Effective January 1, 2017, Steve Rendle became CEO and President. In 2017, VF acquired Williamson-Dickie brands, including Dickies, Workrite, Kodiak, Terra, and Walls. The next year, VF would acquire Icebreaker, complementing its Smartwool brand, as both feature merino wool in its clothing and accessories. In 2020, VF acquired streetwear brand Supreme for US$2.1 billion.

In 2021, VF announced a definitive agreement to sell a portion of its occupational work segment to a subsidiary of Redwood Capital Investments, LLC. On June 28, the sale was finalized, and the 11 divested brands became part of a new standalone company, Workwear Outfitters.

In September 2021, it was announced that the former president of emerging brands of VF Corporation, Travis Campbell, would acquire the Eagle Creek brand. In June 2023, former Logitech CEO Bracken Darrell became CEO.

In July 2024, VF announced the sale of the streetwear brand Supreme to EssilorLuxottica for US$1.5 billion. On September 15, 2025, VF agreed to sell the Dickies brand to Bluestar Alliance for US$600 million. The deal closed on November 12, 2025.

=== Spinoff ===
In August 2018, it was announced that VF would split into two separate companies. The jeans and outlet stores would be spun off as Kontoor Brands. VF kept the sports apparel and footwear businesses, and moved its corporate headquarters (and around 800 employees) to Denver, Colorado. An 11-story office building at 1551 Wewatta Street near Denver Union Station became VF's new corporate headquarters. All brands which until 2018 had maintained separate divisional headquarters (e.g., Jansport) were consolidated into VF's new Denver headquarters.

Kontoor Brands Inc. became a separate company with the stock symbol KTB in May 2019. Kontoor includes Lee, Wrangler, Rock & Republic and VF Outlets. That company had 17,000 employees.

== Brands ==
Date of acquisition or merger in parentheses.

- Altra Running (2018)
- Icebreaker (2018)
- The North Face (2000)
- Smartwool (2011)
- Timberland (2011)
- Napapijri (2004)
- Vans (2004)
- Eastpak (2000)
- JanSport (1986)
- Kipling (2004)

=== Divested brands ===
- Vanity Fair lingerie (sold in 2007 to Fruit of the Loom)
- 7 for All Mankind (sold in 2016 to Delta Galil Industries)
- Splendid (sold in 2016 to Delta Galil Industries)
- Eagle Creek (sold in 2021 to former president of emerging brands of VF Corp. Travis Campbell).
- Ella Moss (sold in 2016 to Delta Galil Industries)
- Majestic Athletic (sold in 2017 to Fanatics)
- Nautica (sold in 2018 to Authentic Brands Group)
- Bulwark Protective Apparel (sold in 2021 to Redwood Capital Investments, LLC; became part of Workwear Outfitters)
- Chef Designs (sold in 2021 to Redwood Capital Investments, LLC; became part of Workwear Outfitters)
- Horace Small (a clothing company—founded in 1937 and based in Nashville, Tennessee—that produced uniforms for law enforcement, fire, EMS, security and land management services. In 1999, the company was acquired by VF Corporation, and was renamed as The Force in 2005, but reverted to the original brand name in 2010.) In 2021, the Horace Small brand was sold to Redwood Capital Investments, LLC; and later became part of Workwear Outfitters.
- Kodiak (sold in 2021 to Redwood Capital Investments, LLC; became part of Workwear Outfitters)
- Liberty (sold in 2021 to Redwood Capital Investments, LLC; became part of Workwear Outfitters)
- Red Kap (sold in 2021 to Redwood Capital Investments, LLC; became part of Workwear Outfitters)
- Terra (sold in 2021 to Redwood Capital Investments, LLC; became part of Workwear Outfitters)
- VF Solutions (sold in 2021 to Redwood Capital Investments, LLC; became part of Workwear Outfitters and renamed Image Authority)
- Walls (sold in 2021 to Redwood Capital Investments, LLC; became part of Workwear Outfitters)
- Work Authority (sold in 2021 to Redwood Capital Investments, LLC; became part of Workwear Outfitters)
- Workrite Fire Service (sold in 2021 to Redwood Capital Investments, LLC; became part of Workwear Outfitters)
- Supreme (sold in 2024 to EssilorLuxottica)
- Dickies (sold in 2025 to Bluestar Alliance LLC)

== VF Outlet, Inc. ==
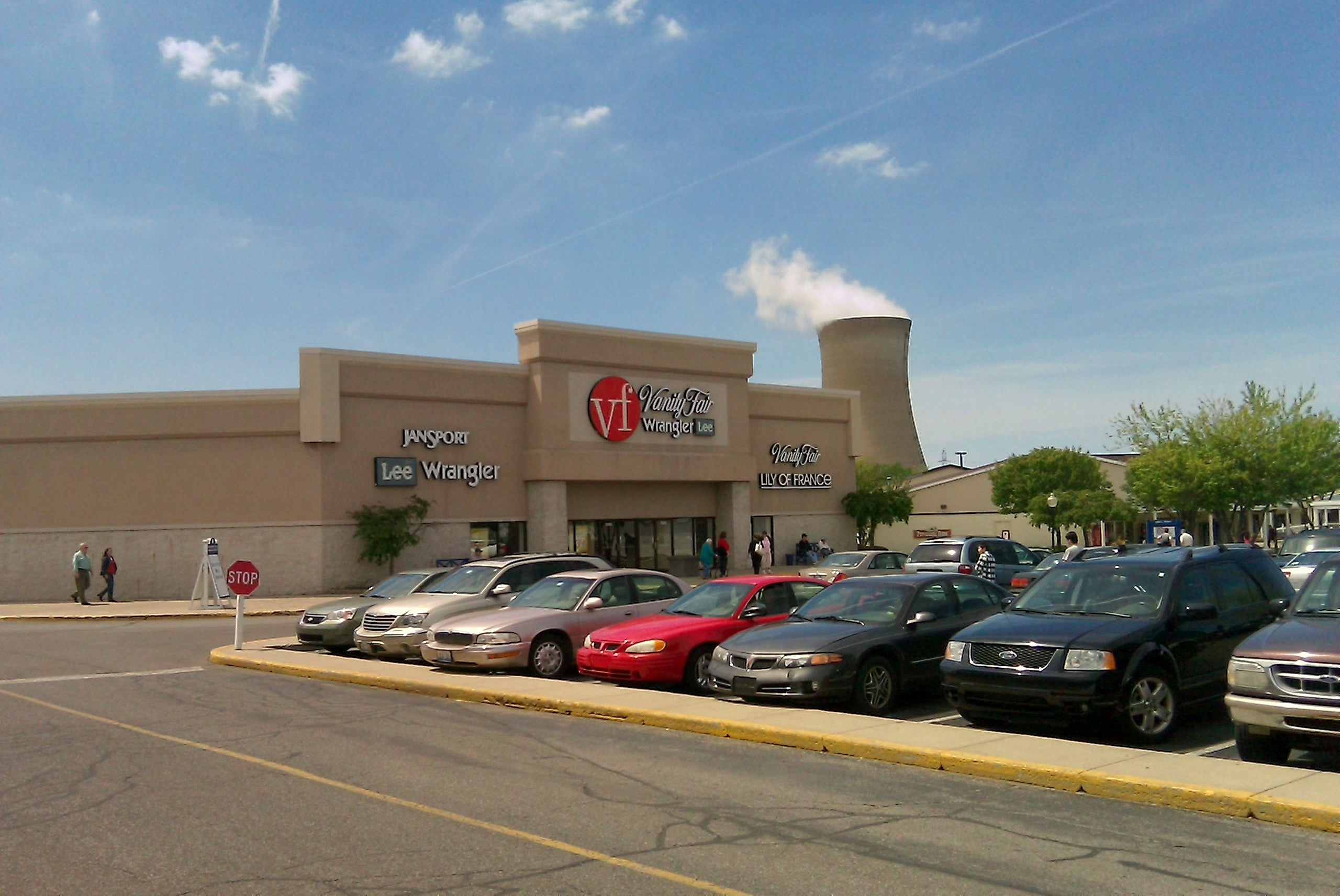
Vanity Fair Outlet, Michigan City, Indiana

In 1970 it was the suggestion of M.O. Lee, then President of VF Corporation, that established the VF Outlet business. Surplus products from VF sources including Berkshire International and Vanity Fair were sold to the public from a 5,000 square foot factory store, with only a drop cloth separating it from the company's manufacturing facility. In doing so, VF Corporation created a brand-new retail industry, the outlet mall. The first VF Outlet factory store opened in Reading, Pennsylvania. The outlet mall, located in Vanity Fair's old manufacturing mills, was dubbed the official "Outlet Capital of the World." The corporate name was changed from VF Outlet Village to VF Outlet Center in 2008. Today, the VF Outlet Center is owned and operated by VF Outlet, Inc. with over 1,000,000 square feet of retail space and more than 20 stores. The VF Outlet location in Reading, Pennsylvania, closed on December 24, 2020.

VF Outlet stores offered everyday apparel including brand name jeans, intimate apparel, activewear, and swimwear. The company as of June 2015 operated 79 stores in 31 states nationwide. As of 2025, the http://vfoutlet.com/ website redirects to the Kontoor Brands' Wrangler website with some of the former locations now operating under the Lee and Wrangler brands. The website as of 2025 no longer lists any VF Outlets. It appears that the outlets closed during the pandemic and only reopened briefly at the end of 2020 to liquidate their inventory.

In October 2013 VF Outlet launched their e-commerce store.

The VF Outlet business moved to Kontoor Brands Inc, established as a separate company in May 2019.

== Ethical sourcing ==
In 2025, VF Corporation signed a brand letter of intent calling on the Australian wool industry to end the practice of mulesing.
