= Smartwool =

American clothing company

- Company type: Subsidiary
- Industry: Clothing
- Founded: 1994; 32 years ago
- Founders: Peter Duke, Patty Duke
- Headquarters: Steamboat Springs, Colorado, U.S.
- Area served: Worldwide
- Products: Wool clothing
- Parent: VF Corporation
- Website: www.smartwool.com

Smartwool is an American clothing company. It was founded in 1994 in Steamboat Springs, Colorado, by ski instructors Peter and Patty Duke. In 2005 the Timberland Company acquired Smartwool and in 2011 Smartwool became a subsidiary of VF Corporation upon VF Corporation's acquisition of the Timberland Company.

== Overview ==
The company makes eponymous products primarily from Merino wool. Merino wool manages moisture, regulates temperature, and resists odors extremely well, making it a popular material for performance apparel. Most wool clothing, including Smartwool's, go through a treatment called Hercosett - a chlorine-based treatment invented in the 1950s by the Wool Board in the UK to make wool more commercial. This process smooths down the edges of each microscopic scale that make up the structure of a fiber. When wet, these scales interlock and stick together, clumping the fibers and then constricting when dried. At the scale of a sock or sweater this causes the entire garment to shrink. The Hercosett changes the engineering specification of the wool fibers thereby meeting the consumer need of fabric that does not shrink. Reviews for Smartwool products are typically found in the context of equipment for hiking and other outdoor activities. They offer socks, apparel and other accessories for women, men, and kids.

In 2005, Smartwool implemented the requirement that its New Zealand wool suppliers no longer practice mulesing. In 2010, Smartwool signed a contract to exclusively source its Merino wool from the New Zealand Merino Company. It also has moved to blended yarns.
