= The North Face =

American outdoor recreation products company

The North Face, Inc.

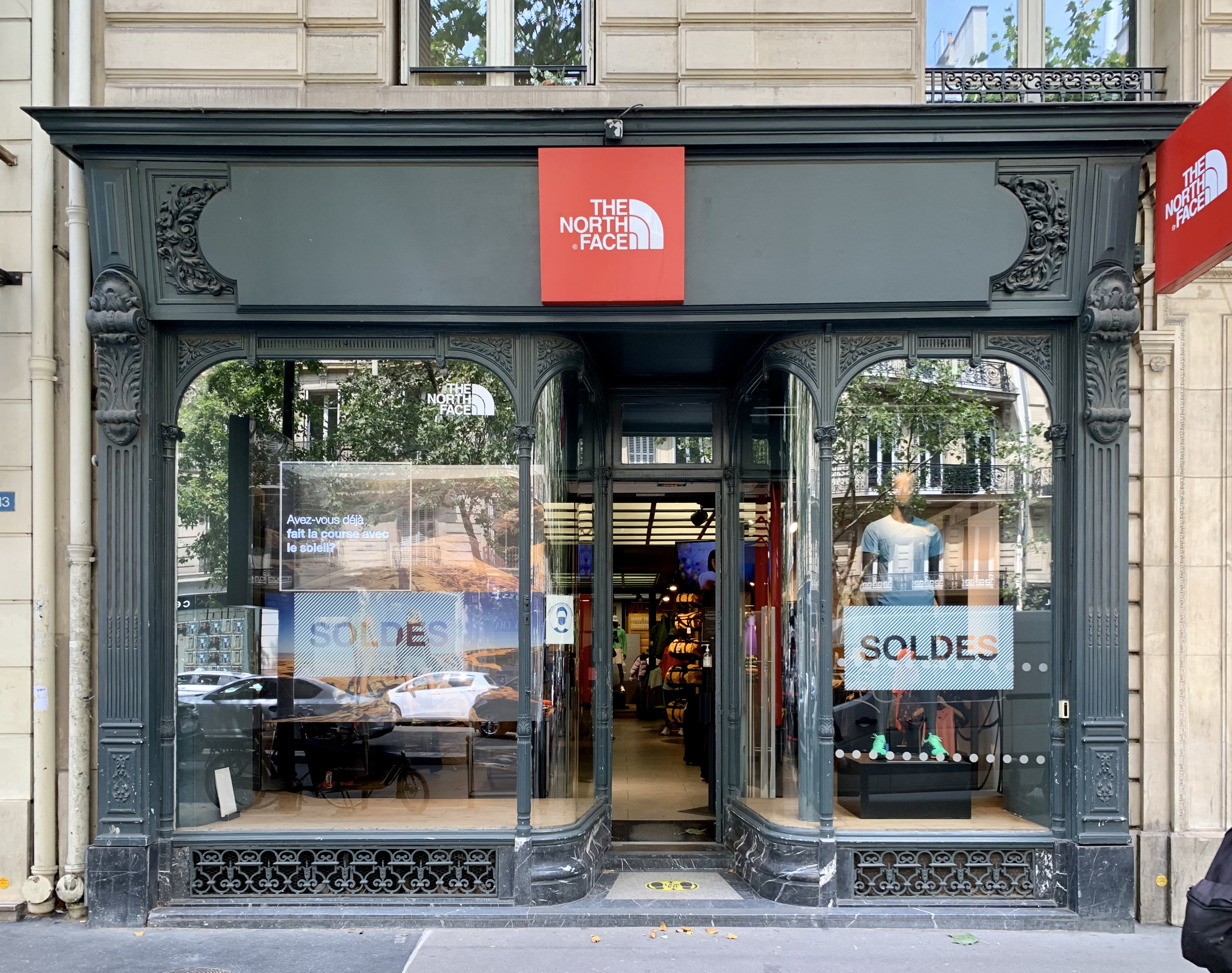
- The North Face shop in Paris, France
- Type: Subsidiary
- Industry: Retail
- Genre: Outdoor recreation clothing
- Founded: 1966 (60 years ago) in San Francisco, California, U.S.
- Founders: Douglas Tompkins; Susie Tompkins Buell
- Headquarters: Denver, Colorado, U.S.
- Area served: Worldwide
- Key people: Arne Arens (Global Brand President)
- Products: Outerwear; knitwear
- Parent: VF Corporation
- Website: thenorthface.com

The North Face is an American outdoor recreation products company. The North Face produces outdoor clothing, footwear, and related equipment. Founded in 1966 to supply climbers, the company's logo draws inspiration from Half Dome, a distinct rock formation rising over 8,700 feet (2,700 m) above sea level in Yosemite National Park. By the late 1990s, the label had expanded beyond outdoor enthusiasts by focusing on street couture and since the 2000s it has been regarded mainly as a streetwear style symbol label. In 2000, it was bought by VF Corporation.

== History ==
In 1964, Douglas Tompkins and his wife, Susie Tompkins borrowed $5,000 from a bank to found The North Face, Inc., in San Francisco, as a mail order and retail company, selling rock climbing and camping equipment. Tompkins designed tents that avoided a pole in the middle, by using bendable rods threaded through exterior sleeves instead. This widely copied design also increased the strength of the tent because the domed shape has much less wind resistance than a traditional pup tent for example.

On October 26, 1966, the first The North Face store opened at 308 Columbus Ave in San Francisco, and the band the Grateful Dead played at its grand opening.

On November 14, 1967, for "Rite of Winter", Steve Miller Blues Band and Jesse Fuller played to celebrate the opening of the second store in the Old Stanford Barn, near the Stanford Shopping Center, near Stanford University.

In 1967, Tompkins sold out his stake to Kenneth "Hap" Klopp for $50,000, and set off on a six month road trip to climb Mount FitzRoy in the wilds of Patagonia.

Tompkins joined his wife in co-founding Esprit, a fashion house. Tompkins sold The North Face with the intention of a focus on adventure film making.

In 2000, The North Face was acquired by VF Corporation in a deal worth US$25.4 million and became a wholly owned subsidiary.

In December 2008, The North Face filed a lawsuit in the United States District Court for the Eastern District of Missouri against The South Butt, its creator James A. Winkelmann Jr., and a company that handled the firm's marketing and manufacturing. In the legal action, The North Face alleged trademark infringement and sought injunctive relief. After the court ordered mediation in the case, the parties reached a closed settlement agreement on April 1, 2010; however, in October 2012, Winkelmann admitted in court that he and his father violated the settlement agreement with The North Face and agreed to pay US$65,000, an amount that will be reduced by US$1,000 for every month of compliance.

In 2019, The North Face faced consumer backlash and apologized after its marketing agency surreptitiously added photos featuring its apparel to Wikipedia articles on popular outdoor destinations.

The company was previously headquartered in Alameda, California, co-located with its corporate sibling, JanSport. In 2020, the company's headquarters relocated to Denver, Colorado. That same year, then-senior manager of global design operations Kate Tolo left to work at Kernel.

A credential stuffing attack against The North Face's website began on July 26, 2022. However, the administrators of the website discovered the "unusual activity" on August 11 and were able to stop it by August 19. The breach compromised 194,905 customer accounts.

In March 2024, The North Face began offering a 20% discount to customers who watch a four-part, one-hour "racial inclusion" course, titled the "Allyship in the Outdoors" programme which aims to "foster a deeper understanding of the unique challenges that people of colour face when accessing the outdoors". The questionnaire covers topics such as white privilege, acknowledging "lived experiences", and different types of racism. The course begins by asking the customer "How many people of color do you see on the slopes, on the hills, or on the trails?", and at the end asks the customer to become an ally to their cause. The company faced a backlash from right-wing commentators, one of whom accused the program of being "woke capitalism at its worst".

== Fashion ==
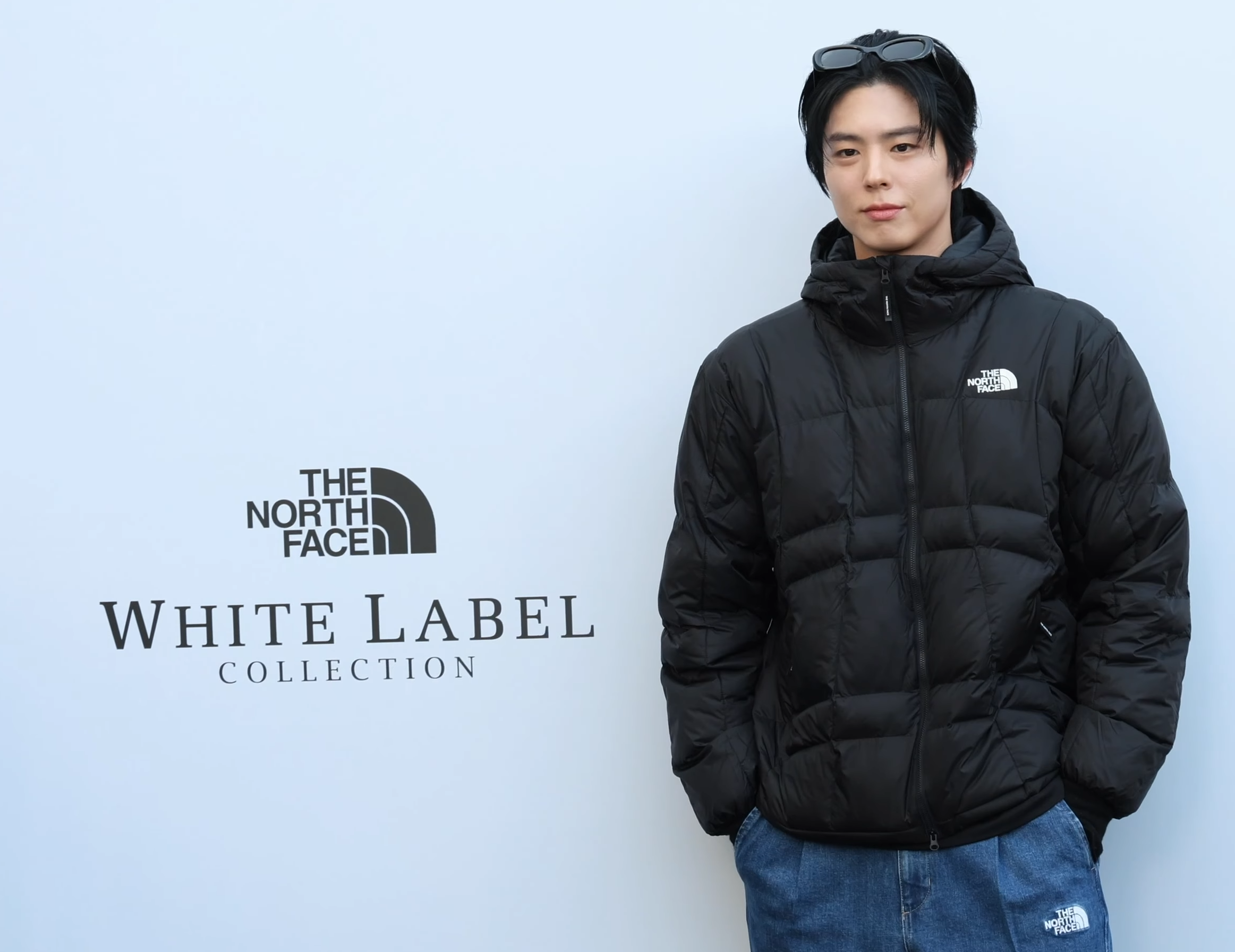
The North Face brand ambassador Park Bo-gum at a store opening in Seoul, November 2025

By 1997, purchasers of North Face attire had expanded beyond those looking for technical clothing for skiing, climbing, and other outdoor pursuits to rappers in New York City, but remained only a small part of the company's business.

In 2005, wearers of the North Face attire became the targets of robbery in Prince George's County, Maryland. A similar trend occurred in South Korea in the early 2010s where it became a status symbol, resulting in children being bullied or having their North Face apparel stolen.

== See also ==
- List of outdoor industry parent companies
