= Antje von Dewitz =

German entrepreneur (born 1972)

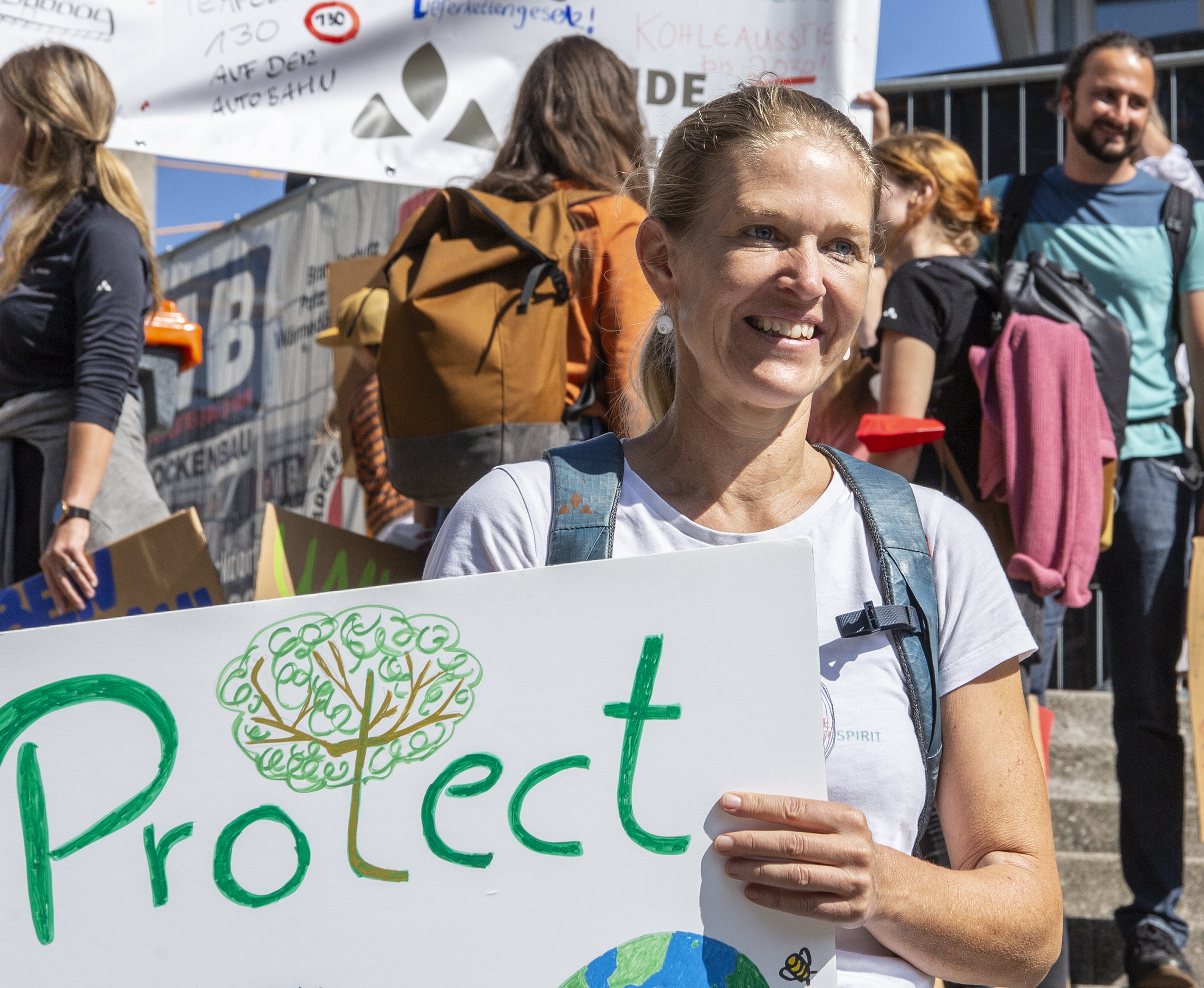
- Born: 18 September 1972 (age 54); Ebingen, Germany
- Education: University of Passau; University of Hohenheim
- Occupation: Entrepreneur
- Employer: VAUDE
- Title: Managing Director of VAUDE
- Children: 4
- Father: Albrecht von Dewitz
- Family: von Dewitz
- Awards: Order of Merit of the Federal Republic of Germany (2024); Order of Merit of Baden-Württemberg (2017)

Antje von Dewitz (born 18 September 1972 in Ebingen) is a German entrepreneur. She is the managing director of the company VAUDE, a producer of mountain sports equipment based in Tettnang.

== Family and early life ==
Von Dewitz grew up near Tettnang. She is the second of the three daughters of Albrecht von Dewitz who founded the family business VAUDE in 1974. The family is a branch of the originally Mecklenburg-Pomeranian aristocratic family von Dewitz.

Von Dewitz spent one of her final school years in Chattanooga, Tennessee, as part of an exchange program. While there, she attended Baylor School.

She lives in Tettnang with her partner and their four children.

== Studies and career ==
Von Dewitz studied languages, economics and cultural studies at the University of Passau where she graduated in 1998. Between 2002 and 2005, she was also employed as a research assistant at the University of Stuttgart-Hohenheim, where she wrote a dissertation titled High-performance employment relationships in medium-sized companies. She completed her doctorate in 2005.

During her studies, von Dewitz wanted to work in the field of environmental protection and had initially not planned to enter her father's company. When she first joined VAUDE in 1998, she built up the Bags and Travel Luggage division. From 2000 to 2002, she was responsible for public relations, and in 2005 she took over the entire marketing management. In 2009, Albrecht von Dewitz handed over the management to her.

Since then, von Dewitz has increasingly set up the company's processes in line with sustainability and environmental responsibility. This includes the value chain, such as product logistics and international suppliers. Under her leadership, the company has expanded the use of recycled and natural materials and added environmental and social standards in its operations. As a result, production at the company's Tettnang site has been carbon-neutral since 2012.

Von Dewitz was an Alliance 90/The Greens delegate to the Federal Convention for the purpose of electing the President of Germany in 2017.

Von Dewitz has published opinion pieces in magazines such as Manager Magazin, and in 2020 she published the book Mut steht uns gut!.

== Economic and political positions ==
=== Supply chain legislation ===
Von Dewitz calls for binding statutory rules requiring compliance with environmental and social standards in supply chains. In 2020, she campaigned for the adoption of the German Supply Chain Due Diligence Act, and in 2024 for the EU supply chain directive. At the end of 2025, von Dewitz criticised the planned changes to the Corporate Sustainability Due Diligence Directive (CSDDD). She argued that these would weaken core sustainability principles and send a negative signal, as companies that had implemented such measures early would be disadvantaged, while those that had so far taken no action would be favoured.

=== Economy for the Common Good ===
Von Dewitz advocates that the guidelines for the Economy for the Common Good should be given more importance and criticises that in business only financial indicators are taken into account. Together with Christian Felber, she contributed to the European Economic and Social Committee taking a position in 2015 in favour of the Economy for the Common Good model and recommending that it be integrated into both European and national legal frameworks.

=== Textile production ===
Von Dewitz has been involved in industry-wide initiatives to improve environmental and social standards in textile production. She was involved in the development of the state-run textile label Grüner Knopf (Green Button), introduced in 2019, which sets minimum social and environmental standards in textile production. In this context she took part in a public discussion event with the then Federal Development Minister Gerd Müller in 2020.

=== Rights for refugees in employment ===
In early 2018, Antje von Dewitz, together with the brewery owner Gottfried Härle, founded the initiative Bleiberecht durch Arbeit (Right of Residence through employement), which was joined by more than 150 businesses and associations from Baden-Württemberg. The business initiative called for a right of residence for rejected asylum seekers, provided they can demonstrate a job or apprenticeship. She also called for the swift introduction of an immigration law, arguing that companies such as VAUDE faced a shortage of workers in certain areas that could be met by recruiting from abroad.

== Other activities ==
=== Former ===
- Naturkapital Deutschland (project of the Helmholtz Centre for Environmental Research), Member of the Project Advisory Board
- Member of the Board of the European Outdoor Group
- German Federal Foundation for the Environment (DBU), Member of the Board of Trustees
- Landesbank Baden-Württemberg (LBBW), Member of the Advisory Board

=== Active ===
- since 2017: Albrecht von Dewitz Foundation, Chair of the Board of Trustees
- since 2021: Member of the Executive Board of the Federal Association for Sustainable Business

== Recognition (selection) ==
- 2026 – K5 Köpfe Award in the category Sustainability & Impact
- 2026 – Transformation Leader Award, ESG Transformation Awards
- 2026 – Goldene Blume von Rheydt
- 2024 – Order of Merit of the Federal Republic of Germany
- 2023 – Female All-Star Board in the Chief Executive Officer category
- 2021 – Chief Marketing Officer of the Year
- 2021 – business award Ernst & Young Entrepreneur of the Year in the category of sustainability
- 2021 – Role Model Award from the StartUp Teens education platform in the category family businesses
- 2021 – GEM Award for sustainable brand management from the Gesellschaft zur Erforschung des Markenwesens (Society for Research into Branding)
- 2018 – Brand Manager of the Year, German Brand Award
- 2017 – Order of Merit of Baden-Württemberg
- 2017 – Handelsblatt Hall of Fame of Family Businesses
- 2012 – B.A.U.M. Environmental Award
- 2011 – Top Business Women 2011 in the category Top Entrepreneur of Financial Times Germany
- 2011 – Economic Medal of the State of Baden-Württemberg

== Publications and guest contributions (selection) ==
- Nachhaltigkeit funktioniert nicht als Top-down-Projekt. Initiative Verantwortung. Issue 1, 2026.
- Warum es Zeit für eine Kreislaufwirtschaft in der Textilbranche ist. Manager Magazin. 4 July 2023.
- Jetzt handeln – für unsere Zukunft und unsere Kinder. Forbes. 28 April 2022.
- Wertschöpfung durch Verantwortung und Haltung. In: Alexander Herzner and René Schmidpeter (eds.): CSR in Süddeutschland. Unternehmerischer Erfolg und Nachhaltigkeit im Einklang. Wiesbaden 2022, pp. 243–253.
- Mut steht uns gut! Nachhaltig, menschlich, fair – mit Haltung zum Erfolg. Benevento, Salzburg/Munich 2020, ISBN 978-3-7109-0072-3.
- Die Gestaltung eines leistungsstarken Arbeitsverhältnisses durch „Talent Relationship Management“. Ein praxisorientiertes Konzept für mittelständische Unternehmen. PhD thesis, University of Hohenheim, 426 pages, Shaker Verlag, Aachen 2006, ISBN 978-3-8322-5048-5.
