= VAUDE =

Sports equipment company since 1974

Vaude Sport GmbH & Co. KG
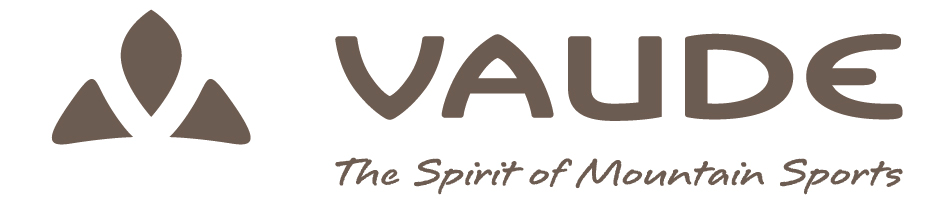
- Type: GmbH & Co. KG
- Industry: Mountaineering equipment, sporting goods, outdoor clothing, camping equipment, bike apparel
- Founded: 1974
- Founder: Albrecht von Dewitz
- Headquarters: Tettnang, Germany
- Key people: Antje von Dewitz (CEO)
- Products: Outdoor apparel, backpacks, tents, sleeping bags
- Number of employees: 1600
- Website: www.vaude.com

VAUDE (German: [fau'de]) is a German producer of mountain sports equipment. The head office is in Tettnang, Germany. It was founded in 1974 by Albrecht von Dewitz and is fully family owned. In 2009, the management was handed over to his daughter Antje von Dewitz. VAUDE is certified under the EU's EMAS environmental management standard.

Products include tents, backpacks, and sleeping bags. There are 486 employees working in the head office in Germany. The corporate group also owns production facilities in Bỉm Sơn, Vietnam.

In 2006, Edelrid became a part of the Vaude Group. The brands Lucky (climbing supplies) and Markill (camping stoves) were integrated in the Edelrid brand in 2008. Markill was originally a brand of the company Marsteller & Killman founded in Thuringia in 1866 and established in Kettwig in 1907. Marsteller & Killman produced stoves, cooking utensils, food containers, and aluminum bottles. In 2017, the Vaude Group took over Red Chili, a producer mainly of climbing shoes and other climbing garments. Red Chili is now part of Edelrid.

VAUDE is the official outfitter of the climbing association German Alpine Club since 2002.

== History ==
VAUDE was founded in 1974 by Albrecht von Dewitz. The name derives from his initials. In 2009, leadership of the company was passed to his daughter, Antje von Dewitz.

== Corporate social responsibility and environmental protection ==
In 2014, VAUDE published its first corporate responsibility report established in accordance with the guidelines of the Global Reporting Initiative. Since 2010, the company is a member of the Fair Wear Foundation, an organisation which is seeking to improve working conditions in the textile industry. To ensure a manufacturing process which is as environmentally friendly and safe as possible, VAUDE applies the bluesign production standard. The company headquarter in Tettnang is climate neutral.

In 2015, VAUDE was one of six companies nominated for the Financial Times' Boldness in Business Award in the category Corporate Responsibility/Environment. At the end of the year, VAUDE has won the first place in the category Germany's Most Sustainable Brand of the German Sustainability Award.

Regional activities include the running of the company-owned creche for about 30 children, and the take over of the local public swimming pool, to save it from being closed.

VAUDE recommends and is a reseller of Nikwax detergents and waterproofing products which are environmentally friendly because they are water-based, solvent-free and fluorocarbon-free (without the GHS09: Environmental hazard symbol).

Largely adhering to the Economy for the Common Good, VAUDE publishes an additional balance sheet based on its criteria.

In 2019, VAUDE was among the first batch of companies to obtain the newly created Green Button which is an official certificate bestowed by the German government to indicate high ecological and social standards.

The company is a supporter of the foundation Development and Climate Alliance which helps companies and other organisations in becoming climate neutral. The company has achieved complete climate neutrality at the beginning of 2022.

VAUDE applies a company-wide environmental management system that is audited by EMAS, the European Union's Eco-Management and Audit Scheme. As part of its climate goals, VAUDE has committed to achieving Net Zero emissions by 2040 under the Science Based Targets initiative.

=== VAUDE Academy ===
The VAUDE Academy for sustainable business offers consulting services to companies that want to become more sustainable or develop a sustainable business. During the first two years of its existence, the Academy is being supported by the German Federal Environmental Foundation.

=== Support for refugee employees ===
Vaude is one of the founding companies of the association Bleiberecht durch Arbeit (Right of Residence through Work), established in 2018, which promotes the granting of right of residence for refugees with permanent employment contract. Due to the scarcity of skilled labour, Vaude would suffer considerable economic damage had their refugee employees to return to their countries of origin. Numerous companies face the same problems and thus joined the association.

== Gallery ==
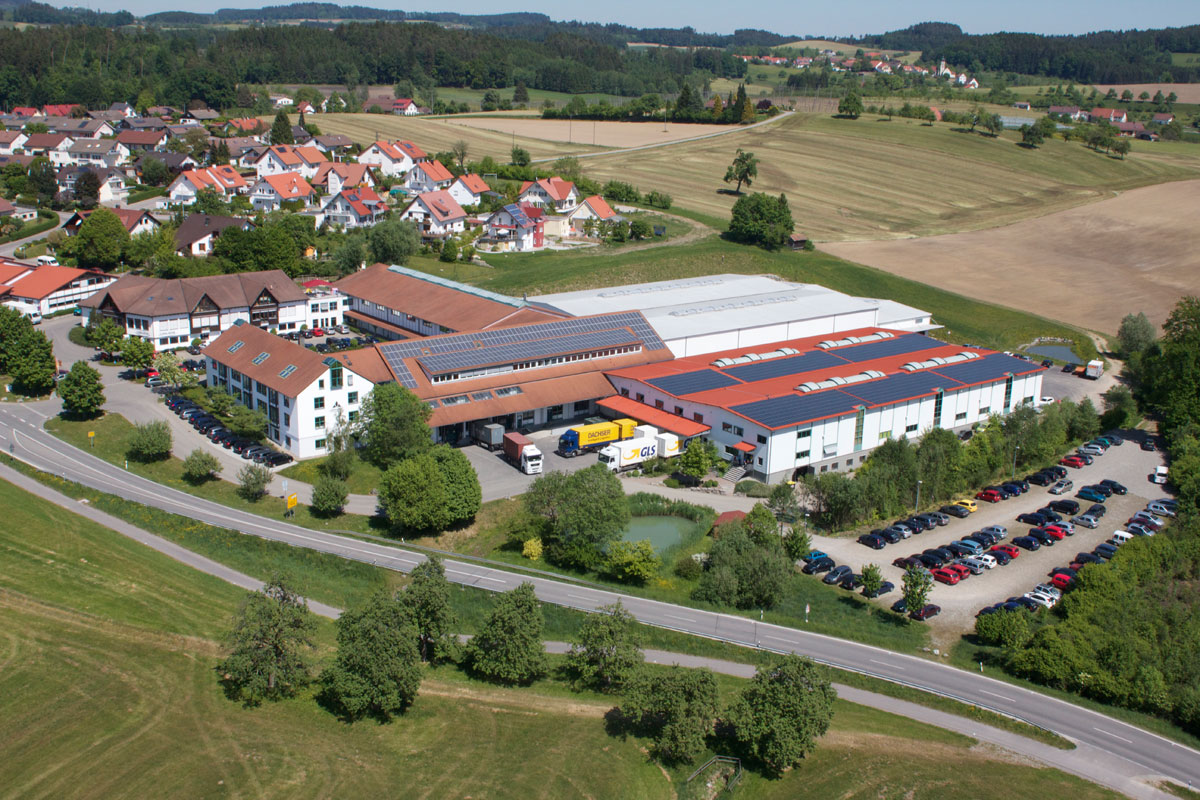
Headquarters in 2013

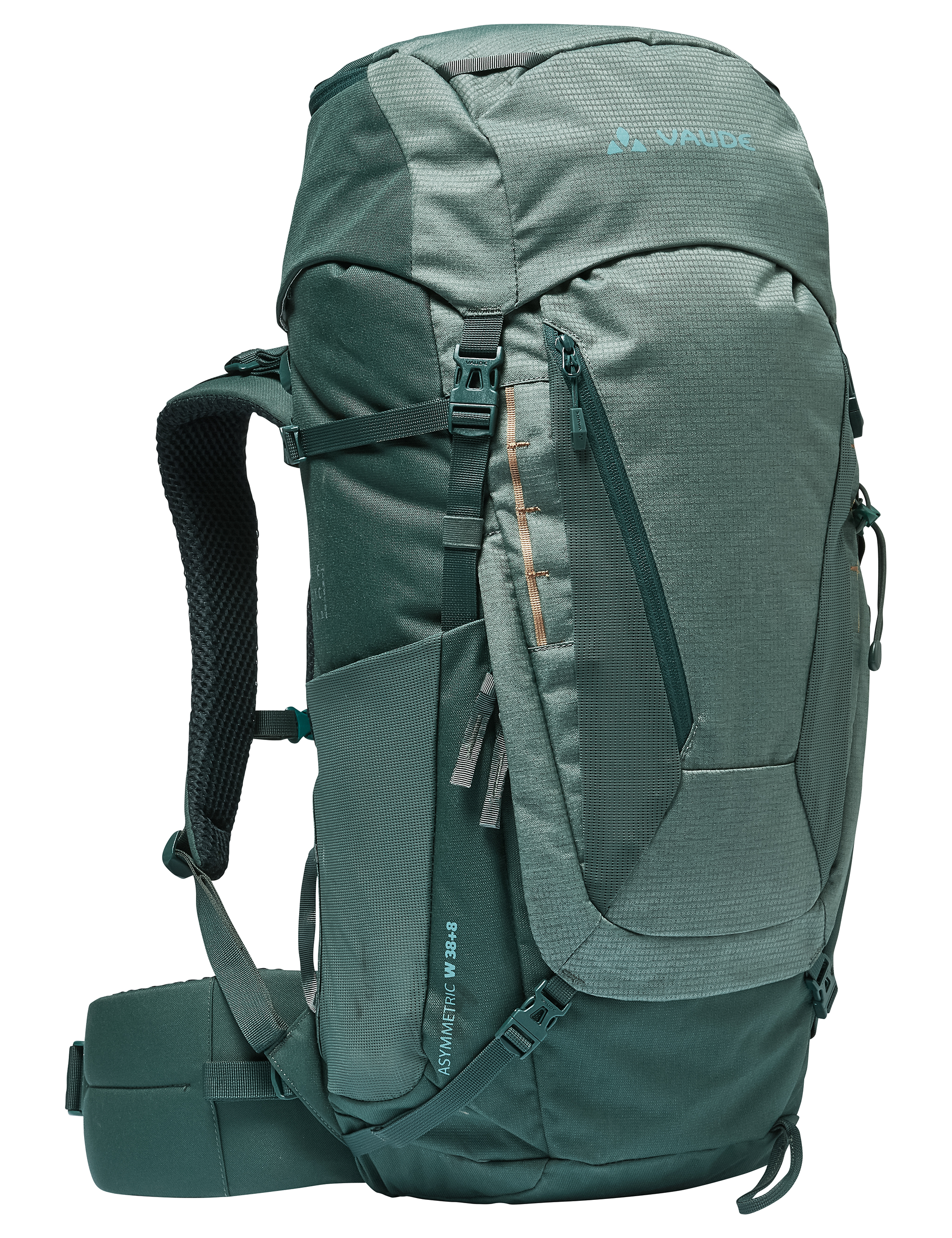
VAUDE Asymmetric backpack

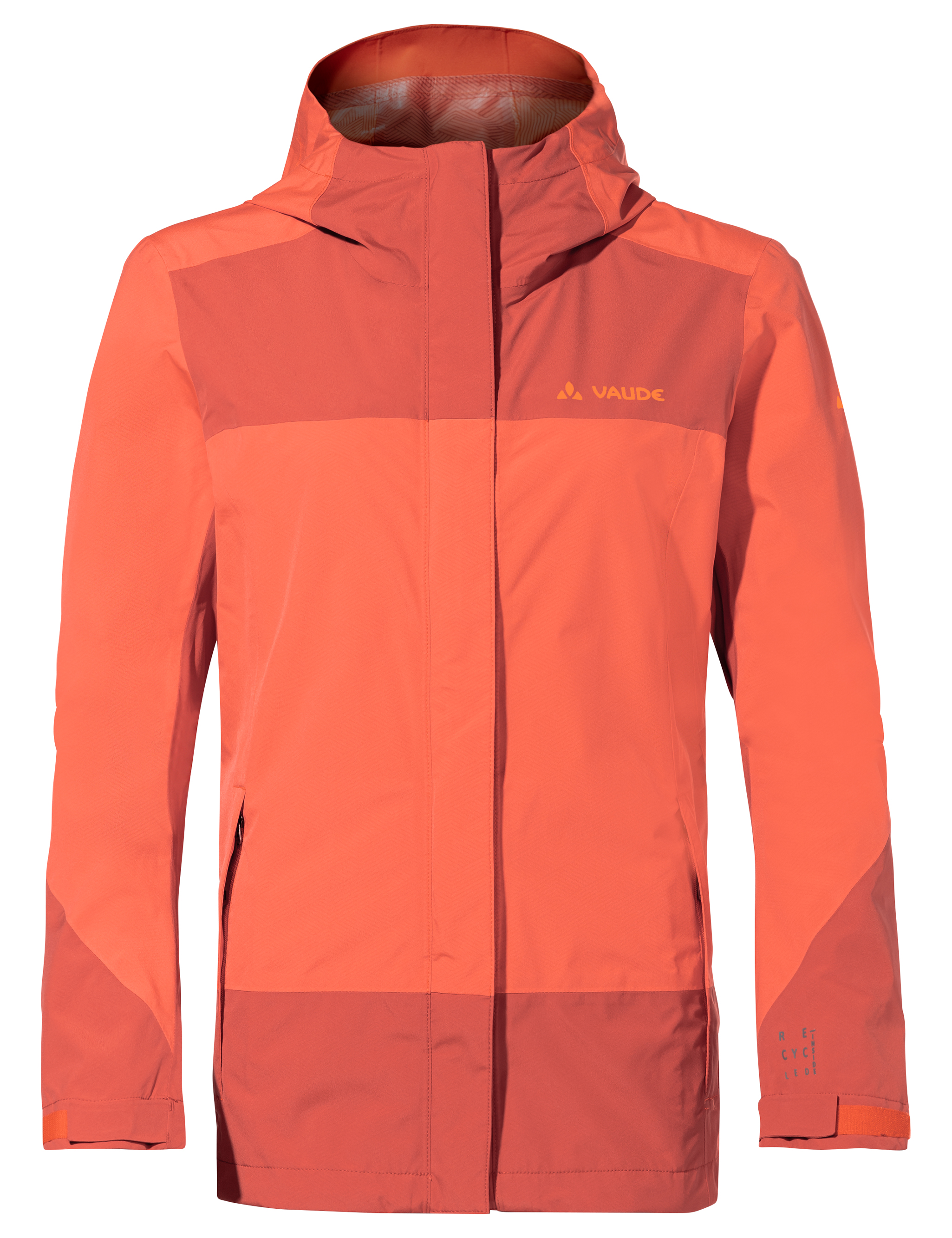
VAUDE Neyland Jacket

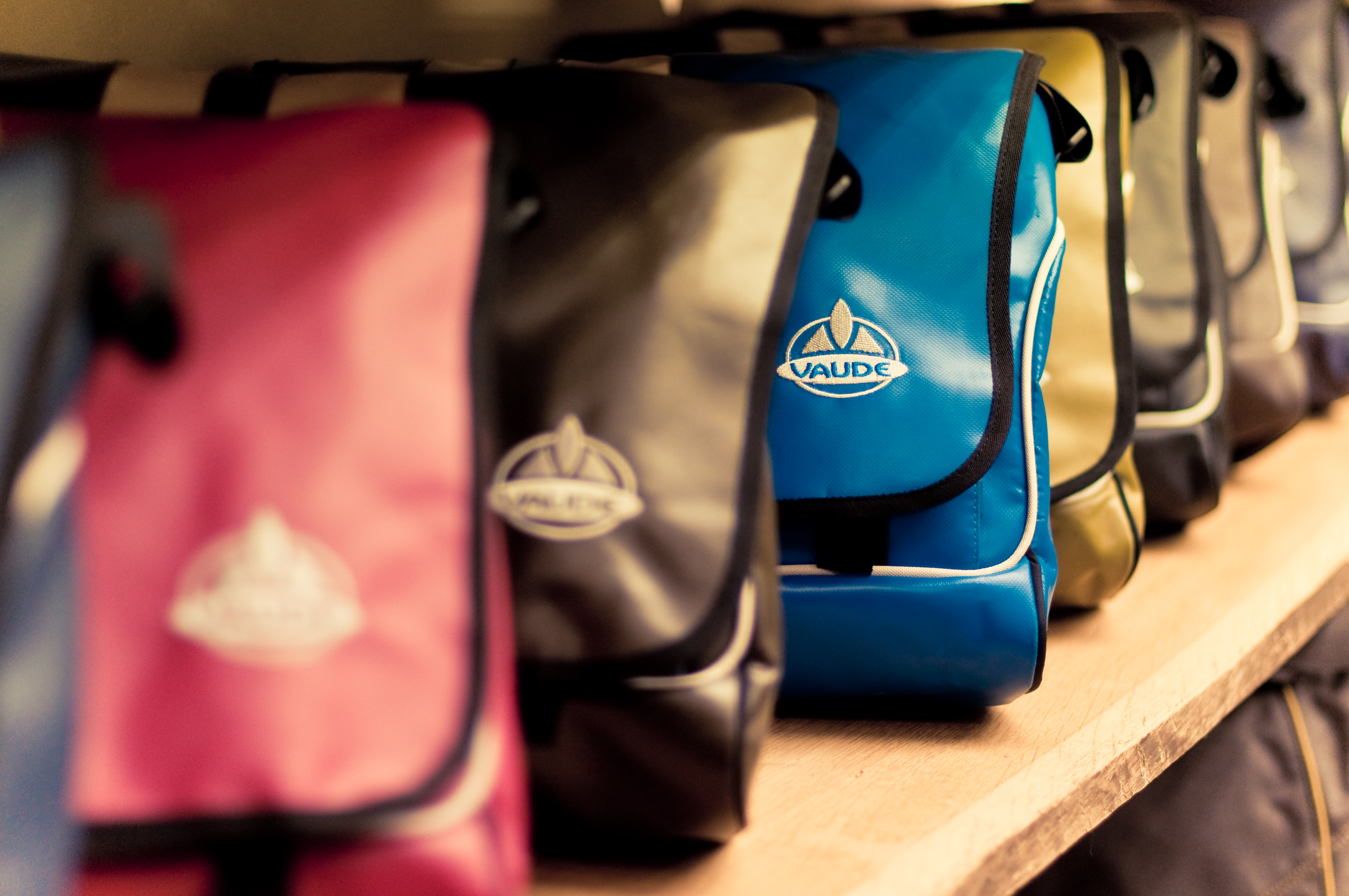
Bags by VAUDE from 2009

== VAUDE-sponsored athletes (past and present) ==
VAUDE-sponsored teams, athletes and events include:

- since 2021: Team TREK|VAUDE as mountainbike team
- in 2021: BANFF Mountain film festival world tour
- Aline Bock (freeride snowboarder)
- Team Colnago (cycle sport), including Eva Lechner
- Team Centurion VAUDE (cycle sport)
- Angela Eiter (climbing world cup champion)
- Kilian Fischhuber (bouldering world cup champion)
