= Degersee =

Lake in Germany

Coordinates: 47°36′N 9°38′E

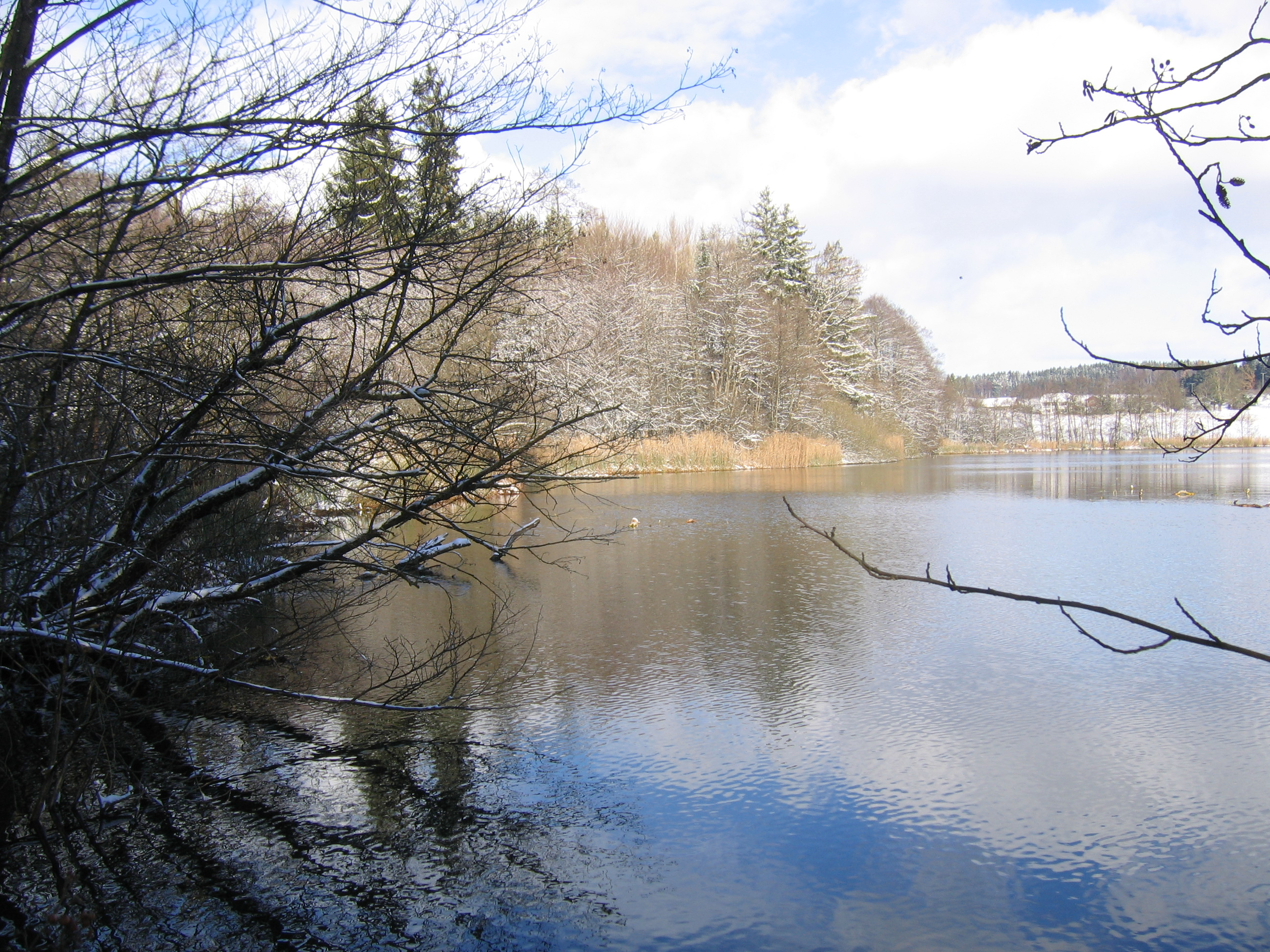
Degersee in November.

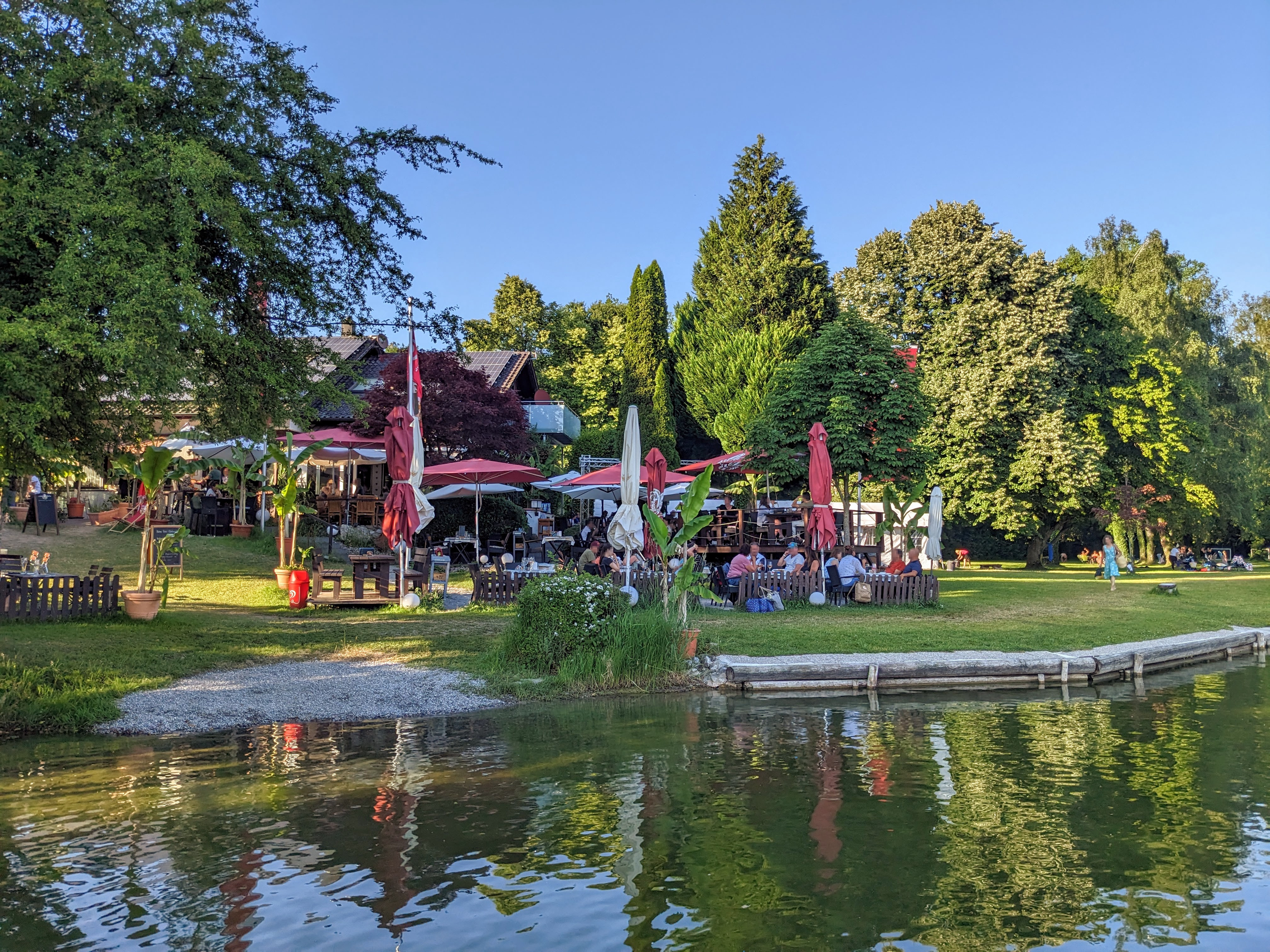
The Degerseestube on the shore of the Degersee.

The Degersee is a small lake in the hilly hinterland a few kilometers north of Lake Constance in the German state of Baden-Württemberg. The lake is partially surrounded by forest, relatively warm in summer, often freezes over completely in winter, and has two swimming areas. The lake is popular with swimmers and fisherfolk.

== Location and size ==
Most of the Degersee is part of the territory of the city of Tettnang. A small area in the southeast belongs to the Bavarian city of Lindau (Bodensee). The lake is at an altitude of 478.2 meters and has a surface area of approx. 30 hectares. Its shore length is about 2,730 meters and it has an average depth of about six meters, with a maximum of eleven meters. Its volume is about 1,828 million cubic meters.

== Origins ==
Like the nearby Schlein lake, the Wieland pond, and Muttel lake, Lake Deger was formed with meltwater towards the end of the last ice age. The surface tributaries are insignificant, the water exchange taking place mainly through an intensive groundwater flow. Via the pond near Hörbolzmühle and the Nonnenbach, Lake Degersee drains into Lake Constance and is thus part of the Rhine River system.

== Biology ==
The Degersee is in a landscape conservation area. The surrounding agricultural land (90% grassland, 7% special crops, 3% arable land) is mainly used for livestock grazing which, due to the sloping nature of the regional farmland, leads to considerable eutrophication (nutrient input). Extensification measures, which are already influencing Lake Schlein, are also intended to reduce the eutrophication level of Lake Deger. Both lakes are part of the Program for the Rehabilitation of Upper Swabian Lakes.

=== Flora ===
In the protected area of the Degersee, the White Water Lily (Nymphaea alba) is prevalent, along with the floating leaf plants Yellow Pond Rose (Nuphar lutea) and Marsh Iris (Iris pseudacorus, also called yellow iris).

=== Fauna ===
Lake Deger is stocked with zander, pike, catfish, carp, and the European eel. There are also minor populations of roach, bream, perch, tench, crucian carp, and bleak. Numerous dragonfly and bird species can be observed in the shore area.

== Neolithic settlement ==
Archaeological explorations have revealed the presence of an early complete village of 150-200 people in Lake Degersee lying about three meters below the lake bottom. Numerous artifacts have been found, including axes cut from hard stone and a six-meter dugout canoe. Numerous stone utensils from the Lake Garda region point to trade links with Upper Italy. A chance find in 2002 put archaeologists on the trail of this village.
