= Salinerito =

Salinerito is an colective Ecuadorian brand that represents cooperative companies from Salinas de Guaranda, a little village in the Andes mountains of Bolívar province. Salinerito is perhaps best known for its aged cheeses and chocolates but also sells dried mushrooms, dehydrated fruits, nougats, jam, sheep and alpaca wool textiles, and yarn. The products are sold in Ecuador at local grocery stores and exported to several countries as United States, Japan or Italy.

Salinerito brand is known for its solidarity economy practices: The profits are used to reinvest in the company and for social development.

The legal owner of the brand is "Gruppo Salinas" Corporation, the umbrella organization that represents the common objetives of the people of Salinas and its seven member institutions. Gruppo Salinas is a member of the WFTO.

== Gruppo Salinas ==
Gruppo Salinas Corporation handles the marketing of Salinerito brand as well as the sale of its products; to this end, it operate two specialized departments: the domestic sales division and the export center.

Gruppo Salinas Corporation gather seven organisations which are:

- COOPSALINAS (Cooperativa de Ahorro y Crédito Salinas): legally constituted in November 16, 1972 as a saving and credit cooperative, it was the basis for the creation of the following organizations.
- PRODUCOOP (Cooperativa de Producción Agropecuaria El Salinerito): this cooperative is in charge of the milky derivatives production. It produces more than 15 varieties of cheese, among wich Andean cheese, mozzarela and fine-herb cheese stand out.
- TEXAL ASSOCIATION (Social Development Association of Artisans): It was established in 1974, and its most notable current activities are training for female artisans, a savings fund for members, and the production and export of handicrafts.
- FUGJS ("Grupo Juvenil" foundation): this organization was founded by young people from the community in 1976. Its main activity is dehydrating edible mushrooms for local sale and export. The also manage a hostel for tourists.
- FFSS (Salesian Family Foundation): This organization manages chocolate production and other small-scale activities. It uses the profits to fund social projects, promote education, and support Catholic charitable works.
- FUNORSAL (Foundation for the peasant organizations of Salinas): lt is a long-standing organization in Salinas that manages three production activities: the production of cured meats, the production of sheep's wool yarn, and a community store. It uses the profits to fund training and technical assitance programs in the small communities of Salinas.
- FUNCONQUERUCOM (Fundación Consorcio de Queseras Rurales Comunitarias), This organization is responsible for distributing Salinas cheeses and other products| into Ecuador.
