= Tettnang (disambiguation) =

Tettnang may refer to:

- Tettnang, a city in Germany
- Tettnang, the codename for Red Hat's Fedora Core 2 Linux distribution (final), released on May 18, 2004.
