= Caroline Woolard =

American artist and organizer (born 1984)

Caroline Woolard (born 1984) is an American artist and organizer, whose work explores intersections between art and the solidarity economy. She primarily works collaboratively and collectively and was a founding member of Trade School, OurGoods, BFAMFAPhD and the New York City Real Estate Investment Cooperative. Woolard previously worked as an Assistant Professor of Sculpture at the University of Hartford and a mentor at the School of Visual Arts. She is now working for Open Collective and Open Collective Foundation.

== Early life and education ==
Woolard was born in Providence, Rhode Island. She earned a BFA degree in 2006 from Cooper Union, which at the time was a tuition-free art school in New York City.

== Career and work ==
Woolard's work explores solidarity economics, collaboration, barter, labor, and other forms of monetary and non-monetary exchange. She makes sculptural objects that facilitate communication and also co-creates systems of sharing and exchange. Woolard says that she became involved with social practice art not because she was against commercial or institutional art, but instead because she believes the art world is too isolated. Woolard hopes to promote interdependence between artists.

Our Goods (founded in 2008) is an online platform for resource sharing within the creative community. Our Goods received numerous awards, including support from the Rockefeller Cultural innovation Fund (2012-2014), the Economic Revitalization for Performing Arts grant from The Field (2009-2012), and a prominent space in Creative Time’s exhibition, Living as Form (2011). In 2016 the independent platform shut down and moved on to Facebook.

Trade School (founded in 2009) is an online platform that allows people to propose and sign up for classes which are paid for using barter. Trade School chapters popped up in over 50 cities internationally. Woolard feels that broadening art classes to those who would not traditionally be able to afford them will expand the world of art for the better. As of 2018 there are 26 schools still linked on the website.

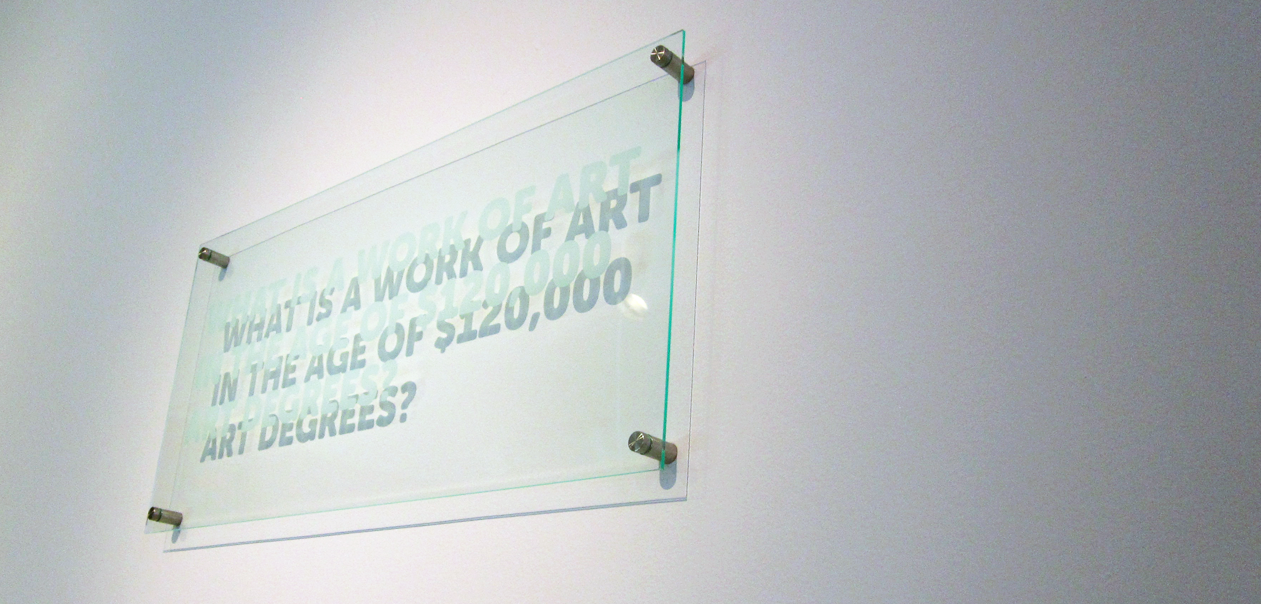
What is a Work of Art in the Age of $120,000 Art Degrees? from Statements by Caroline Woolard (2014)

BFAMFAPhD (a mashed together acronym of BFA, MFA and PhD, founded 2014) is a research and advocacy project that uses US Census data to illuminate the ever-rising cost of getting a college art degree and its dubious relevance to the ability to make a living as an artist. In addition to these economic concerns, Woolard and the other collaborators highlight problems of ethnic, racial and gender diversity in the art world.

The New York City Real Estate Investment Cooperative (founded 2015 with lawyer/organizer Paula Segal and others) aims to collectively buy and maintain permanently affordable space in New York for civic, cultural, and cooperative use.

Other works of art that Woolard has created are public seating, urban campsites and swings for subways. In 2009, Woolard curated a "newspaper exhibition" which highlighted the many economic issues facing workers in the arts. Woolard's Exchange Café was presented at the Museum of Modern Art as part of the Department of Education’s Artists Experiment initiative (2013).

=== Awards ===
- Arts and Social Justice Fellow, Judson Church, New York (2015)
- Woolard's work has been supported by a fellowship at Eyebeam, residencies at the Queens Museum, MacDowell Colony, Watermill, and Lower Manhattan Cultural Council, a grant from the Rockefeller Foundation's NYC Cultural Innovation Fund.
