= Corporate Sustainability Due Diligence Directive =

Law in the European Union on human rights

Directive 2024/1760
- European Union directive
- Text with EEA relevance
- Title: Directive (EU) 2024/1760 of the European Parliament and of the Council of 13 June 2024 on corporate sustainability due diligence and amending Directive (EU) 2019/1937 and Regulation (EU) 2023/2859
- Made by: European Parliament and the Council
- Journal reference: OJ L, 2024/1760, 5.7.2024

The Corporate Sustainability Due Diligence Directive 2024 (2024/1760) is a directive in European Union (EU) law to require due diligence for companies to prevent adverse human rights and environmental impacts in the company's own operations and across their value chains. It was adopted in 2024.

== Provisions ==
CSDDD establishes a framework of due diligence for companies to identify actual or potential risks and harm to human rights and the environment as well as establishing processes and standards to diminish these risks. The directive will apply to a company's "chain of activities", as well as operations across the company's subsidiaries both inside and outside of Europe. The purpose of the directive is to improve the regulatory framework on human rights and sustainability due diligence, which will aid in the EU's transition to a climate-neutral and green economy. Additionally, CSDDD will establish consistency across different directives in the European Union.

In accordance with its final adopted text (Directive 2024/1760), the directive is anchored in Articles 50 and 114 of the TFEU. It transitions sustainability from voluntary corporate social responsibility to a mandatory legal obligation, operationalizing the UN Guiding Principles on Business and Human Rights. A key provision requires large companies to adopt a "Transition Plan" ensuring their business models are compatible with the 1.5°C global warming limit. Furthermore, it introduces a robust civil liability regime, granting victims the legal right to seek full compensation for damages in European courts if a company fails to comply with its due diligence obligations.

=== Companies in scope ===
EU Companies with a global net turnover of over 450 Mio from the previous year with over 1000 employees are included.

For non-EU companies, companies with an EU-exclusive net turnover of 450 Mio are affected.

In both cases, Art 37 foresees a stepwise implementation of the CSDDD, starting with companies of over 1.5 Billion Euro net turnover for the previous year until 26.07.2027 (and over 6000 employees for EU-companies) and 900 Mio Euro turnover for one year until 26.07.2028.

Small and medium-sized enterprises (SMEs) and micro-enterprises are not concerned by the proposed rules. However, the proposal provides supporting measures for SMEs, which could be indirectly affected.

=== Enforcement ===
The rules of directors' duties are enforced through existing Member States' laws. The rules on corporate sustainability due diligence will be enforced through administrative supervision. European Union member states will each designate an authority to supervise and enforce the directive, including fines and compliance orders. The European Union will set up a European Network of Supervisory Authorities that will bring together representatives of the member states to ensure a coordinated approach. Member states will ensure that victims get compensation for damages resulting from the failure to comply.

== History ==
The CSDDD was proposed by the European Commission on 23 February 2022. On 1 December 2022, the Council of the EU adopted its own approach to the written proposal. On 1 June 2023, the European Parliament adopted the CSDDD as a draft that would be negotiated for the rest of the year.

Initially, the legal implementation of the directive failed in a vote in the Council on 28 February 2024, as the required majority of at least 15 EU member states, which together represent at least 65% of the EU population, was not achieved. The Belgian Council Presidency then announced that it would examine whether the concerns of the Member States could be allayed in consultation with the European Parliament. After further negotiations, the EU member states agreed on a substantially weakened version of the directive on 15 March 2024, which now received a qualified majority. Germany, which has the Supply Chain Act, abstained due to its internal blocking stance of the small party in the governing coalition, the economic liberal FDP. However, Italy was convinced by the changes, resulting in a majority without approval of the then-incumbent Scholz cabinet.

On 24 May 2024, the Council of the EU adopted the directive. It will be incorporated into domestic laws within two years by all European Union member states.

In November 2024, the European Commission announced plans to merge the Corporate Sustainability Reporting Directive (CSRD), Corporate Sustainability Due Diligence Directive (CSDDD), and the EU Taxonomy into a single regulation. This initiative aims to streamline sustainability reporting and reduce administrative burdens on businesses. The proposal is currently under consideration by the European Parliament and EU member states.

In May 2025, Qatar threatened to halt LNG deliveries to Europe if the European Union continued with proposed regulations linking trade to human rights and environmental standards.

In November 2025, the European Parliament reformed the law with support from right-wing, conservative, and Christian democratic political parties. This reform aimed to reduce the administrative burden on business while maintaining environmental and human rights standards.
