= Solidarity economy =

Model of organization emphasizing cooperation and social health over profit

Solidarity economy or social and solidarity economy (SSE) refers to a wide range of economic activities that aim to prioritize social profitability instead of purely financial profits. A key feature that distinguishes solidarity economy entities from private and public enterprises is the participatory and democratic nature of governance in decision-making processes as one of the main principles of the SSE sector. Active participation of all people involved in decision-making procedures contributes to their empowerment as active political subjects. However, different SSE organizational structures reflect variations in democratic governance and inclusive participation. Ultimately, SSE represents a crucial tool in guaranteeing that social justice ideals are upheld and that the wellbeing of the most vulnerable populations is paid attention to during the planning processes.

== Overview ==
Some refer to solidarity economy as a method for naming and conceptualizing transformative monetary qualities, practices, and foundations that exist throughout the world. These incorporate, yet are not constrained to, egalitarian and participatory monetary conduct by people, laborers, and makers, for example, by a person who is a moral shopper, specialist, and additionally financial specialist, or by a specialist co-op, reasonable exchange business, or dynamic association. It is an economic formation which seeks to improve the quality of life of a region or community on the basis of solidarity, often through local business and not-for-profit endeavors. It mainly consists of activities organized to address and transform exploitation under capitalist economics and the large-corporation, large-shareholder-dominated economy and can include diverse activities. For some, it refers to a set of strategies and a struggle aimed at the abolition of capitalism and the social relations that it supports and encourages; for others, it names strategies for "humanizing" the capitalist economy—seeking to supplement capitalist globalization with community-based "social safety nets".

Historically, classical utilitarians argued that individuals should adopt a system which maximizes the total of all individuals' utility. When the utilities of people are summed, the personal utilities become equivalent. In other words, one's personal utility is equivalent to the utility of others. Individuals can then comprehend how other people feel, forming the foundation of the solidarity economy. Solidarity might be more effective than alienated individuality in certain instances. Game theory can explain greater productivity via solidarity. Sometimes in game theory contexts, cooperative instances might lead to a larger benefit, however game theory fundamentally presupposes the selfish nature of individuals. A major distinction between solidarity and game theory is that solidarity economy places and recognizes the selfless component of humans above their egotistical features.

== History ==
"Solidarity economy" was used as an economic organizing concept as early as 1937, when Felipe Alaiz advocated for the development of economic solidarity among worker collectives in urban and rural areas during the Spanish Civil War. It emerged more widely as a term in Latin America over the past twenty years in response to community and worker demands to expand forms of social inclusion and unity. Different conceptions of Solidarity Economy originated among movements seeking to create grassroots economies during the military dictatorships that dominated Latin America during the 1970s and 1980s and subsequently, flourished as of the emergence of financial neoliberal democracies in the 1990s up to the present.

The term "Social Solidarity Economy" started to be used in the late 90s. The first meeting of what would thereafter become the RIPESS (Intercontinental network for the promotion of social solidarity economy) network, took place in Lima, Peru on July 4, 1997 and the participants from more than 30 countries agreed that there needed to be a strong integration between the more traditional social economy structures (collective enterprises – a sector of the solidarity economy) and the more holistic and alternative approaches of solidarity economy practices and communities. The notion of solidarity economy has gained popularity, particularly since the early 2000s. In fact, while in most francophone and hispanophone countries the expression used is "Social AND Solidarity Economy", when the RIPESS network was formally announced in December 2002, it chose to eliminate the "AND" in its official name, in order to stress solidarity economy's aim of transformative system change, which includes going beyond the social economy. Another global network with the same aims, the Alliance for a Responsible, Plural and United World, produced an enhanced definition: "Production, distribution and consumption activities which contribute to the democratisation of the economy via citizen engagement at the local and global level. Many networks continue to use the term Solidarity Economy and institutions usually refer to SSE as Social and Solidarity Economy.

According to previous revolutionary trends, we could be in the midst of a historical shift away from marketism and towards solidarity.

== Solidarity-based economic approaches ==
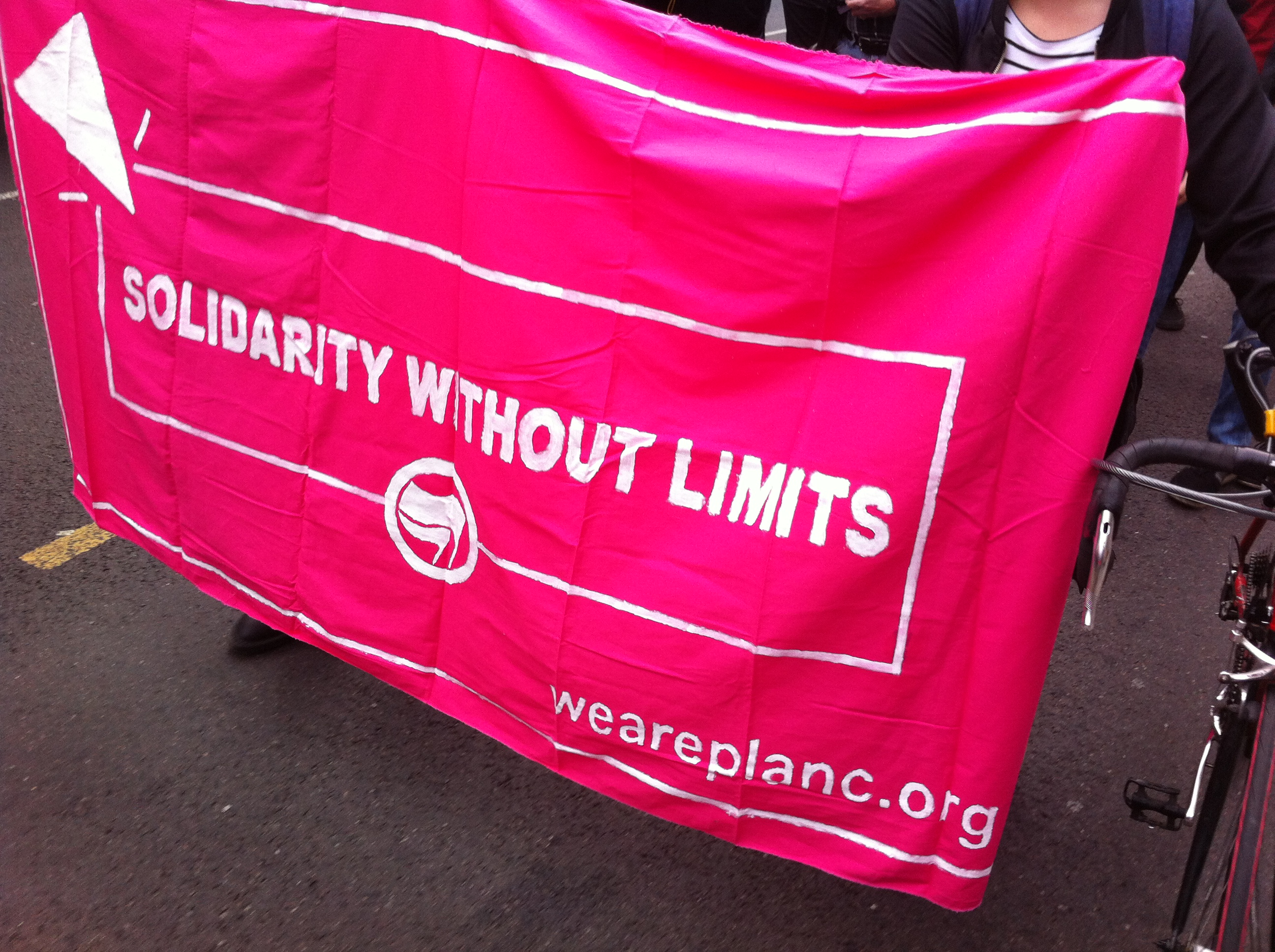
Protest for the poor with banner reading "solidarity without limits"

One SSE approach focuses primarily on making the current economic system sustainable. Its objective is the creation of enterprises that serve its members or the community, instead of simply striving for financial profit by prioritising people and work over capital in the distribution of revenue and surplus. Human, financial, and environmental assets are just a few instances of the variables that influence a company's sustainability. This notion, which is relevant to SSE enterprises, is integrated into social systems like social accountability and social balance.United Nations Research Institute for Social Development has concluded that "social and solidarity economy, a science-in-the-making, cannot go very far in framing discourses and in engaging with the bigger picture, as an alternative to the crisesridden "dominant economic paradigm"" and calls for further developing SSE into a new scientific theory with its own foundations which would offer an alternative to the homo economicus. Environmental development, furthermore known as sustainable development, is a type of economic and social advancement that ensures living standards within the ecosystem and therefore is tailored to the needs of each sustained region in order to become both humanistic and sustainable throughout time.

Another approach in this regard could be the "Bill on the Hook" project of the Istanbul Metropolitan Municipality. The initiative primarily aimed to provide much-needed financial support for the citizens of Istanbul during the COVID-19 pandemic. The platform anonymously matches the donors with households that have outstanding utility bills. In just 31 hours, the campaign generated over 1 million USD (18,600,000 TL) and helped 57,423 people in Istanbul pay their water and gas bills. "Bill on the Hook" is still keeping its popularity, mainly because a large number of households are still unable to pay their utility bills on time due to the current hyperinflation environment in Turkey.

Specialized literature includes the following variables as contributing elements to the sustainability of entrepreneurship in the SSE:

- Social factors. It is vital to acknowledge that belief systems should have solid grounds and also acknowledge the possible risk that particular designations may cause as to understand how social psychology contributes to the sociological growth and organizational strength.
- Politics, religion, and culture. Within each historical and cultural heritage, it is important to ensure factors such as cultural legacy, ancient traditions, as well as the implementation of awareness, while also keeping a sense of community and identity.
- Associativity. Associativity is a component of competition which enables the implementation of organisational structures that enable decision-making procedures centered on sustainability through time.
- Education. Consequently, functionality of SSE will rely on the input of the involved stakeholders, on the learning programs that are tailored to the experience, literacy, and educational backgrounds of their staff.
- Models of intervention in sustainable development. Models should not be uniform processes; rather, these should be created and implemented as part of collaborative initiatives under participatory operations.

== Core values and principles ==
The RIPESS Charter of the Intercontinental Network for the Promotion of Social Solidarity Economy sets out eleven core values to promote the ethical and value-based economic model:

1. Humanism – putting human beings, their dignity, culture and full development at the centre
2. Democracy – promoting democratic values
3. Solidarity – mobilizing resources and establishing relations with other social collectives
4. Inclusiveness – establishing dialogue based on the respect for ideological differences
5. Subsidiarity – promoting grassroots development to overcome common problems
6. Diversity – encouraging representation of players of all sectors of society
7. Creativity – promoting innovation that contribute to social change
8. Sustainable Development – respecting the balance of the ecosystem by protecting the environment and biodiversity
9. Equality, equity and justice for all - fighting against all forms of discrimination and oppression
10. Respecting the integration of countries and people - opposing economic, political, and cultural domination of the North over the South
11. A plural and solidarity-based economy - providing an alternative to the neoliberal economic model by taking actions towards a plural and solidarity-based economy

Also, sharing some of the above-mentioned points, six principles have been described in the REAS Charter for Solidarity Economy:

1. Principle of equity. Introduces an ethical or justice principle in equality. It is a value that recognizes all people as subjects of equal dignity and protects their right not to be subjected to relationships based on domination regardless of their social condition, gender, age, ethnicity, origin, ability, etc. Society must satisfy, in an equitable manner, the respective interests of all people.
2. Principle of work. Work is a key element in the quality of life of people, community and economic relations between citizens and states. Importance of recovering the human, social, political, economic and cultural dimension of work that allows the development of people's capacities. Work is much more than a job or an occupation.
3. Principle of environmental sustainability. All productive and economic activity is related to nature. The good relationship with nature is a source of economic wealth and health. Therefore, environmental sustainability must be integrated into all activities, evaluating the environmental impact (ecological footprint).
4. Principle of cooperation. Cooperation instead of competition. Model of society based on harmonious local development and fair commercial relationships. Solidarity Economy is based on participatory and democratic ethics, which wants to promote learning and cooperative work between people and organizations.
5. Principle of non-profit-making. The economic model to be pursued is aimed at the integral, collective and individual development of people, and as a means, the efficient management of economically viable, sustainable and profitable projects, whose benefits are reinvested and redistributed. This "non-profit-making" is closely linked to the way of measuring results, which take into account not only the economic aspects, but also the human, social, environmental, cultural and participatory aspects; and the final result is the comprehensive benefit.
6. Principle of territorial responsibility. Participation in the sustainable local and community development of the territory. Organizations fully integrated into the territory and social environment in which they carry out their activities, which requires involvement in networks and cooperation with other organizations of the nearby social and economic fabric, within the same geographical area. This collaboration is a way for concrete positive and solidary experiences to transform the structures that generate inequality, domination and exclusion.

== Regional context ==
=== South Asia and Sub-Saharan Africa ===
Solidarity economy initiatives in South Asia and Sub-Saharan Africa take diverse forms, rooted in long-established traditions of cooperation, collective action, and community-based finance. Across South Asia, particularly in India, Bangladesh, and Nepal, cooperatives and women-led self-help groups (SHGs) are among the most prominent SSE structures. These groups play central roles in rural development, income generation, and financial inclusion, especially for women.

India's Self-Employed Women's Association (SEWA) represents a well-documented example of union–cooperative collaboration, combining collective bargaining with cooperative enterprise to support informal women workers.

Microfinance is also a major component of the SSE landscape in the region; models such as the Grameen system in Bangladesh and group-lending SHGs in India and Nepal have expanded credit access but demonstrate mixed outcomes. While microfinance can improve women's income, mobility, and social participation, several studies highlight risks of overindebtedness, stress, and uneven benefits between socioeconomic groups. Informal savings and rotating credit mechanisms also exist, though they remain less extensively documented compared to African contexts.

In Sub-Saharan Africa, the solidarity economy is strongly shaped by long-established informal mutual aid institutions. Rotating savings and credit associations (ROSCAs), including susu and njangi groups in Cameroon, provide essential credit access, mutual insurance, and social support for low-income households. Cooperatives and community enterprises are equally significant, particularly in agriculture and traditional markets, where they enhance livelihoods, promote local economic development, and support community resilience.

Traditional food markets, often dominated by women, function as important SSE spaces that integrate economic activity with social support systems, though they frequently face challenges linked to informality, infrastructure, and governance.

Despite their importance, SSE initiatives in Sub-Saharan Africa are constrained by limited state support, policy misalignment, and low levels of social protection coverage for informal workers. NGOs often substitute or complement government action, contributing to development, training, and sustainability of SSE organisations.

Across both regions, several challenges consistently emerge, including tension between informality and formalisation, risks of overindebtedness, uneven empowerment outcomes, and persistent gender inequalities.

Research gaps include limited gender-disaggregated data, scarce long-term analysis, and insufficient attention to integrating informal workers into formal social protection systems.

== Challenges of a solidarity economy ==
Market relation pressures – As Solidarity Economy enterprises expand, it often becomes more immersed in market relations and global value chains, making it confront new pressures that force large SSE organizations to adopt practices that are characteristic of for-profit enterprise and dilute core SSE principles. An example of such a case could be the growing criticism of microcredit practices.

Informal economy vulnerability – Solidarity Economy interacts with the informal economy of atomized workers and producers a complex web of social relations. The challenge lies in transitioning out of this informality, transforming a wide array of informal social relations with multiple actors into governance and adopting necessary regulations.

Internal dynamics – Solidarity Economy organizations can be prone to elite capture and social exclusion. This might be because of the types of producers that integrate organizations such as cooperatives and/or due to the fact that those with better education and skills end up dominating governance structures.

Balancing multiple objectives – Solidarity Economy enterprises are required to balance a variety of potential objectives related to efficiency and equity, or economic, environmental, social and emancipatory dimensions. This could be made additionally difficult by the organization's membership homogeneity, misalignment of incentives between managers and members, increased reliance on external support etc.

These initiatives' variety and fragmentation – For the social economy stakeholders/ institutions and their associated monetary sponsors, this is regarded as a regular difficulty. Certain strategies appear to be appropriate, whereas others seem to be less effective for the social economy, due to its increased heterogeneity of initiatives.

== Social economy businesses ==
Social economy businesses (SEB) are situated at the overlap of the social economy and the private sector. This kind of hybrid organisations earn all or some part of their income from the marketplace and they may be in competition with private sector organisations. As many businesses that are primarily viewed as part of a private sector have modified their business imperatives and taken on social business models, it can sometimes be difficult to distinguish between private sector and social economy businesses. The main difference with private sector organisations is that SEB are guided by social objectives that are reflected in their business mission and strategies and built into their structure. In other words, in case of SEB the prerogatives of capital do not dominate over the social objectives in the organization's decision making.

== Impact and measurement ==
Research on the social and solidarity economy (SSE) highlights a growing range of approaches to assessing its economic and social impacts. Studies show that SSE organisations contribute to employment creation, income generation, and local development, and often demonstrate greater resilience and social inclusion than conventional enterprises. Examples include cooperatives in Ghana that facilitate access to productive resources and support social inclusion, and SSE organisations in Spain that promote equitable income distribution and stronger employment outcomes for people with disabilities.

SSE initiatives are also linked to progress on the Sustainable Development Goals (SDGs), particularly in relation to locally grounded development, sustainable entrepreneurship, and climate adaptation.

However, measuring macroeconomic contributions such as productivity or GDP share remains difficult due to the hybrid, community-oriented nature of SSE activities.

A wide range of social impact evaluation frameworks are used to assess SSE performance, including the capability approach, social return on investment (SROI), theory of change, social utility frameworks, co-production, and participatory action research.

Recent studies emphasize participatory and context-specific methods, as well as feminist and transformative frameworks for capturing gendered impacts.

Scholars critique conventional metrics such as GDP, job counts, and microfinance repayment rates for failing to capture SSE's multidimensional aims. Alternatives include multidimensional and territorially grounded indicators reflecting social inclusion, democratic governance, and community well-being.

Methodological challenges persist, including informality, lack of standardised data, attribution difficulties, and insufficient gender- or time-disaggregated evidence.

== Examples of organizations ==
The term social and solidarity economy alludes to a wide scope of organizations that are recognized from ordinary revenue driven venture, business and casual economy by two center highlights. To start with, they have unequivocal monetary and social (and frequently ecological) goals. Second, they include differing types of co-employable, affiliated and solidarity relations. They include the following examples:

- Fair trade organizations form part of the solidarity economy, as their aim is to express practical solidarity with farmers in the developing world by paying them fair prices for their produce.
- Self-help organizations also form part of the solidarity economy as members support each other in dealing with their problems as a practical form of solidarity.
- Co-operatives and especially worker cooperatives form part of the solidarity economy if their aims include a commitment to solidarity in some form.
- Trade unions are often considered a key part of the solidarity economy as they are based on the principle of solidarity between workers.
- Tenants unions provide advocacy and support for the rights of tenants in rental housing.
- Free software movement, open-source development, and other forms of commons-based peer production
- Social center
- Give-away shops and other forms of gift economy
- Local exchange trading systems (LETS) as a way of replacing money.
- Solidarity lending
- Ethical purchasing
- Economy for the Common Good
- Global Social Economy Forum
- Trade School, a participatory art project co-founded by Caroline Woolard, where participants barter materials, ideas, and services for knowledge.
- Solidarity Economy Networks, such as the U.S. Solidarity Economy Network (USSEN), co-founded by Julie Matthaei (professor of economics with a focus on feminist economics and the political economy of gender, race and class at Wellesley College)

== Case studies ==
Several peer-reviewed studies document concrete examples of Social and Solidarity Economy (SSE) initiatives across different regions, illustrating how these organisations operate in practice and the types of social, economic, and environmental impacts they generate.

Community-led initiatives in the United Kingdom, Portugal, Brazil, and Senegal demonstrate how SSE organisations strengthen local governance, promote sustainable livelihoods, and support Sustainable Development Goals through commons-based and cooperative approaches.

Complementary and local currencies such as Local Exchange Trading Systems (LETS), timebanks, and community currencies like the Bristol Pound have been examined as tools to support local economic circulation and community cohesion.

Shared-equity housing models such as community land trusts (CLTs) and limited-equity cooperatives (LECs) stabilise housing for low-income households while maintaining long-term affordability.

During the COVID-19 pandemic, mutual aid food networks emerged as significant SSE practices. A case study from Tompkins County, New York, describes outdoor food cabinets and community refrigerators supporting food-insecure households.

Worker and social cooperatives also represent key SSE case studies. In Italy, Type B work-integration social cooperatives employ people with disabilities, migrants, and marginalised groups.

During the pandemic, Italian and Bulgarian cooperatives redistributed food, produced protective equipment, and supported hospitals.

In Hungary, work-integration cooperatives employing Roma community members and long-term unemployed workers created local employment while navigating unstable market and policy conditions.

== See also ==
- Criticism of capitalism
- Gift economy
- History of the Co-operative Movement
- Mutual aid (organization theory)
- Socialist economics
