= Economy for the Common Good =

Social movement for an alternative economic model

- Founded: October 6, 2010
- Founded at: Wien, Austria
- Type: Voluntary association
- Location: international
- Members: 11,000
- Website: www.econgood.org

Economy for the Common Good (ECG) is a global social movement that advocates an alternative economic model, which is beneficial to people, the planet and future generations. The common good economy puts the common good, cooperation and community in the foreground. Human dignity, solidarity, ecological sustainability, social justice and democratic participation are also described as values of the common good economy. The movement behind the model started off in Austria, Germany and South Tyrol (a German-speaking region in Italy) in 2010 and quickly spread to many countries throughout the EU. It now has active groups in Africa, Latin America, North America and Asia. As of 2021, the movement consists of over 11,000 supporters, 180 local chapters and 35 associations.

Christian Felber coined the term "Gemeinwohl-Ökonomie" (Economy for the Common Good) in a best-selling book, published in 2010. According to Felber, it makes much more sense for companies to create a so-called "common good balance sheet" than a financial balance sheet. The common good balance sheet is a value-based measurement tool and reporting method for businesses, individuals, communities, and institutions, which shows the extent to which a company abides by values like human dignity, solidarity and economic sustainability.

More than 2,000 organizations, mainly companies, but also schools, universities, municipalities, and cities, support the concept of the Economy for the Common Good. A few hundred have used the Common Good Balance sheet as a means to do their “non-financial” reporting. These include Sparda-Bank Munich, the Rhomberg Group and Vaude Outdoor. Worldwide nearly 60 municipalities are actively involved in spreading the idea.

The ECG movement sees itself in a historical tradition from Aristotle to Adam Smith and refers to the fundamental values of democratic constitutions.

== Overview ==
The model has five underlying goals:

1. Reuniting the economy with the fundamental values guiding society in general. Encouraging business decisions that promote human rights, justice, and sustainability.
2. Transitioning to an economic system that defines serving the “common good” as its principal goal. The business community and all other economic actors should live up to the universal values set down in constitutions across the globe. These include dignity, social justice, sustainability, and democracy. These do not include profit maximization and market domination.
3. Shifting to a business system that measures success according to the values outlined above. A business is successful and reaps the benefits of its success not when it makes more and more profits, but when it does its best to serve the public good.
4. Setting the cornerstones of the legal framework for the economy democratically, in processes which result in concrete recommendations for reforming and reevaluating national constitutions and international treaties.
5. Closing the gaps between feeling and thinking, technology and nature, economy and ethics, science and spirituality.

The Economy for the Common Good calls for reevaluating economic relations by, for example, putting limits on financial speculation and encouraging companies to produce socially-responsible products.

== Common Good Balance Sheet ==
The common good balance sheet is an assessment procedure for private individuals, communities, companies and institutions to check the extent to which they serve the common good. Ecological, social and other aspects are assessed. The procedure is part of the common good economy and was developed by Christian Felber. In conventional balance sheets, only economic value categories such as profit are taken into account, whereas the common good balance sheet allows reporting on value to society and environment, for example.

Common good balance sheets should be easy for everyone to understand; companies should be able to make their common good performance transparent on a single page. In doing so, companies can decide whether to prepare the balance sheet on their own, assess each other in a "peer-group", or appoint an independent auditor. This distinguishes the common good balance sheet from conventional sustainability reports, which are prepared by the companies themselves. The balancing process for small companies is relatively cheap (1,000 Euros).

To date, around 250 companies in the German-speaking world prepare their balance sheets according to Gemeinwohl guidelines, in Europe there are 350–400 companies (as of early 2016). In total, there are 590 German, 631 Austrian, 67 Swiss and 70 South Tyrolean companies that have registered as supporters of Gemeinwohl-Bilanz. All peer-group and externally audited Gemeinwohl-Bilanzen are publicly available.

According to proponents of the movement, the success of a company should not be determined by how much profit it makes, but rather by the degree to which it contributes to the common good. Companies receive more points in this balance sheet when, for example, employees are satisfied with their jobs or when the top managers do not receive exorbitantly more than the lowest paid worker.

== See also ==
- Benefit corporation
- Common good
- Commons
- Commonwealth
- Economic justice
- Gross National Happiness
- Gross National Well-being
- Happiness economics
- Humanistic economics
- Participatory economics
- Solidarity economy
- Sparda-Bank Munich - participant in the Common Good Balance Sheet Program
- Welfare economics
