= Supply Chain Act =

German human rights and environmental law

Bundestag
- Long title: Obligation to Exercise Due Diligence in the Supply Chain Act
- Enacted: 3 March 2021
- Commenced: 2023–2026

Keywords
- Environmental law, human rights, labor rights, supply chain
- Status: Not fully in force

The Supply Chain Act (German: Lieferkettensorgfaltspflichtengesetz, literally Obligation to Exercise Due Diligence in the Supply Chain Act) is a German law requiring companies to monitor human rights and environmental risks in their supply chains.

== Summary ==
The law requires companies to carry out analyses on supply chain contracts to identify risks to human rights and requires companies to take action against identified risks. The companies will have to publish an annual report containing the analyses. Companies must also establish a complaint procedure for workers to report potential risks. The law additionally gives civil society organisations the ability to sue companies on behalf of workers over breaches of human rights in supply chains. Companies that fail to respect the terms of the law can face fines of up to two percent of the company's annual revenues.

The law came into effect starting with 2023, only applying to companies with over 3000 employees in its first year. As of now, the law only applies to one group of companies:

Companies that have their central administration, their principal place of business, their administrative headquarters or their statutory seat in Germany or companies that have a branch in Germany.

However, in 2024, the provisions of the law will extend to apply to all companies with over 1000 employees. In 2026, the federal government will carry out an evaluation of the law's effectiveness.

== Legislative history ==
The German federal cabinet proposed the law on 3 March 2021. It had originally been planned to be introduced in 2020, but negotiations were required between the government's coalition partners, with the Social Democratic Party of Germany eventually backing down on including small companies in the law after opposition from the CDU/CSU.

== Reactions ==
Human Rights Watch supported the passing of the law, stating that "the law is an important step toward meaningful corporate accountability" but that "it does not incorporate the highest international standards."

The Confederation of German Employers' Associations opposed the law, arguing that it was too strict, that it would force companies to stop operations in regions with poor human rights records, and that "foreign companies that do not have to comply with the German rules will jump in and replace German companies."

Observers have described the difficulties of performing independent inspections in Xinjiang, China, where there have been reports of forced labor in Xinjiang re-education camps. Auditors have reported harassment by Chinese police and state security officers.

In 2024, German Federal Economics Minister Robert Habeck (Greens) saw comprehensive reporting obligations as a problem for the German economy and called for a fundamental rethink. With regulations such as sustainability reporting, the deforestation directive or the supply chain law, ‘even with good intentions, we have taken a completely wrong turn’, he said, emphasizing that competitiveness is under pressure in Germany and red tape should be cut. He spoke in favour of giving entrepreneurs more responsibility again and against reporting obligations.

== Future EU directive ==
The European Union is expected to follow Germany in the coming years with a similarly sweeping piece of legislation. Specifically, the proposed Corporate Sustainability Due Diligence Directive will cover the same measures as the German Supply Chain Act and is built to level the playing field for ESG initiatives and the people throughout the supply chain.
