= Tettnang =

- Town
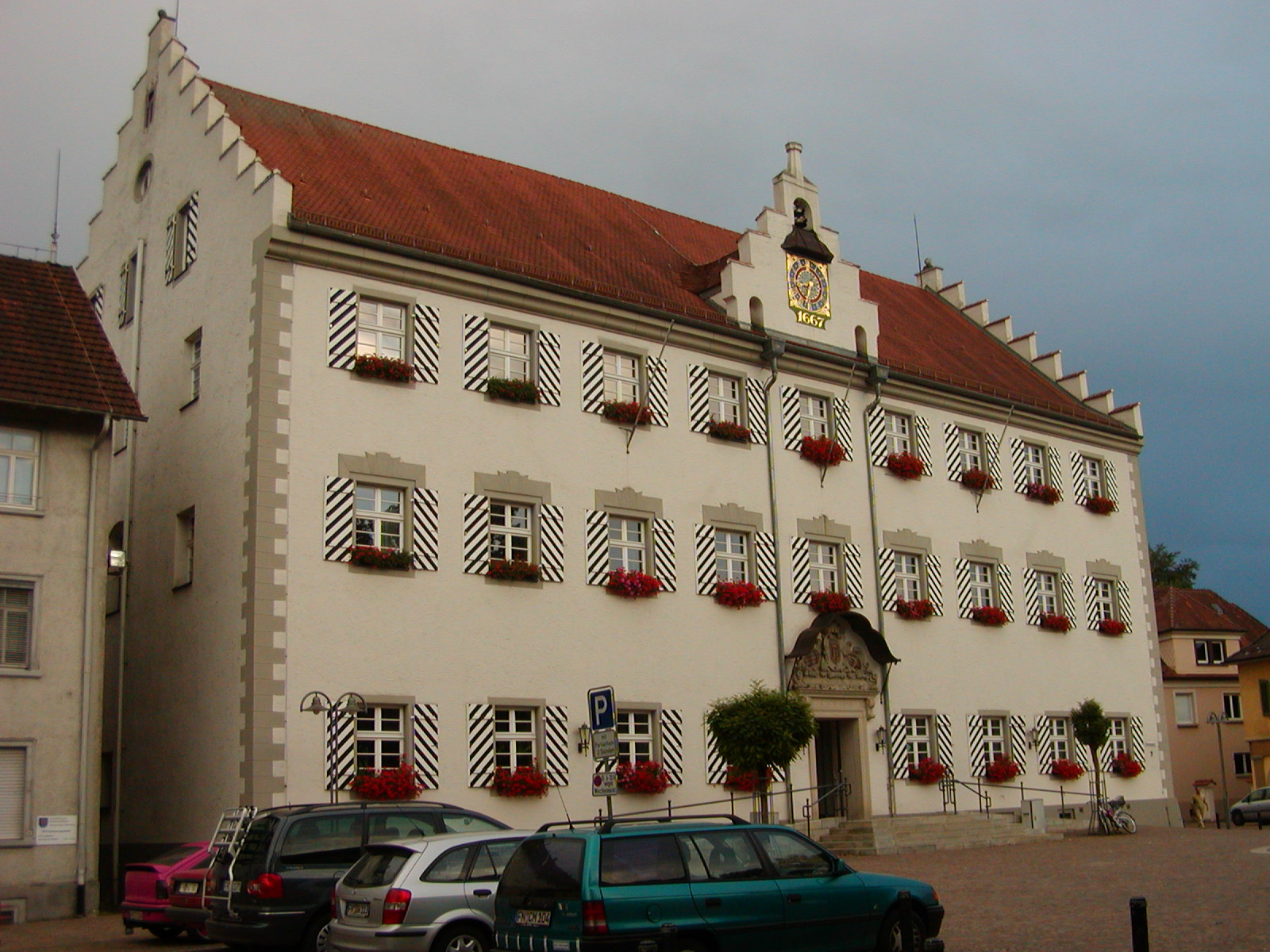
- Town Hall (Old Castle)

- Coat of arms

- Location of Tettnang within Bodenseekreis district
- Interactive map of Tettnang
- Location within Germany Location within Baden-Württemberg
- Coordinates: 47°40′15″N 09°35′15″E
- Country: Germany
- State: Baden-Württemberg
- Admin. region: Tübingen
- District: Bodenseekreis

Government
  - Mayor (2023–31): Regine Rist (Freie Wähler)

Area
  - Total: 71.25 km^{2} (27.51 sq mi)
- Elevation: 466 m (1,529 ft)

Population (2025-12-31)
  - Total: 20,522
  - Density: 288.0/km^{2} (746.0/sq mi)
- Time zone: UTC+01:00 (CET)
  - Summer (DST): UTC+02:00 (CEST)
- Postal codes: 88069
- Dialling codes: 07542
- Vehicle registration: TT, FN
- Website: www.tettnang.de

Tettnang (German pronunciation: [ˈtɛtnaŋ]) is a town in the Bodensee district in the Swabia region of southern Baden-Württemberg, Germany.

It lies 7 kilometres from Lake Constance. The region produces significant quantities of Tettnang hops, an ingredient in beer, and ships them to breweries throughout the world.

== History ==
Tettinang or Tettinac was first mentioned in 882 in a document of the Abbey of St. Gall. At the beginning of the 10th century the castle of the Counts of Montfort was built near the town. The town privileges were granted in 1294 by King Adolf of Nassau. The reign of the Counts of Montfort ended in 1780 when they sold the county to Austria, along with Tettnang Castle to pay debts. The county became part of Further Austria under the house of Habsburg. In the Peace of Pressburg of 1805 it became Bavarian property which gave it to Württemberg five years later. With the merging of Baden, Hohenzollern and Württemberg in 1952 it became part of the newly formed state of Baden-Württemberg. Until 1973 it was the capital of the district Tettnang, which was merged with parts of the district of Überlingen to form the Bodenseekreis.

== Population development ==
Year	1450	1848	1960	1990	2000	2005	2006	2007	2009	2010	2015	2020	2021	2022	2023	2024
Inhabitants	~ 650	~ 1,400	7,115	16,251	17,432	18,323	18,213	18,467	18,571	18,806	18,975	19,996	20,134	20,452	20,682	20,843

== Trivia ==
The second release of the Linux operating system Fedora was named "Tettnang" because of the hops grown in Tettnang used in making beer. The release was preceded by the beer-related name "Yarrow" (an early substitute for hops) and followed by "Heidelberg" (a German city and the name of a distributor of beer).

The anti-virus software vendor Avira, a company with around 100 million customers and 500 employees all over the world, has its headquarters in Tettnang. Based near Lake Constance, the security specialist is one of the region's biggest entrepreneurs.

== Gallery ==
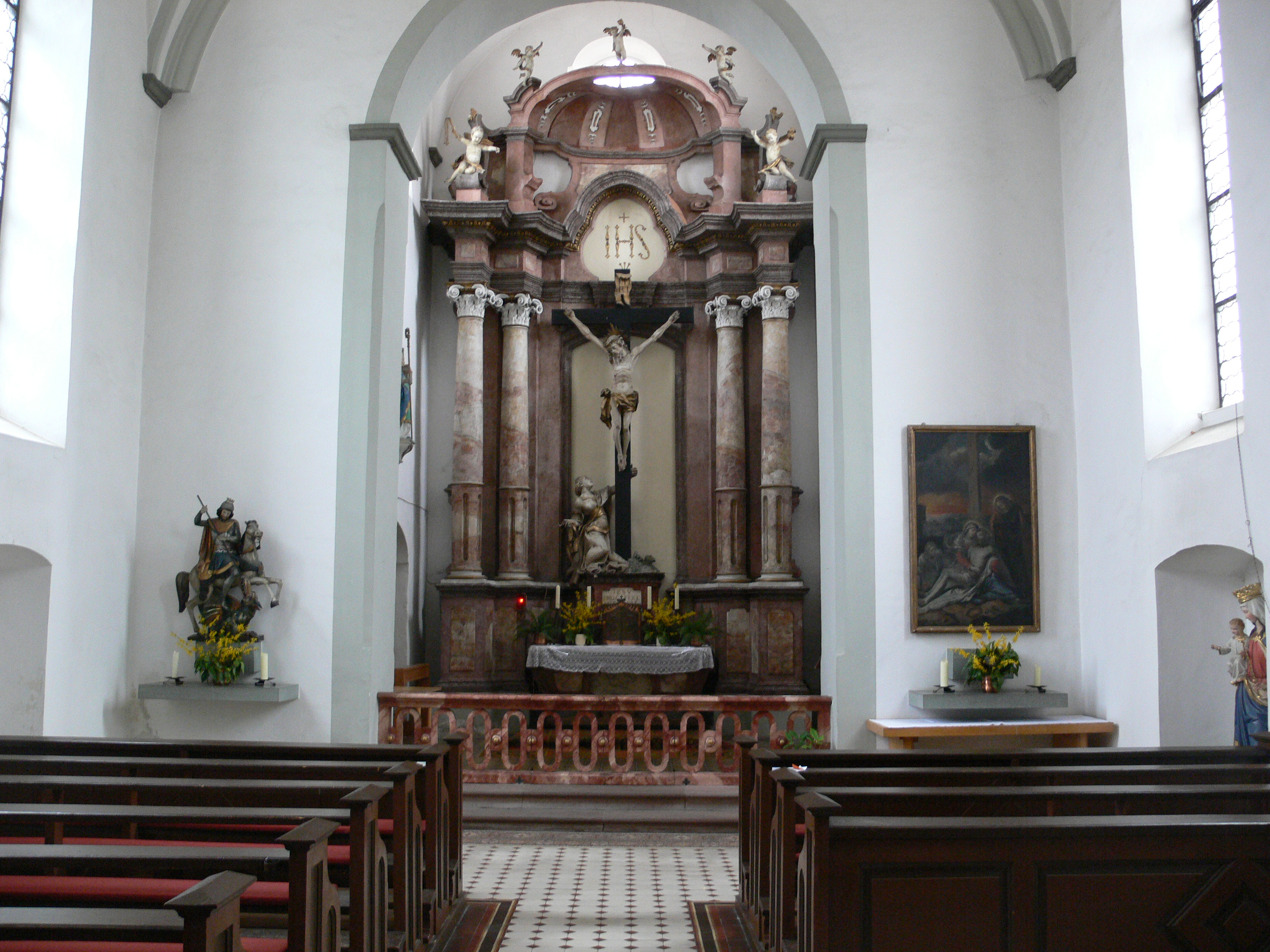
Altar of Saint George's church, Tettnang

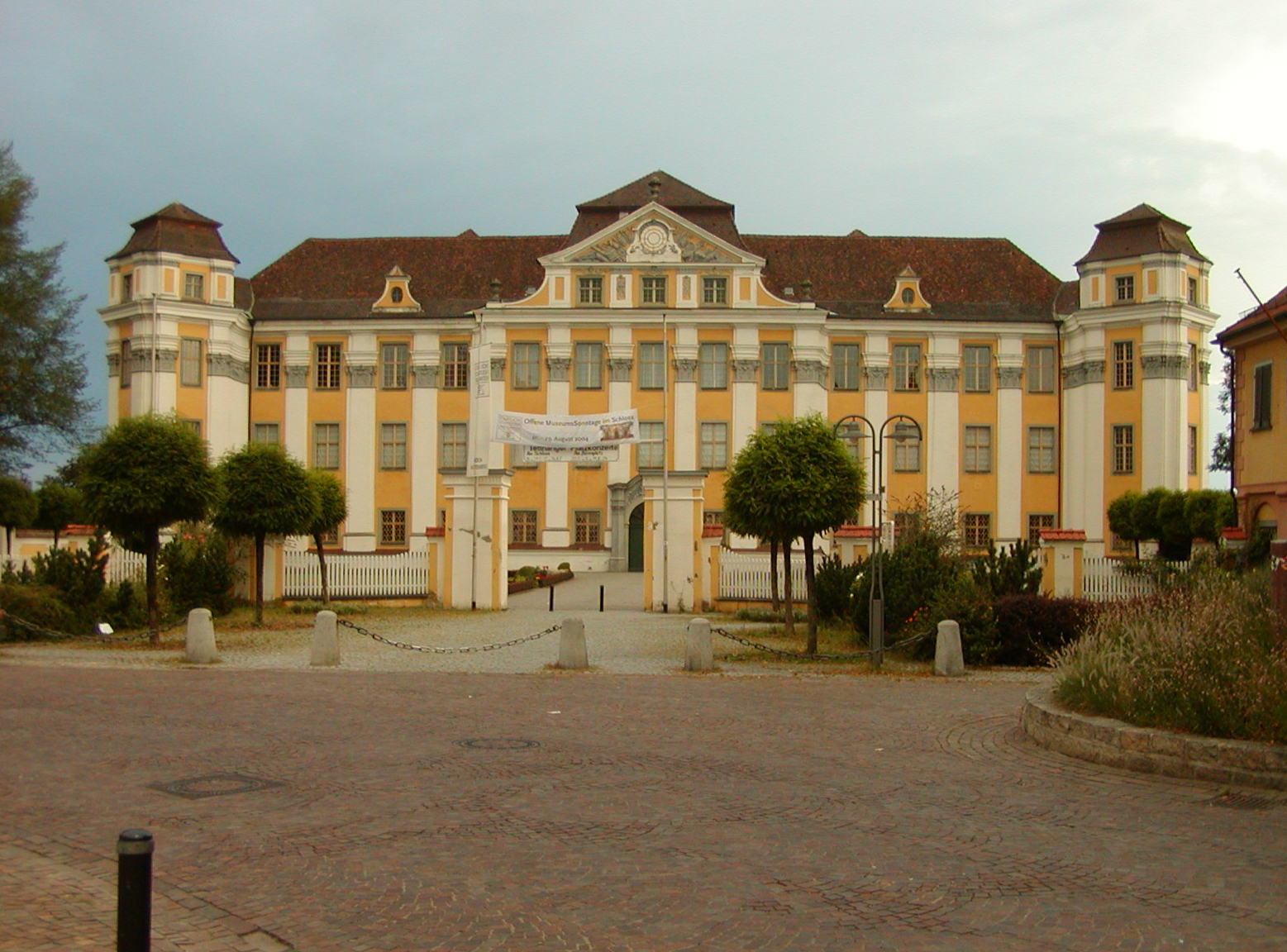
The new castle

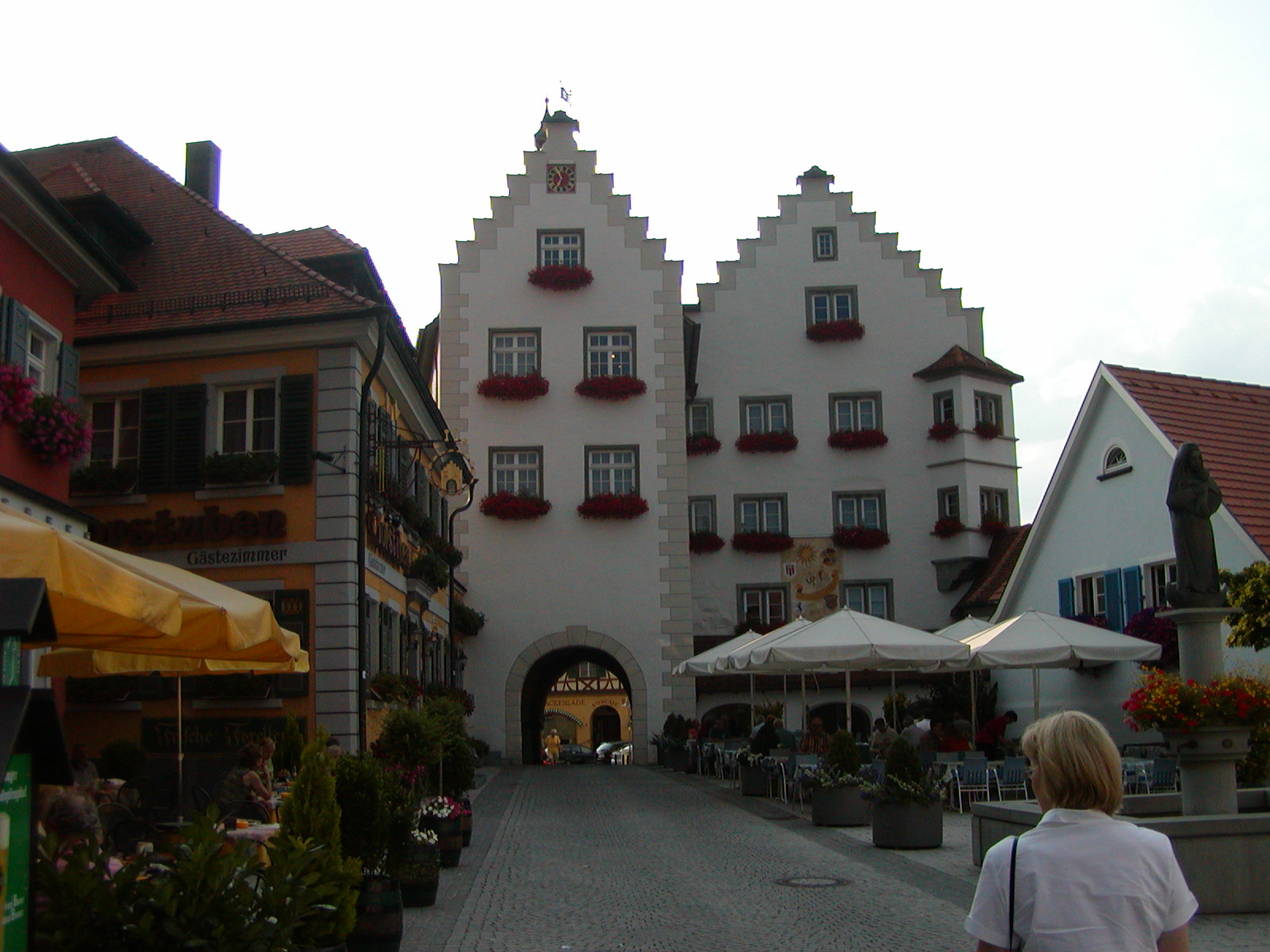
Gate Castle

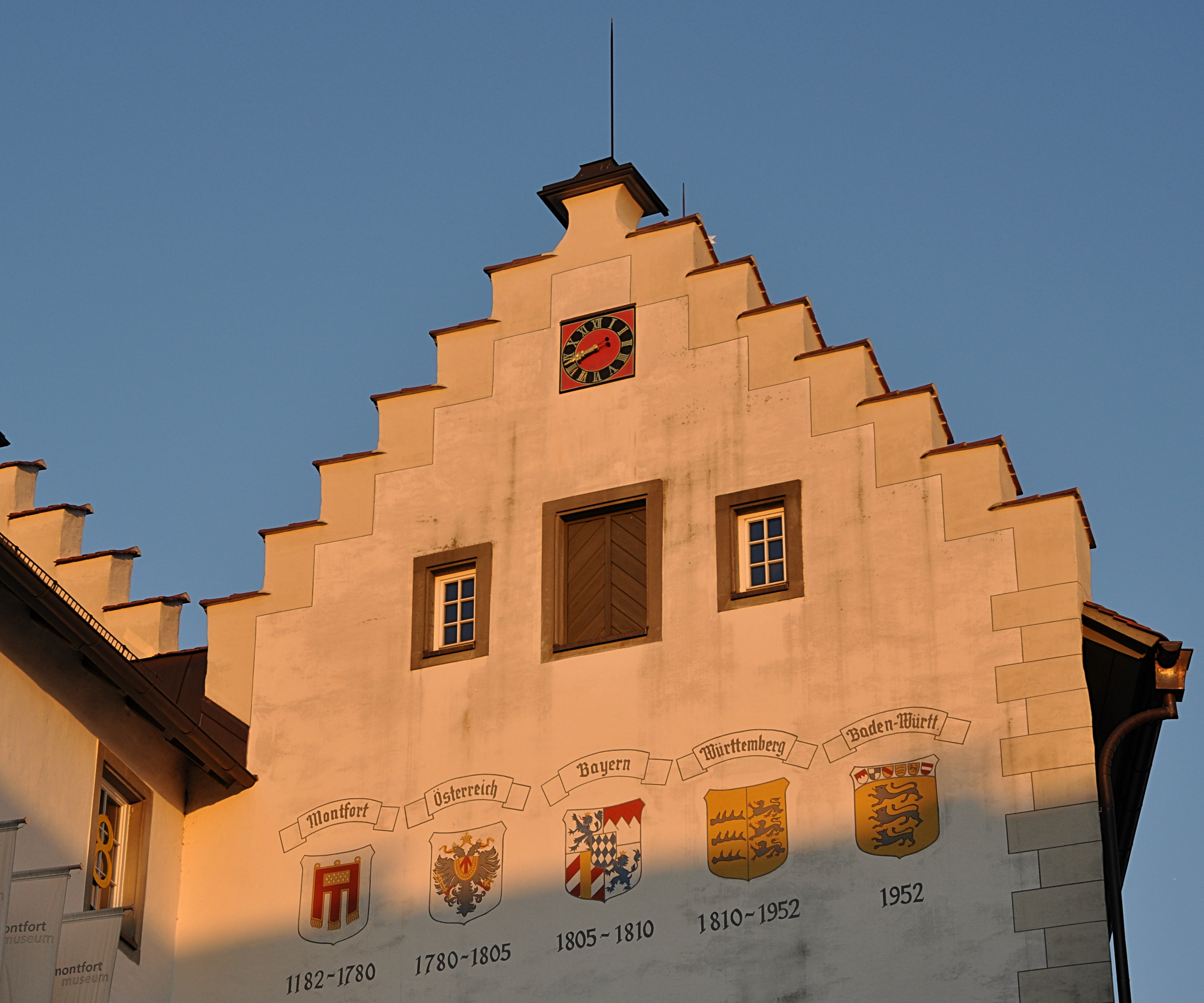
Gate Castle with Coats of arms

== Notable people ==
- Juliane Banse (born 1969), soprano
- Winfried Brugger (1950–2010), legal scientist
- Antje von Dewitz (born 1972), business woman
- Giulia Gwinn (born 1999), footballer
- Marco Mathis (born 1994), cyclist
- Sascha Rösler (born 1977), footballer
- Thiemo Storz (born 1991), racing car driver
- Gregor Traber (born 1992), athlete
