= Murals in Tibetan Buddhist monasteries =

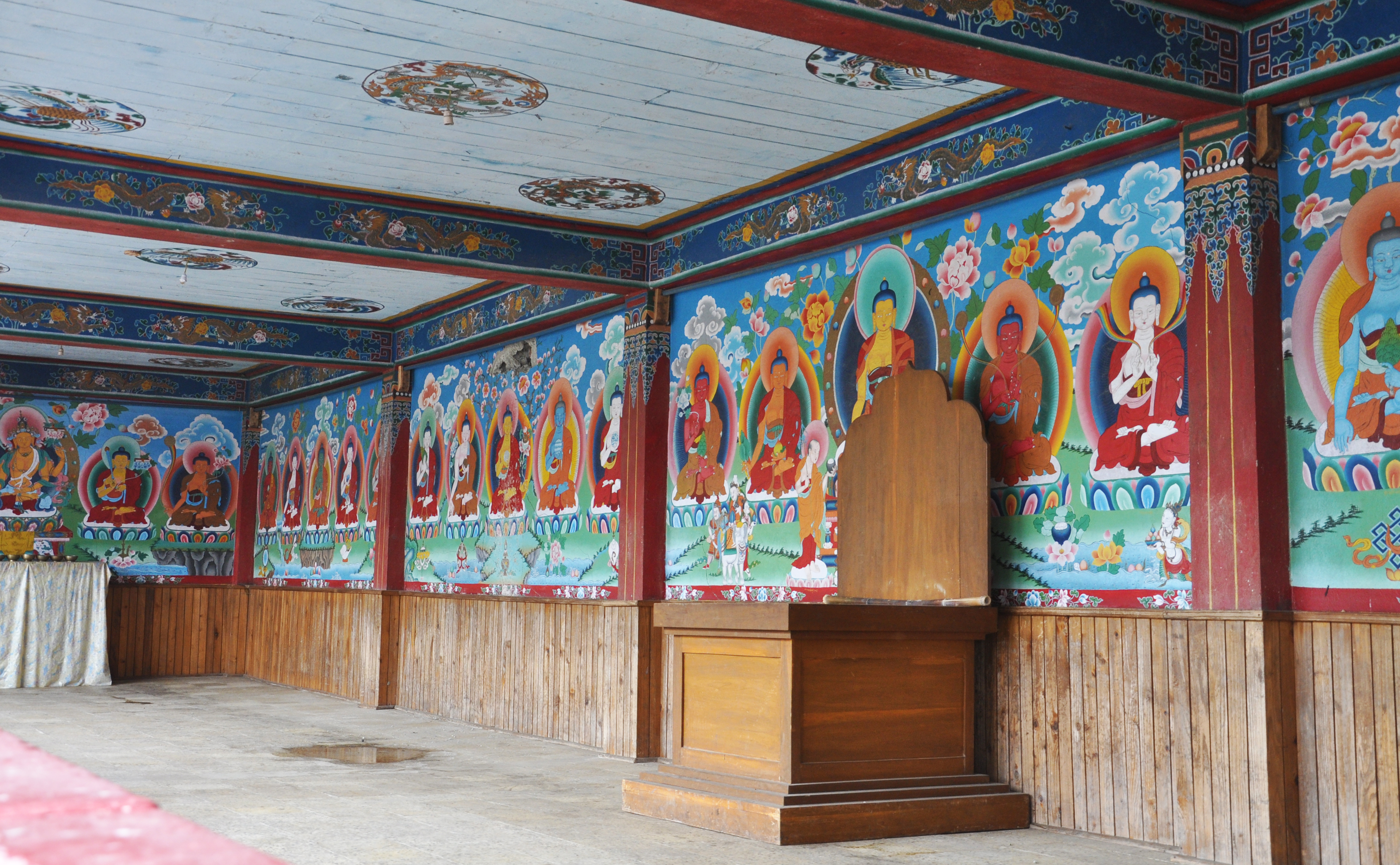
Murals at Phensong Monastery in Sikkim, India

Tibetan monasteries are known for their culture and traditions, which are rooted in Buddhist teachings. An important aspect of Tibetan Buddhist monasteries are ritualistic places dedicated to deities. Vajrayana Buddhism features intricate iconography which depicts deities and religious practices. To a devotee, images and icons bring luck or expel evil spirits. Thangkas at monasteries depict the Buddha, gurus, yantras, and mandalas which bring good luck, health, prosperity, wisdom, longevity, and peace.

Thangkas are colorful pictorial representations of religious iconography, fables, and philosophy, which became popular when they were introduced around the 8th century. The thangkas were painted on fabric that could be rolled, and their portability helped Buddhist monks to carry them from one place to another. Thangkas, as a medium for the propagation of ideology, spread from Nepal to Tibet and then to Mongolia.

== Types ==
Murals serve as visual representations of Buddhist teachings, stories, and deities. They acquaint followers with Buddhist tenets and its pantheon, history, folklore, and religious and cosmic objects.

Monastery murals
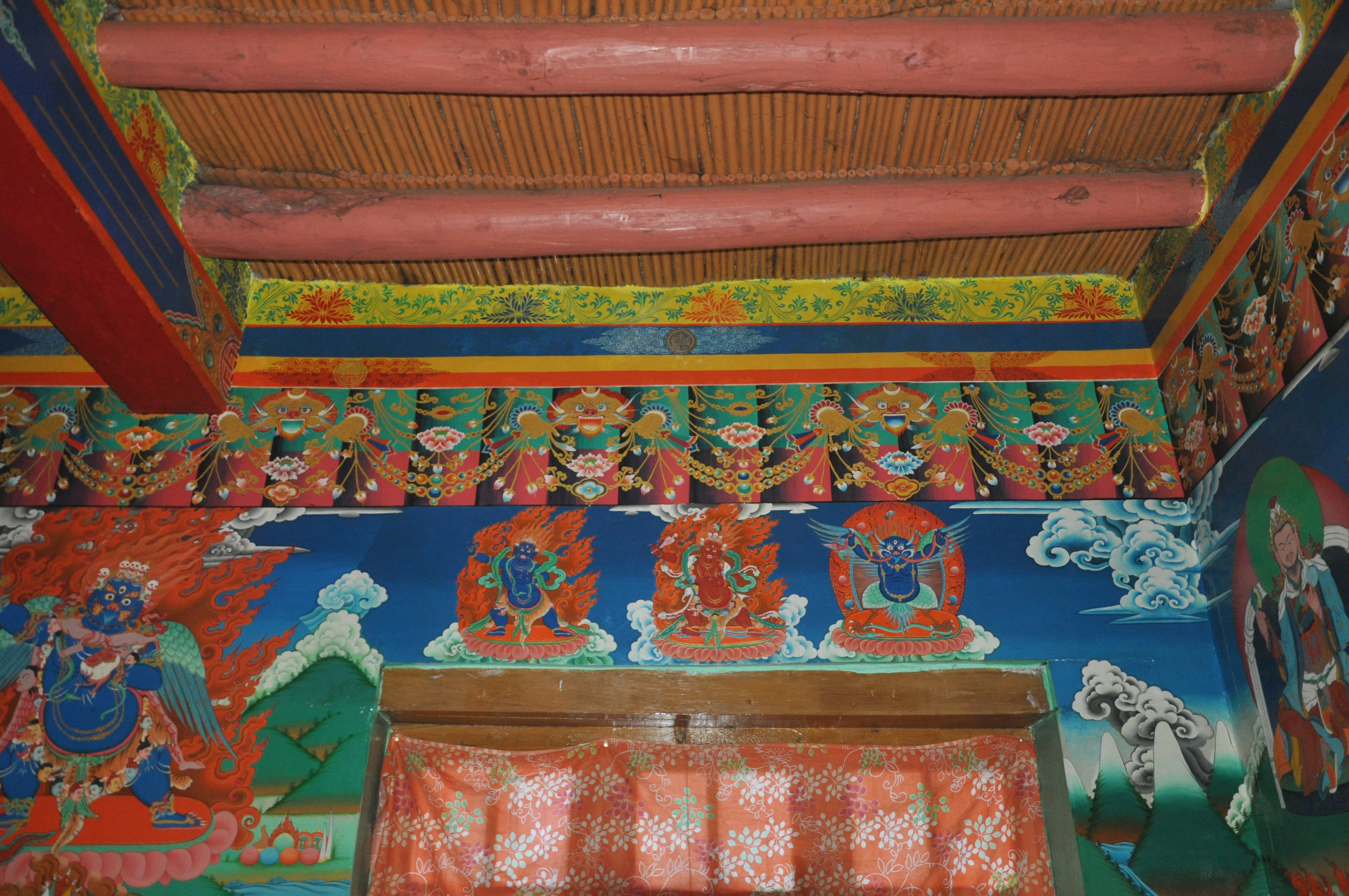
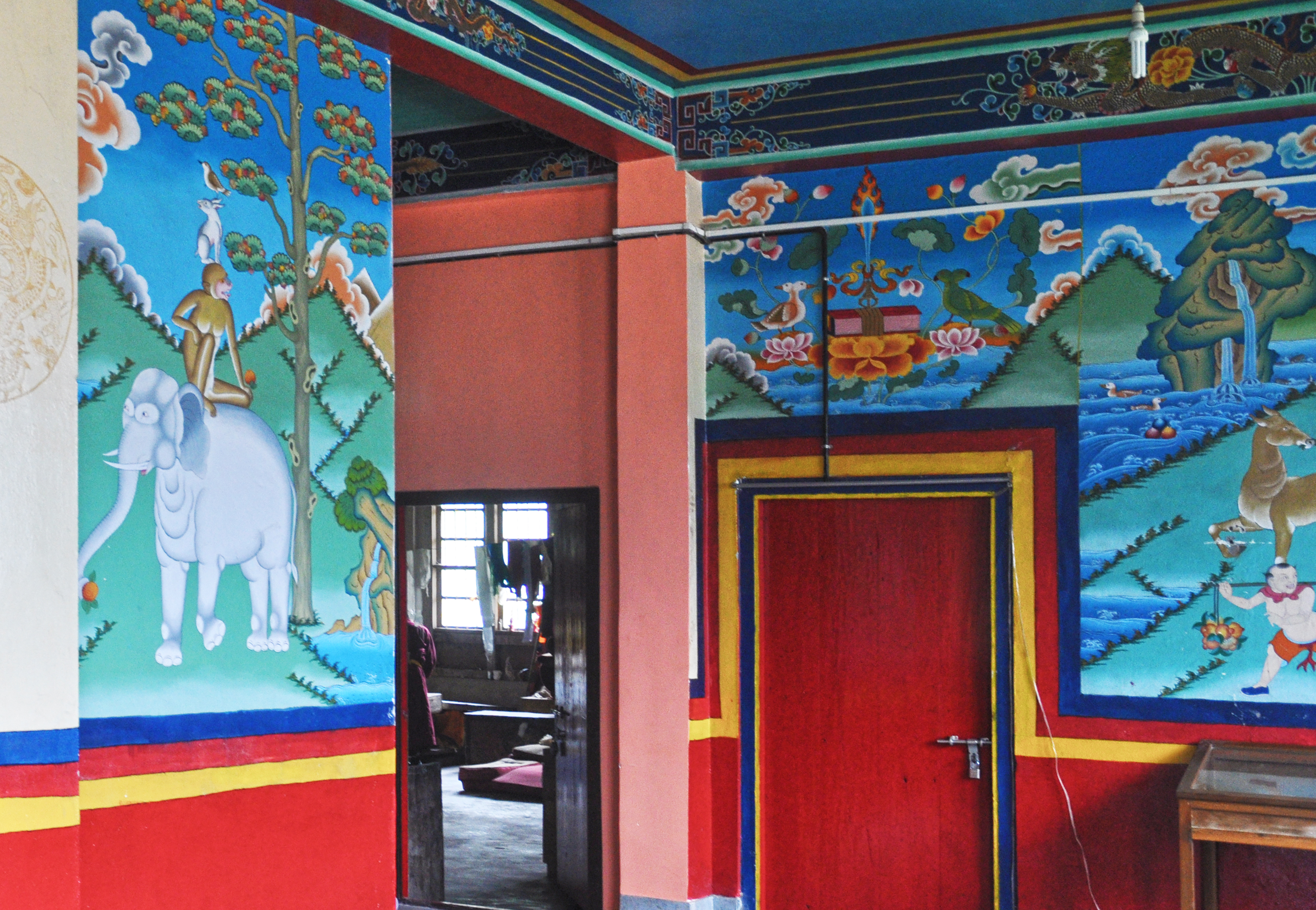
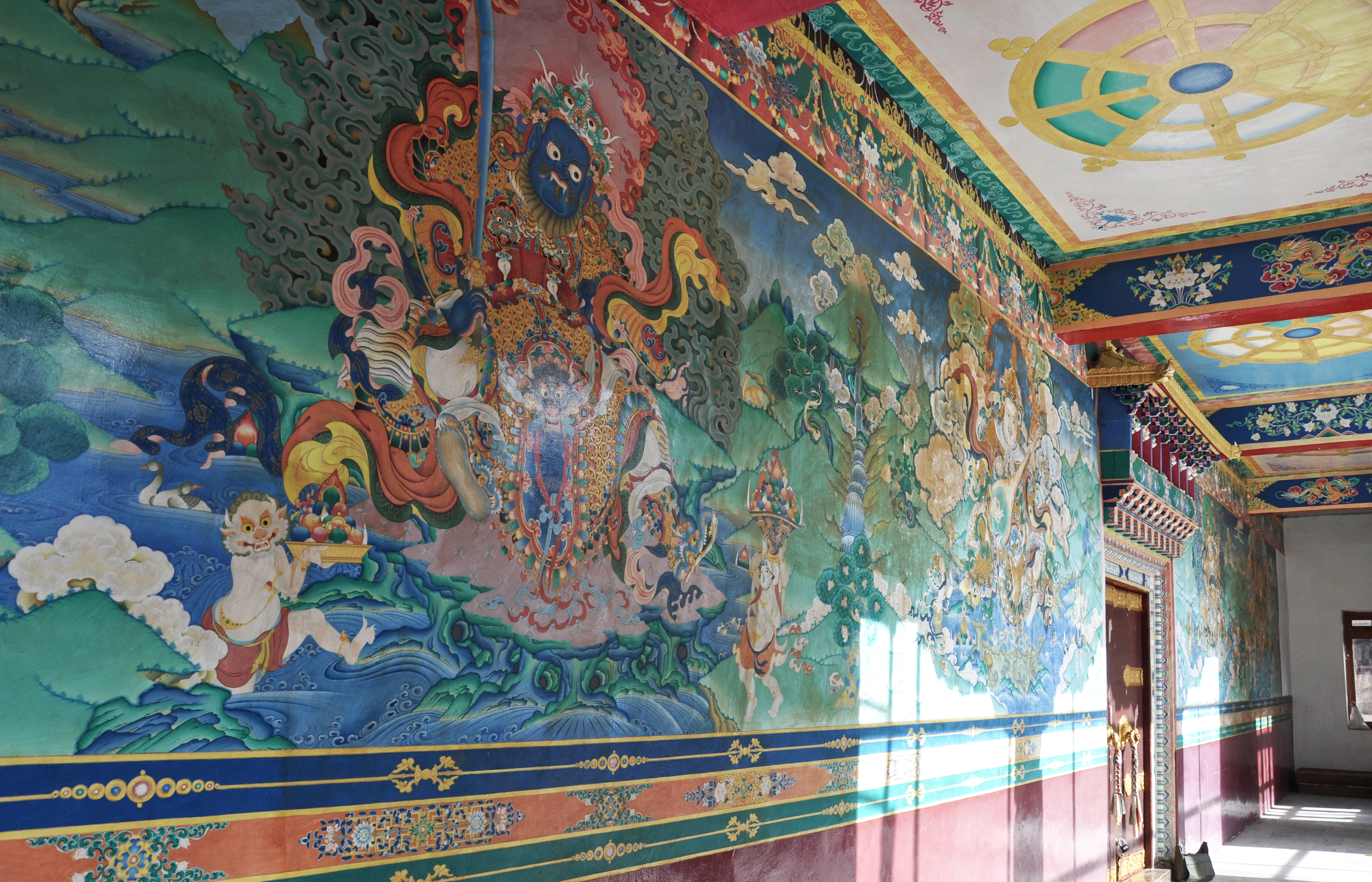
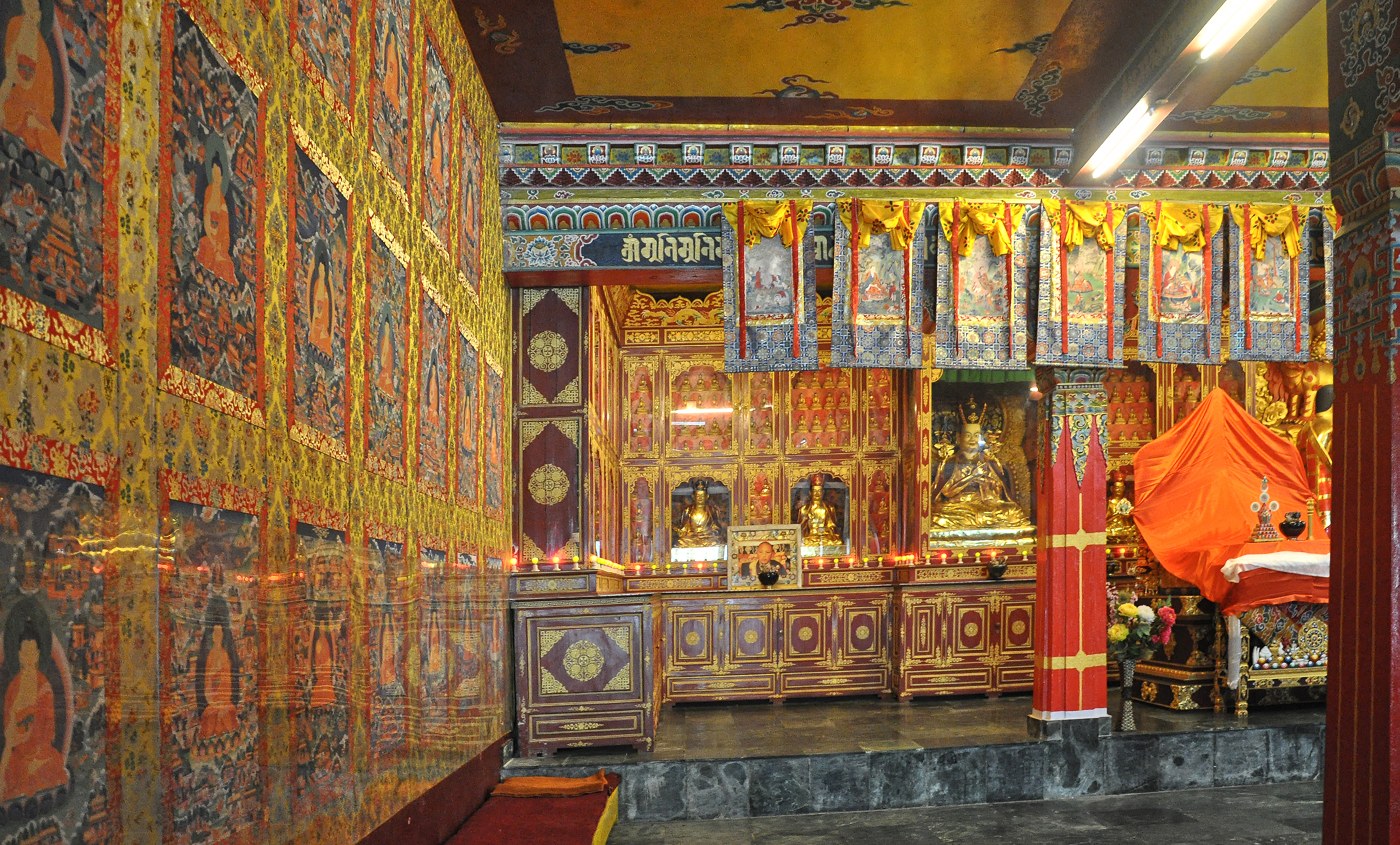
(left to right) Murals at Stakrimo Monastery in Zanskar, Lippa Monastery, Key Monastery in Himachal Pradesh, and thangkas at Ralang Monastery

=== Lineages ===
Murals depict the lineages of gurus (religious teachers) and their disciples. The guru-disciple relationship is fundamental to all schools of Tibetan Buddhism (Vajrayana). Knowledge and religious practices are passed from a guru to their disciples. Murals represent the array of guru lineages. Each school has its gurus and lineage of disciples. Tibetan Buddhism has five schools, the most recent of which is Bon. The other schools are Nyingma, Sakya, Kagyu, and Gelug.

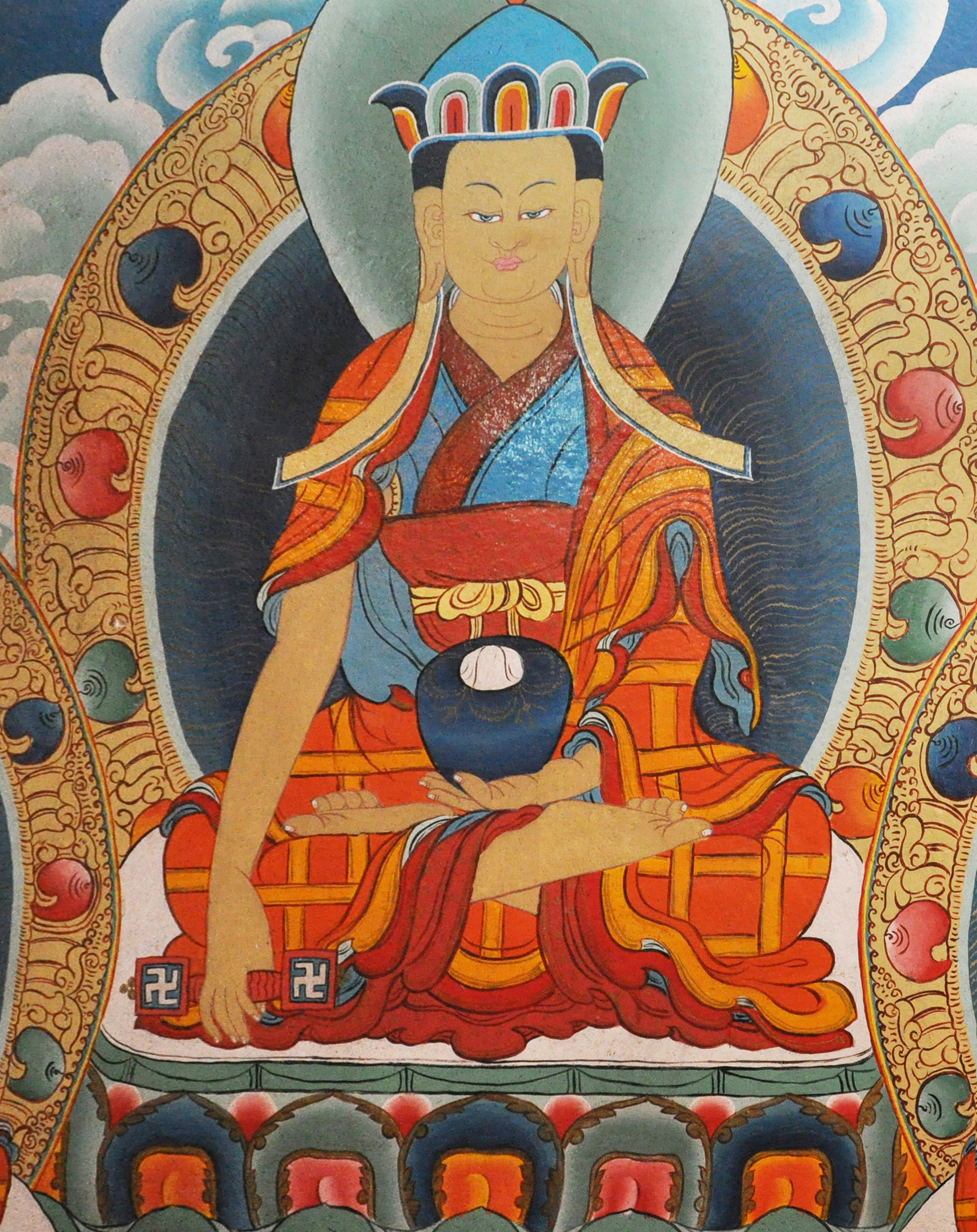
Shenrab Miwo, founder of Bon

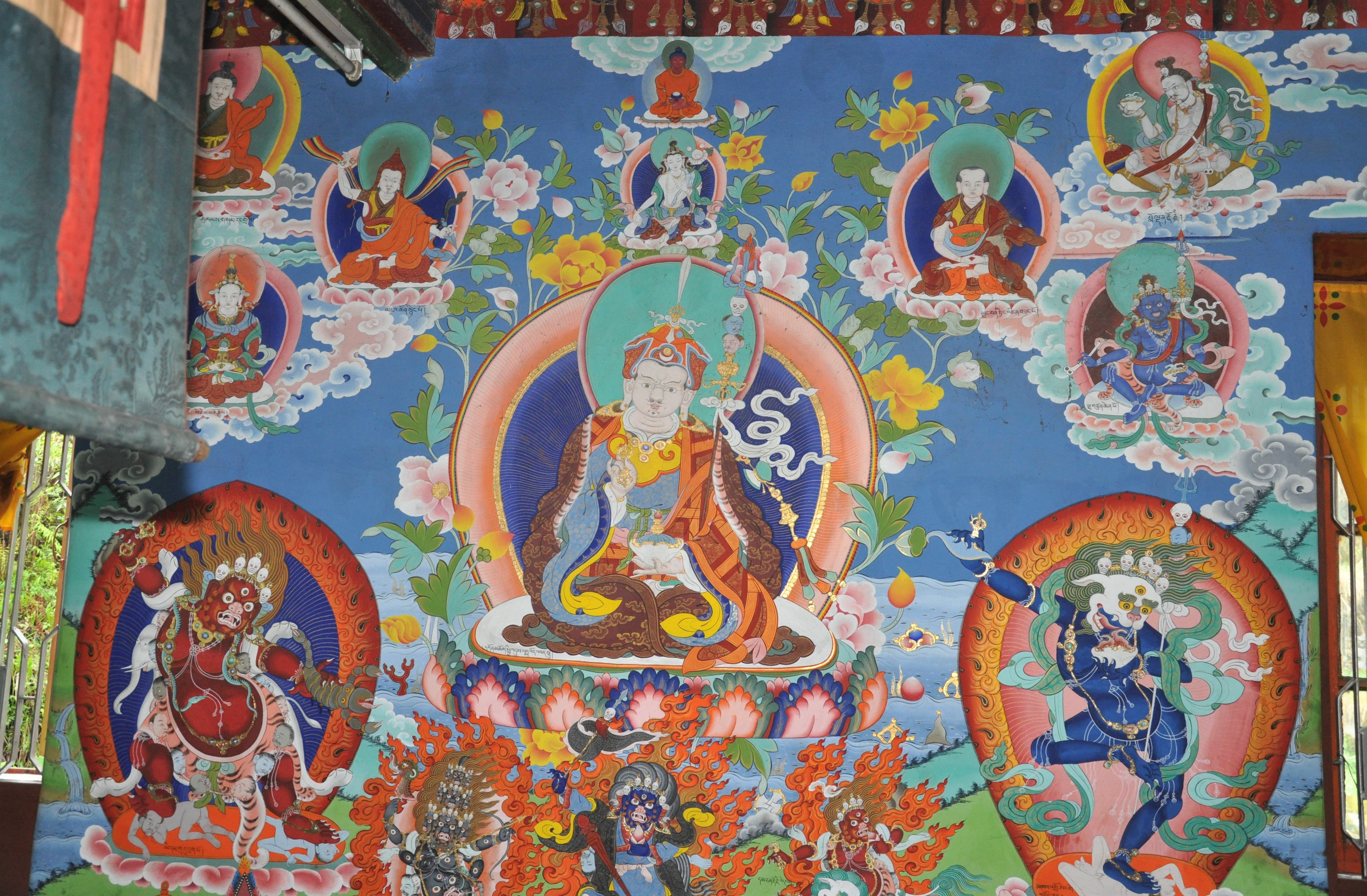
Guru Rinpoche in Lachung Monastery

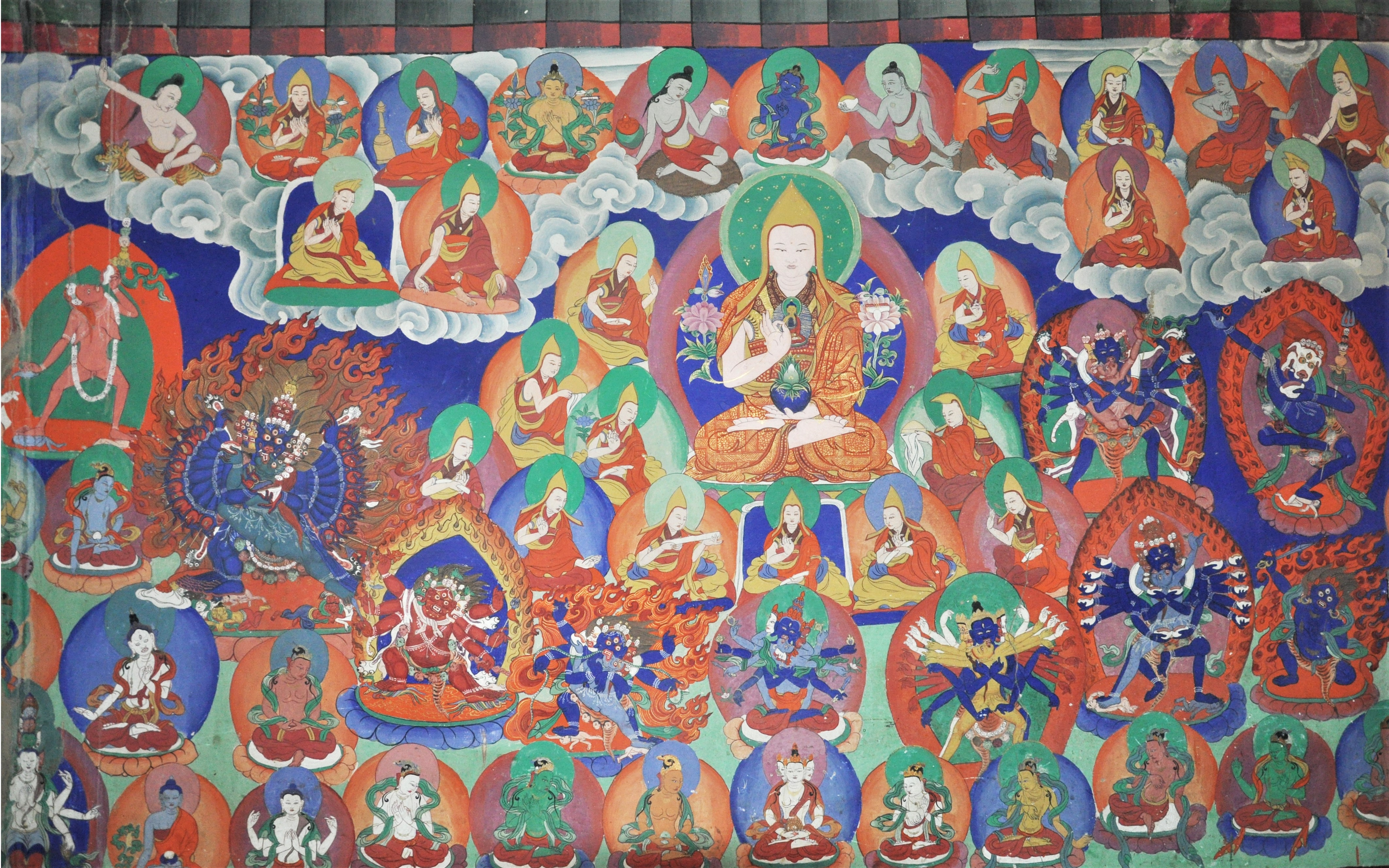
Tsongkhapa and disciples

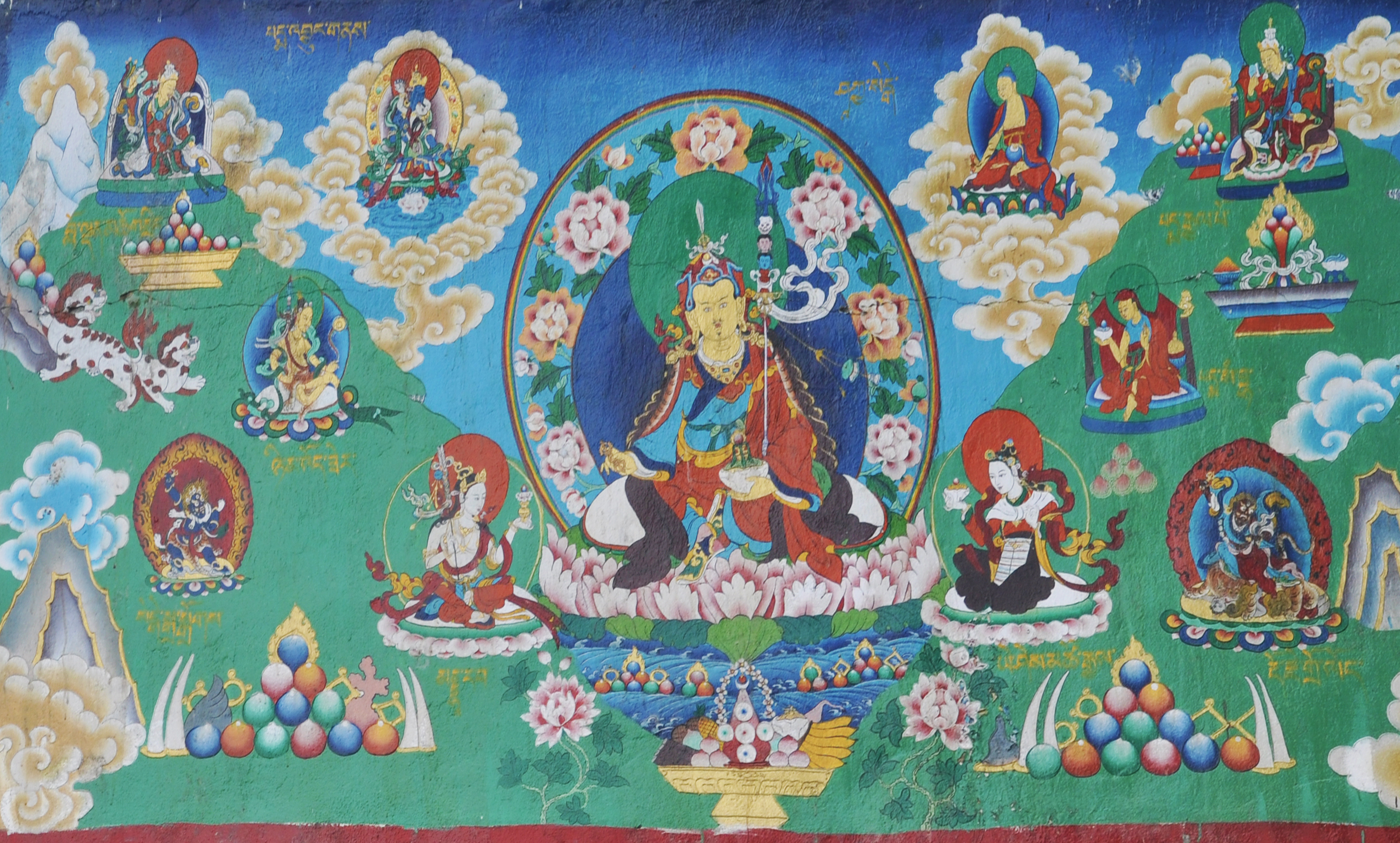
Padmasambhava and his retinue

Mahasiddhas are saints who achieved the direct realization of the Buddha's teachings in a single lifetime. Hailing from all walks of life, eighty-four Mahasiddhas have lived between 750 and 1150 CE.

Paintings at Hemis Monastery

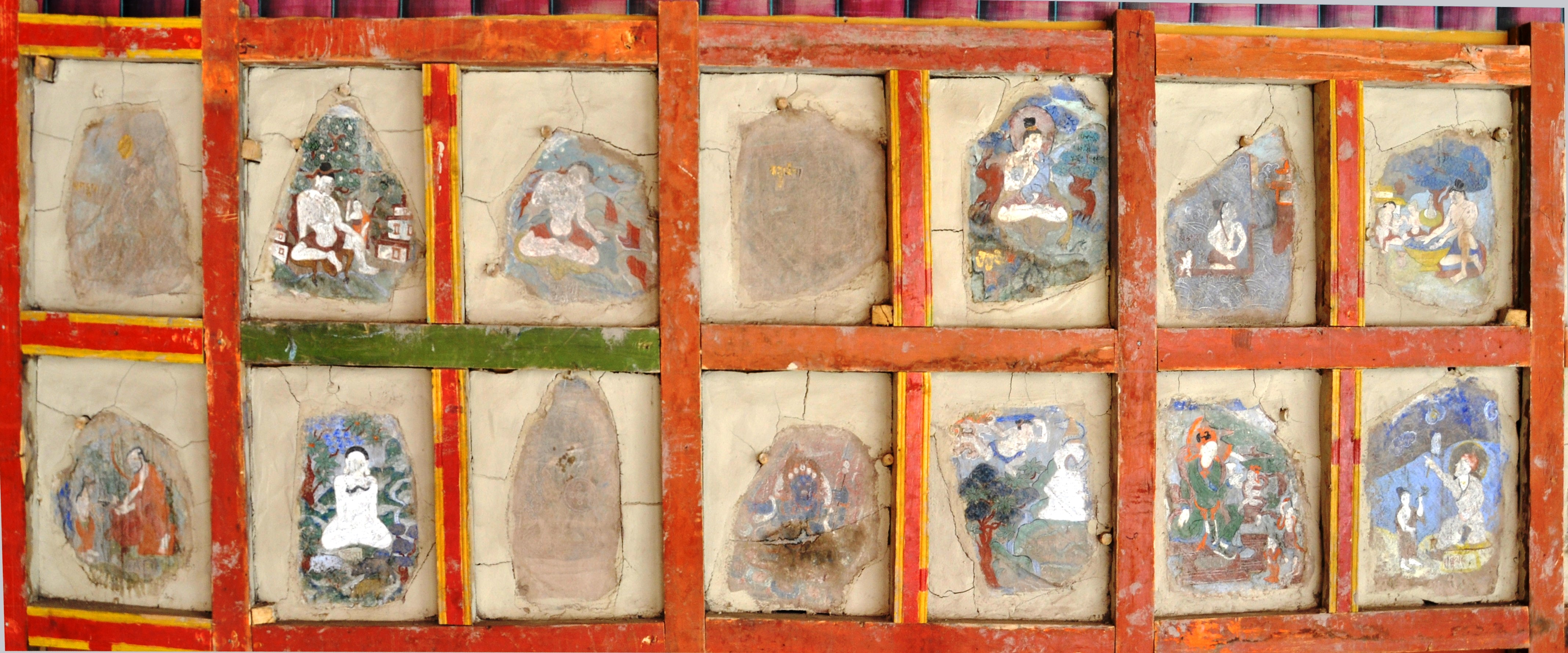

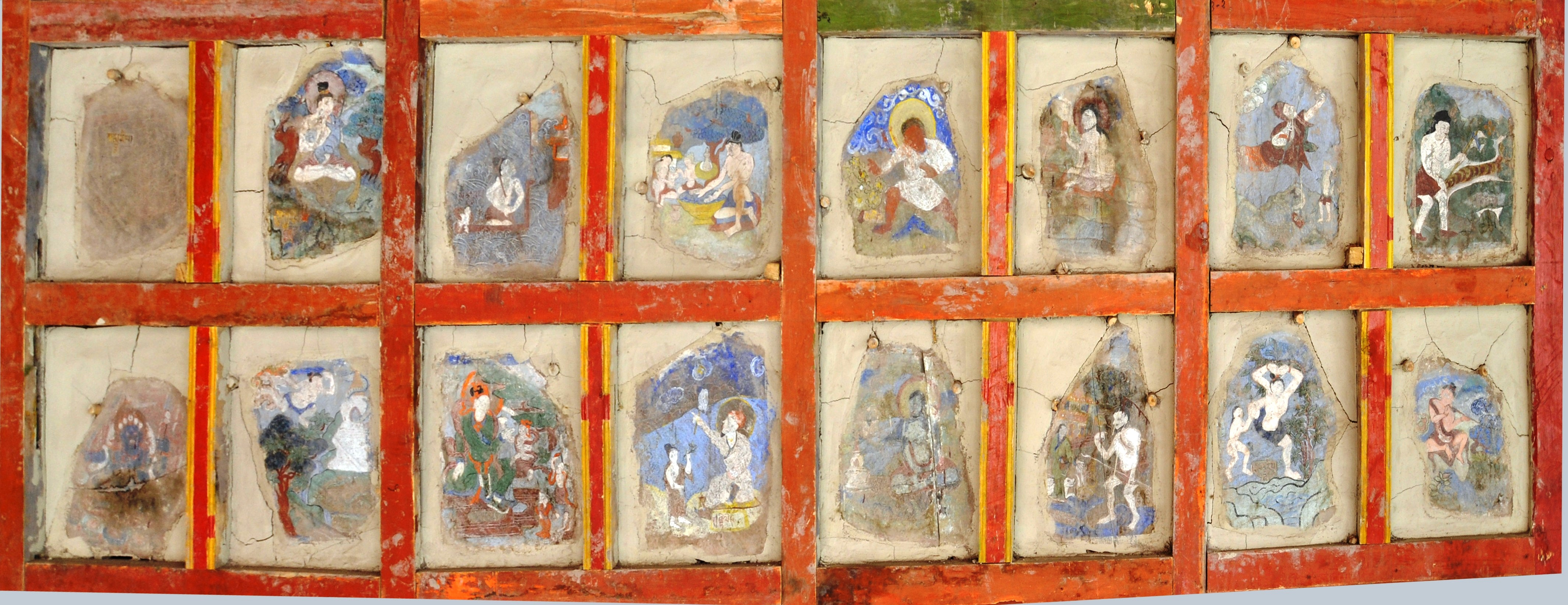

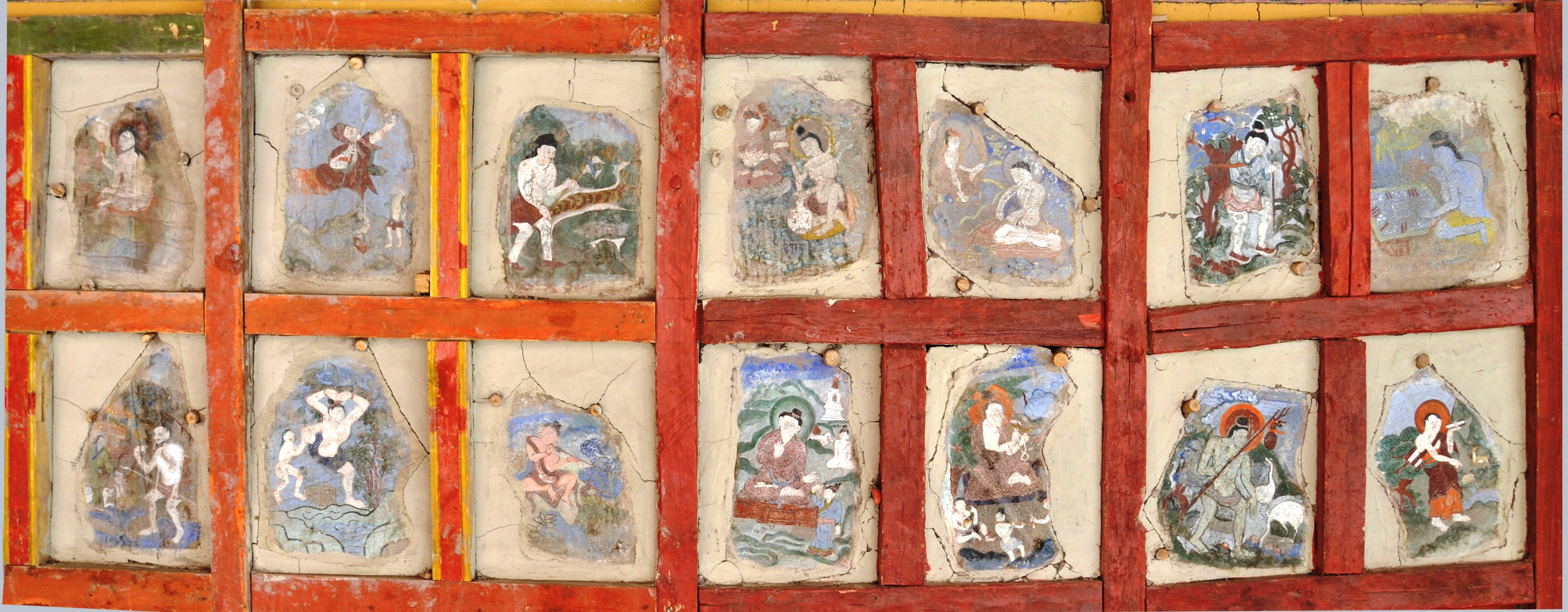

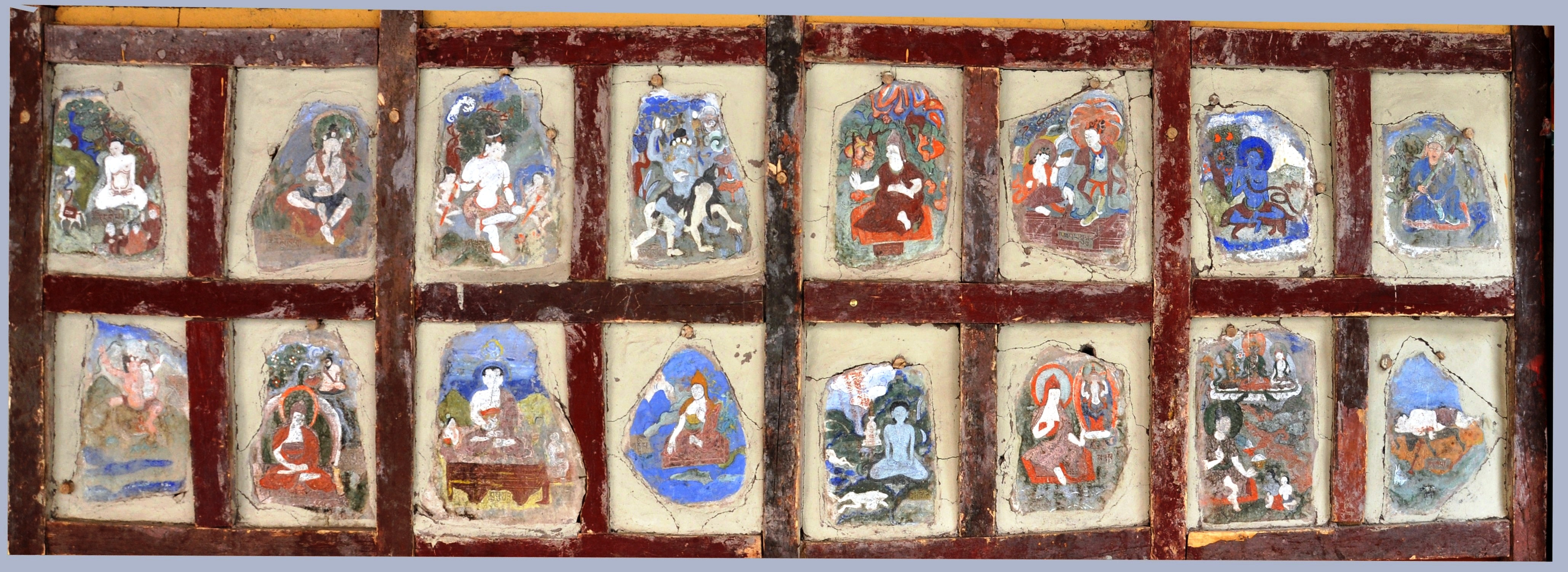

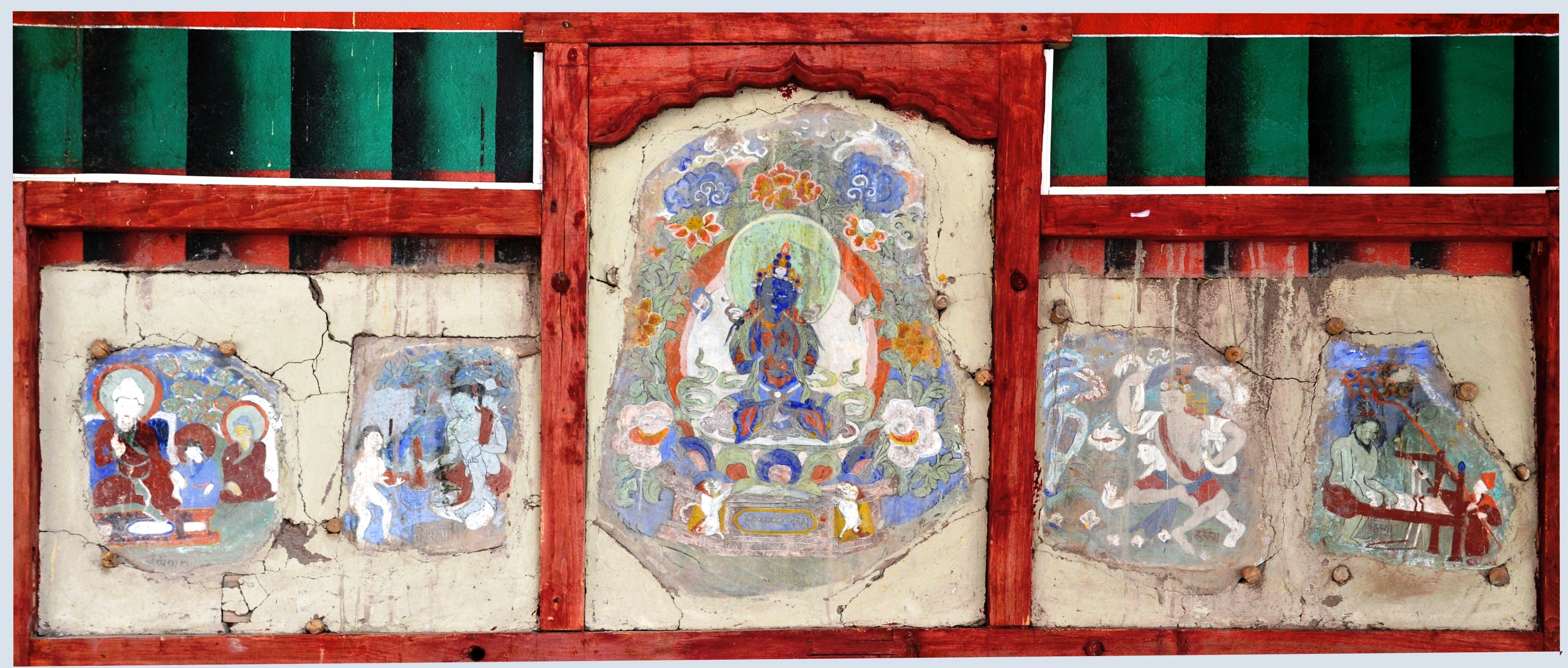

=== Bodhisattvas ===
Shakyamuni, also known as Gautama Buddha, is often at the center of murals. Representing enlightenment, he embodies wisdom, compassion, and liberation. The Five Buddha Families represent different aspects of enlightenment. Each family is associated with a specific Buddha, color, element, wisdom aspect, and emotion. In Vajrayana iconography, the visualization of Buddha in five forms is known as Dhyani Buddha. Buddha images are created with Vairocana in the center and Amitabha (Yodpame) in the west, Akshobhya (Mitrugpa) in the east, Amoghasidhi (Donyen Dondrup) in the north, and Ratnasambhava (Rinchen Jungney) in the south.

Vairochana (white)
Associated with the element of space and representing the wisdom of all-encompassing consciousness, it transforms ignorance into the wisdom of reality.
Akshobhya (blue)
Associated with water, it transforms anger and aggression into mirror-like wisdom that reflects things as they are.
Ratnasambhava (yellow)
Associated with the earth and representing equanimity and richness, it transforms pride into the wisdom of equanimity.
Amitabha (red)
Associated with fire, it transforms attachment and desire into wisdom that sees the true nature of phenomena.
Amoghasiddhi (green)
Associated with air and wind, it transforms jealousy into the wisdom that completes all actions.

These Buddha families are depicted in murals to represent the full spectrum of enlightened qualities, and to inspire practitioners to cultivate and embody these qualities in their spiritual journey.

Bodhisattvas are compassionate beings who have attained advanced levels of realization but postpone their own enlightenment to help sentient beings. Avalokiteshvara (the embodiment of compassion), Manjushri (the embodiment of wisdom), and Vajrapani (the embodiment of power) are among the most-revered bodhisattvas depicted in murals.

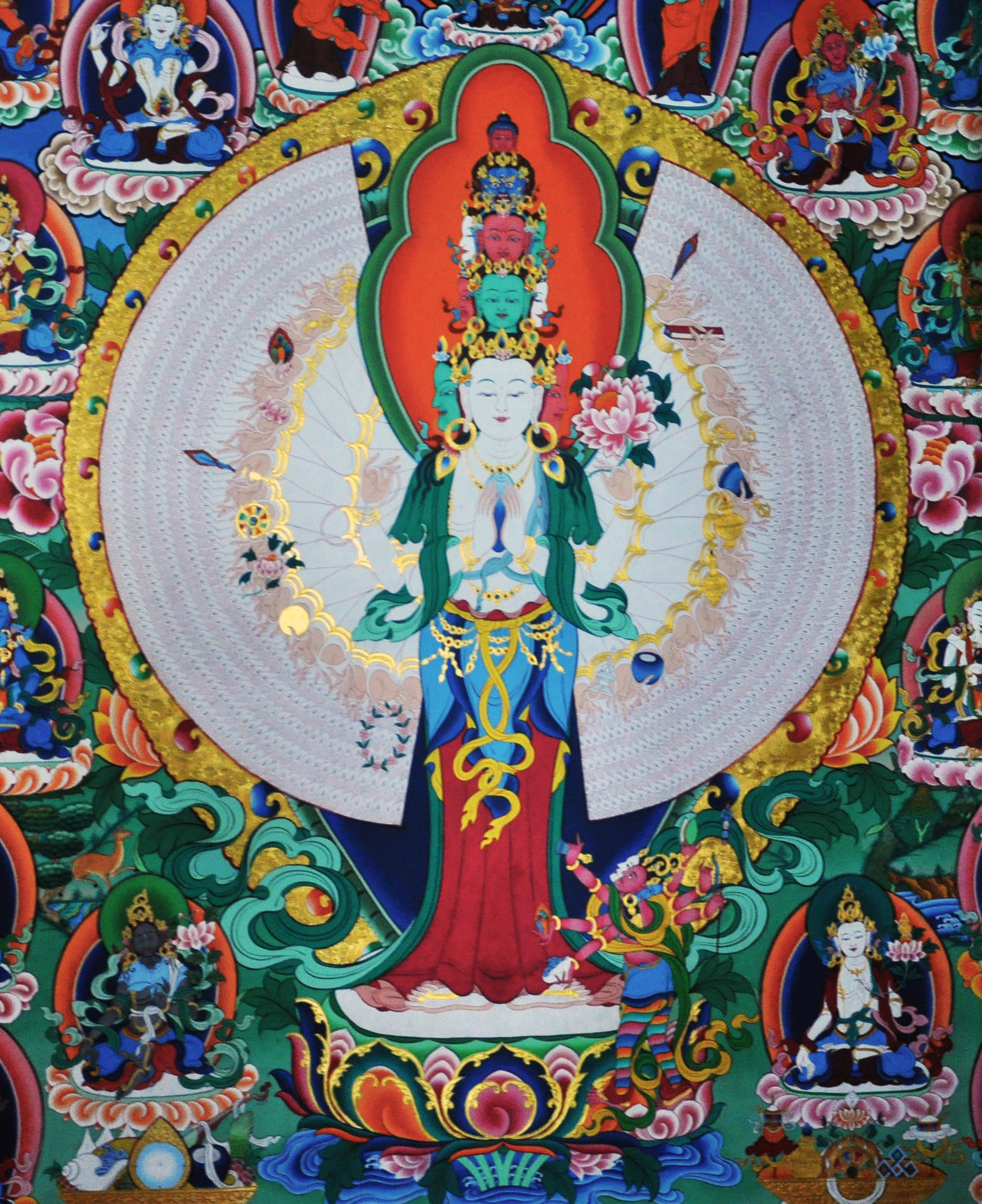
Avalokiteshvara in a Thongsa gompa

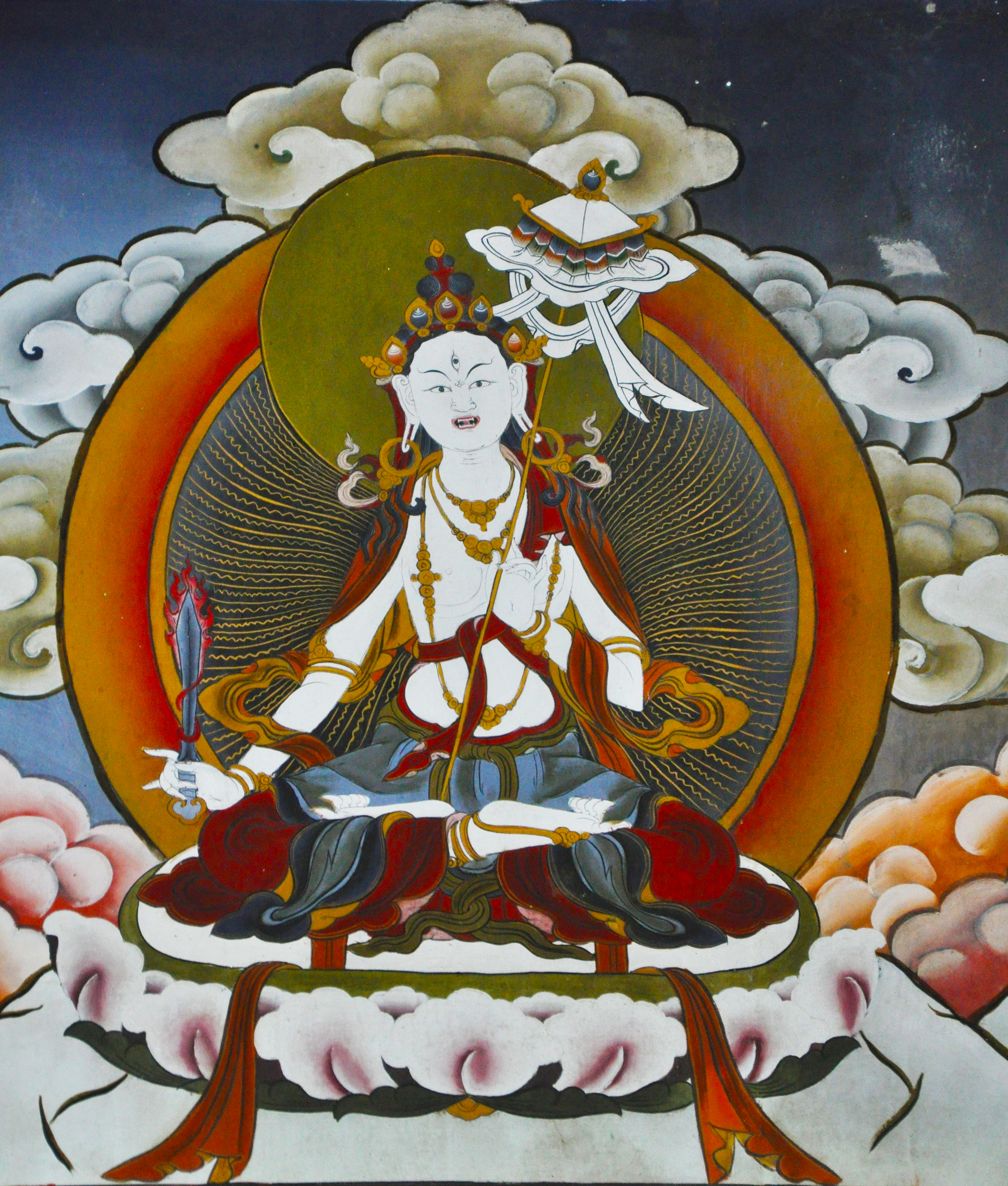
Manjushri in Tawang Monastery

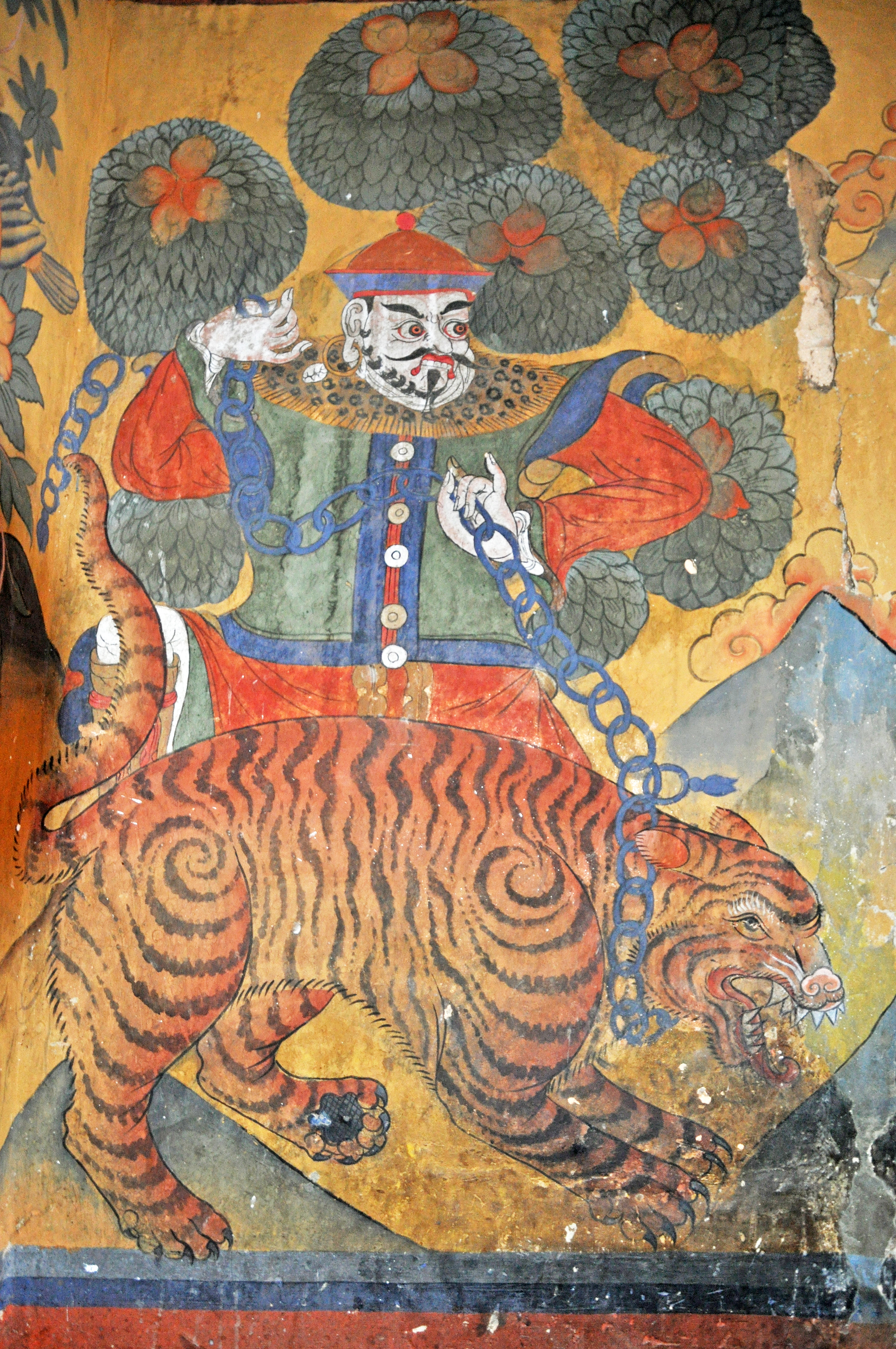
Manjushri, Avalokiteshvara and Vajrapani in the Jampa Temple

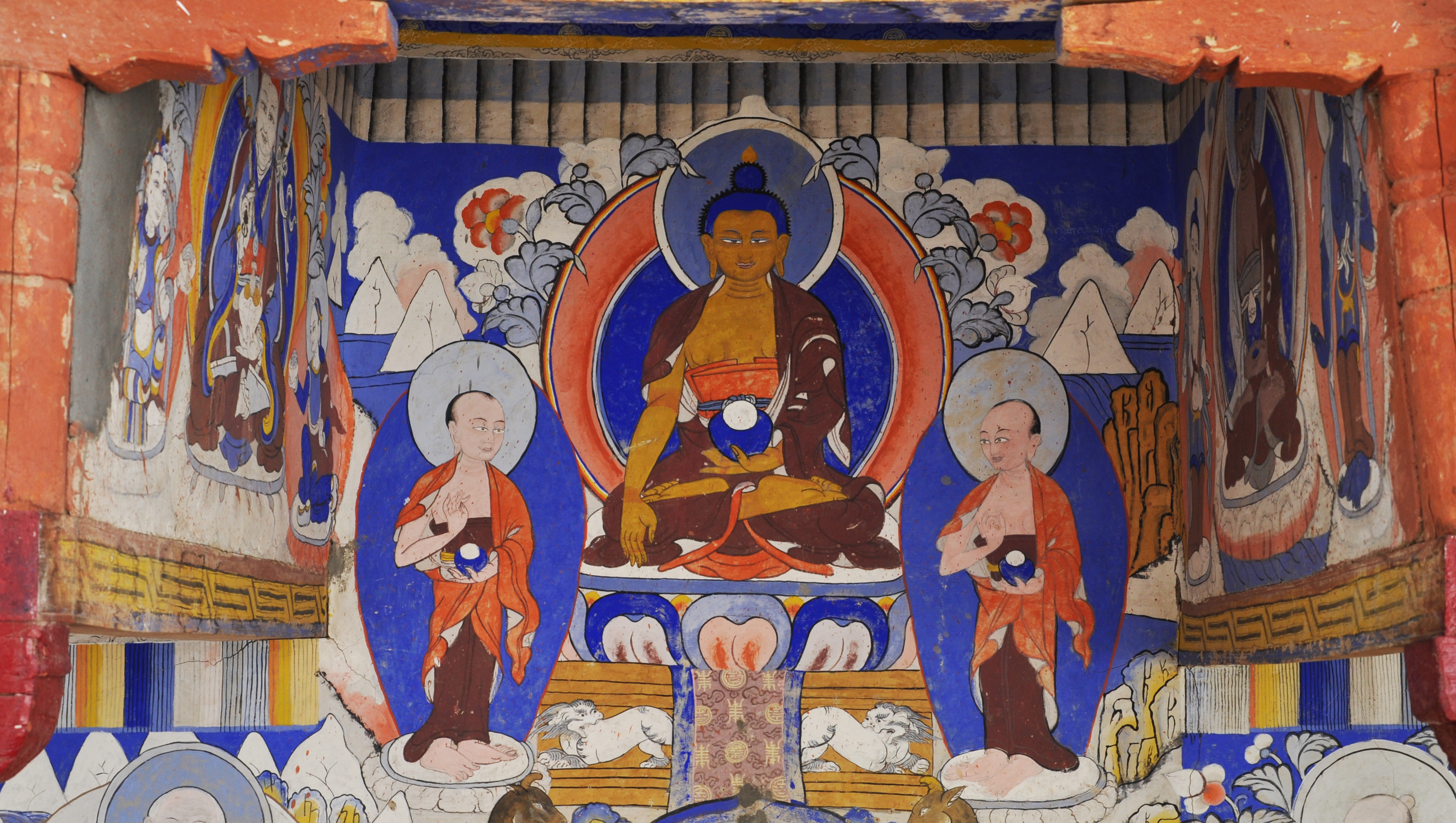
The Buddha and disciples in the Tak Thog Gompa

Tara is a female bodhisattva associated with compassion and swift assistance. She is depicted with one leg extended, ready to spring into action to aid sentient beings, and the other leg folded in a meditative position. Tara is often depicted with a green complexion, although she can also appear in white, red, or other colors; each represents a different aspect of her enlightenment. She has multiple arms, which symbolize her ability to engage in compassionate activities. Each of her hands holds a symbolic object or makes a unique gesture (mudra). Tara has 21 forms, each with a different colour and characteristics.

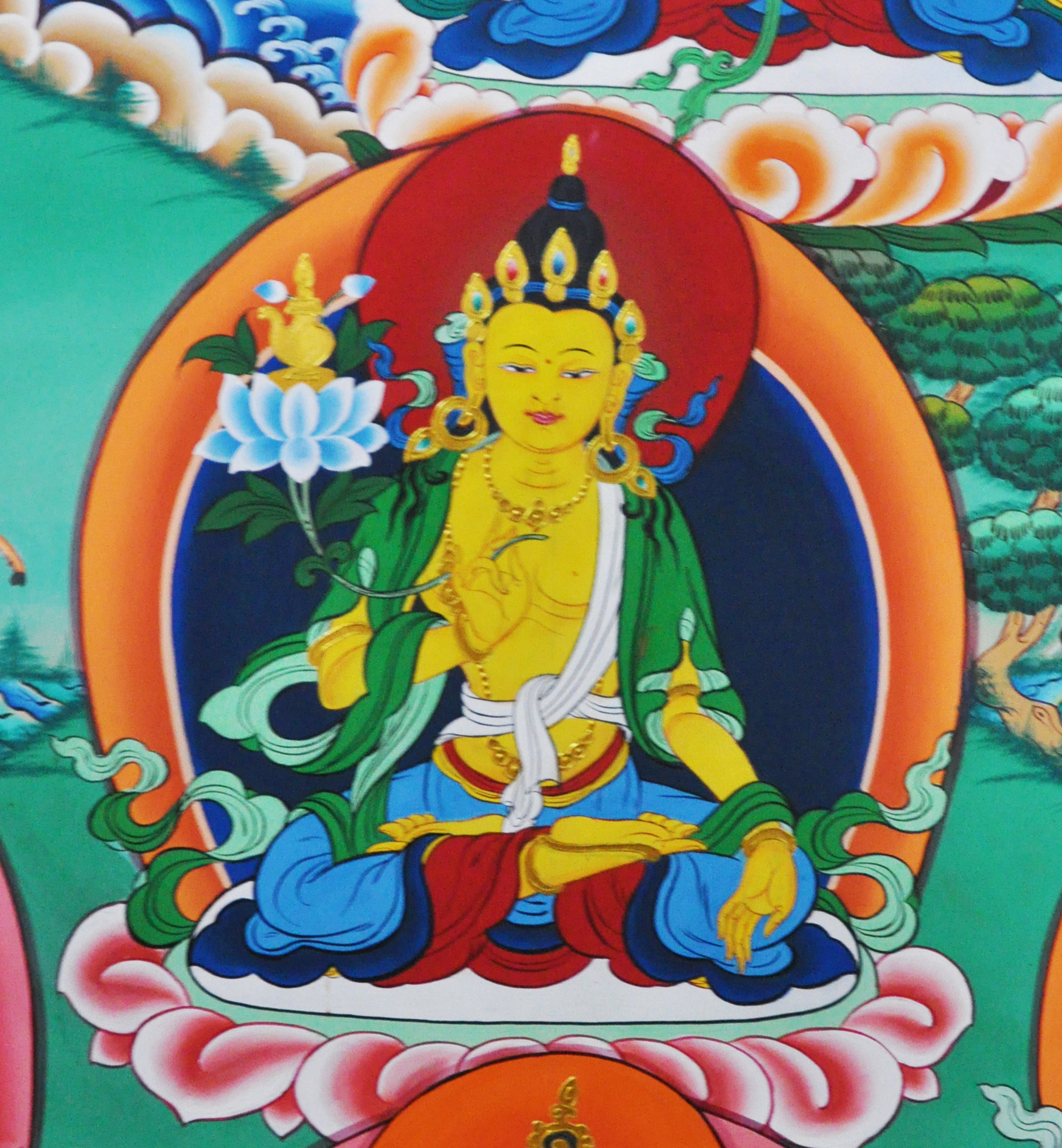
Yellow Tara

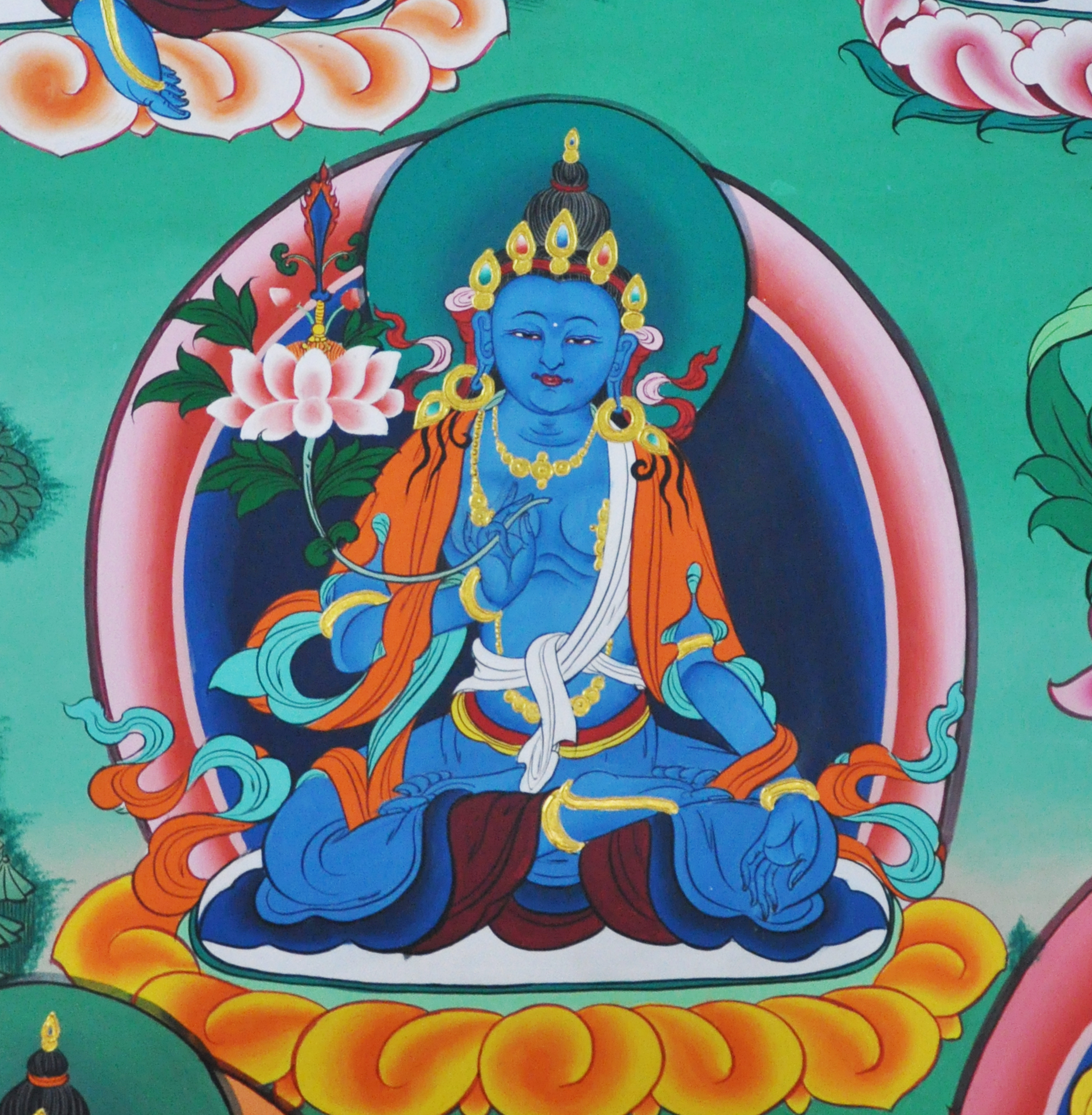
Blue Tara

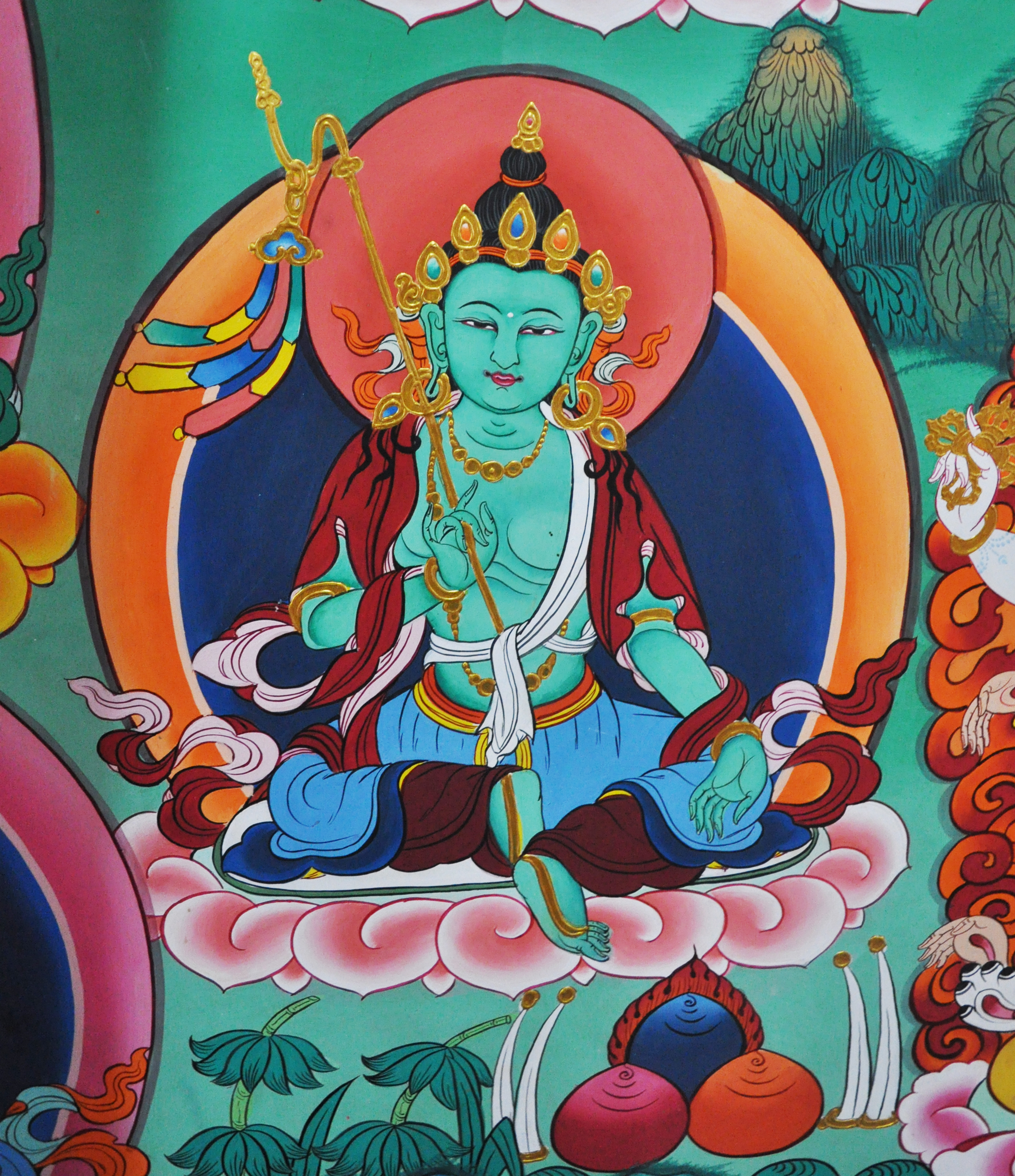
Green Tara

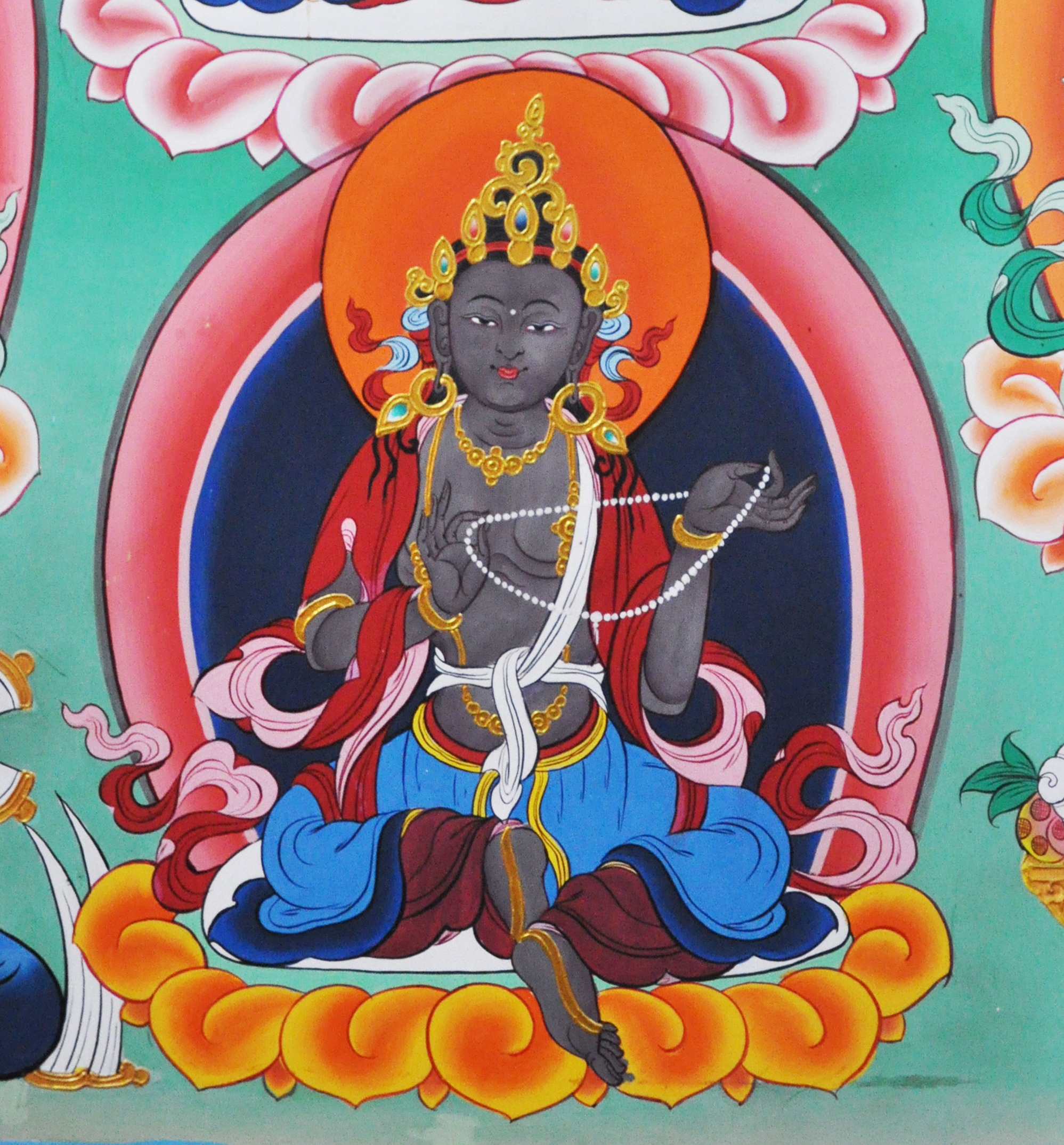
Black Tara

The Medicine Buddha, also known as Bhaisajyaguru, is a celestial Buddha associated with healing and the alleviation of suffering. He is often depicted in a deep-blue colour, holding a bowl of healing nectar.

=== Wrathful deities ===
Mahakala, also known as the Great Black One, is a powerful deity associated with protection, overcoming obstacles, and the removal of negative forces. He is often pictured with a dark-blue or black complexion, adorned with a crown of skulls, and wearing a necklace of severed heads.

Yamantaka, also known as the Destroyer of Death, is a wrathful manifestation of Manjushri, the bodhisattva of wisdom. He is pictured with a fearsome appearance, often with multiple heads, arms, and legs.

Wrathful deities (dharmapalas) are protectors and revered in various schools of Tibetan Buddhism as powerful entities tasked with guarding the dharma and its practitioners, warding off evils. They are often depicted in wrathful forms, symbolizing their fierce commitment to protecting the teachings of the Buddha and assisting practitioners on their path to enlightenment.

Dharmapalas were also conceived for directions. Vajrayana conceived Kuvera (Namthose) of the north, Dhritarashtra (Yulkorsung) of the east, Virudhka (Phagchepo) of the south, and Virupaksha (Chenmigzang) of the west. These deities are associated with specific colours and characteristics. They are associated with non-human forms, making them aggressive protectors.

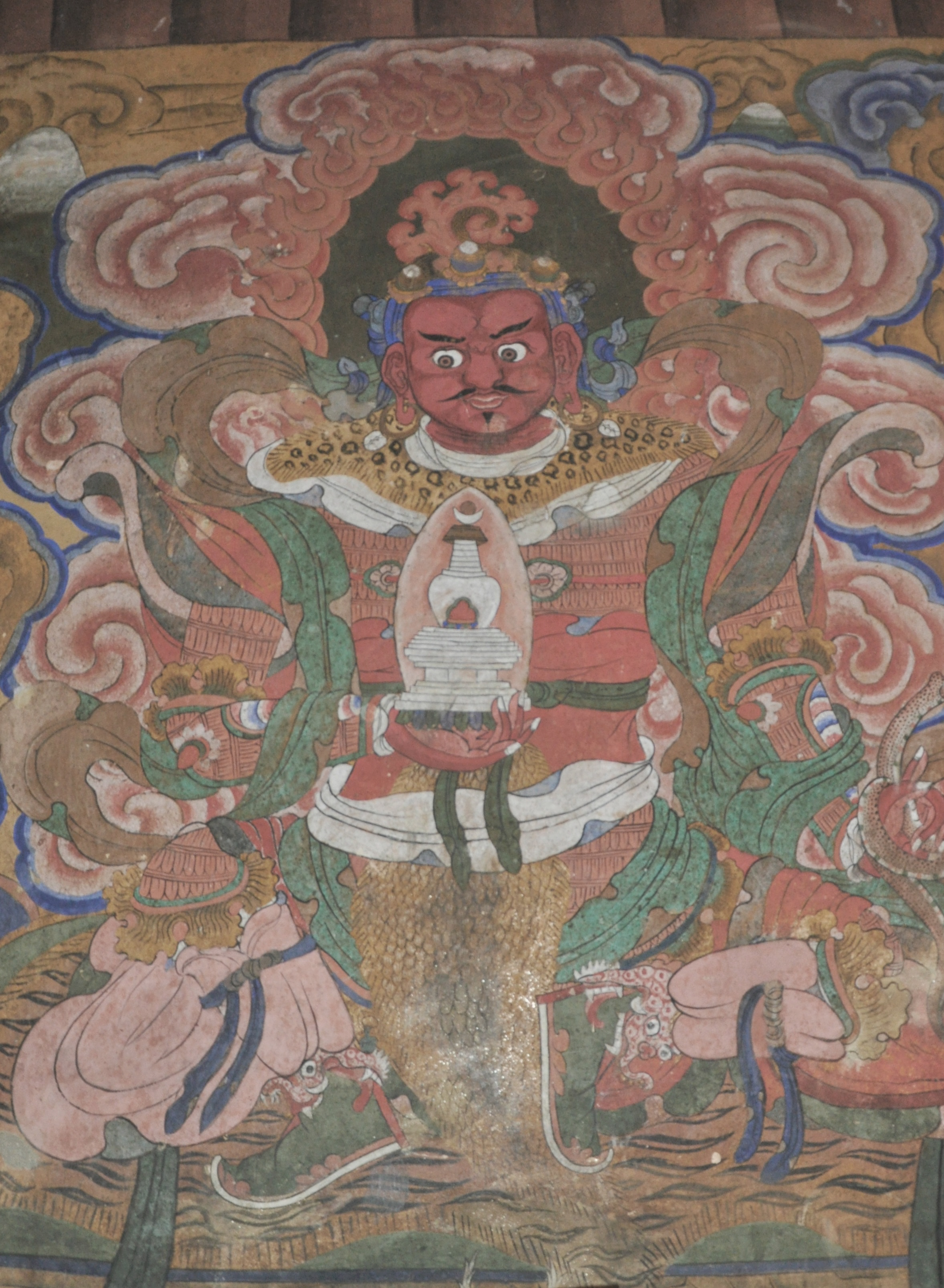
Virupaksha (west)

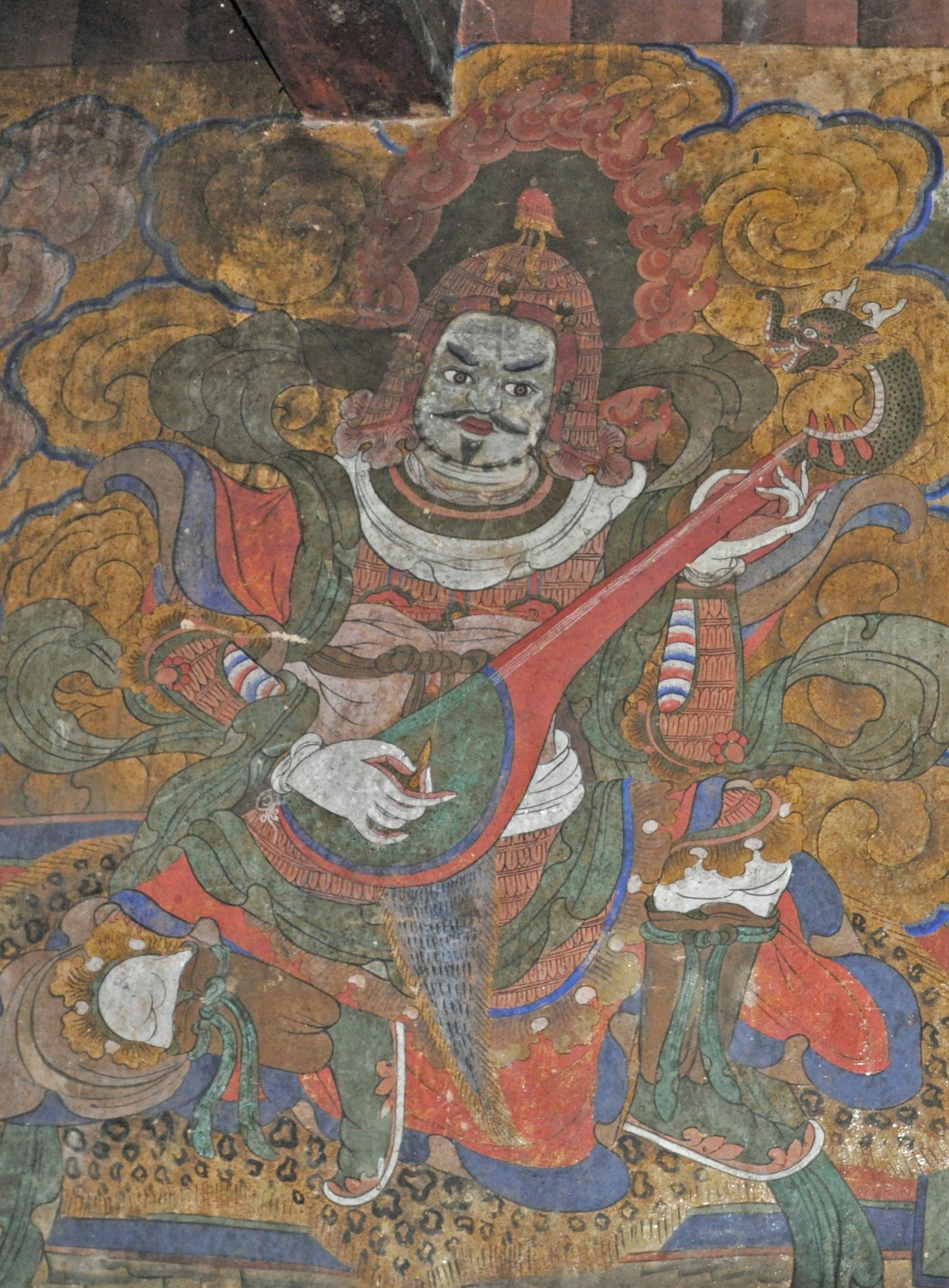
Dhritarashtra (east)

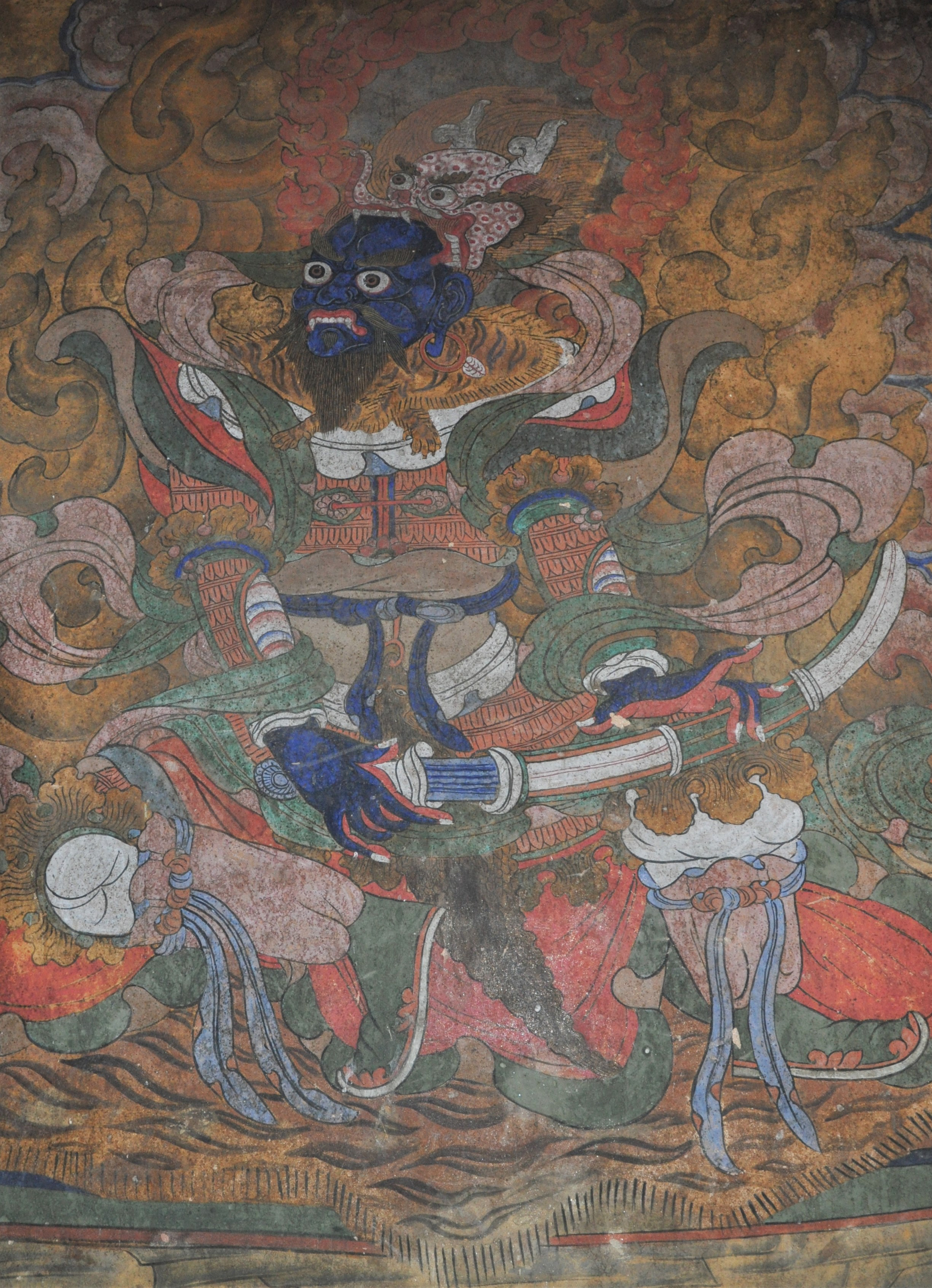
Virudhaka (south)

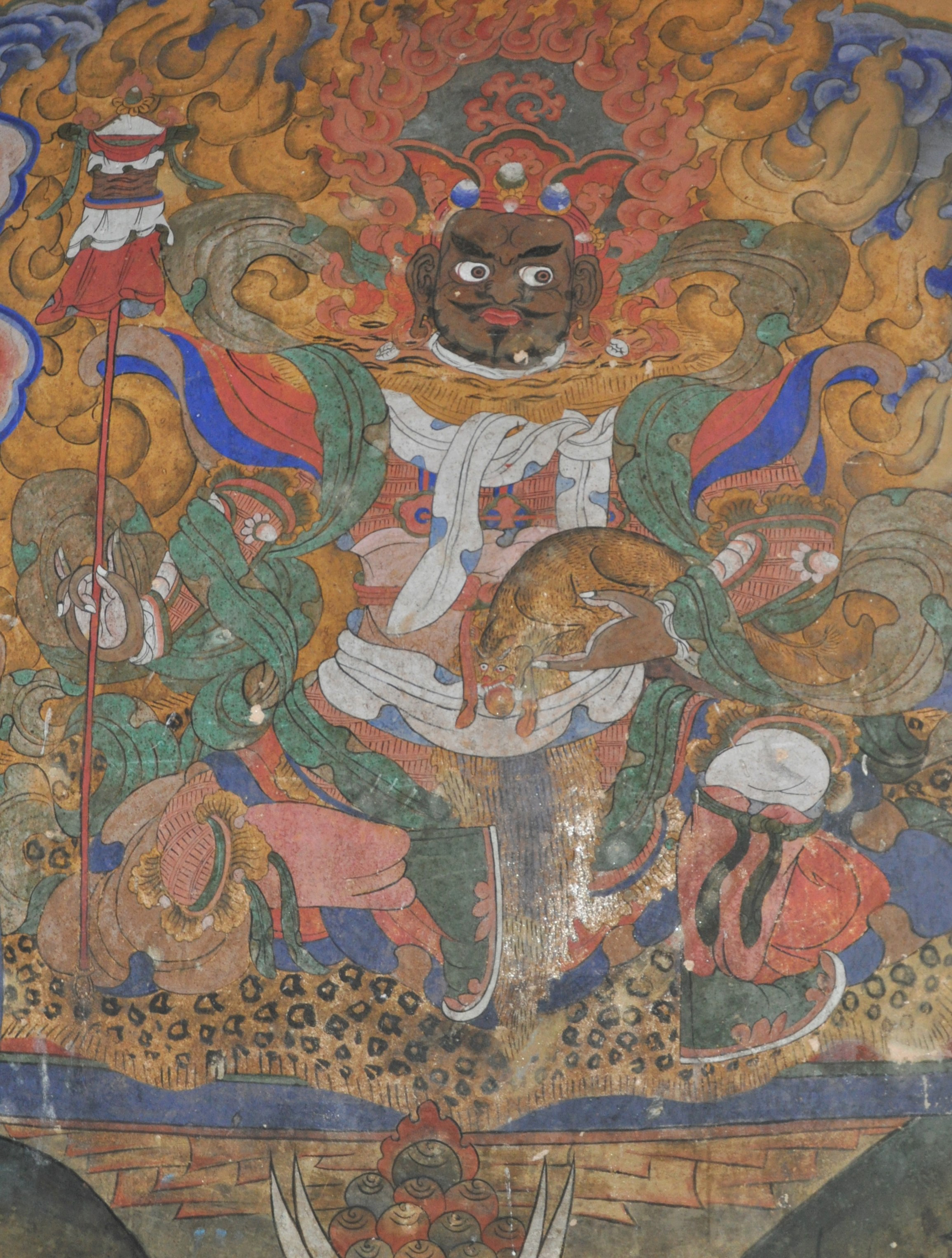
Vaisravana (north)

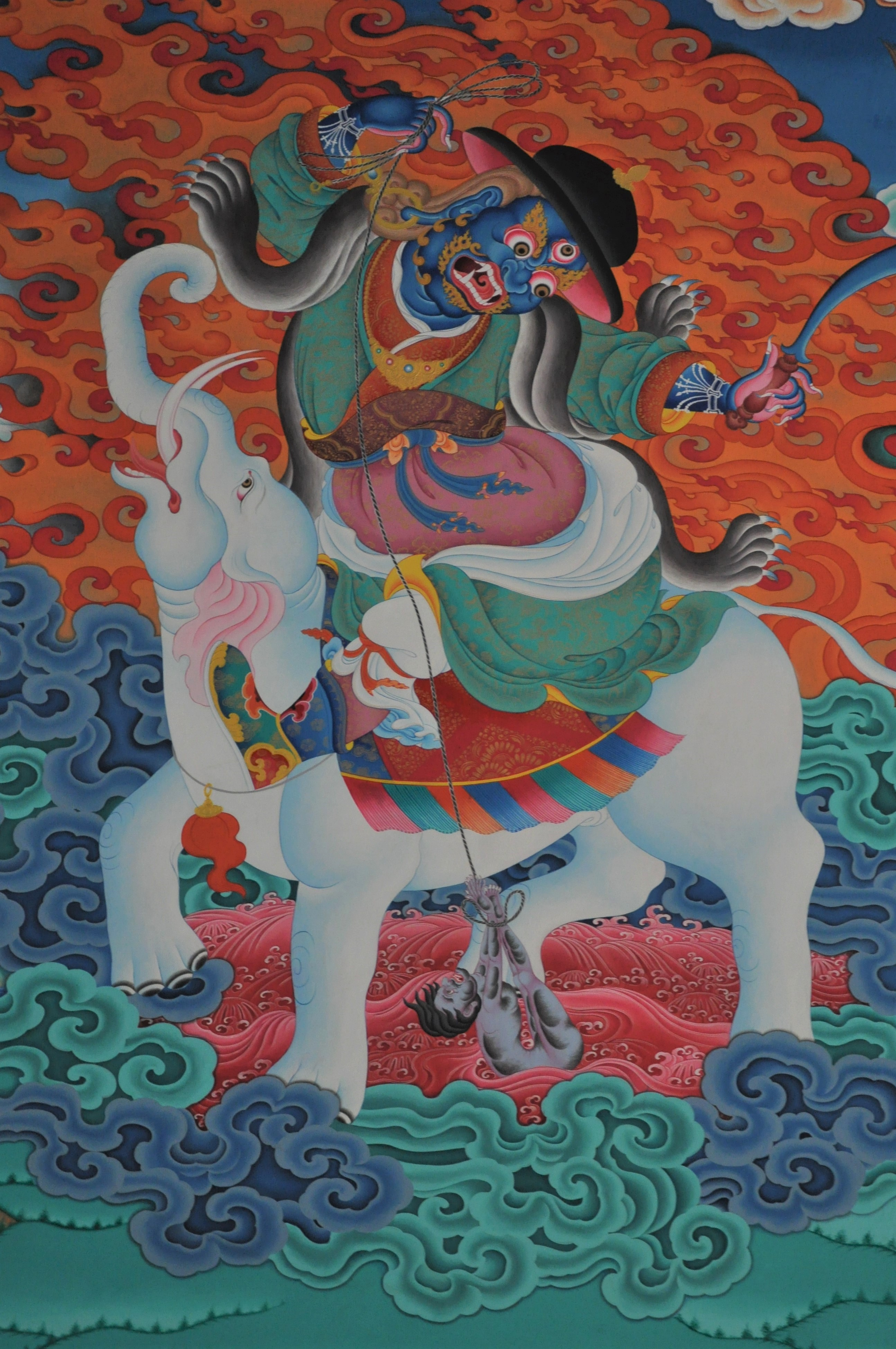
Dorje Legpa in Kungri Monastery

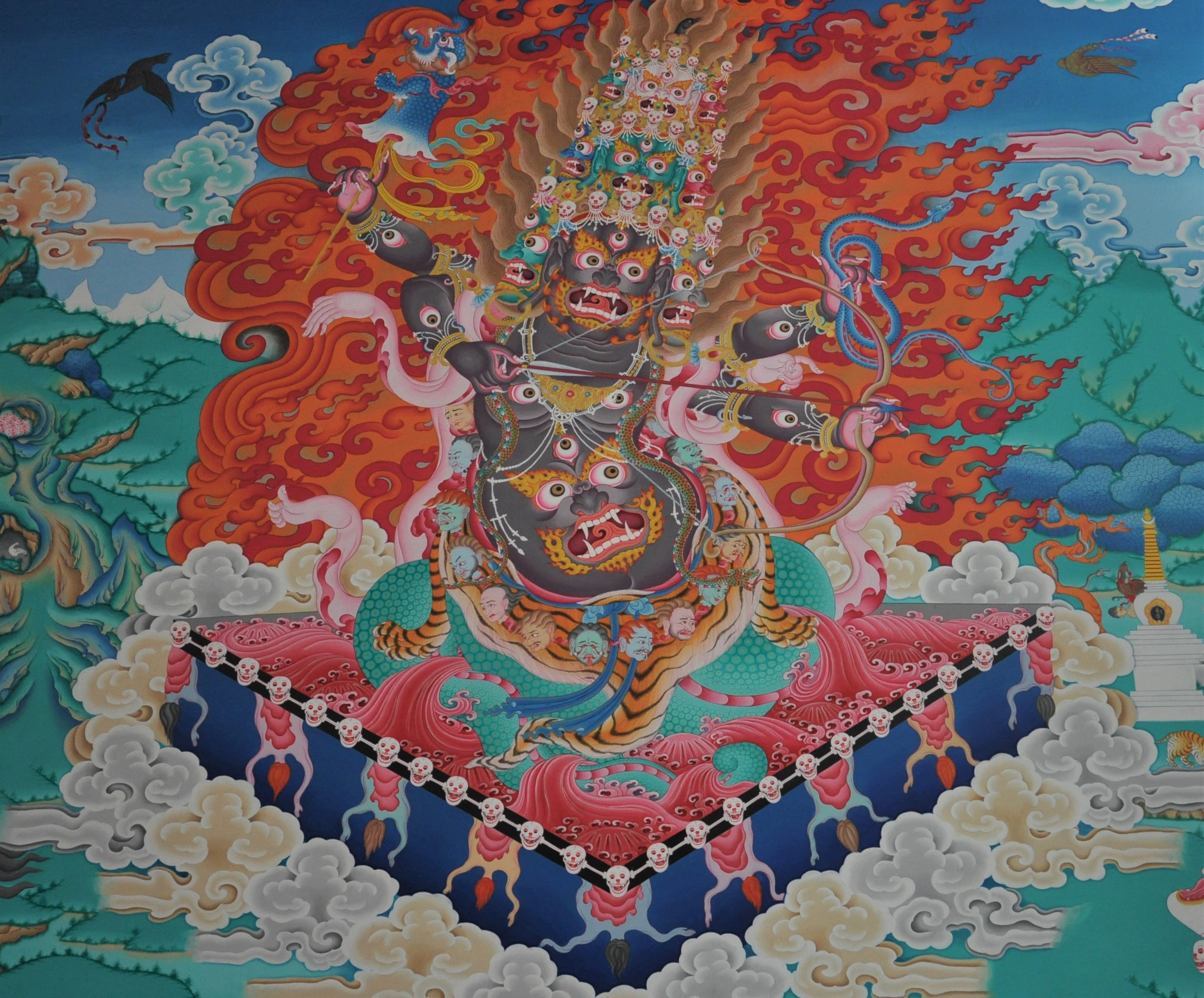
Raula at Kungri Rahula

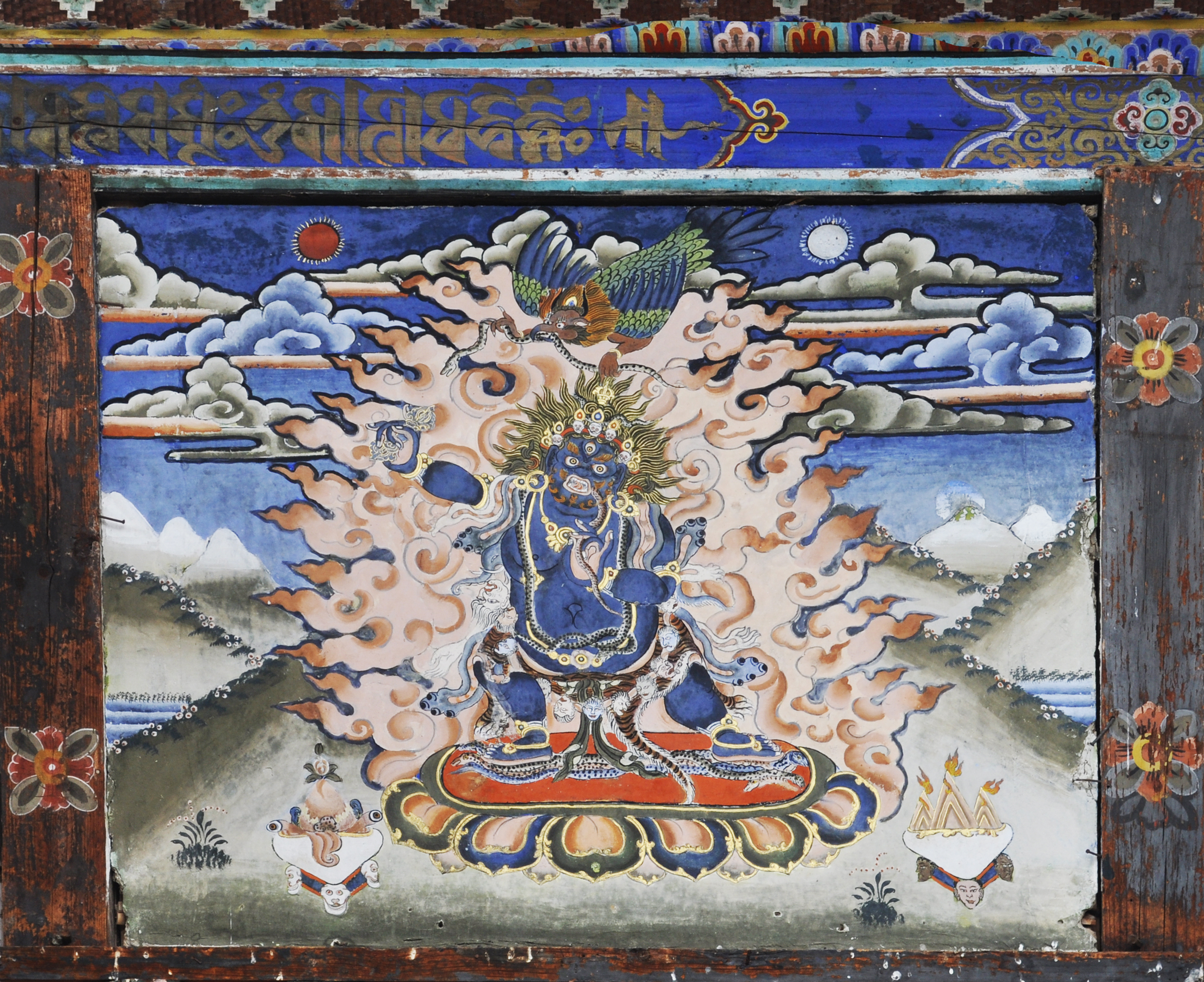
Vajrapani at Tamzhing Lahkang, Bhutan

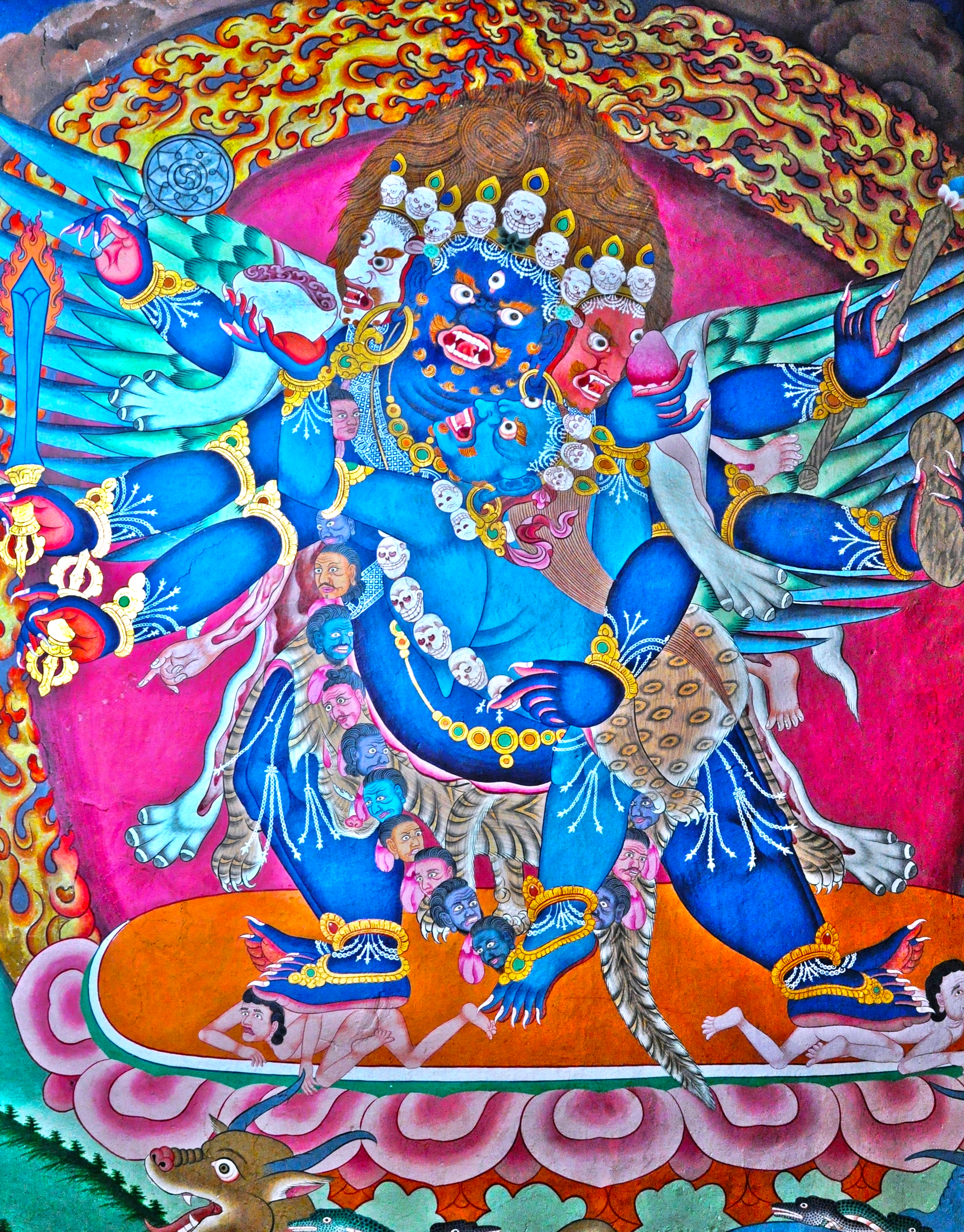
Vajrakila in Hemis Monastery

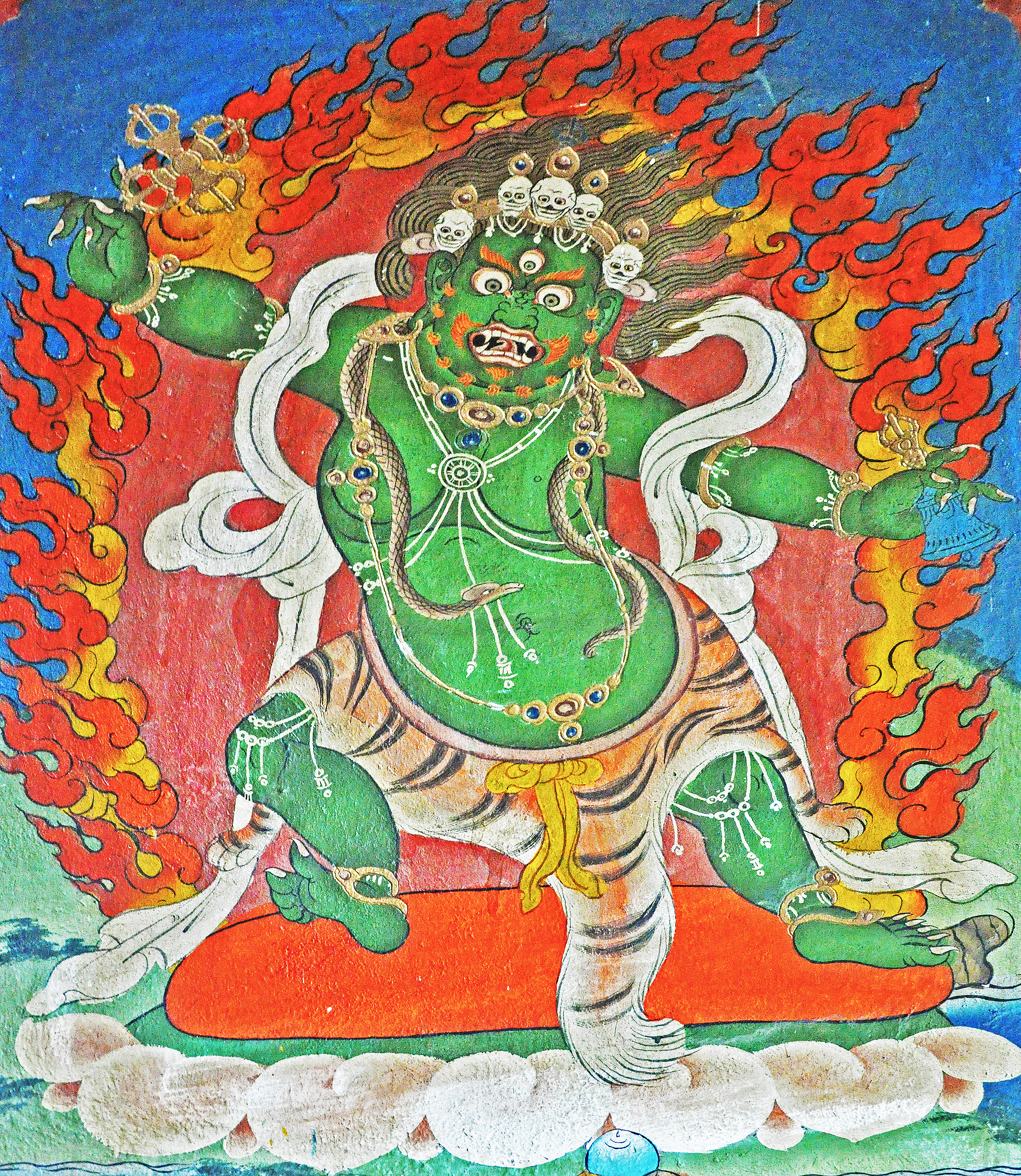
Vajra Vidharana

=== Dakinis ===
Dakinis are female celestial beings associated with wisdom, spiritual guidance, and transformation. They are depicted in various forms, often dancing or flying in dynamic poses. In Tibetan Buddhism, dakinis are associated with specific practices, qualities, and functions.

Vajrayogini
Often depicted in a wrathful form, she is associated with chöd and is considered a fierce emanation of enlightened wisdom.
Kurukulle
Known as the Red Tara, she is associated with magnetizing activities, enchantment, and subjugating obstacles. Kurukulle is often invoked for love and relationship practices.
Tara
Often considered a bodhisattva, certain forms of Tara are also revered as dakinis; green Tara, in particular, is widely venerated for her compassion and swift assistance.
Simhamukha
Associated with the lion-headed wisdom deity, she is often invoked for protection and removing obstacles.
Nairatmya
Also known as the Selfless One, Nairatmya is a wisdom dakini who represents the emptiness of reality. She is associated with the Chakrasamvara Tantra.
Troma Nagmo (Wrathful Black Varahi)
A wrathful emanation of Vajravarahi, associated with chöd and dissolution of the ego.
Vajravārāhī
Also known as the Diamond Sow, she is associated with the transformative power of compassion and is often linked with the Chakrasamvara Tantra.
Machig Labdrön
An historical figure and a revered teacher, she is the founder of chöd and is associated with compassionate activities.
Dorje Shugden
She is depicted as a wrathful deity, riding a snow lion and holding a sword and a wish-fulfilling jewel.
Palden Lhamo
A fierce protector and the only female of the eight major dharmapalas, she is widely revered across the schools of Tibetan Buddhism and is considered the principal protector of Tibet. Palden Lhamo is typically depicted riding a mule with a mane of flaming hair over a sea of blood, symbolizing her unwavering commitment to protecting the dharma.
Ekajati (Ralchigma)
Protector of Dzogchen who is known for her single eye, single tooth, and single breast, Ekajati is a powerful guardian against distractions and breaches of tantric commitments.
Tsiu Marpo
Originally a worldly god who was subjugated by Padmasambhava and is a protector of the teachings, she is particularly associated with the Nyingma school.
Setrap
A protector associated with the Gelug school, Setrap is an emanation of Amitabha and is often depicted in a wrathful aspect, riding a red horse.
Gyalpo Sum
A group of four protector deities who were bound by Padmasambhava to protect the dharma. They include spirits of the cardinal directions, and are often invoked together.

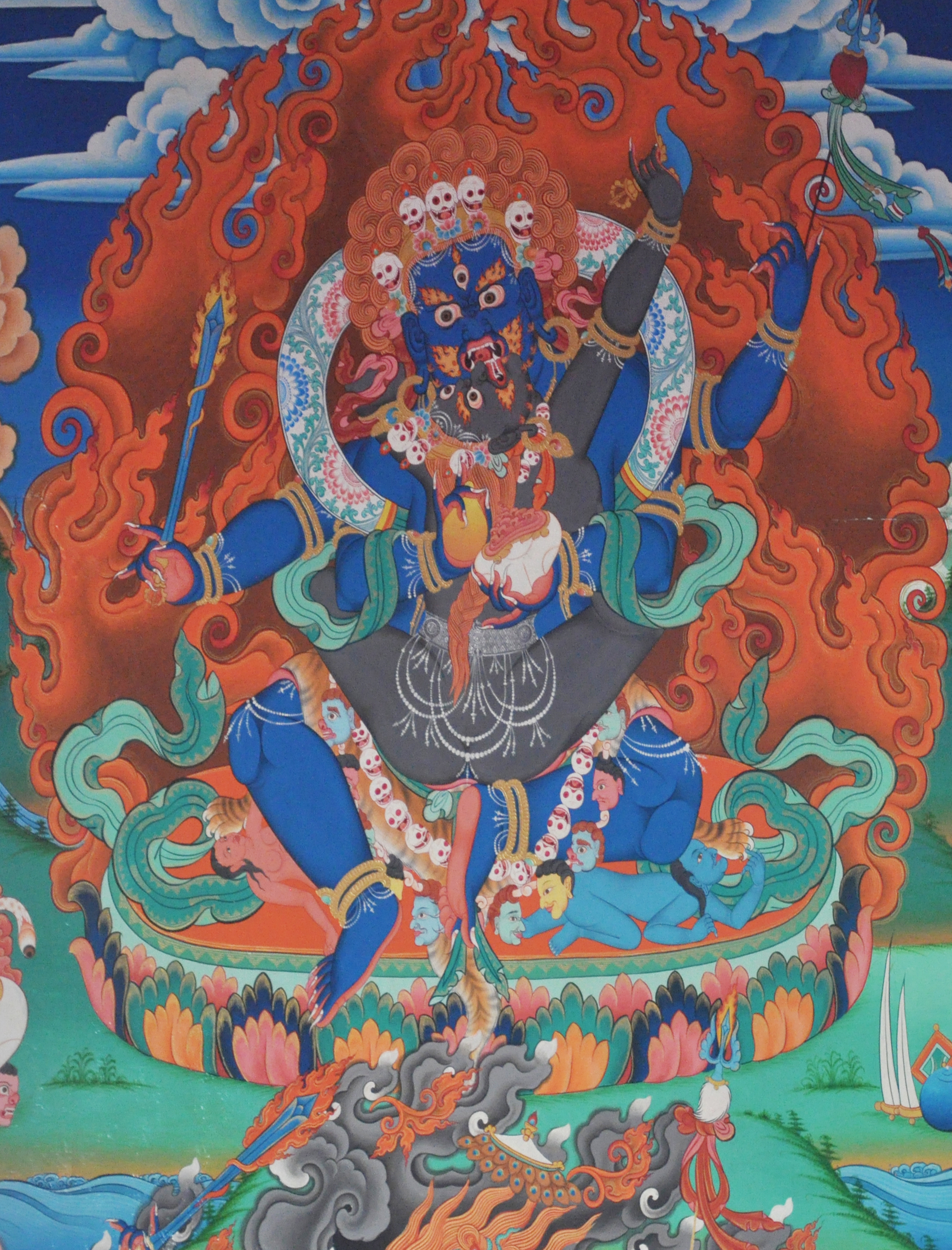
Nagpo Champo

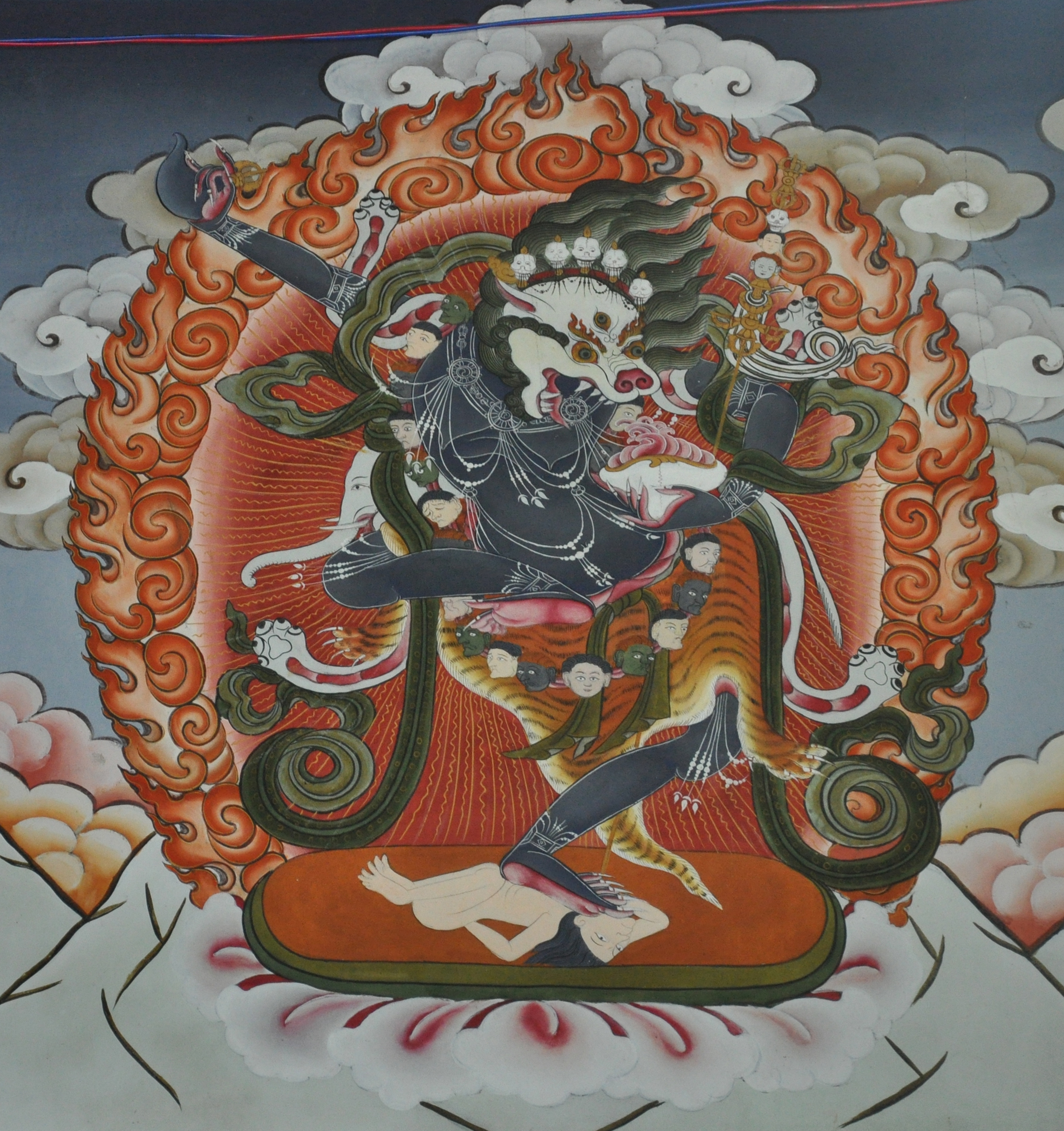
Senge-dongma

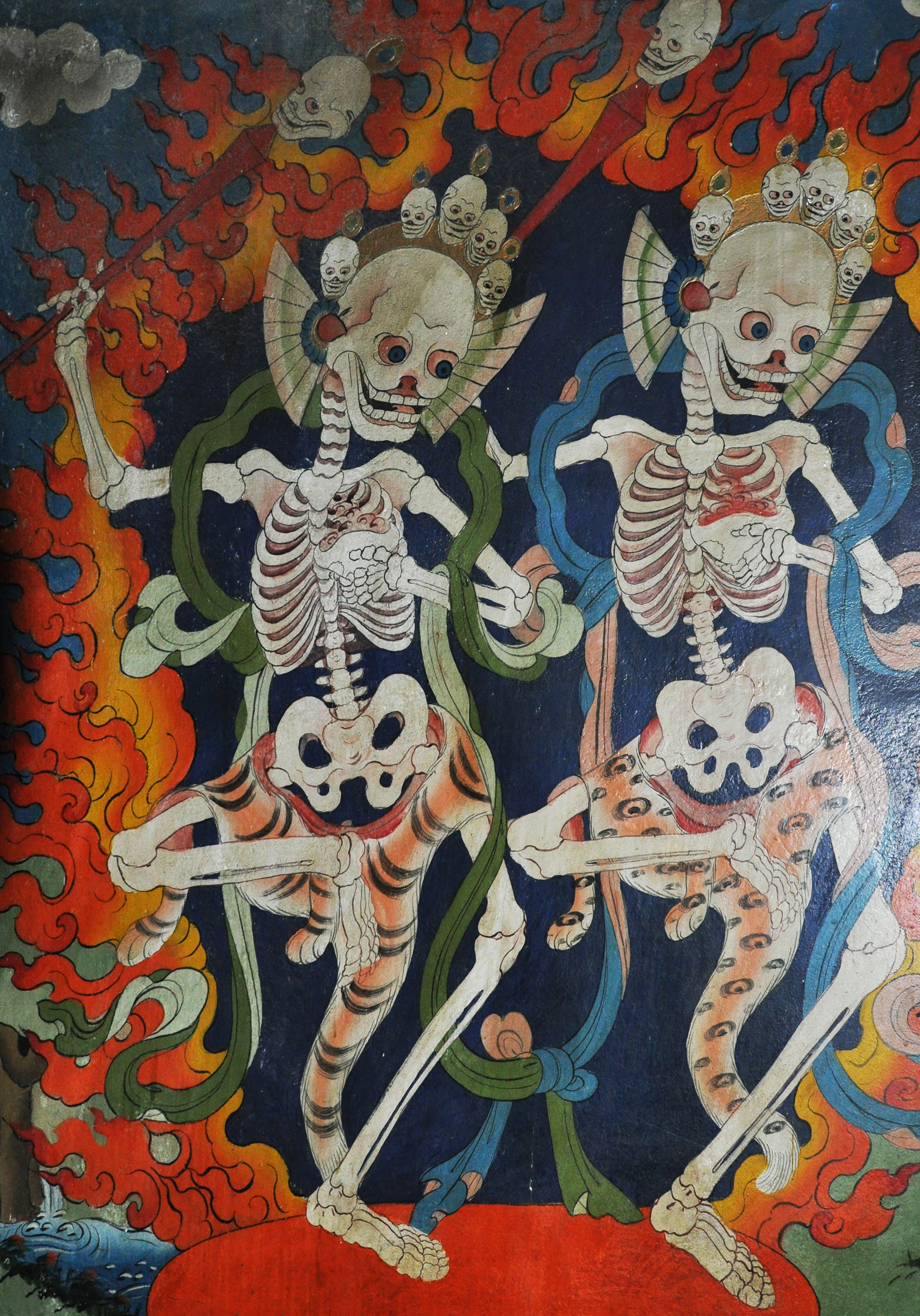
Citipati - Guardian of Charnnel ground

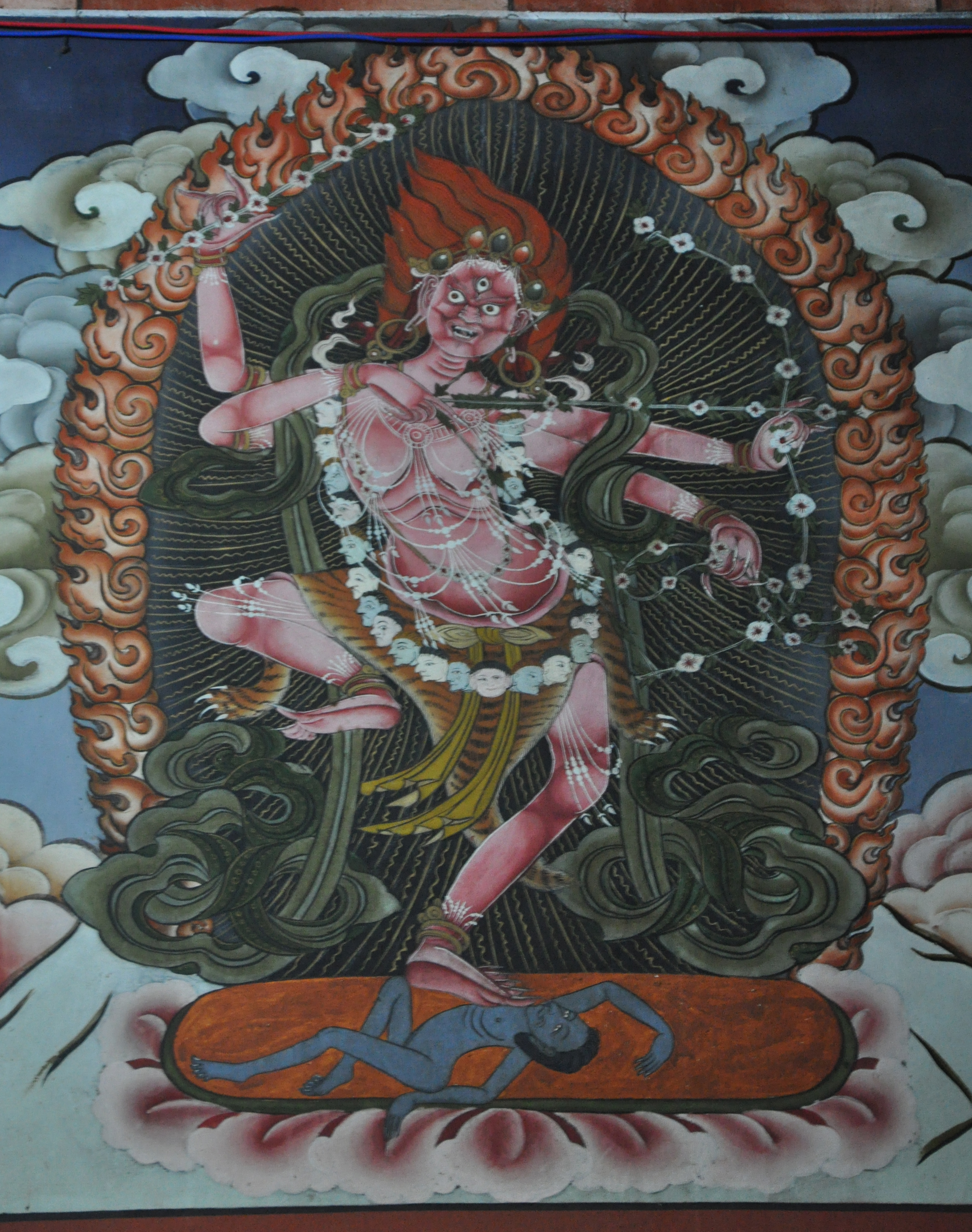
Dakini- Kurukulla Yogini

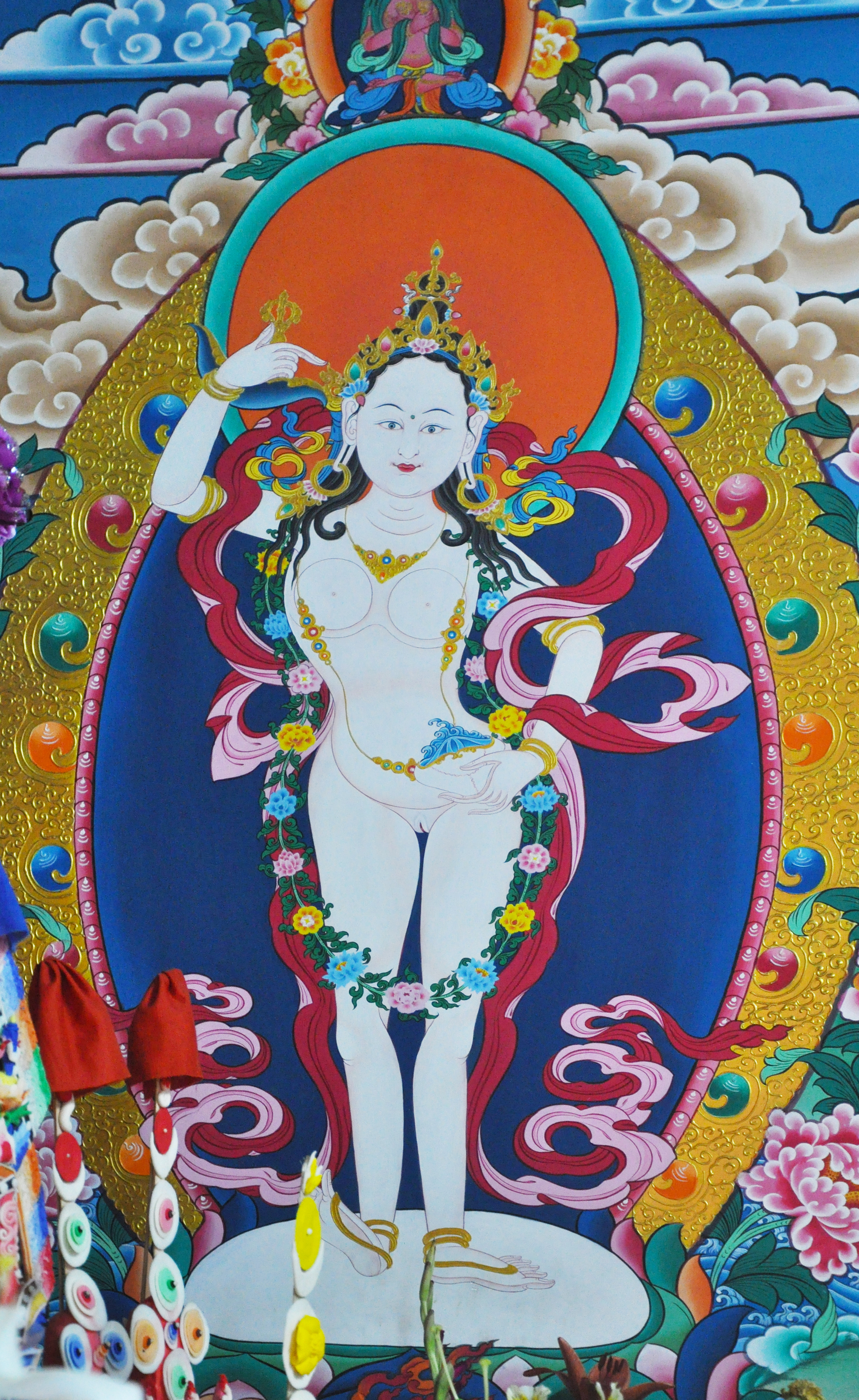
White Tara-Eshe Tsogyal

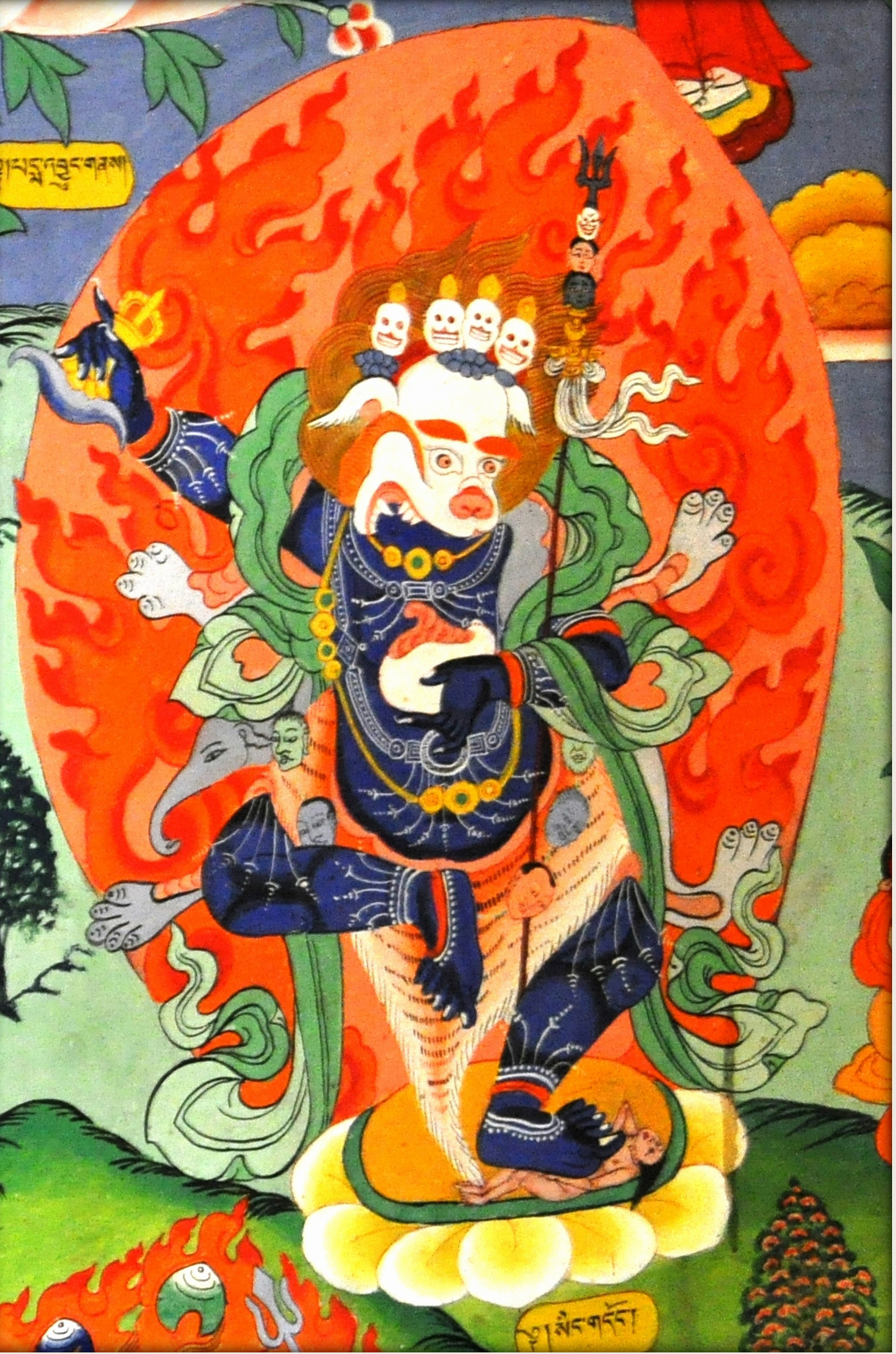
Simhamukha- Senge Dongma (Tibetan)

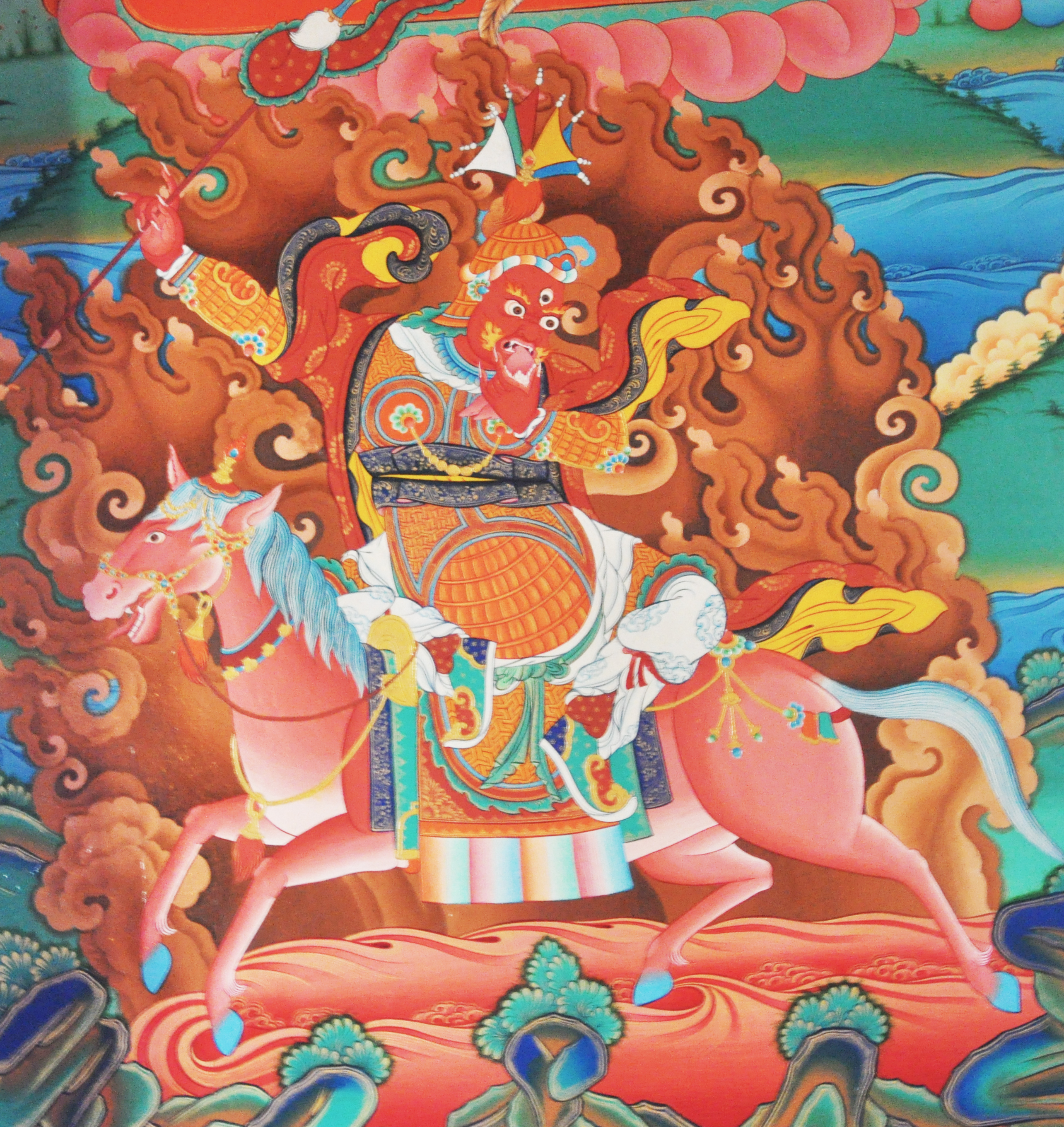
Palden Lahmo

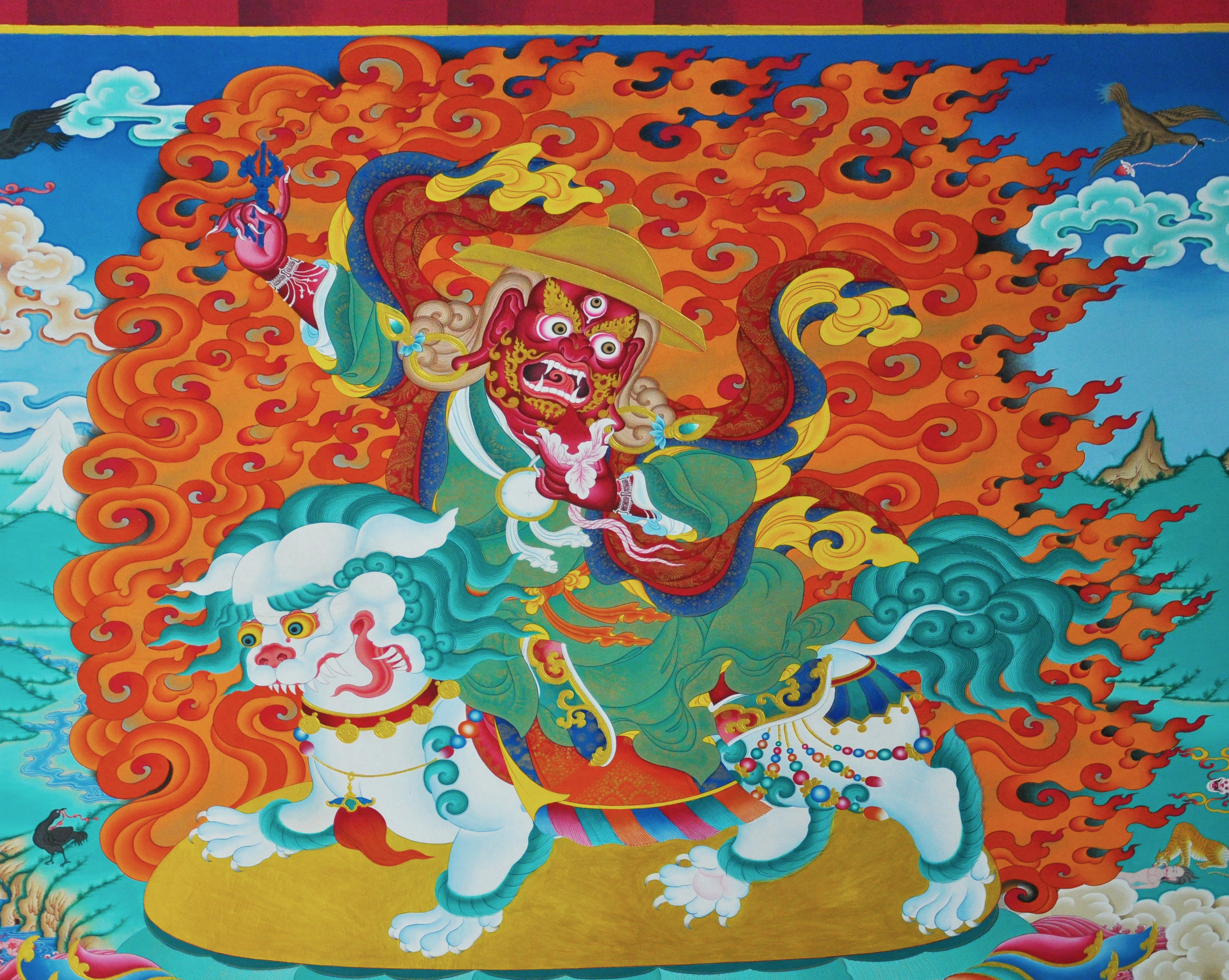
Dorze Shugden

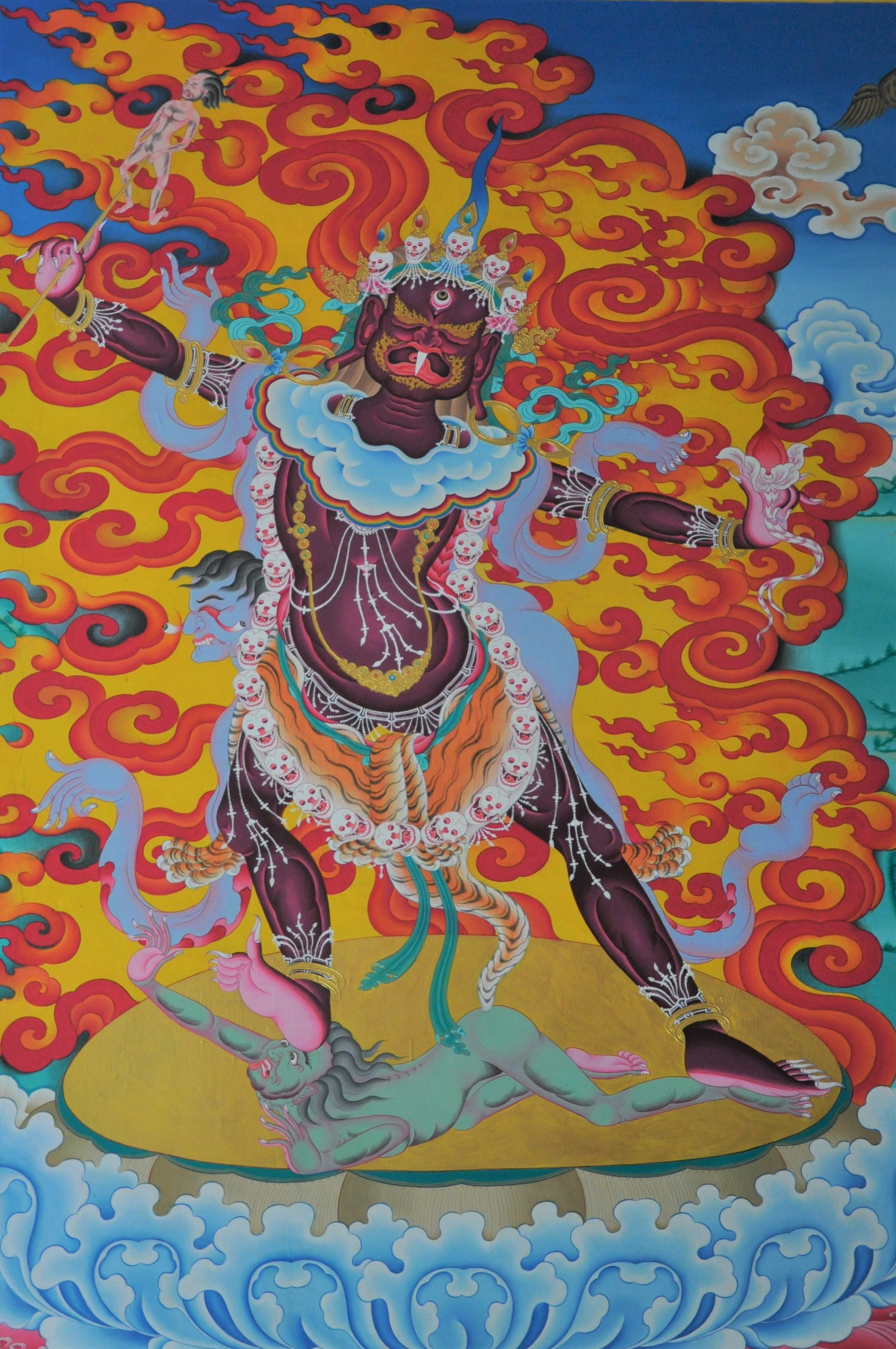
Ekajati

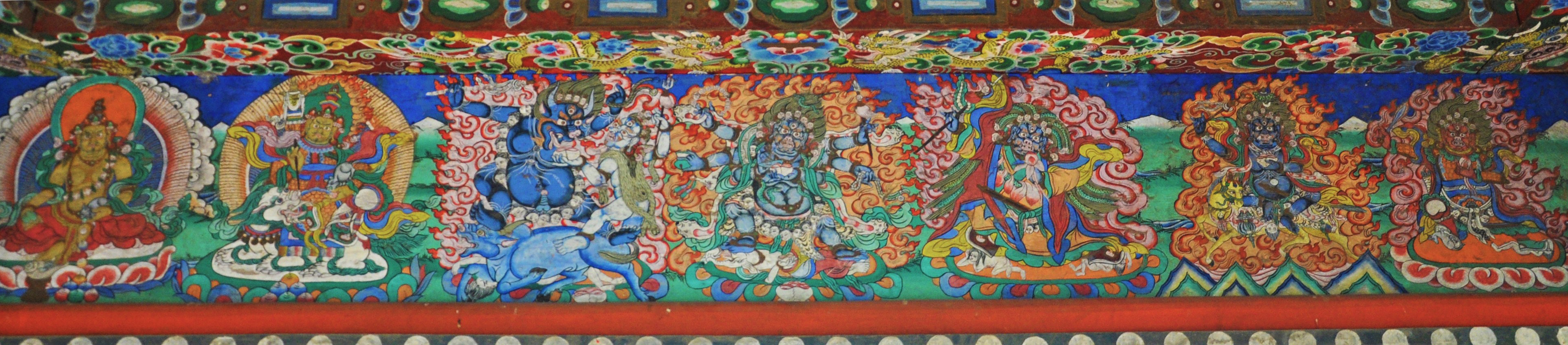
Vajrayana Deities of Protection - Kalachakra Gompa India

The dakini pantheon is extensive, and their names and qualities vary across Tibetan Buddhist traditions and lineages. Dakinis play diverse roles, embodying wisdom, compassion, and transformative energy to guide practitioners on the path to enlightenment.

==== Mandalas ====
Mandalas are intricate geometric designs that represent the universe and are sacred spaces for meditation and visualization. Mandalas, with their symbolism and multifaceted themes, offer a rich tapestry for meditation, reflection, and spiritual exploration. They remind practitioners of the complexity of the universe and our place within it, guiding them towards greater awareness and understanding.

They are often depicted in murals, showcasing the intricate detail and symbolism associated with tantric practices. Mandalas are used as tools for concentration, visualization, and spiritual transformation.

Cosmology and the universe
Many mandalas represent the structure of the universe and cosmic order. They can depict a world mountain at the center, surrounded by continents, oceans, and mountains, symbolizing the Buddhist or Hindu cosmos.
Sacred geometry
The geometric patterns in mandalas, such as circles, squares, and triangles, are symbolic and have specific meanings. Circles represent wholeness and unity; squares can symbolize the earthly realm, stability, and balance; triangles often stand for the trinity of deity, enlightenment and the universe, or elements like fire and water, depending on their orientation.
Embodiment of deities
In Vajrayana Buddhism, mandalas are often abodes for specific deities. Each section of the mandala houses different deities and symbols, representing the qualities and teachings associated with them. Practitioners use these mandalas to invoke the deities, embody their qualities, and receive blessings.
Nature and the environment
Some mandalas incorporate elements of nature such as flowers, animals, and celestial bodies, symbolizing the interconnection of all life forms and the natural world's sacredness.
Ritual mandalas
Focal points for meditation, guiding the practitioner into deeper states of awareness and concentration. The act of creating a mandala (especially a sand mandala) is considered a meditative and healing ritual, symbolizing impermanence and the cycle of life.
Healing mandalas
Certain mandalas are used for protection against evil spirits or negative energy. They are believed to have healing properties, promoting physical, emotional, and spiritual healing by harmonizing the environment and the individual's energy.

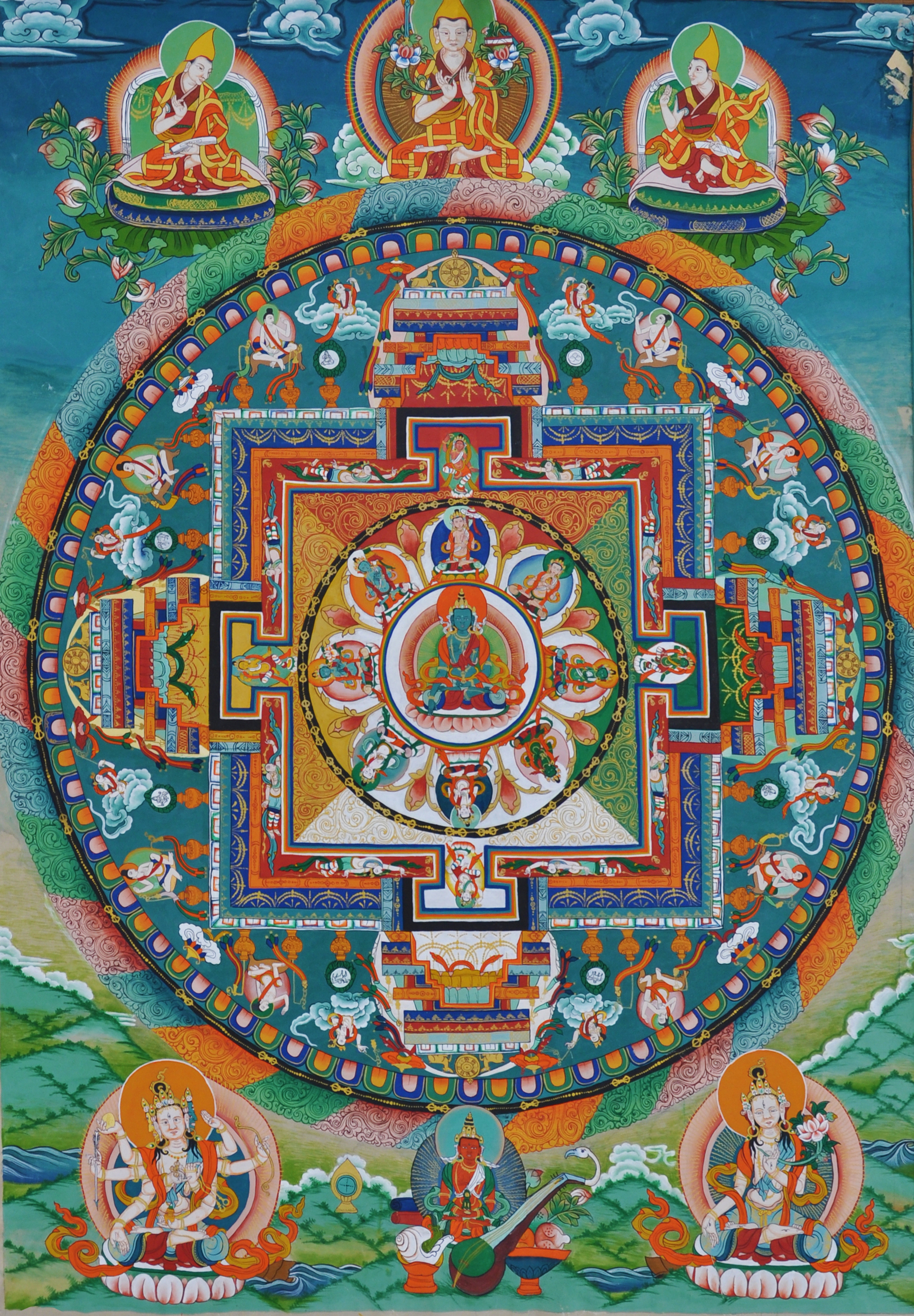
Akshyobhya mandala

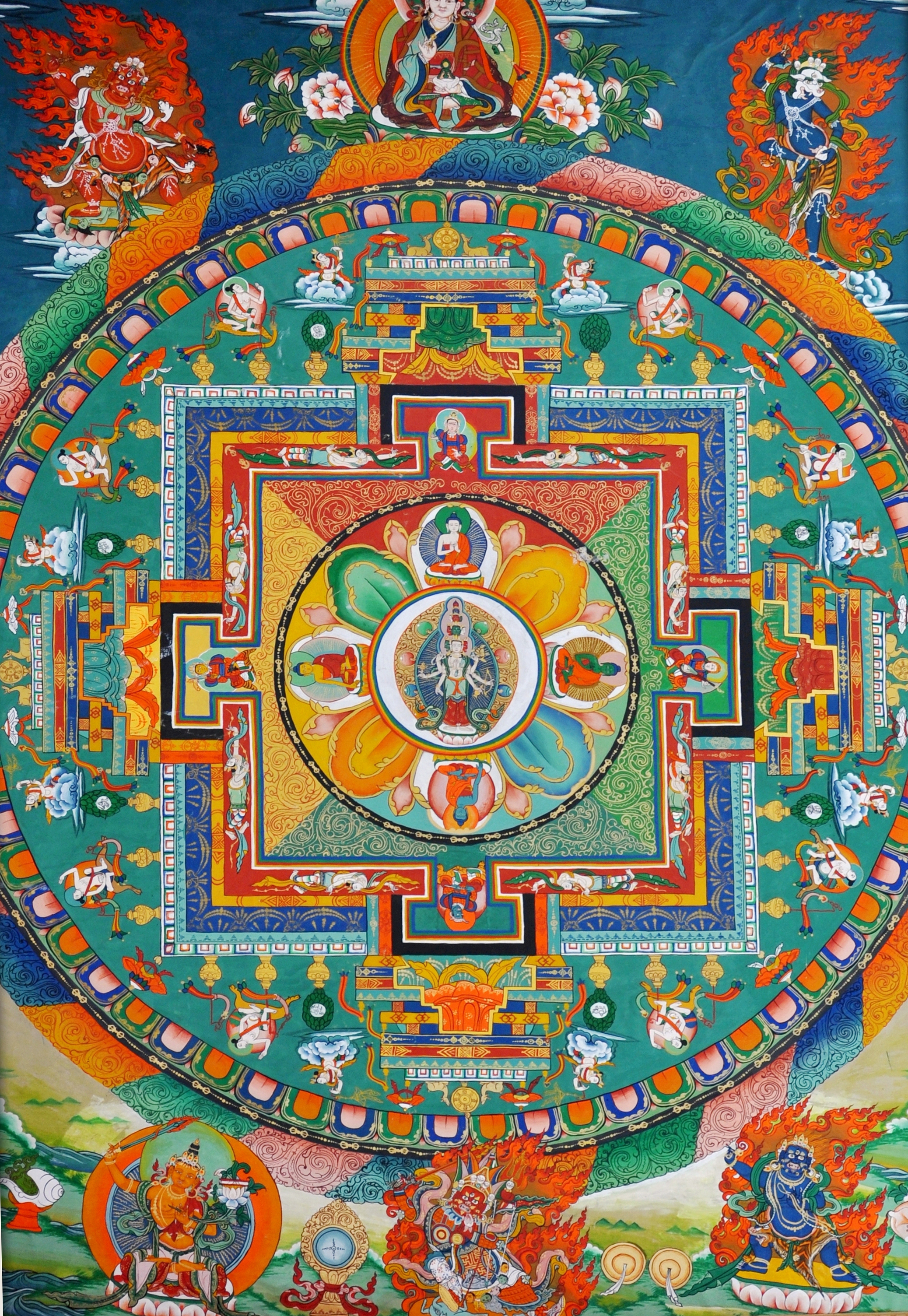
Chenrezig - Avalokiteshwara mandala

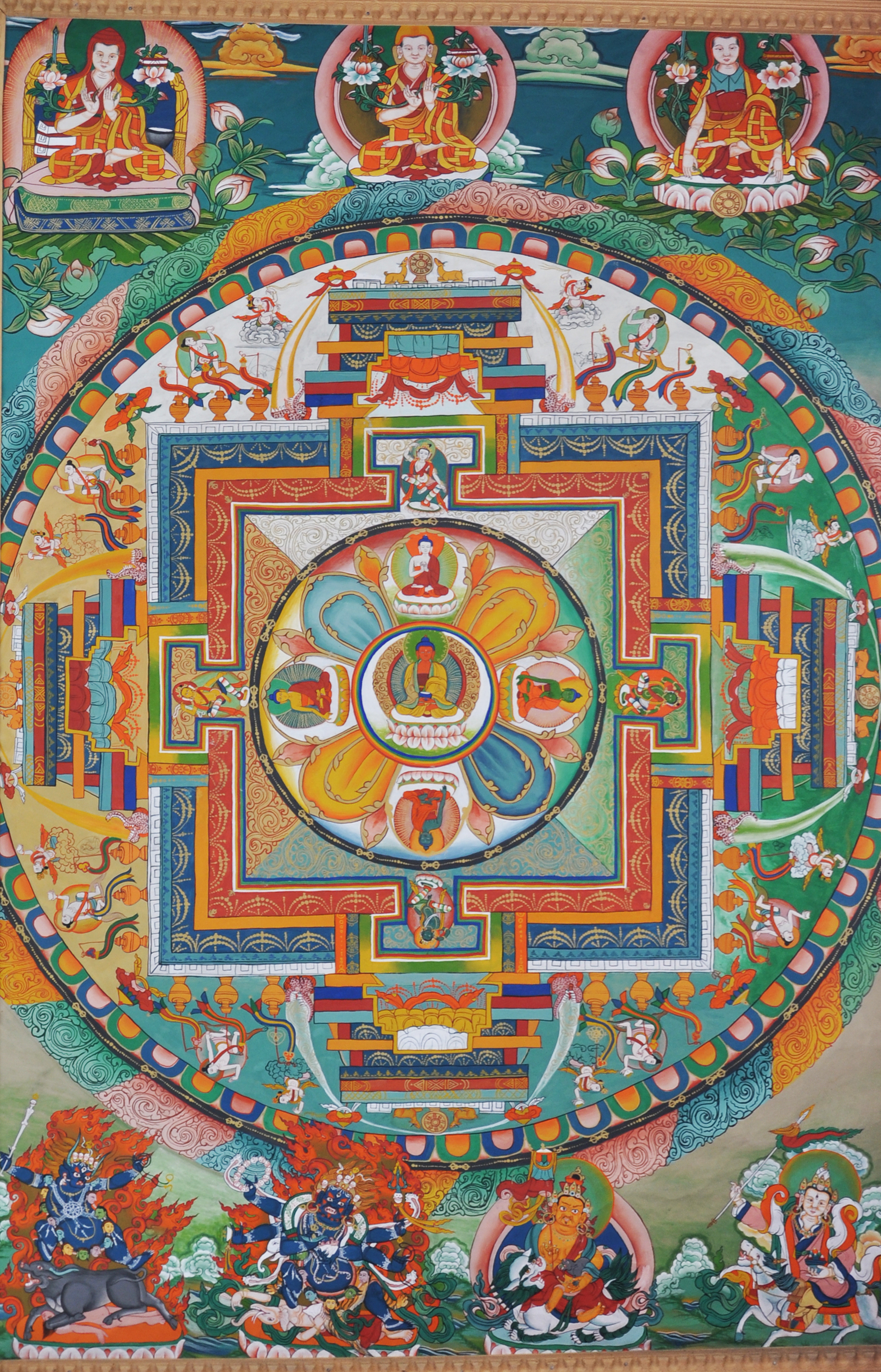
Opakme - Amitabha mandala

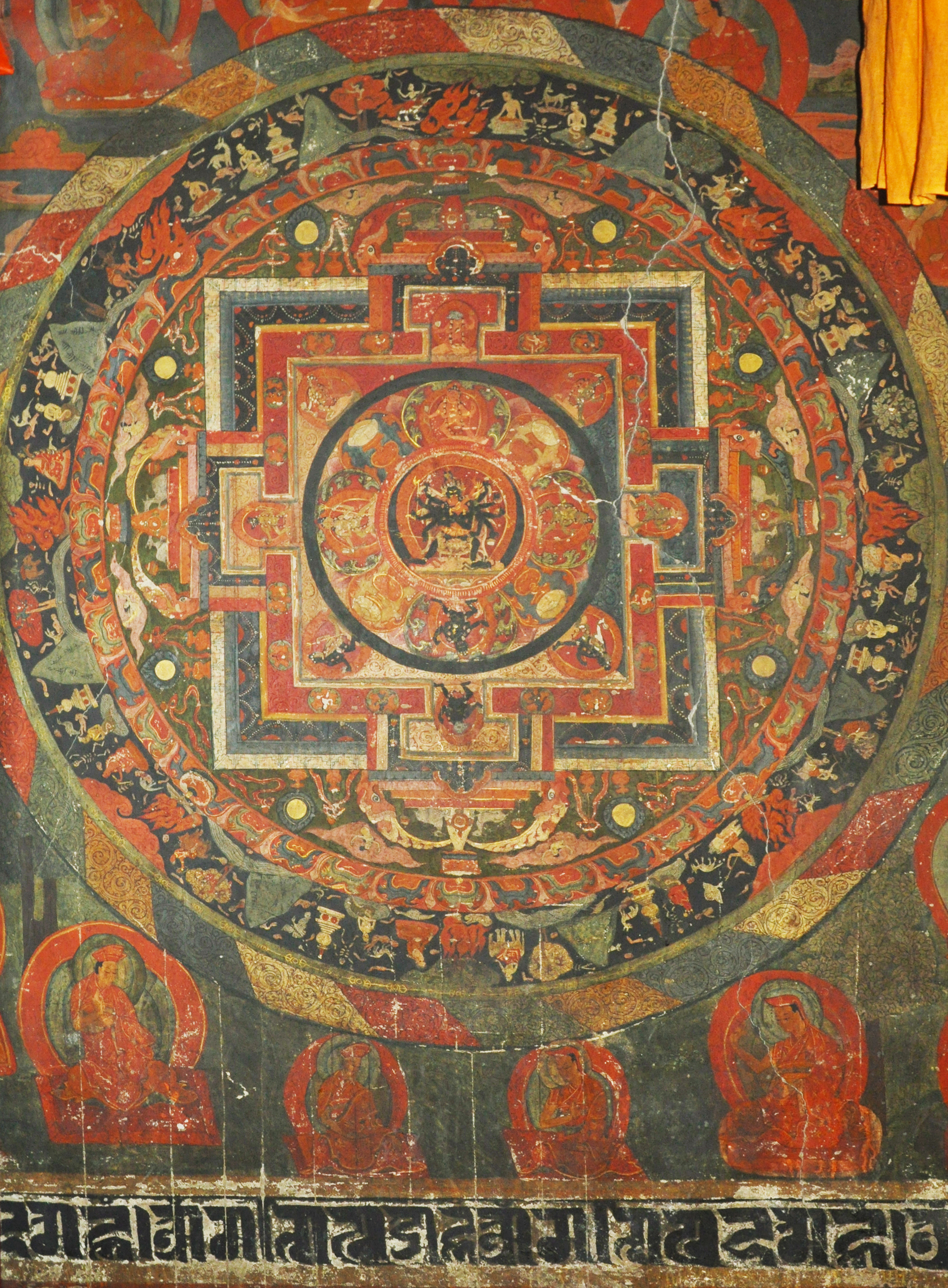
Chakrasamvara mandala

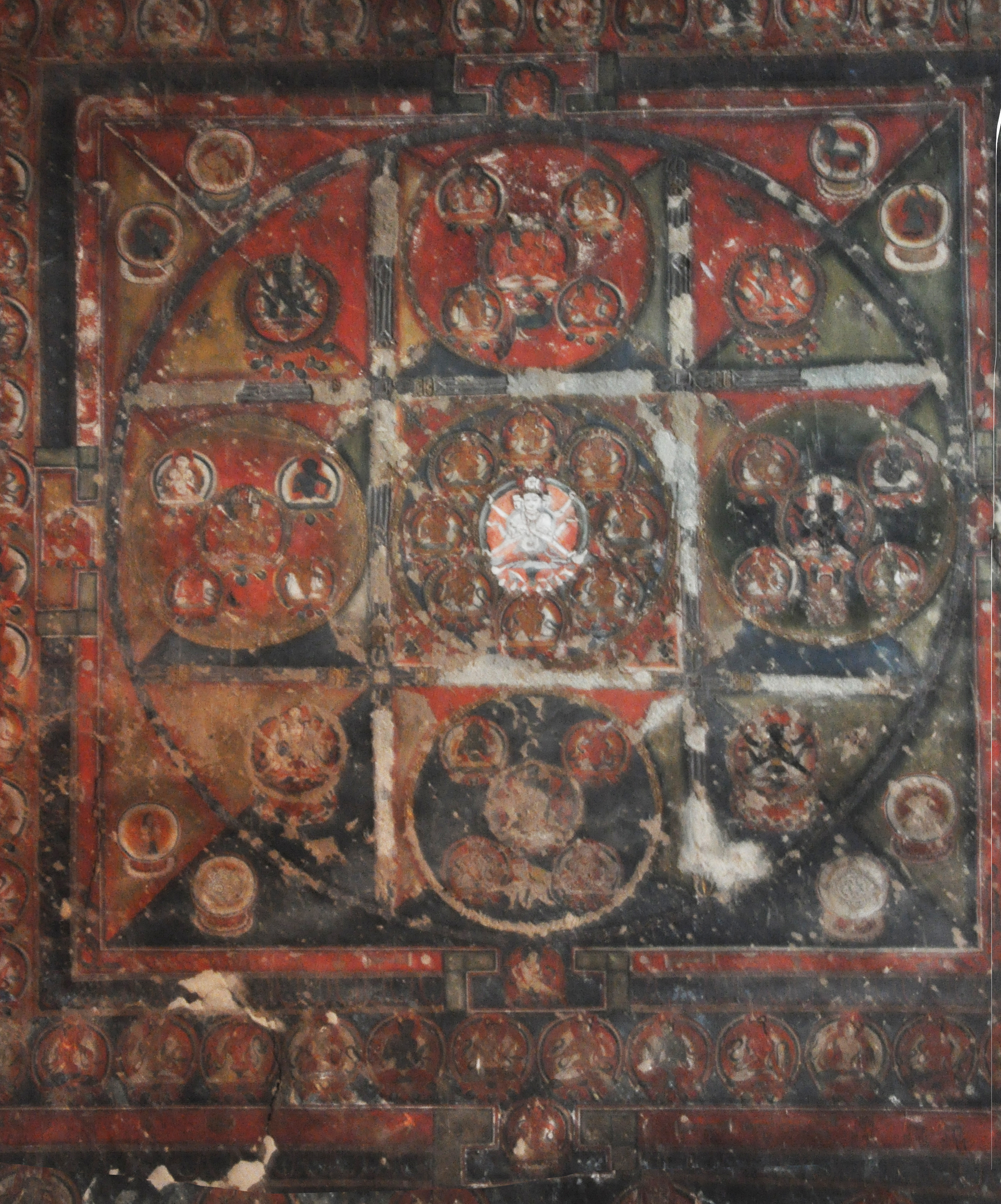
Nako Monastery frescoes

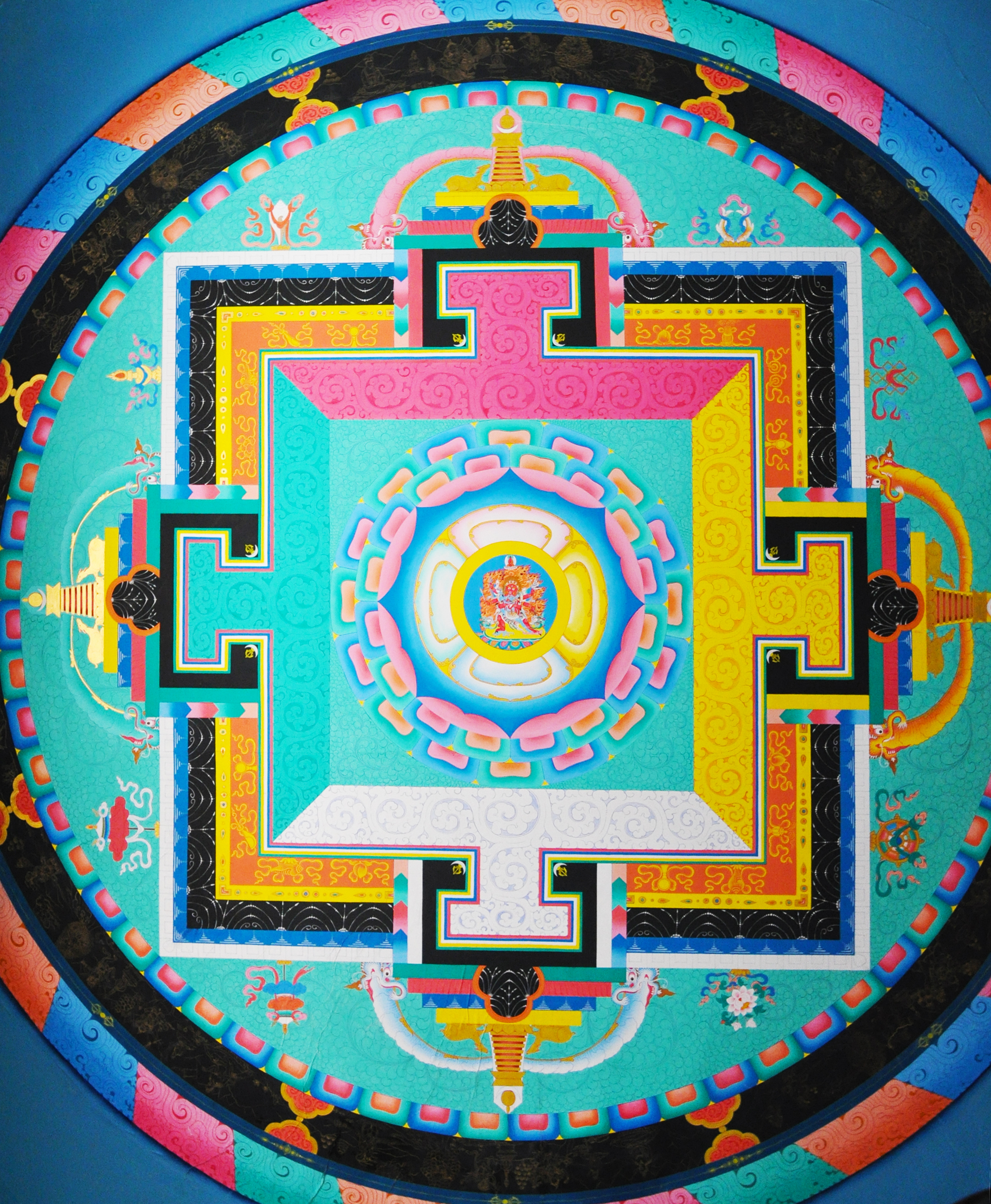
Hayagriva mandala

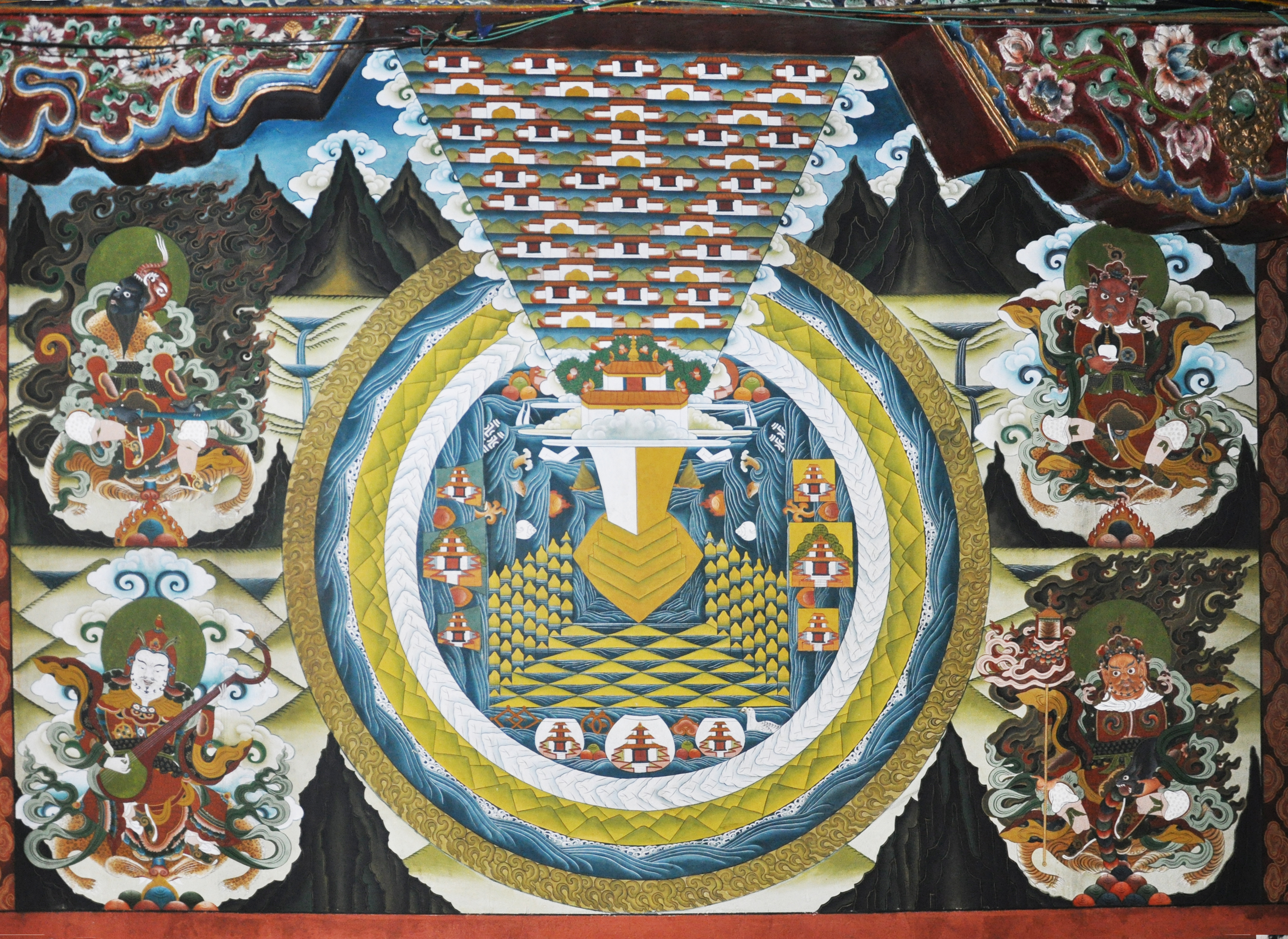
Buddhist universe with directional deities

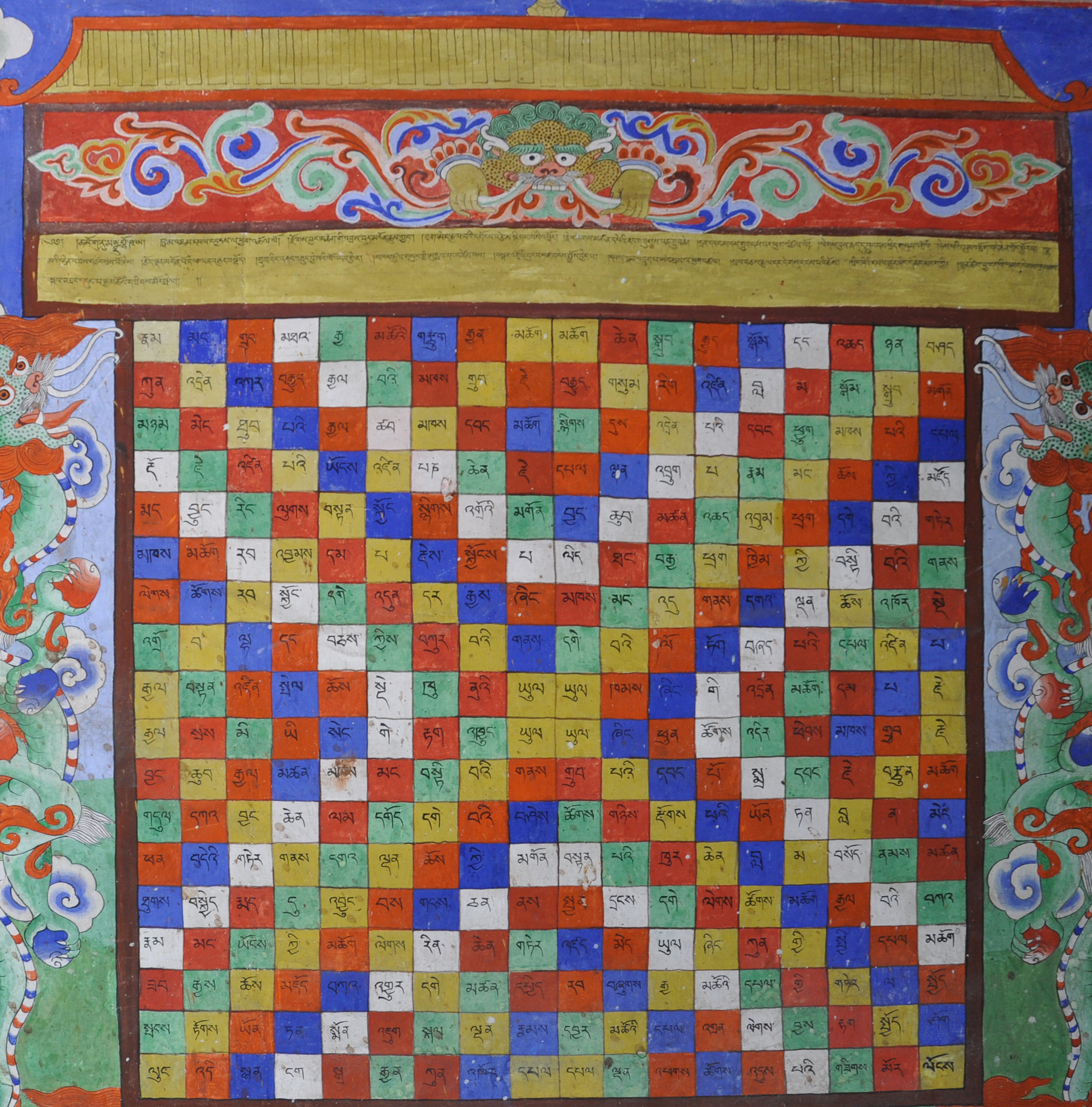
Tibetan Buddhist prayer chart

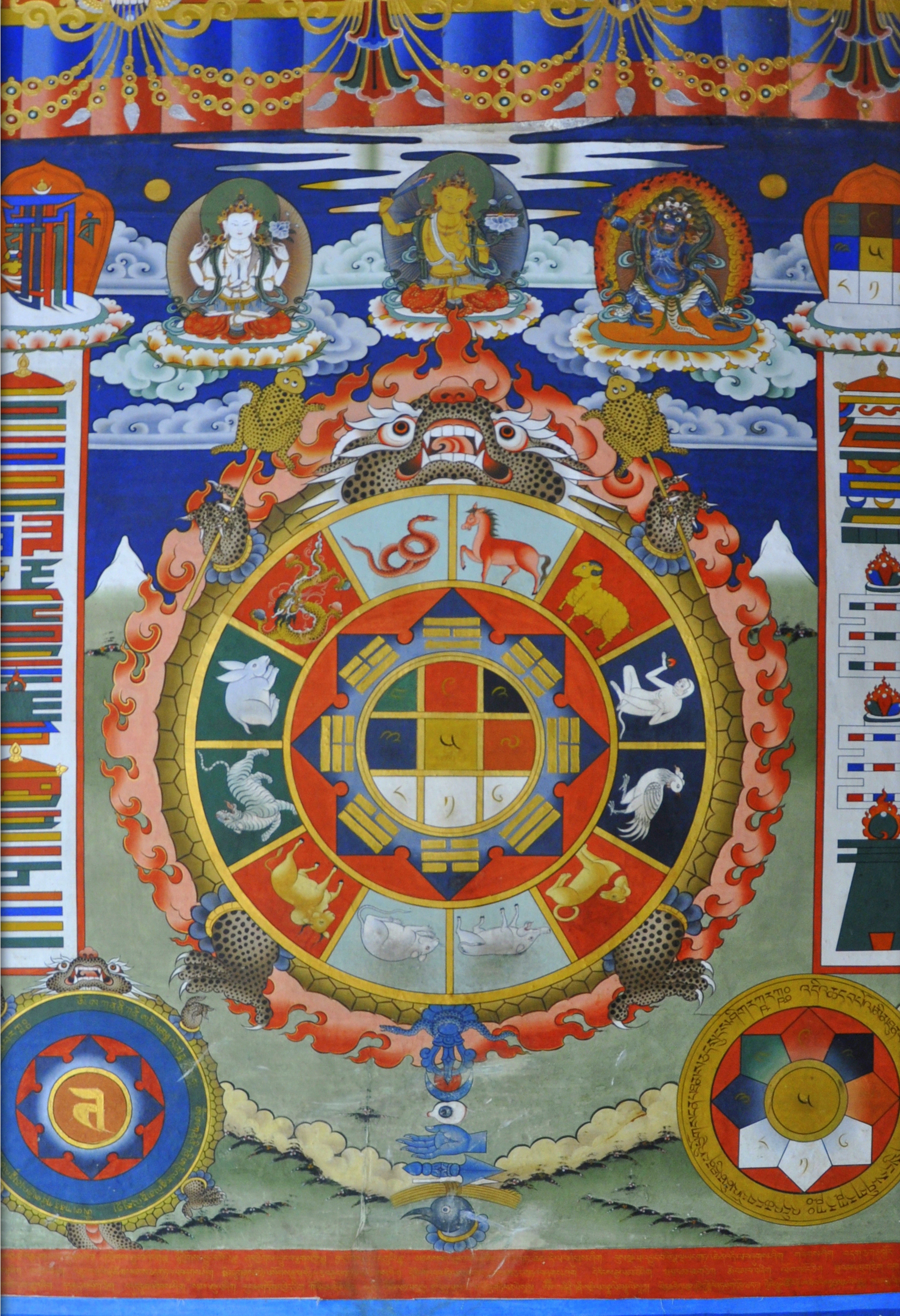
Turtle divination chart, Punakha Dzong Monastery, Bhutan

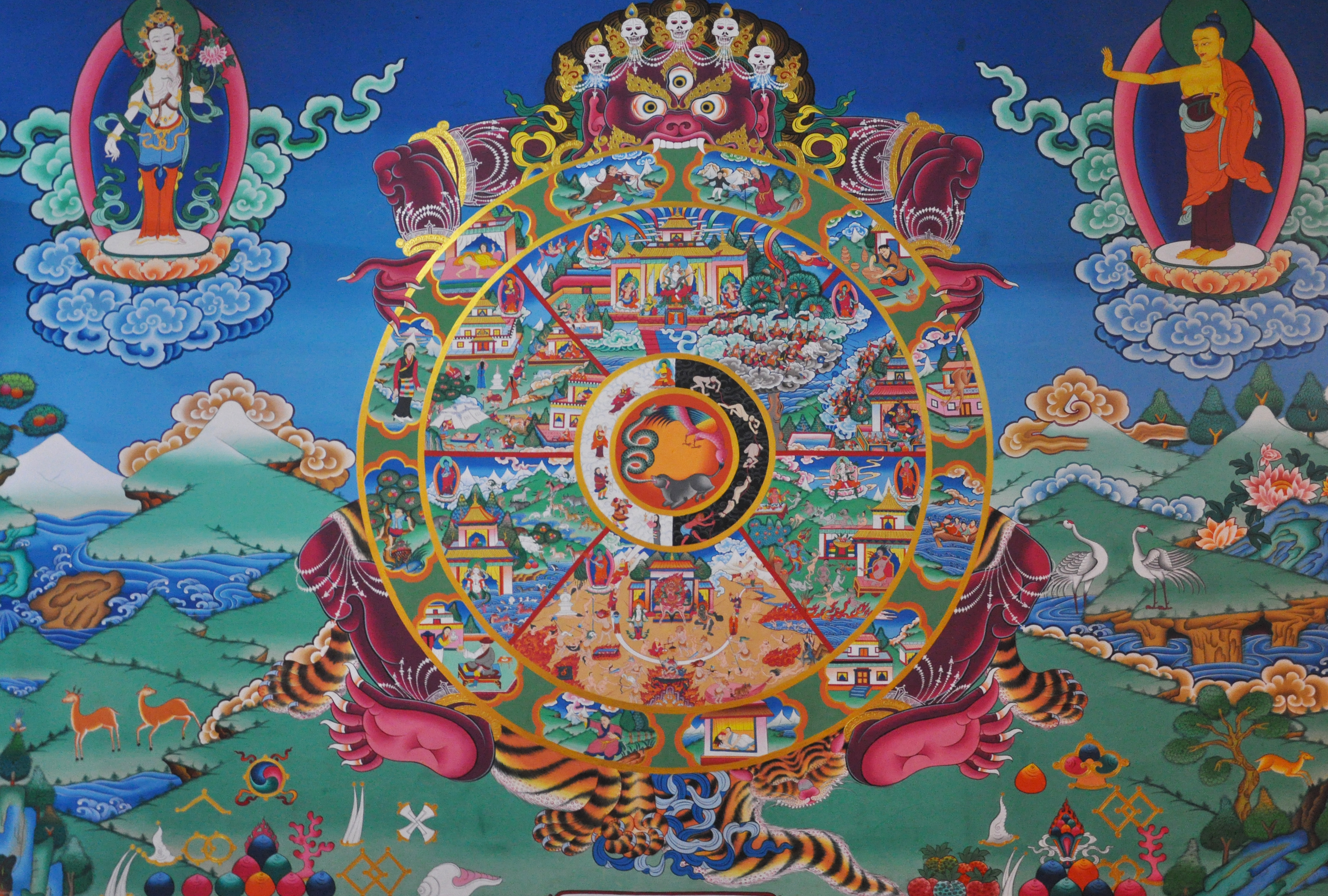
Wheel of life

=== Religious and cosmic objects ===
Murals, objects of devotion, inspire reverence towards the Buddha, bodhisattvas, and deities depicted in them. Monasteries display cosmic charts, mandalas, and paintings of Vajrayana practices.

=== Monastic life and stories ===
Monastery walls are often painted, with glimpses of monastic life and tales of Buddhist preaching and values. These artworks play a crucial role in teaching Buddhist principles and stories. They depict the life of the historical Buddha, important events in Buddhist history, and complex philosophical concepts. The murals use several art forms.

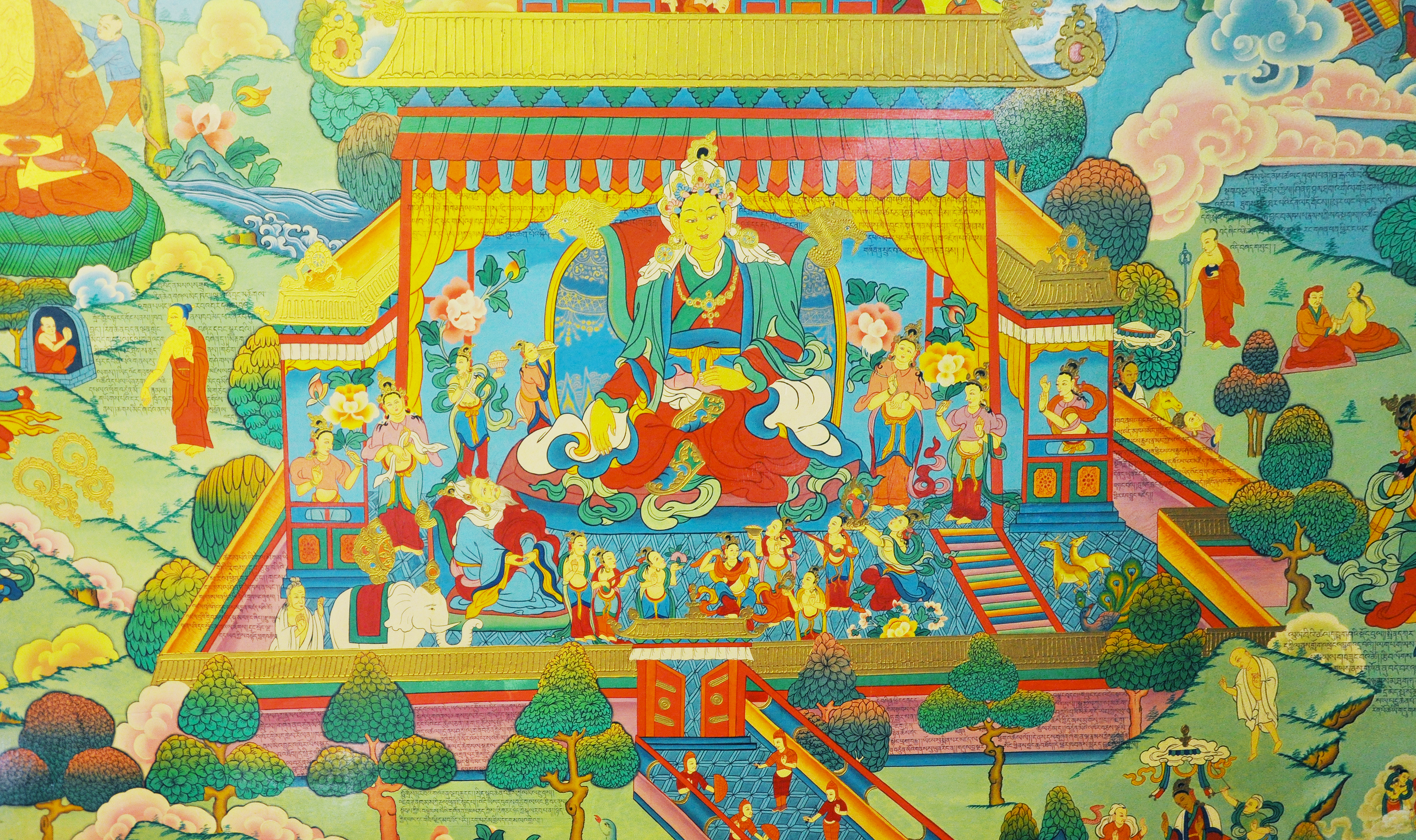
Monastic life

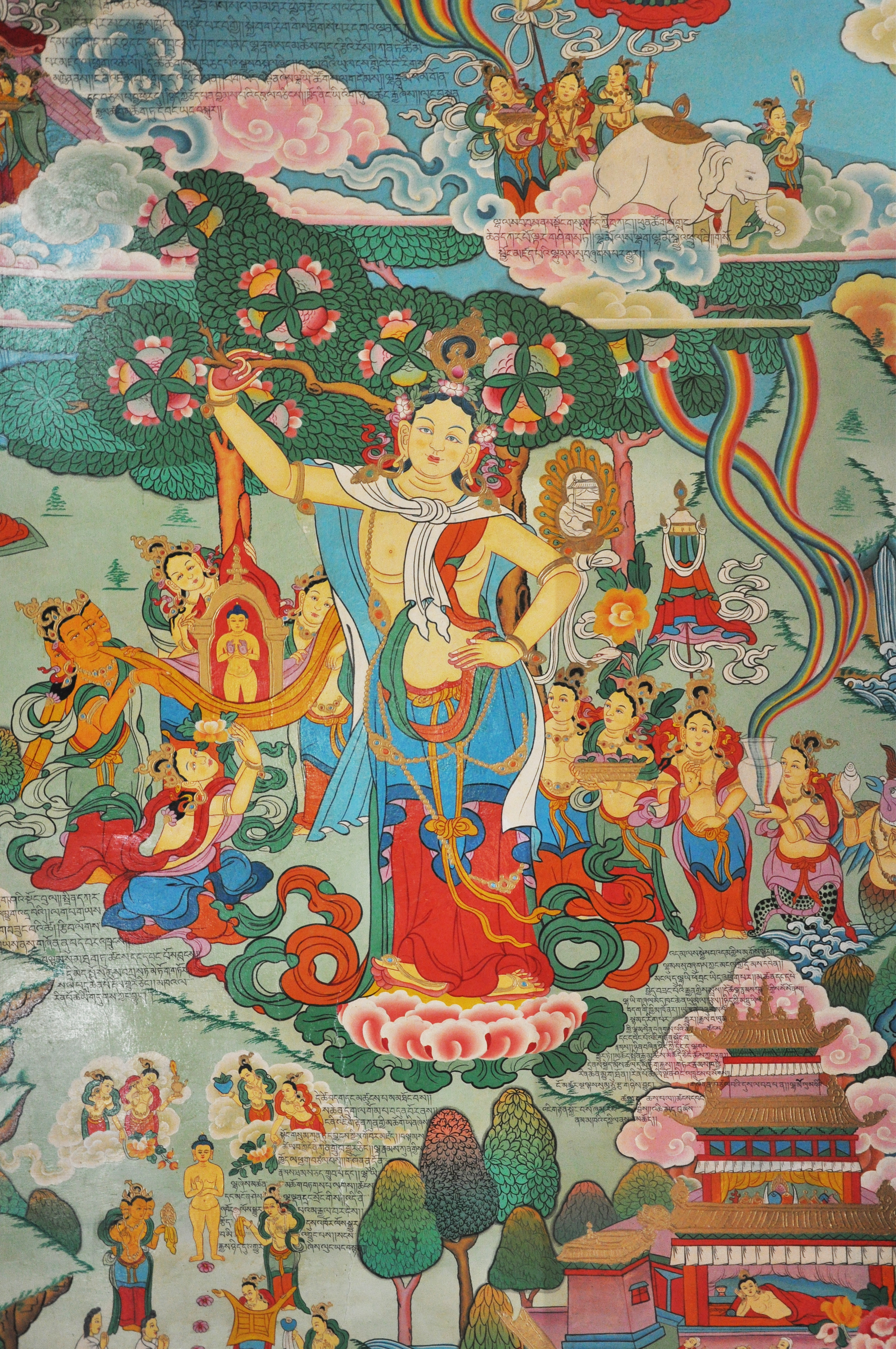
Maya, mother of the Buddha

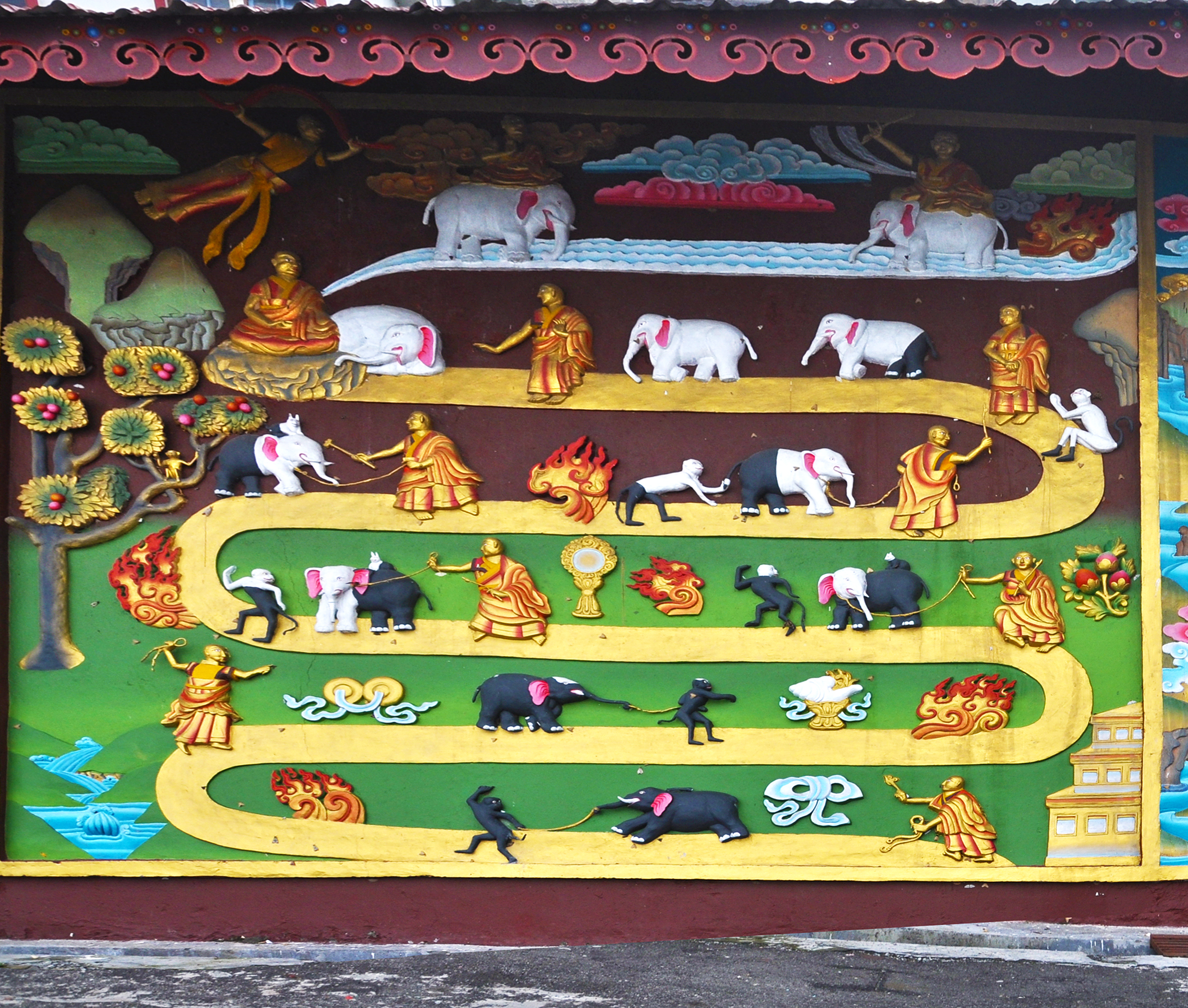
Nine stages of meditation

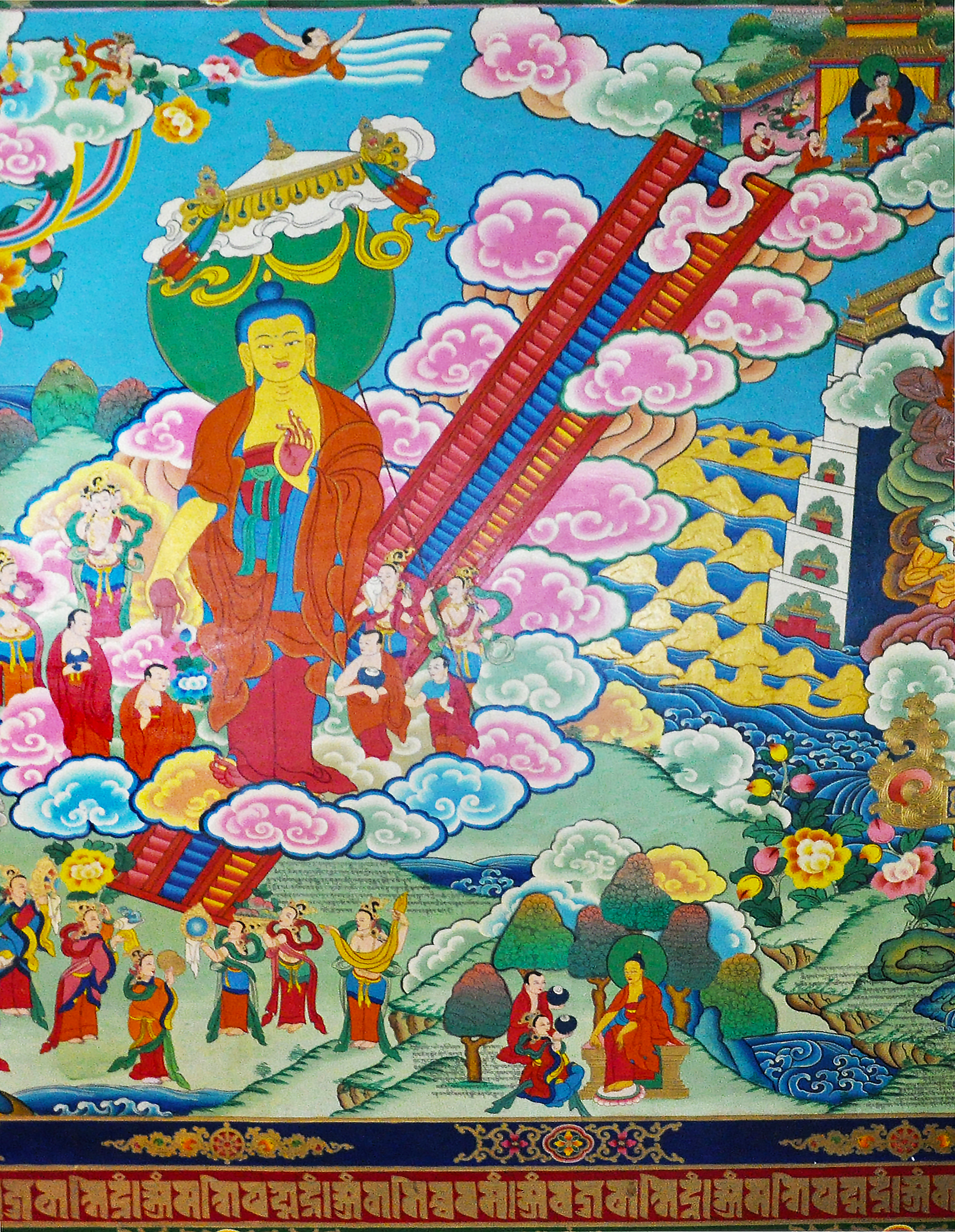
The Buddha's return from heaven
