= Tibetan art =

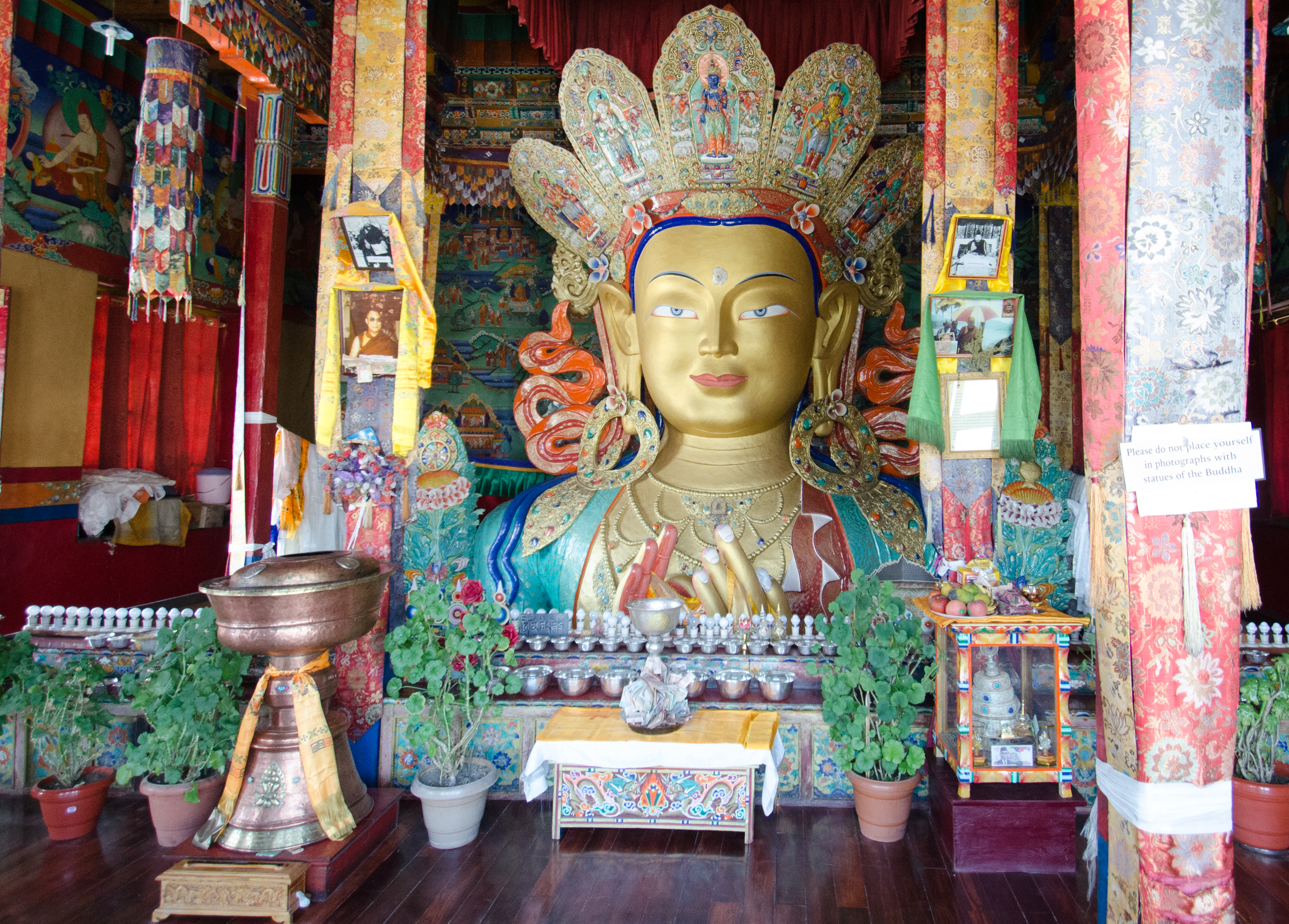
Large shrine statue of Maitreya, Thiksey Monastery, Ladakh, 1970

The vast majority of surviving Tibetan art created before the mid-20th century is religious, with the main forms being thangka, paintings on cloth, mostly in a technique described as gouache or distemper, Tibetan Buddhist wall paintings, and small statues in bronze, or large ones in clay, stucco or wood. They were commissioned by religious establishments or by pious individuals for use within the practice of Tibetan Buddhism and were manufactured in large workshops by monks and lay artists, who are mostly unknown. Various types of religious objects, such as the phurba or ritual dagger, are finely made and lavishly decorated. Secular objects, in particular jewellery and textiles, were also made, with Chinese influences strong in the latter.

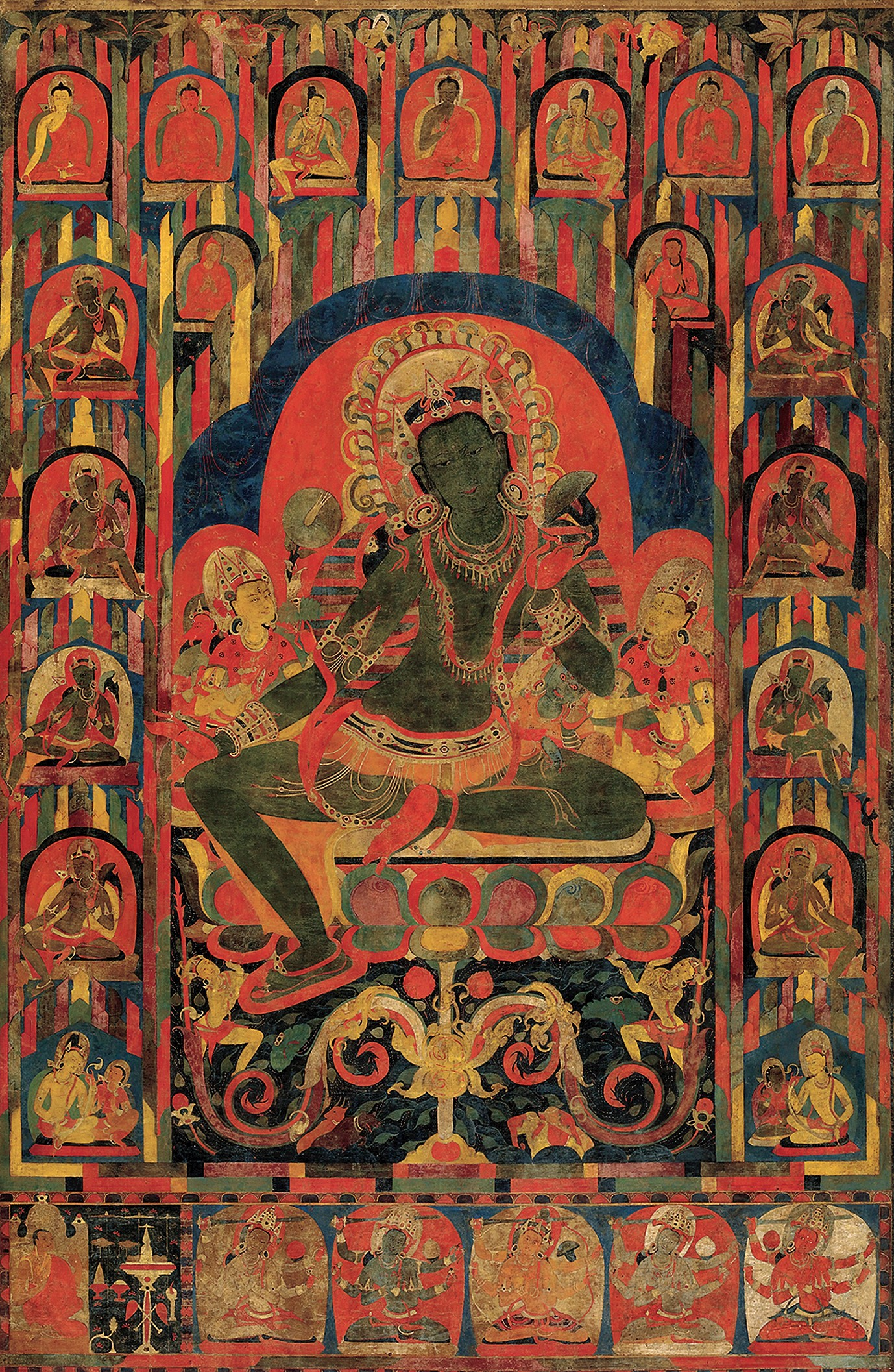
Thanka of Ashtamahabhaya Tara, late 12th century, gouache on cotton.

Himalayan art is an overall term for Tibetan art together with the art of Bhutan, Nepal, Ladakh, Kashmir and neighbouring parts of Mongolia and China where Tibetan Buddhism is practiced. Sino-Tibetan art refers to works in a Tibetan style and with Tibetan Buddhist iconography produced in either China or Tibet, often arising from patronage by Chinese emperors. The artists seem to have been a mixture of Tibetan and Chinese, with some Newari from Nepal, and the place of manufacture is often uncertain between the two. The less common term of Tibeto-Chinese may be used when the Tibetan element is the stronger.

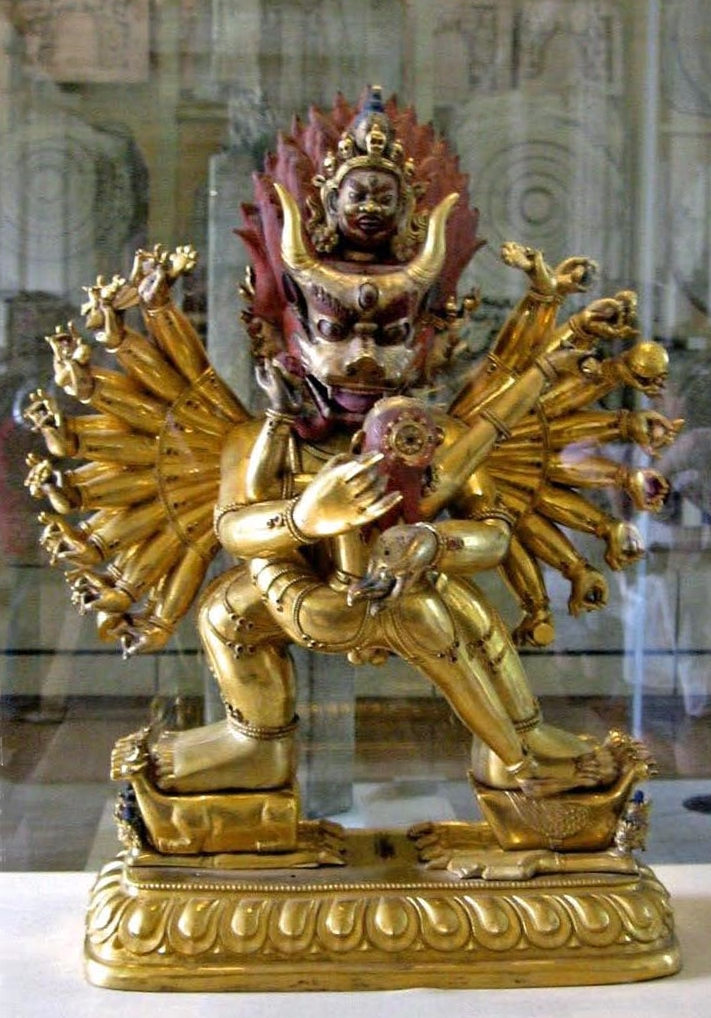
Yab-yum "bronze" with pigments and gilding

Tibetan religious art has been described as "almost unbelievably conservative", to a large extent representing "the perpetuation of the forms and iconography of the last phase of Buddhist art of India", ending about the 12th century. This was the Pala-Sena art of north-east India, relatively close to Tibet, and the home of key figures like Atisha, a missionary from Nalanda in Bihar. After the decline of Buddhism in India soon after, very little survives from the Indian Buddhist art of this or earlier periods except monumental sculpture, and art historians must deduce much about this vanished culture from Tibetan works. Other influences on Tibetan art over the centuries came from Chinese and Nepalese Buddhist art. Landscape backgrounds were adopted from Chinese painting from about the 14th century for some thanka, and Chinese ornamental styles became dominant around 1700.

The finest achievements are typically considered to be in painted thanka and small bronzes (often gilt-bronze), where the best works have very high levels of technical skill. These were generally private works, only seen within monasteries, and often specifically designed for meditation. More public art includes large statues for prayer halls, large appliqué thankas for temporary display during Tibetan festivals on thangka walls, and sand mandalas, also temporary.

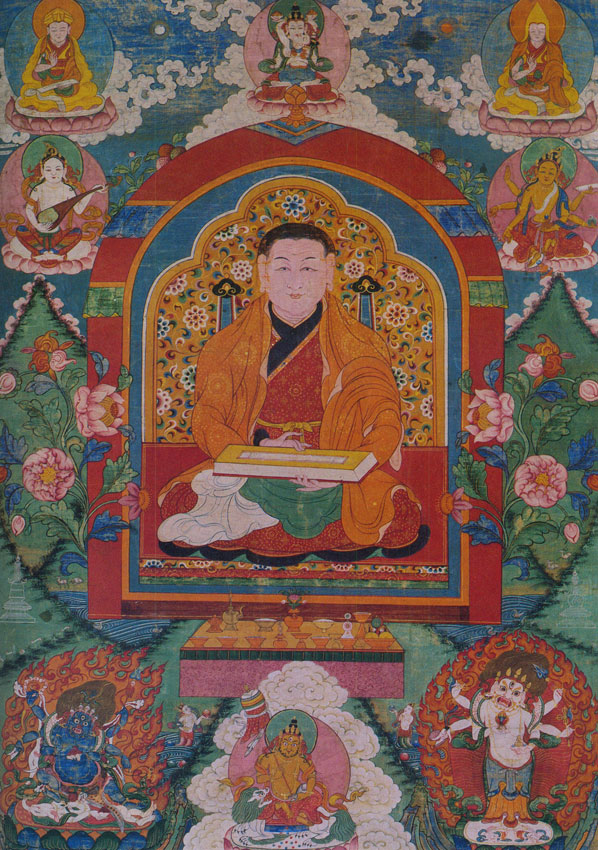
Self-portrait by the leading Mongolian monk Zanabazar (1635–1715)

== Artists ==
Painters and at least the modellers of sculpture were mostly monks, but less so for those made in China, or by the many Nepali artists who worked in or for Tibet. Many applied arts were made by lay craftspeople, sometimes working to designs for ornament supplied by monks. Apart from works from recent decades the names of the artists involved are unknown, except in the case of a few leading artist monks, such as Chöying Dorje, 10th Karmapa (1604–1674), and the Mongolian Zanabazar (1635–1715).

There have recently been rather controversial attempts to attribute some surviving works to a well-documented and significant Nepali artist called Aniko or Anige (1245–1306), who worked in painting, sculpture and architecture in Tibet and China, but it remains uncertain if anything by him, rather than his sons or followers, has survived.

== Painting ==
Paintings come in several types and sizes. The most important is the thangka, a broad term for portable paintings on cloth or paper that can be stored rolled-up. Larger ones may also be called "banners", and the really large ones for display on thangka walls at festivals are mostly made from appliqué cloth, with only minimal painting. Even relatively small thangkas which are much taller than they are wide may be called banners.

The usual painting technique is gouache on fine cotton, but other cloth may be used. Painting was over an underdrawing. Colours were originally bright, though many old paintings have faded. Most, and all before the 16th century, are square or have a vertical "portrait" format, and most are under a metre tall. There are also images in silk tapestry using the Chinese kesi technique. The earliest thangka to survive are some from the blocked-up cave near Dunhuang that date from a period of Tibetan occupation there in the 10th century.

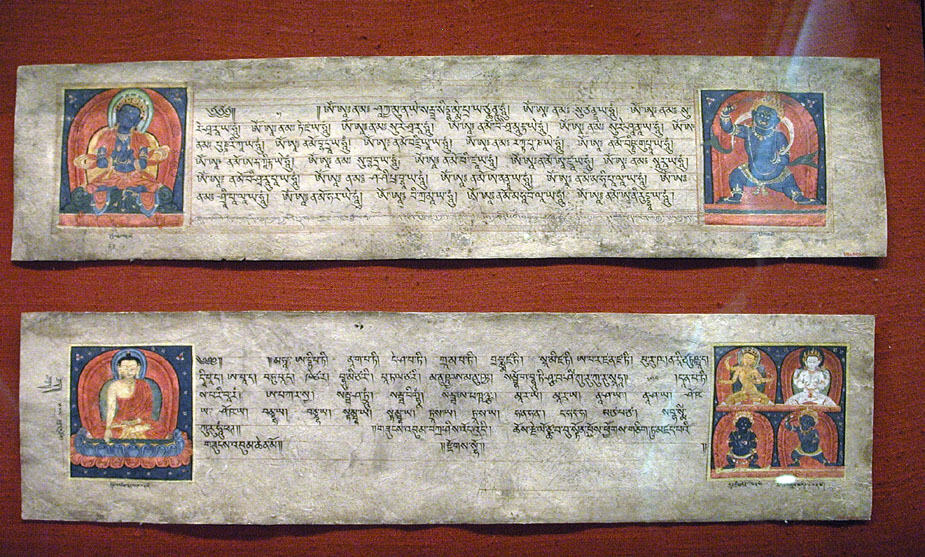
Two pages from a 14th or 15th-century manuscript

Tsakli or "initiation cards" are small painted (or sometimes printed) images on cloth, glued to a card backing, usually showing a relatively simple image of a sacred figure, or a pair. They were produced in sets of perhaps six to over a hundred, and used for instructing monks and also the temporary consecration and protection of sites or objects. The figure may be identified in ink on the back. They are one of a number of Tibetan forms without close comparators in neighbouring Buddhist countries.

Most monasteries and temples in Tibet had wall paintings, a large percentage of which have been destroyed or badly damaged. These were painted over several plaster-like layers of "clay, chopped-up straw, and dung" in the same technique as thangkas. They usually cover the entire wall above a certain level, using much the same subjects and styles as thangkas. Paintings and other works were ritually consecrated upon completion.

Book covers more often included painted decoration than the pages of the book. This is usually on the inside of the wood cover, so the painting is protected. Initially books had the very long, thin, shape of Indian palm leaf manuscripts whatever material was used, allowing only a long row of tsakli-like single figures. Later different shapes were used, allowing larger thangka-style compositions. Murals on Tibetan Buddhist monasteries.

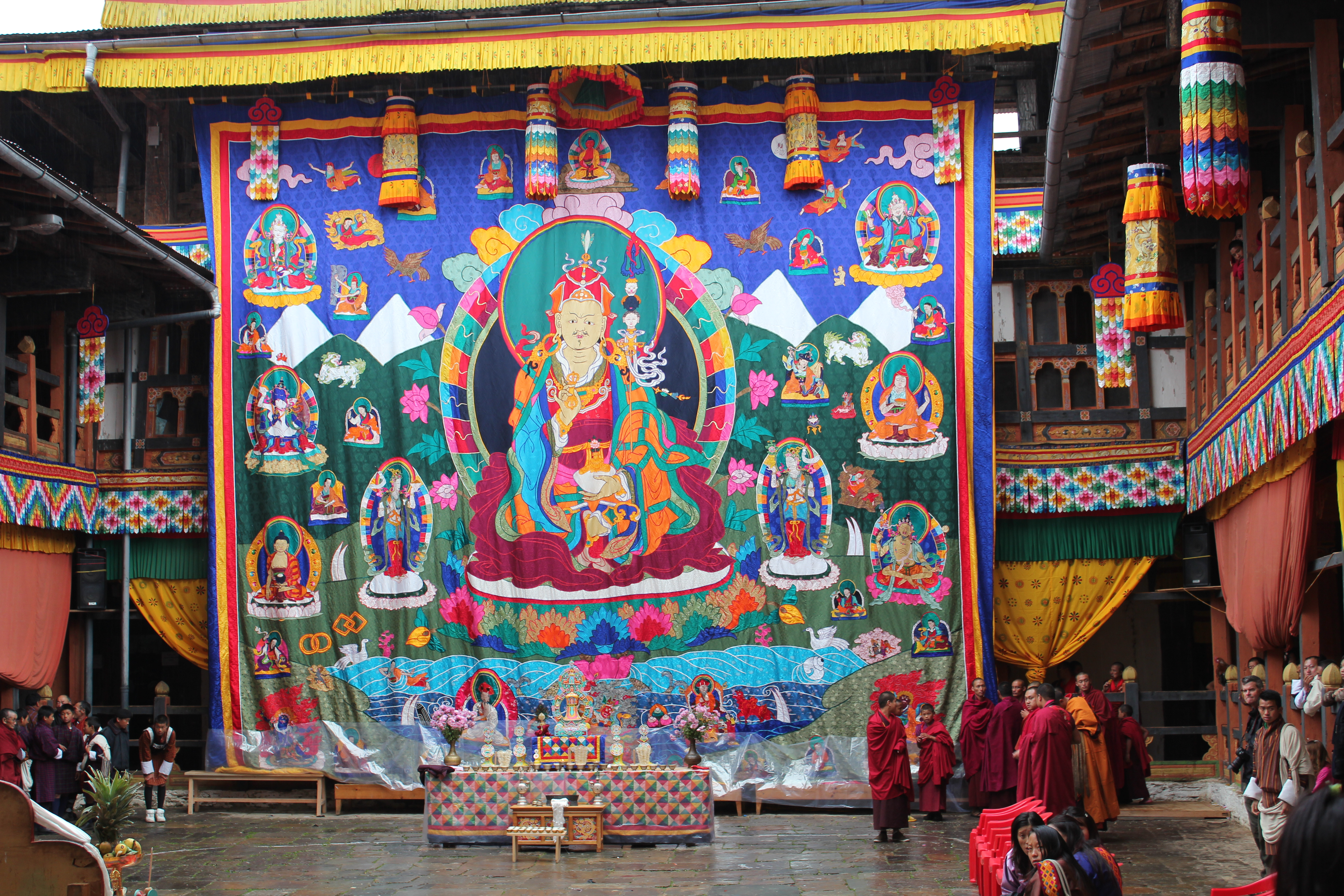
Large appliqué festival thangka hung in the courtyard at Jakar Dzong in Bhutan

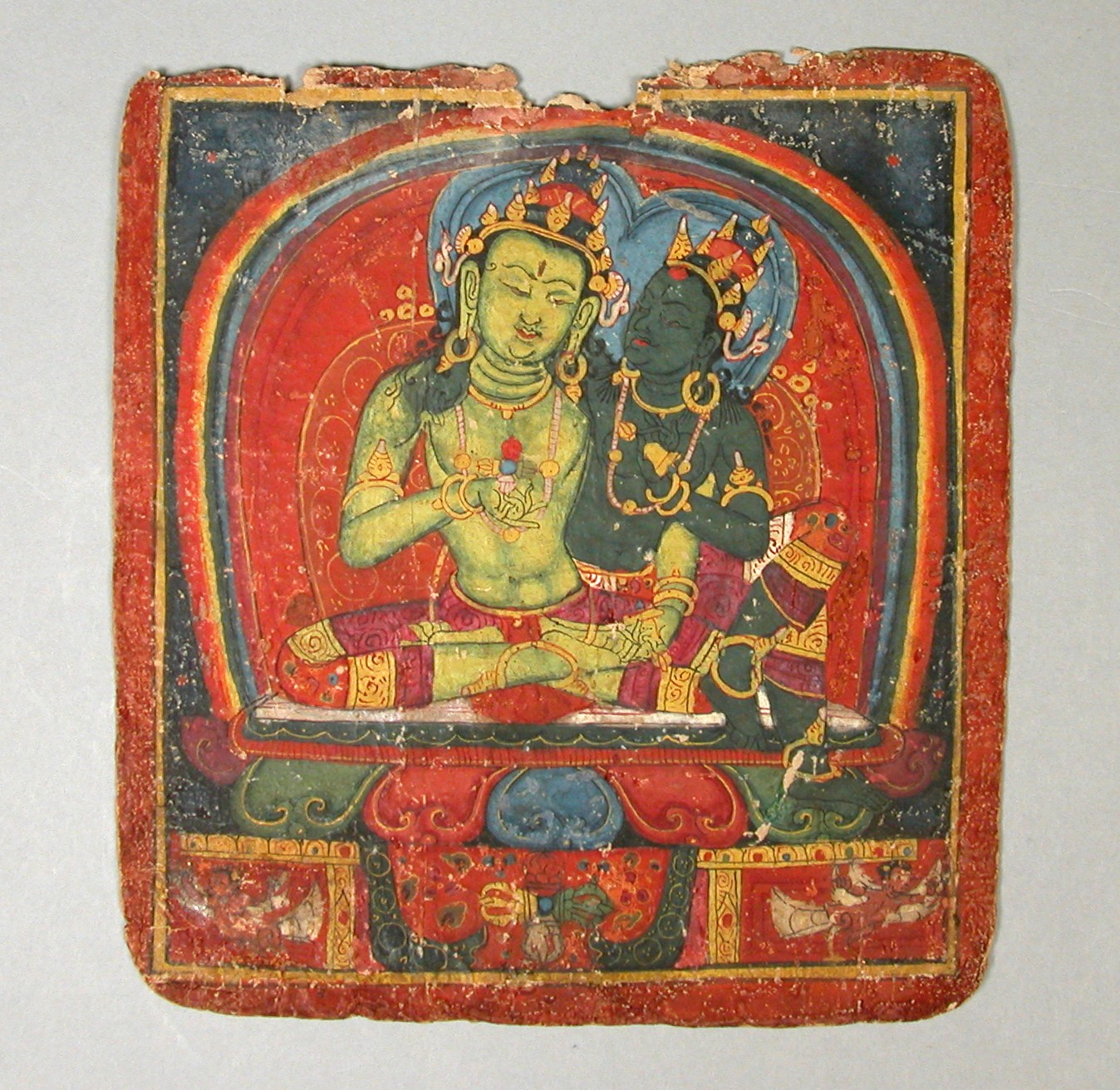
Tsakli from a large set, 15th century, 16 x 14.5 cm

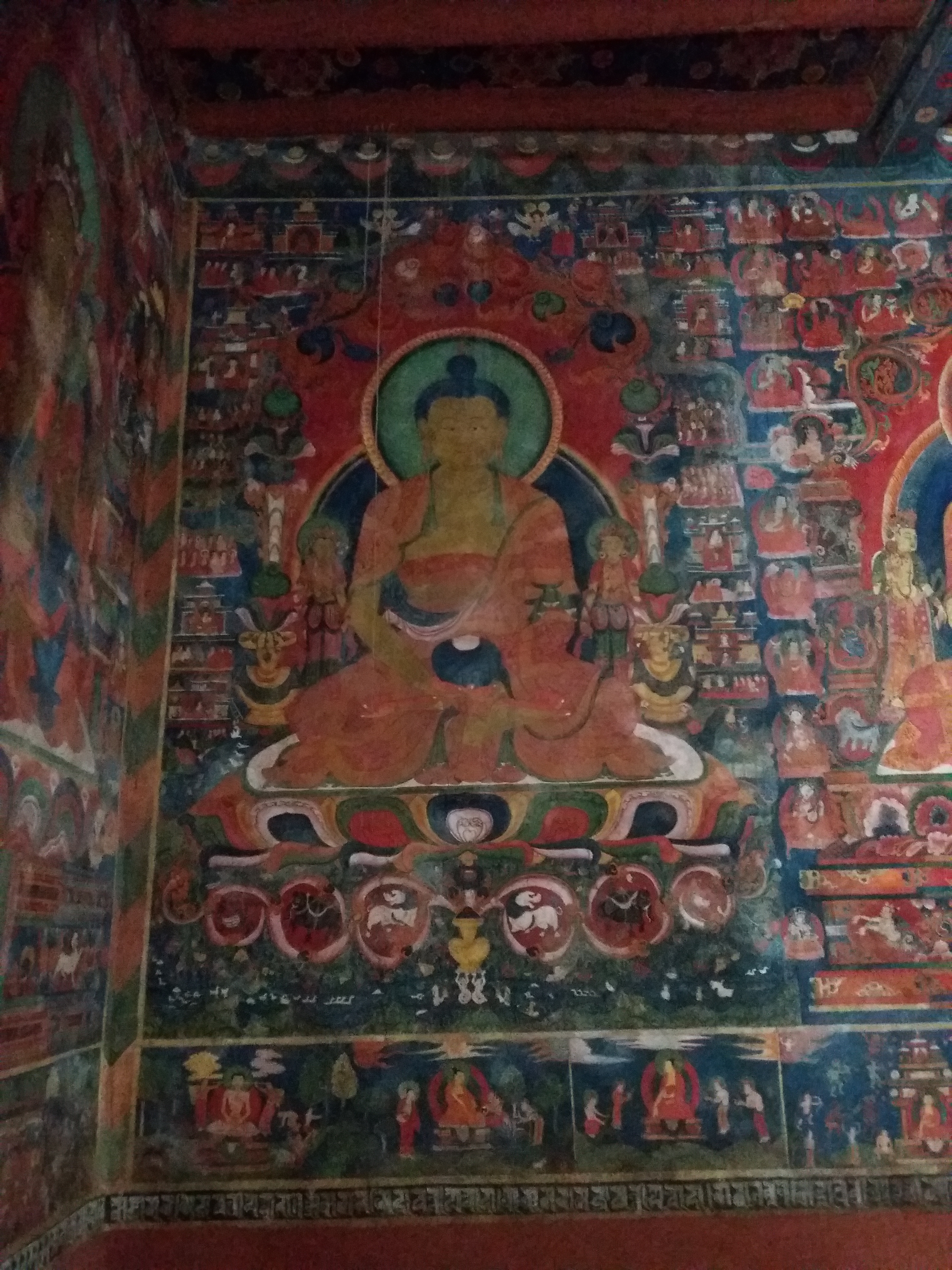
Section of wall painting in Basgo monastery, Ladakh

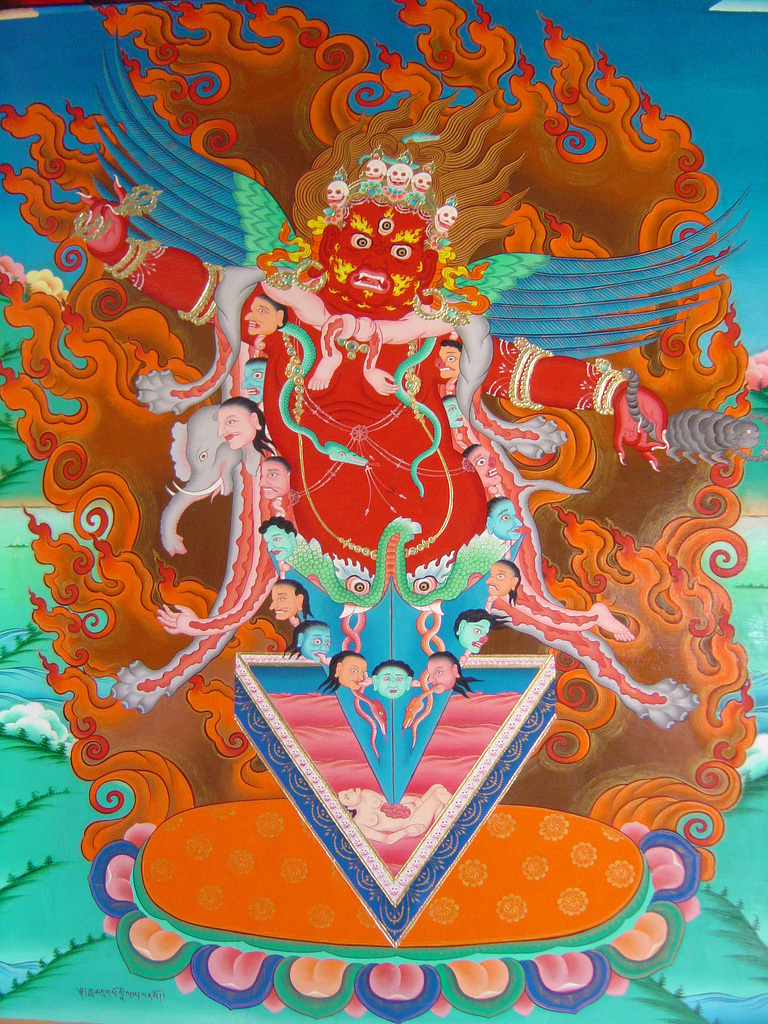
Modern mural at Stakna Gompa, Ladakh

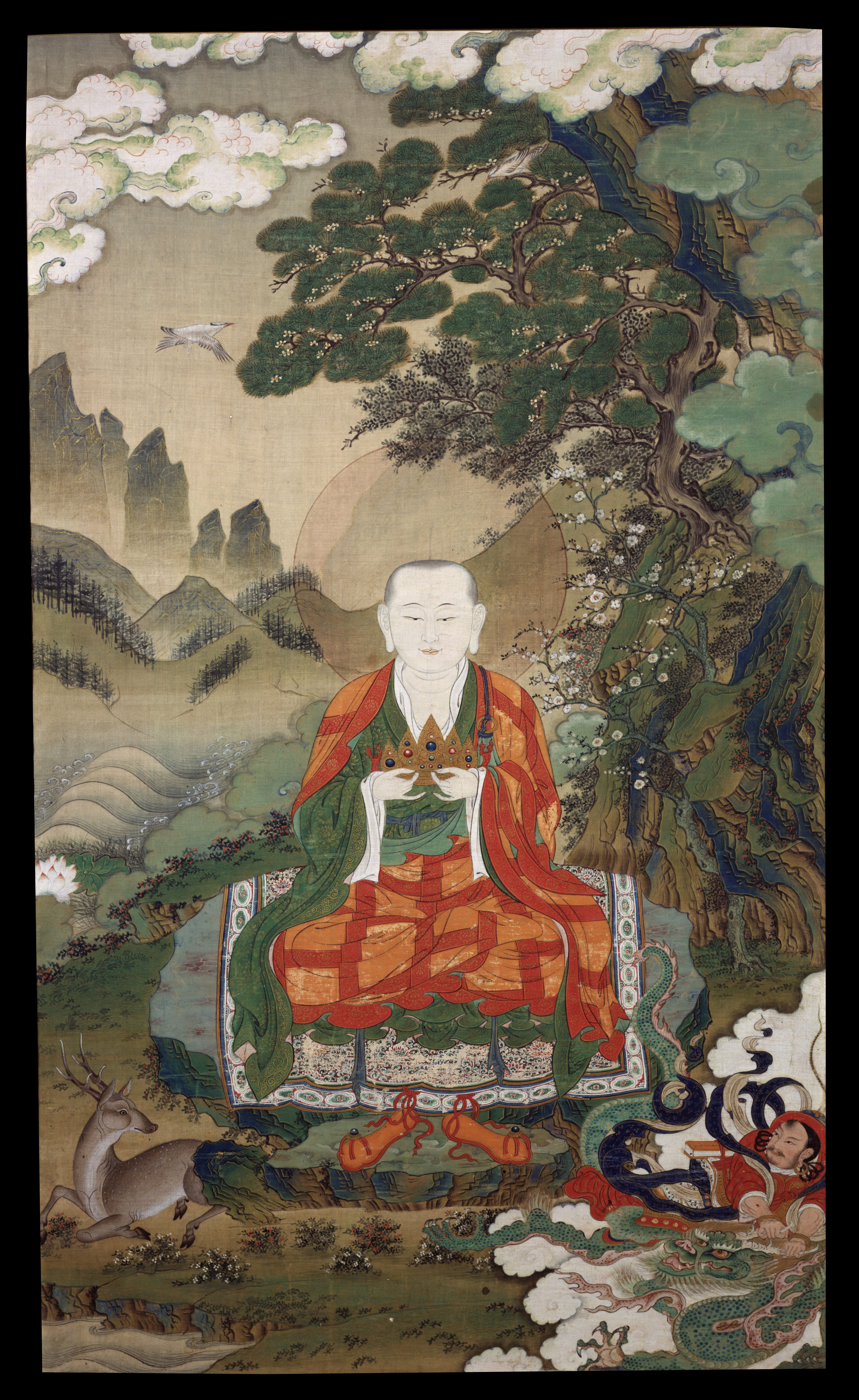
Rahula (16th century)

== Sculpture ==
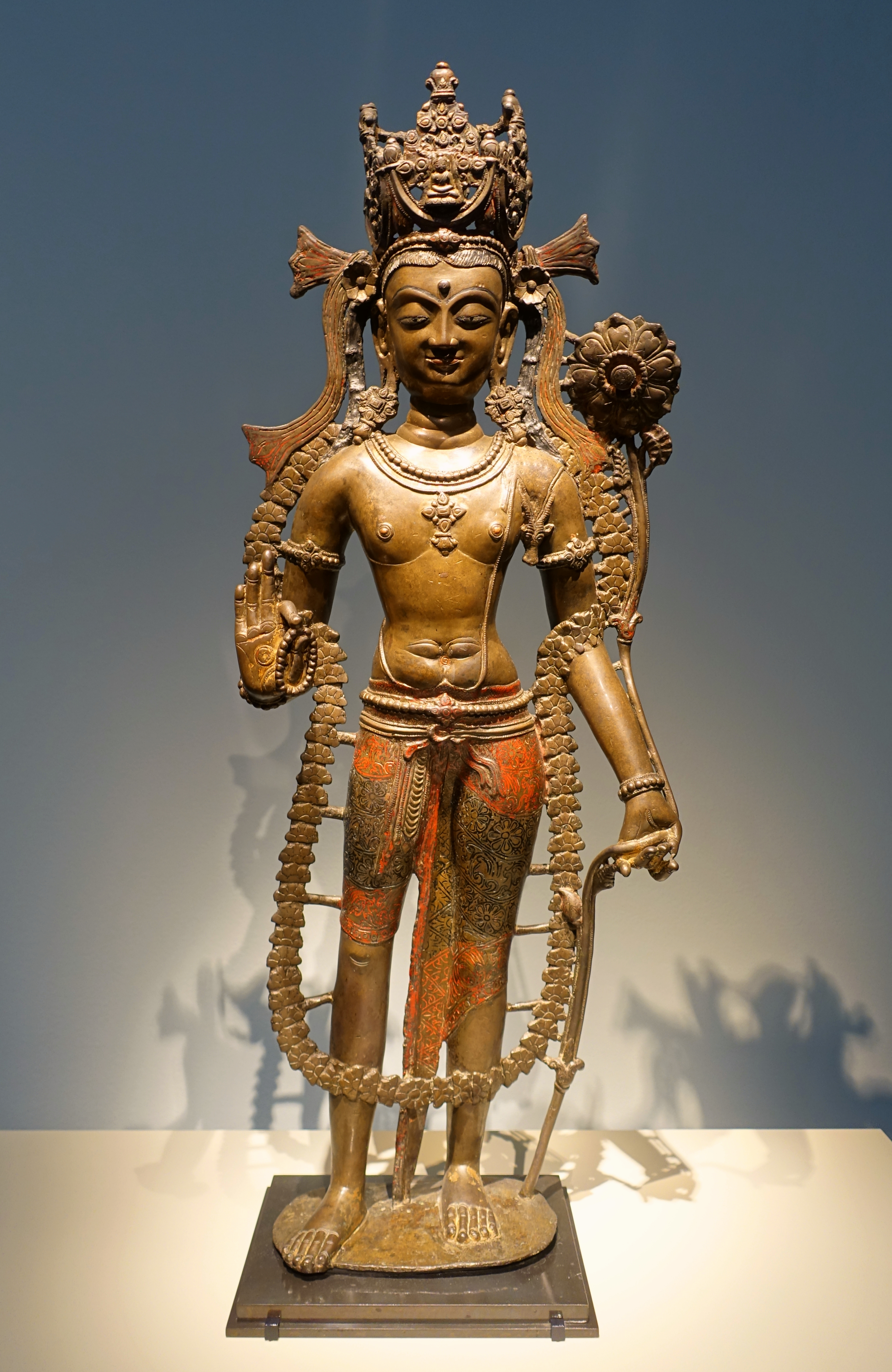
Avalokiteshvara, 11th-century, West Tibet. Brass with copper & tin inlay, coloured wax, traces of gilding, and pigment.

The most common material for smaller sculptures is metal, usually "bronze", which is often gilded. Modern scientific analysis shows that the actual compositions of Tibetan "bronze" (or copper alloy) are even more variable than in bronze from other parts of the world, being very often brass and sometimes almost pure copper. The compositions sometimes vary considerably from one end of a statue to the other. Tibetan foundries seem to have used whatever base metal was available, and not to have been too careful in ensuring proper mixing. Pieces made in China or Mongolia are generally much more homogenous.

Precious metals may be used, especially for Imperial Chinese commissions, but figures mainly in gold or silver are very rare; evidently some were made, but they have presumably been recycled as bullion later on. A very high-quality yab-yum pair in the Hermitage Museum with an inscribed date to the Ming Yongle reign of 1403–1425 is made of copper and about 40% gold, but this is a rarity.

Tibet has deposits of gold, but under the influence of Bon, mining was regarded as rather immoral, and only the meagre product of panning in rivers was acceptable. Large inflows of gold came from China only after the Mongol Yuan dynasty began to heavily patronize Tibetan Buddhism in the late 13th century.

Metal sculptures sometimes have colour added by a variety of techniques including inlays, partial gilding, lacquer paint, coloured wax, and using alloys with different metal mixtures, especially zinc to give different colours. Jewels may be inserted into the metal. The usual basic casting technique is lost wax casting; many works, especially in later periods, are cast in several pieces, then joined. Small relics of distinguished teachers were often placed inside the hollow statues, wrapped in paper with writing identifying them.

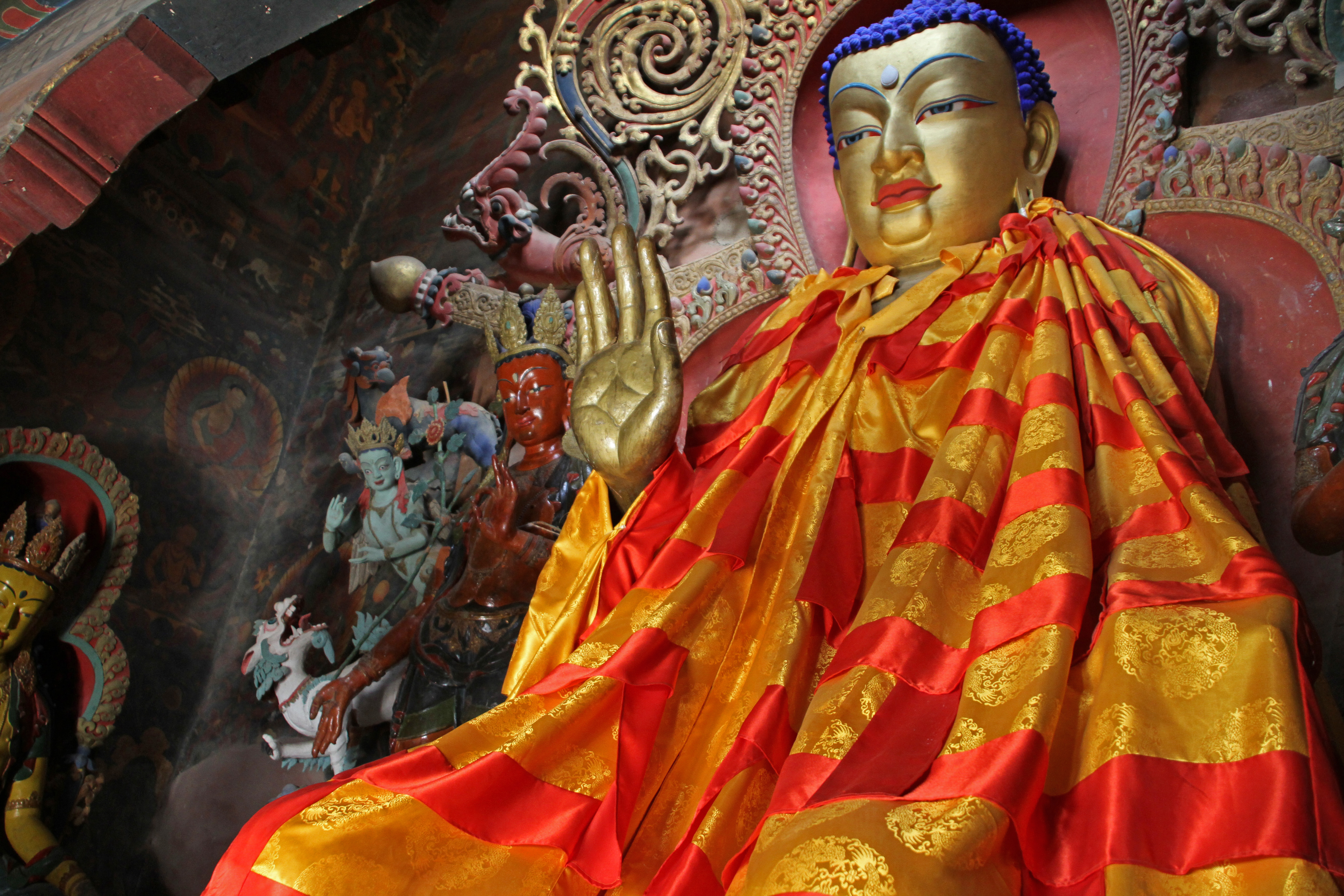
Large shrine statue, Kumbum Monastery

Many of the common materials for sculpture are not often used in Tibet. Wood was expensive, and generally used for buildings, furniture and caskets rather than sculpture (the wood reliefs at the Jokhang in Lhasa are by Nepali sculptors brought in for the purpose). Wood doorway surrounds in monasteries sometimes had figurative carvings. But small works in wood, ivory, terracotta and stone are found. Stone is mainly used for small steles carved in relief, or rock reliefs carved into cliffs beside paths, which were then painted.

Large sculptures, almost all sacred figures in a meditating or teaching seated position, are mostly for the altars of temples or prayer halls. The Tibetan prototype for these is the Jowo, a bronze statue of the Buddha in Lhasa, supposedly brought from China by a Tang dynasty princess marrying the Tibetan king. Most later Tibetan examples are made of clay or rammed earth over a hollow interior stuffed with straw, with wood supports for the largest. They are then painted and partly gilded, and often finished with varnish.

Tsa-tsa are small relief plaques or miniature chortens made in moulds with clay or rammed earth. Many are left in places considered holy, and the chorten-shaped ones play a part in funerary rituals. Some include ashes from the cremated remains of a deceased person, or objects symbolizing them. Others, like their Indian predecessors, work as souvenirs of pilgrimages, and are taken home to be displayed.

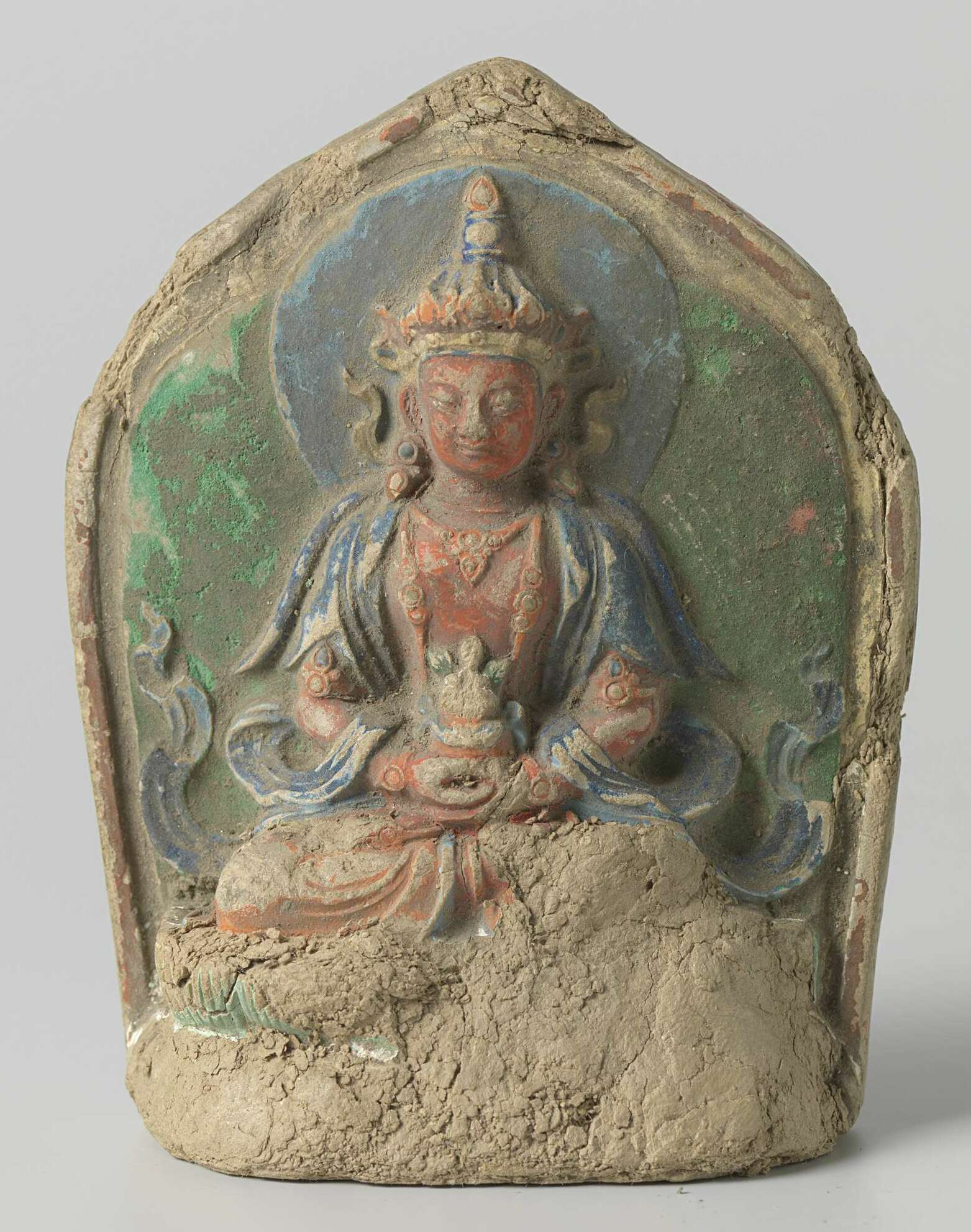
18th-century tsa-tsa of Amitayus, in pressed loam

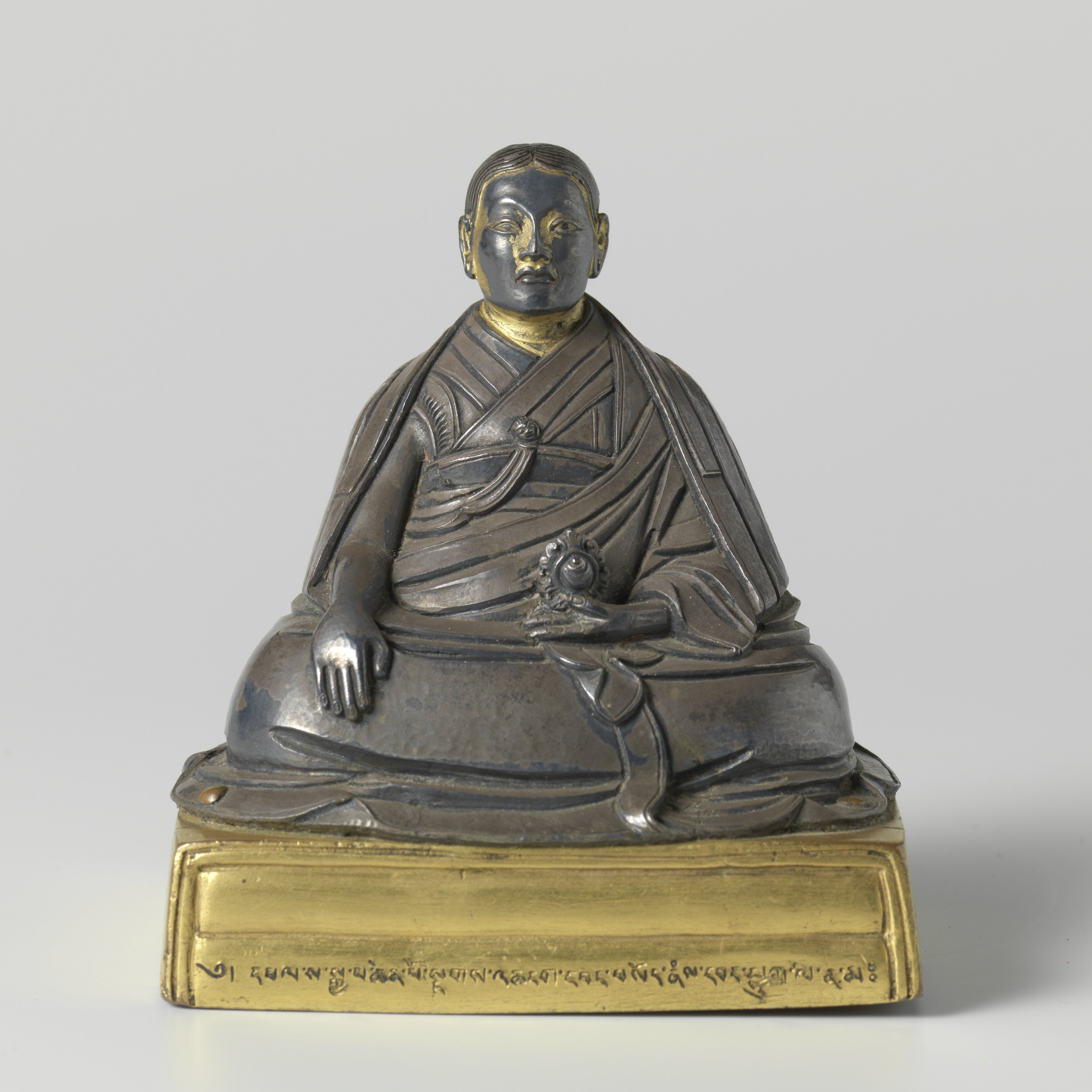
17th-century monk portrait. Silvered copper, with gilding

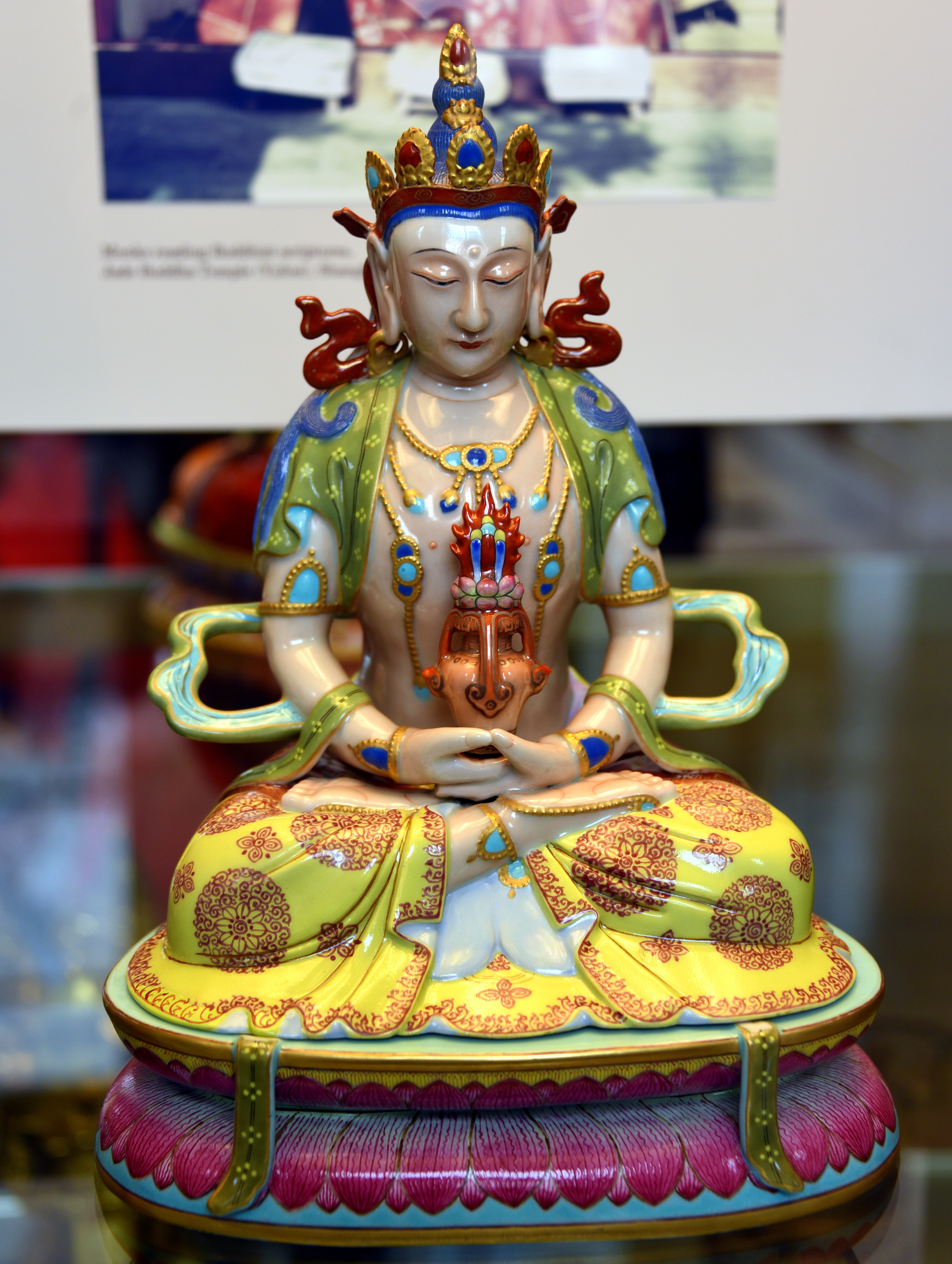
Sino-Tibetan bodhisattva in Chinese porcelain, late 18th or 19th century

== Other media for Buddhist art ==
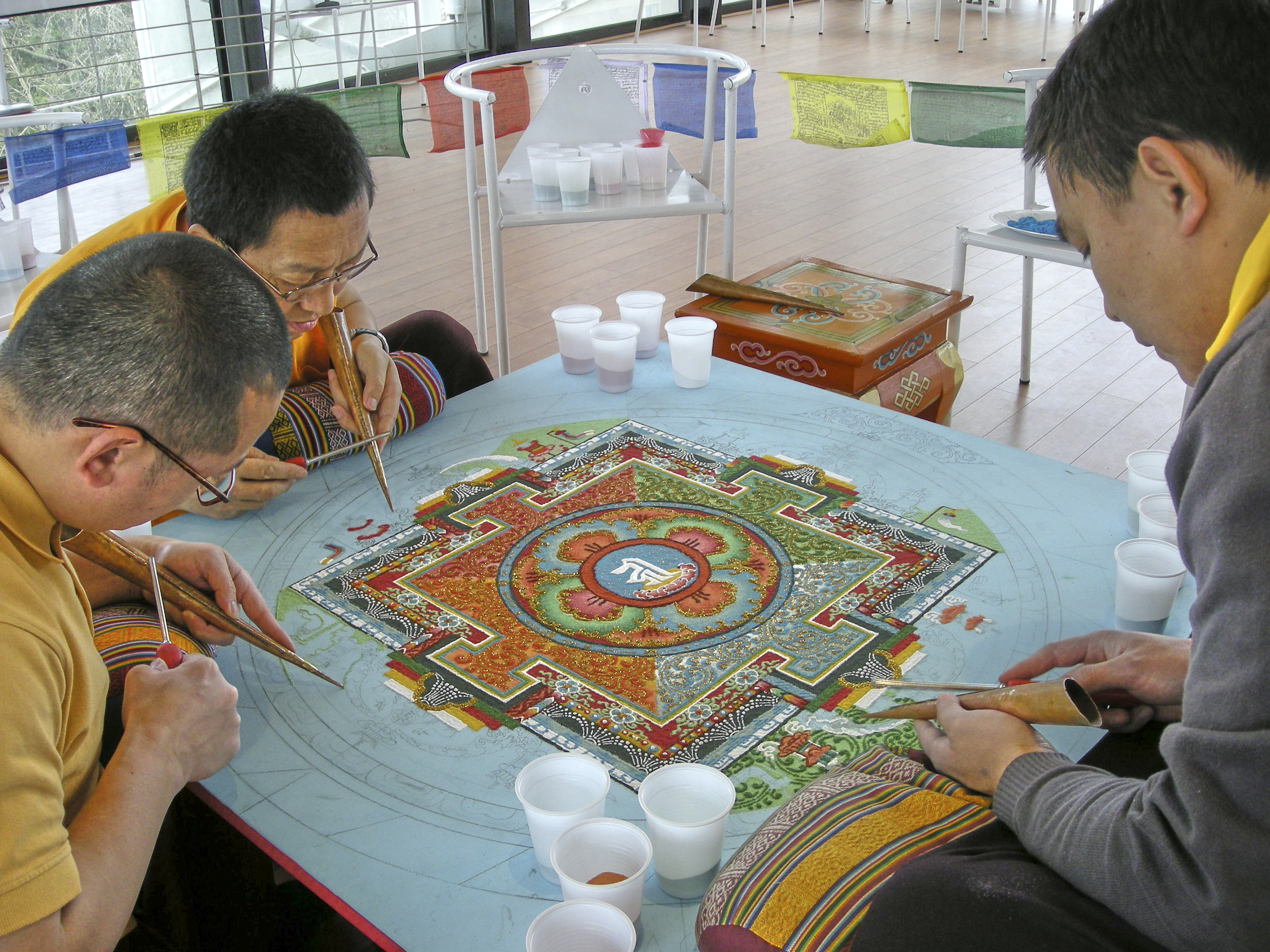
Making a sand mandala with chak-pur. Coloured prayer flags are hung around the working area. France, 2008

There are types of Buddhist art that are deliberately temporary, for use in rituals and meditation. The best known of these is the sand mandala, a largely geometric image made up with grains of sand or minerals, where necessary dyed to give several bright colours. These are placed onto a drawn pattern on a flat and even ground surface with great skill, using cone-shaped funnels called chak-pur and fingers. The mandala is generally square or round, and can be between two and three metres across. Making the mandala is itself a religious act, and the image's temporary nature is part of the teaching. Many are made for festivals, and after a few days on display they are simply swept away. The same patterns are often used in painted thangkas, with or without figures, which are generally not attempted in sand.

Torma are sculpted ritual offerings made of edible materials, with yak butter and flour the most common and often the only main ingredients, along with colourings. They are therefore a form of butter sculpture. Eggs, milk and other ingredients even including meat may be used. They are used in various contexts, the most common of which is being placed on altars. Very large ones may be made for special festivals. Some are eaten after a period of ritual use.

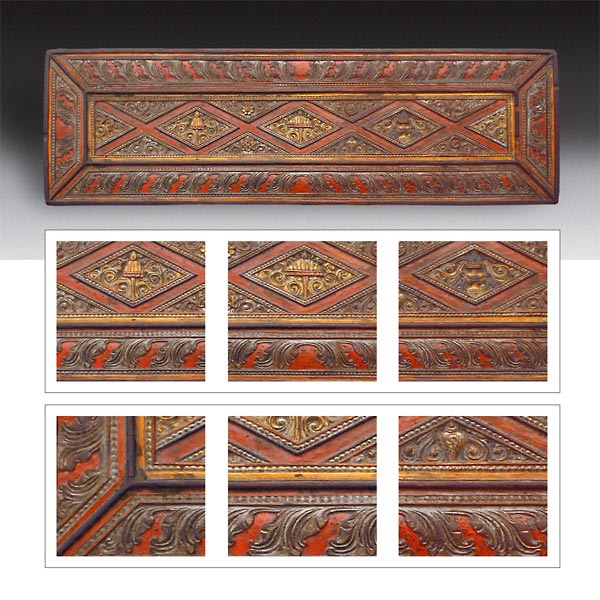
15/16th century carved and lacquered wood manuscript cover. The design includes stupas and canopies within geometric designs, the auspicious symbols (ashtamangala) including the "Precious Umbrella" that symbolizes the wholesome activity of preserving beings from harmful forces; the "Victory Banner" that celebrates the activities of one's own and others' body and mind over obstacles, as well as the "Vase of Treasure" for an endless reign of wealth and prosperity.

Many types of object for both religious or secular use were lavishly decorated in the same styles, mixing metalwork with gemstones. These include vases, offering plates and model mountain "mandala plates", containers and other objects for altars, rituals, and the private use of senior monks, as well as use by wealthy lay persons. In recent centuries China was the main influence on the rich ornamentation used, with Nepal and India prominent earlier.

Tibetan Buddhism has a number of distinctive ritual instruments, some for use on general altars, and others for special tantric rituals; some are used in both. There are also musical instruments used in religious ceremonies, but these are not covered here. Many of the instruments are shared with the Hindu tantra tradition. Most are usually in bronze, and the most important are the vajra (or dorje), a small ritual weapon that is normally accompanied by a small bell, the phurba dagger, kartika flaying knife, the khatvanga staff or wand, and the kapala, a skull cup, using a real skull, but often with an elaborate metalwork setting. The kangling thigh-bone trumpet, also mainly real bone, may also have metal mounts.

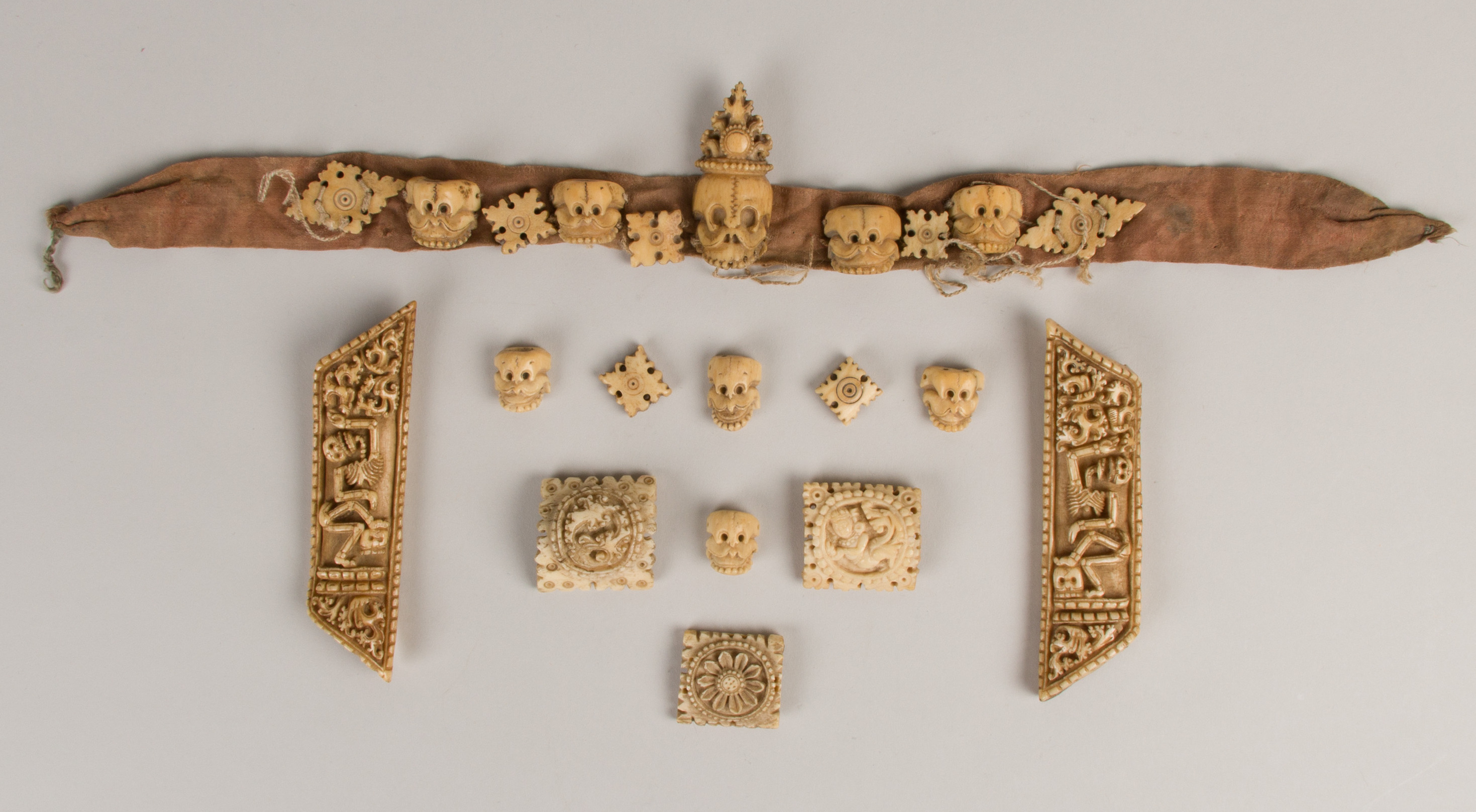
Bone fittings for a ritual apron

Oracles such as the Nechung or "Official State Oracle" have extremely elaborate costumes and other special ritual implements for giving their predictions. The costumes include much carved bone, as do some of those for performers in the cham dances and adepts in some tantric rituals. Apart from necklaces and other jewellery forms, there are "aprons" with bone plaques large enough to hold complex relief carvings.

Woodblock printing was used for both text and images, or a combination. This was both on paper for books or single sheets, or on textiles, where it was very widely used for prayer flags. As with the prayer wheels outside religious buildings, usually made of brass with the prayer inscribed in relief, setting the text in motion, whether by the wind in the case of flags, or by hand turning in the case of the wheels, was believed to increase the efficacy of the prayer or mantra. Designs including the Wind Horse are among the most popular. Usually, the design for the wooden block was drawn by a monk, but carving the block was done by lay craftspeople outside the monastery.

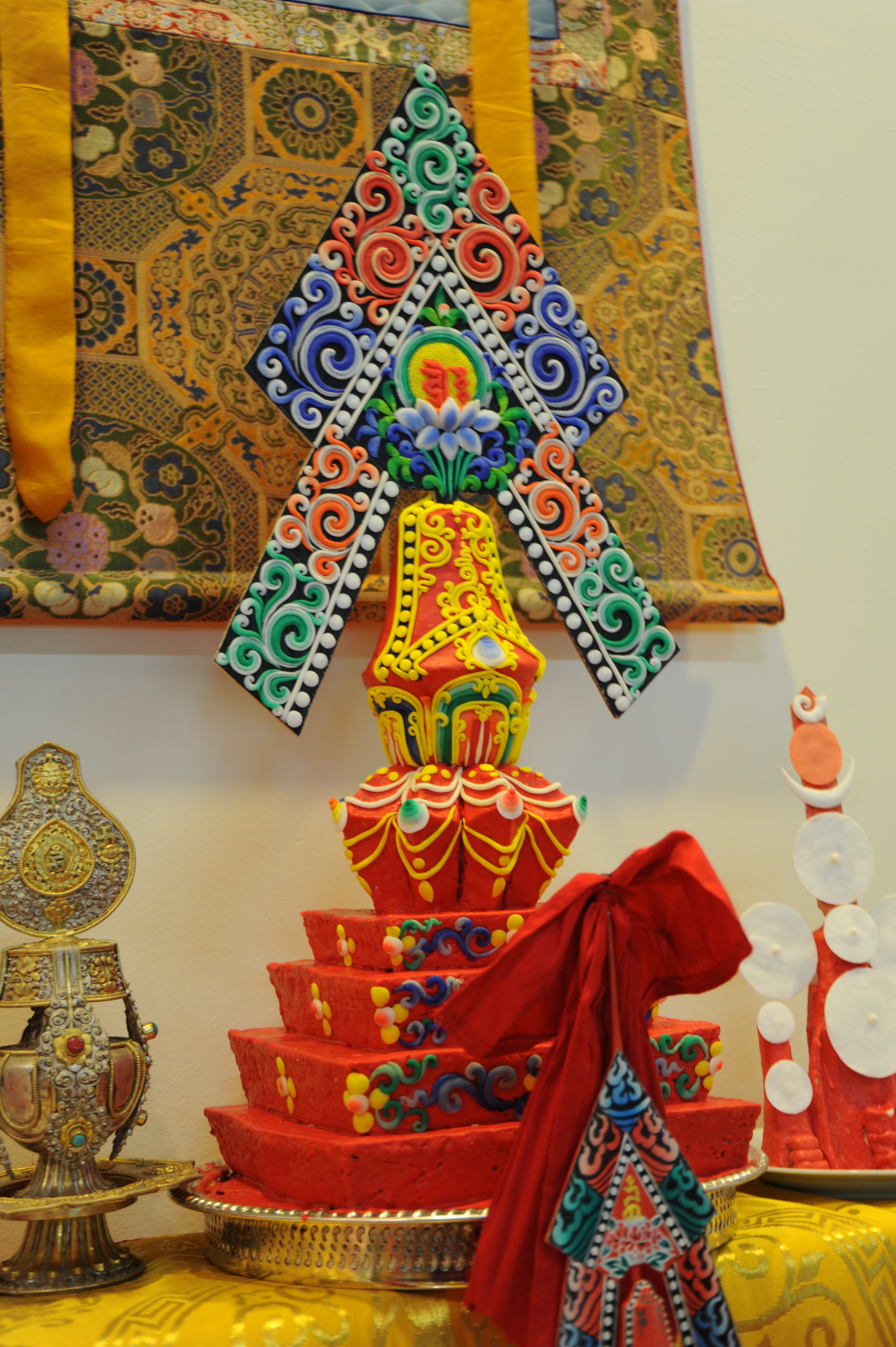
Torma in Vancouver

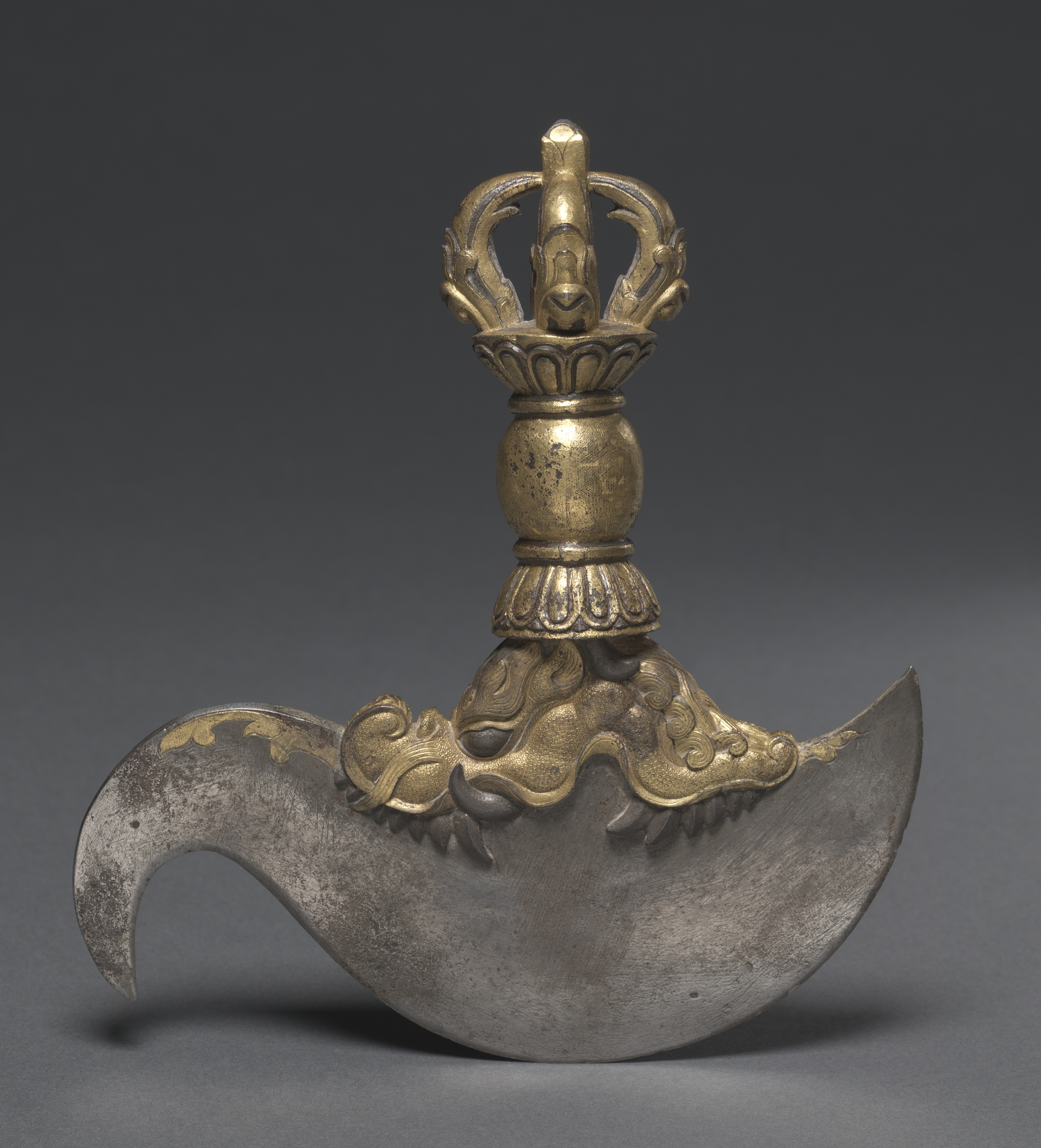
kartika flaying knife, with vajra handle, made in Beijing in 1407

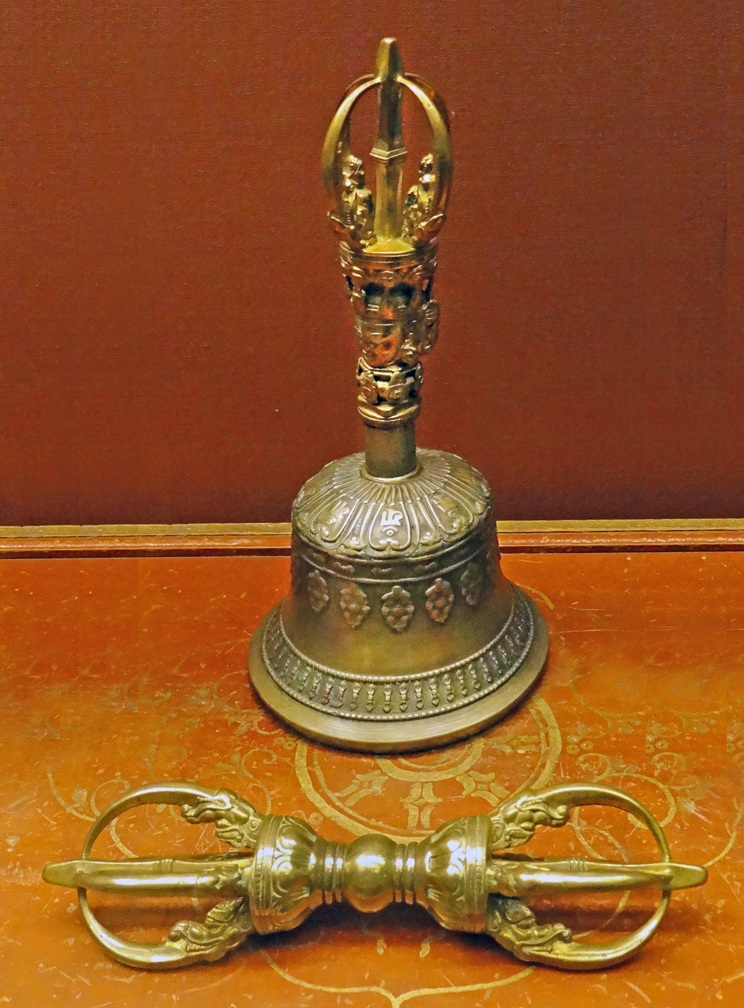
Vajra and bell, 18th-century

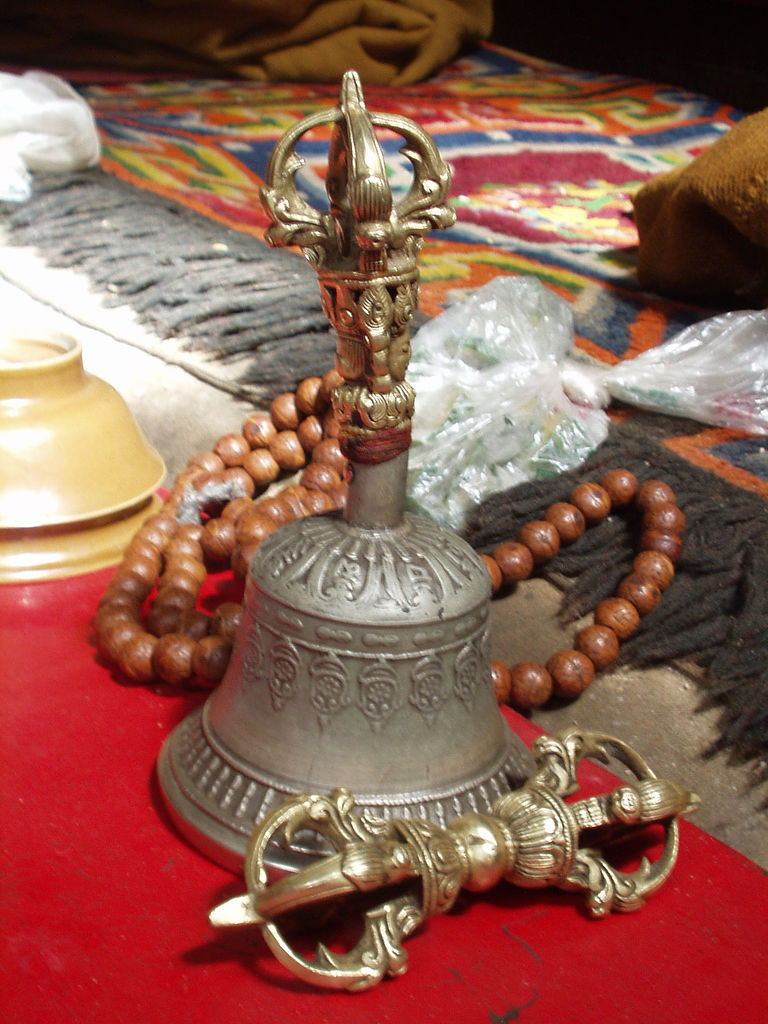
Dorje, ghantha (bell) and aksamala (prayer beads)

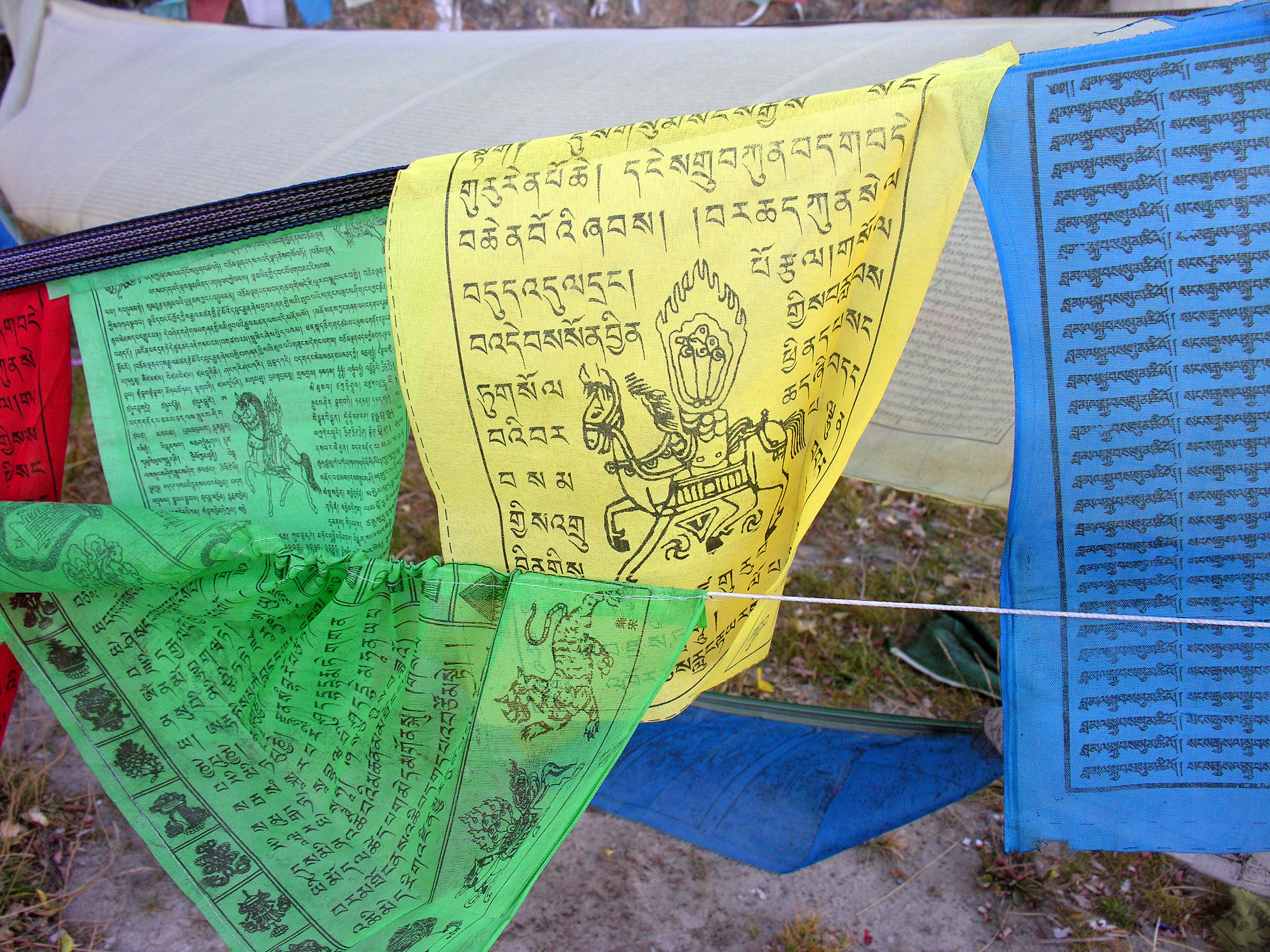
Printed prayer flags with the Wind Horse

== Secular art ==
Traditional Tibetan society had a relatively small but wealthy upper class, as well as prosperous merchants. These patronised the religious arts (most wealthy men had spent some of their youth in monastic training), but also the usual range of secular forms. Monasteries also contained secular art in such forms as woolen Tibetan rugs. The usual form of these before 1950 is the khaden or sleeping carpet, also used for sitting or meditating on, with either geometric of simple figural designs, the latter often versions of Chinese motifs. The imitation tiger-skin "tiger rug" at least began as a substitute for real tiger-skins, which Buddhist and Hindu tantric masters are often shown sitting on in Indian art, or wearing as a cloak. But it seems to have become a prestigious thing to sit on for all types of person.

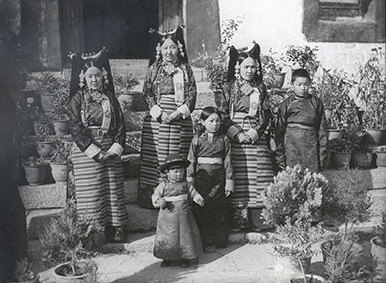
Some of the Tsarong family in Lhasa, 1936

Tibetan clothing for the wealthy was elaborate and very brightly coloured. Chinese silks were much used, and imitated locally. Otherwise women wore skirts of local hand-woven cloth with lines of different colours. The clothing of the poor in 19th-century photographs generally appears very ragged, at least for working men. Tibetan jewellery, worn in profusion by both sexes, was chunky rather than highly refined, usually mainly in silver. Turquoise was one of the gemstones mined in Tibet, and much used. Elite Tibetan women wore their hair elaborately tied high over the head on formal occasions, hanging jewellery on it. Various personal items such as saddles and horse trappings could be highly decorated in similar techniques. The chab chab, worn by women, is a brooch from which a set of small useful tools such as spoons, picks and knives hang by short chains. The chuckmuck, not exclusive to Tibet, is a fire-lighting kit, typically hung from the belt by a short strap. Thokcha are small amulets of various shapes made (or supposed to be made) from meteoric iron, which were in use well before Buddhism arrived.

Furniture, in recent centuries tending to loosely follow Chinese forms, can be very finely made, and are usually highly decorated. Caskets, boxes and covers for manuscripts and storage chests were also important. Tibetan horse trappings, arms and armour for the elite were often highly decorated; a reasonable number have survived because there was relatively little evolution in what was used for fighting until the 20th century, and also because items were given as votive offerings to monasteries.

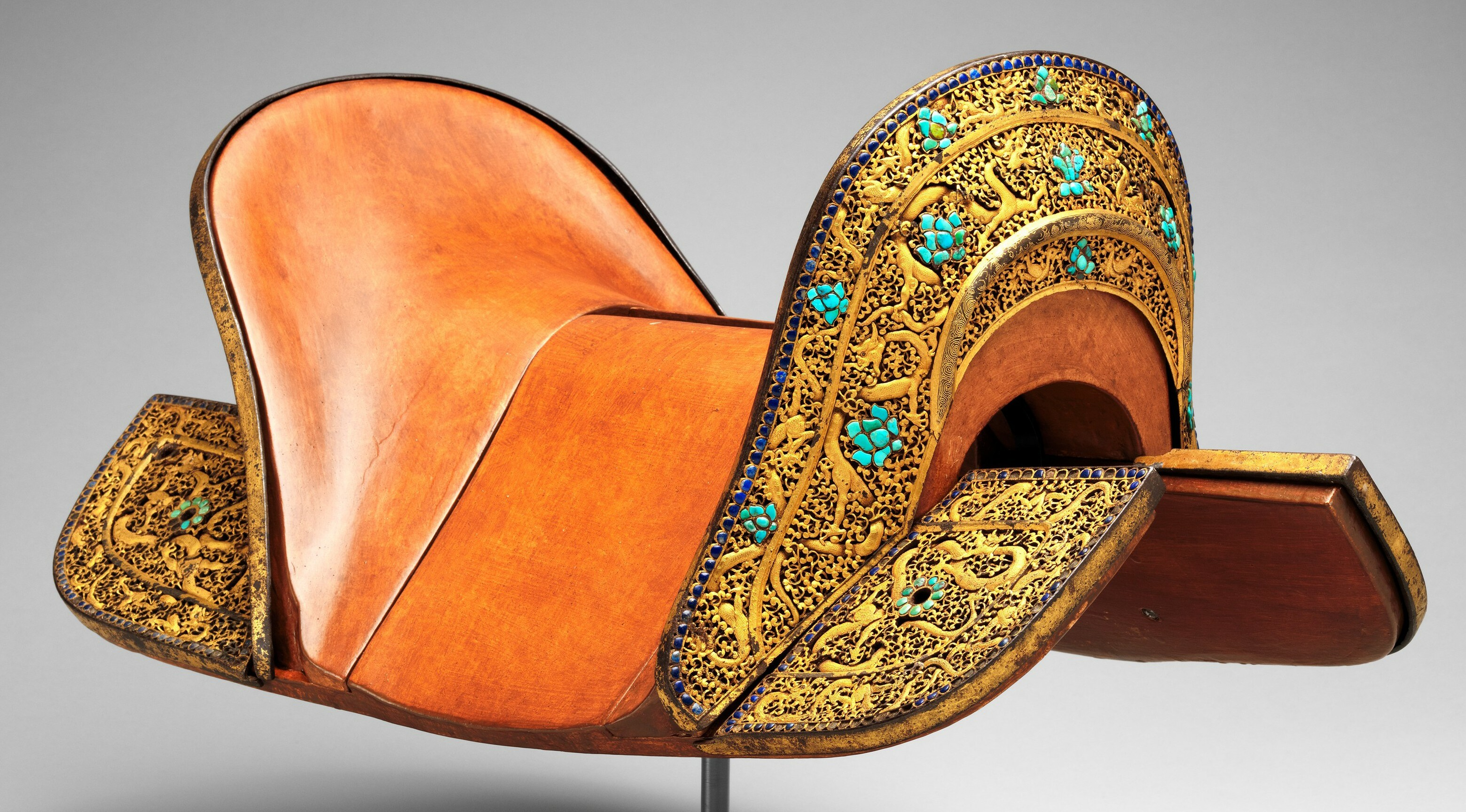
Set of plates for a saddle, c. 1400, in iron, gold, lapis lazuli, turquoise (and modern leather)

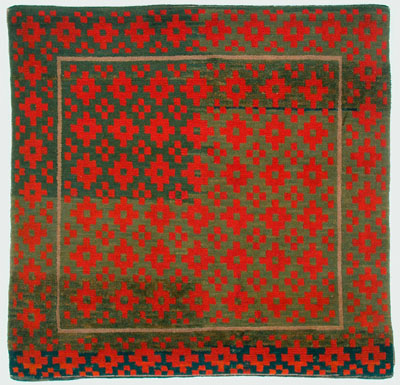
Small Tibetan sitting rug with traditional Gau (amulet) design, c. 1900

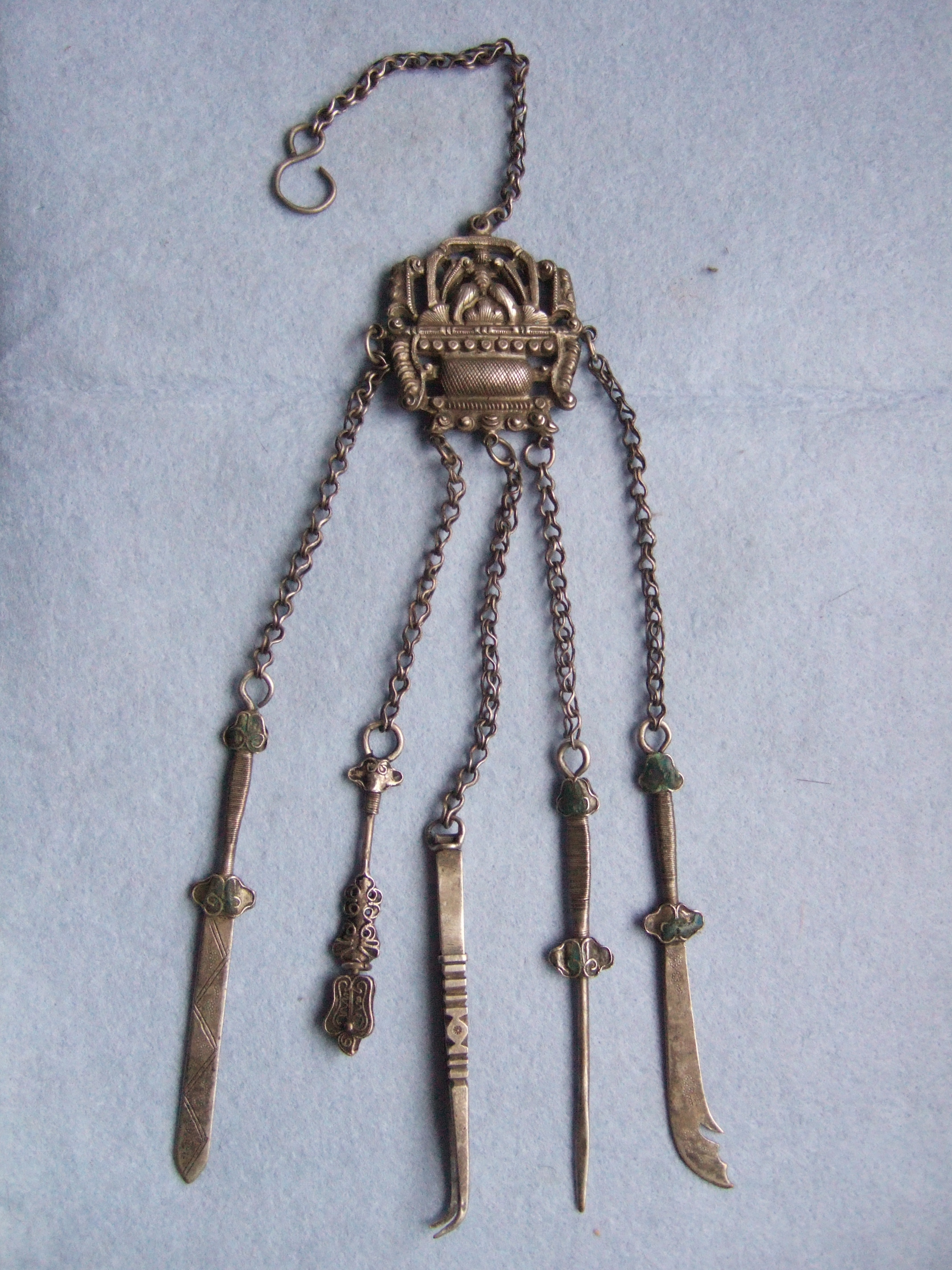
Silver Chab chab

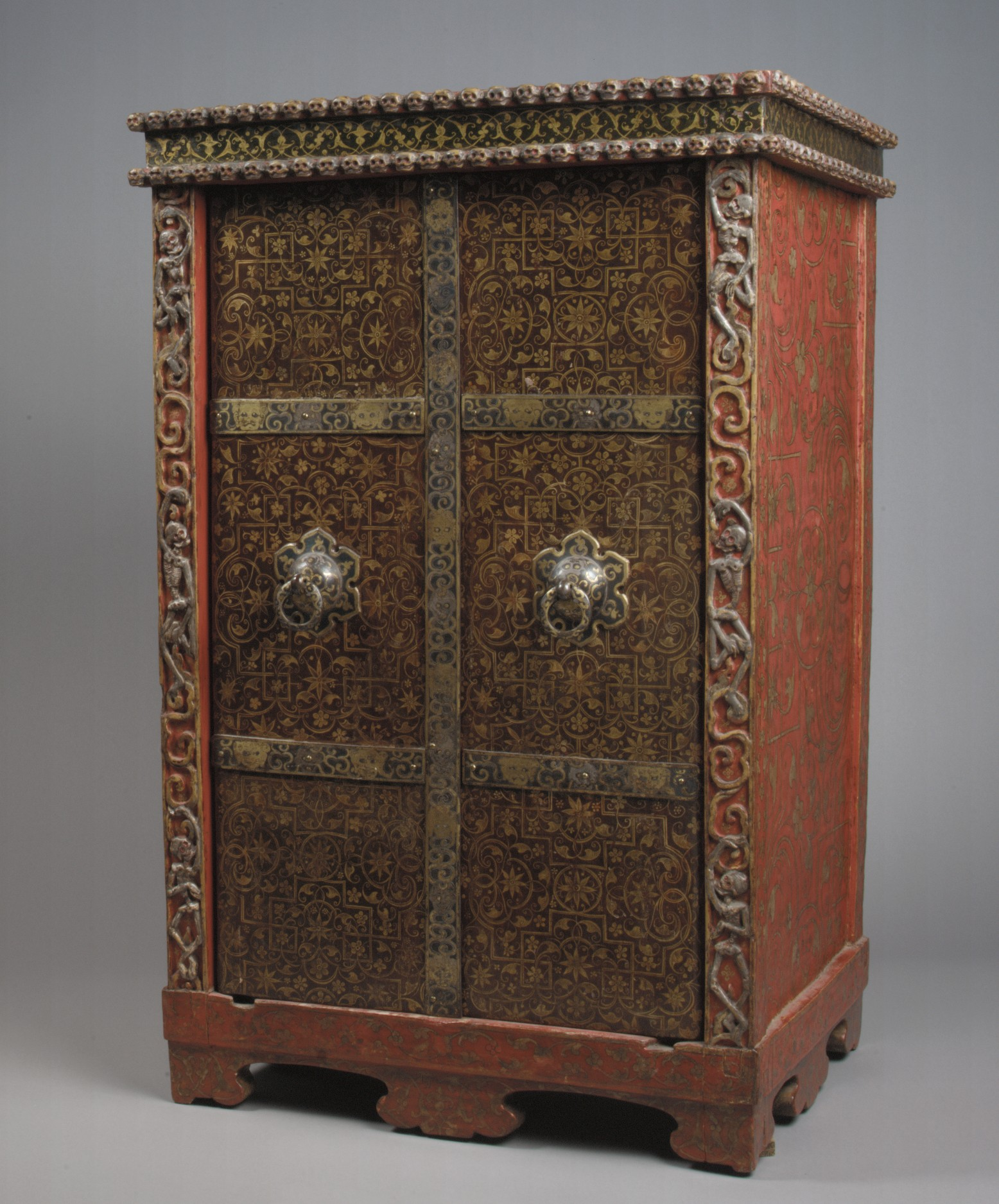
18th century cabinet, lacquer and gilding on wood, iron. The decoration includes skulls and skeletons.

== Buddhist iconography ==
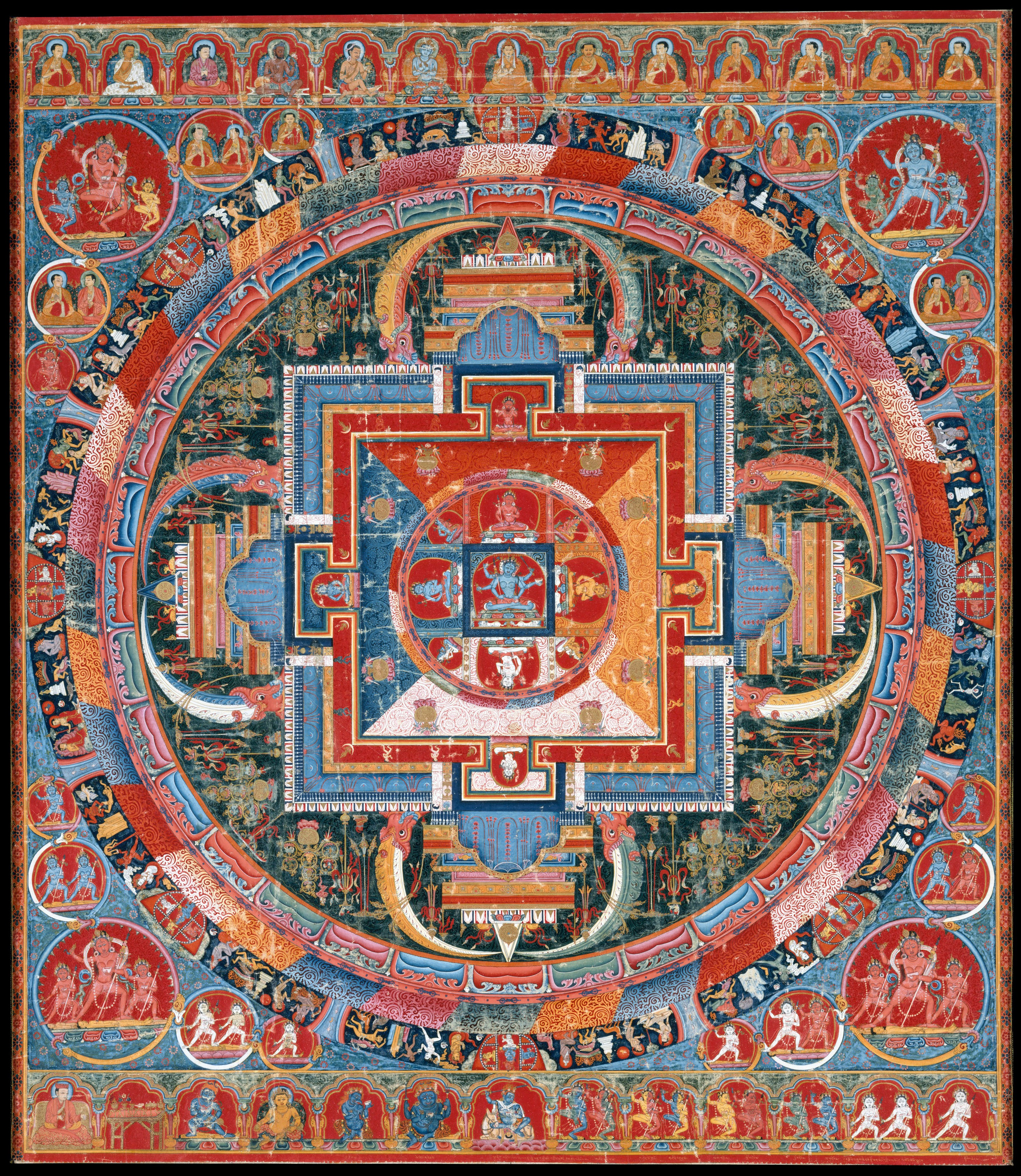
14th-century mandala of Jnanadakini. Thangka, 74.9 x 83.8 cm, perhaps painted in Tibet by a Nepali.

A high proportion of both thangkas and sculptures have as their main subject a single sacred figure, or two of them embracing in the yab-yum position. These are very often surrounded with other figures, much smaller, often representing a wide range of persons or qualities. Buddhist symbols often appear. The main figures are buddhas, bodisattvas, the various types of "deity" in Tibetan Buddhism, and sometimes distinguished monks of the past, who may be regarded as bodhisattvas. Very often the figures at the top represent the "lineage" of teachings relating to the main figure, including a mixture of semi-legendary early and foundational figures, and more recent monks.

Large numbers of these are yidams or meditation deities. The appearance of these and their surrounding elements is set out in great detail in texts, which the thangkas follow closely, and monks are required to memorize and meditate on these for very long periods. In many cases it is eventually explained to the initiate that the deity has no existence outside the mind of persons meditating on them, and the purpose of the exercise is to realize within the meditator the qualities the deity embodies, as part of the Buddhist practices of refuge and deity yoga.

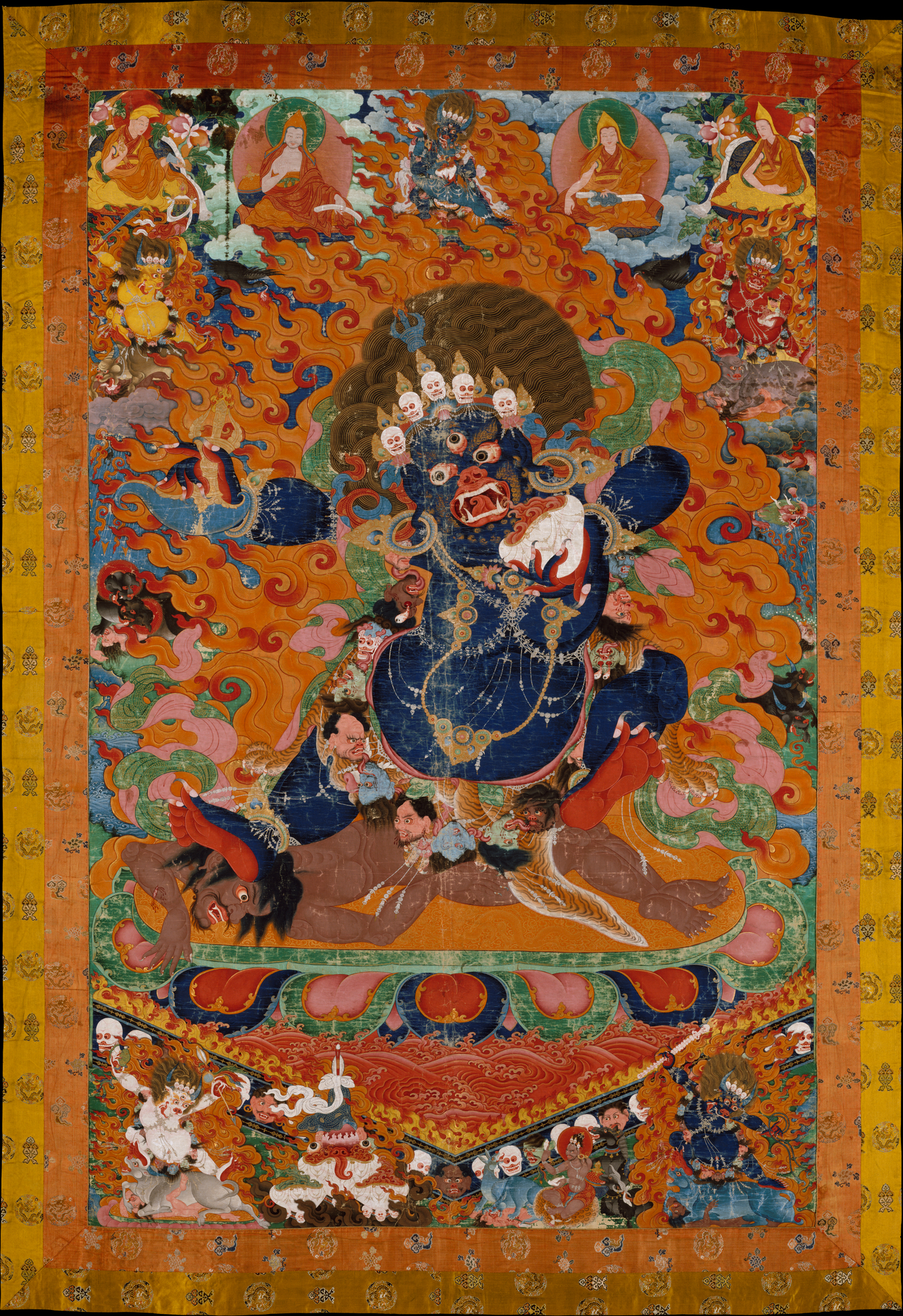
Yamāntaka, "destroyer of Death", a wrathful aspect of Mañjuśrī, the bodhisattva of wisdom, 18th century

Tibetan art is especially rich, compared to that of other Buddhist countries, in depictions of "fierce" figures, sometimes called a figure's "wrathful aspect" or "expression". These are to be understood as protective figures, versions of buddhas or bodhisattvas that can also be shown in their pacific aspect. Indeed, thanks to the very complex Tibetan understanding of their nature, important figures have a number of different "aspects", which may be depicted very differently. Sometimes these are shown in compartments around the edge of the composition. They are often depicted standing on much smaller figures personifying the malign forces they have overcome, and the skulls or heads of others may hang from their belt or neck as a mundamala or skull garland. There may also be skulls in their crown.

The foundation story of Tibetan Buddhism has much on early leaders, above all Padmasambhava, subduing evil spirits that previously dominated Tibet. The Dharmapala are one class of these fierce protectors, and one of them, Mahakala, was at various times given a particular role as the national protector, of Tibet and of the Mongol Empire. Tibetan Buddhism also arose and consolidated at the same time as Indian Buddhism declined, a process that is still rather unclear, but at times involved considerable violence, perhaps increasing the perceived need for powerful protective figures.

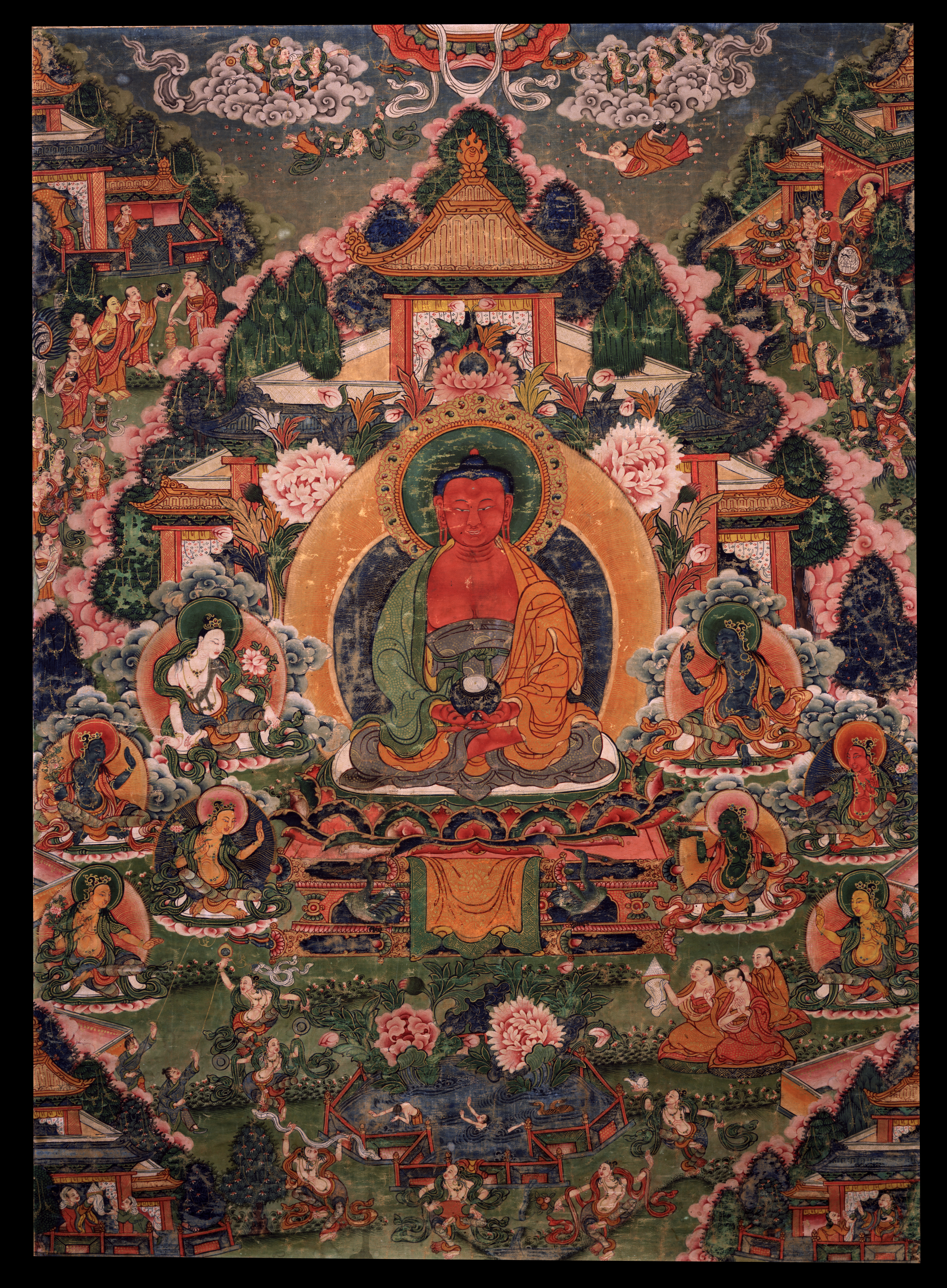
Amitabha in His Pure Land of Sukhavati, 18th-century.

Narrative depictions of the lives of religious figures are found in thangkas, usually with the various events shown around a much larger central figure. The life of Gautama Buddha is depicted, as well as his previous lives, but the other most important buddhas and bodhisattvas generally lack biographies. Tibetan figures such as Padmasambhava, Milarepa, and famous monks such as Sakya Pandita, and the Third Dalai Lama may be treated in a similar style. From the 18th century these scenes may be placed in a detailed landscape drawing on Chinese styles. Another style has a main central figure with much smaller portraits around the edge of the composition, either in compartments or in later examples in a landscape setting. These may be divine figures, or monks who were mentors or pupils.

Other portraits of monks are simpler, concentrating on the main figures. Some may date to the lifetime of the subject, though other are of figures long dead. It has been argued that portraits of living and dead figures are distinguished by the dead being shown seated on a lotus throne, but a recent study rejects this and instead argues that the side on which the tögag monastic robe is folded under the arm may indicate this. Small bronze sculpted portraits are also mostly straightforward, showing the subject seated on a base, not always wearing their ceremonial hat. One such bronze has an inscription saying it was made for the bedroom of a senior lama, perhaps the subject.

Another subject for thangkas is the various heavens or Pure lands of the main buddhas, especially Amitābha's Sukhavati, and the mystic earthly kingdom of Shambhala. In recent centuries, these have also been given panoramic landscape backgrounds. There are also paintings showing monasteries, usually concentrating on the buildings rather than the (often spectacular) settings.

The Ashtamangala, or "Eight Auspicious Symbols" very frequently appear in various contexts, for example held by figures. They belong to wider Buddhist traditions, and originated in India.

== Buddhist background ==
As Mahayana Buddhism emerged as a separate school in the 4th century AD, it emphasized the role of bodhisattvas, compassionate beings who forgo their personal escape to nirvana in order to assist others. From an early time, various bodhisattvas were also subjects of statuary art. Tibetan Buddhism, as an offspring of Mahayana Buddhism, inherited this tradition. But the additional dominating presence of the Vajrayana (or Buddhist tantra) may have had an overriding importance in the artistic culture. A common bodhisattva depicted in Tibetan art is the deity Chenrezig (Avalokitesvara), often portrayed as a thousand-armed saint with an eye in the middle of each hand, representing the all-seeing compassionate one who hears our requests. This deity can also be understood as a yidam, or 'meditation Buddha' for Vajrayana practice.

More specifically, Tibetan Buddhism contains Tantric Buddhism, also known as Vajrayana Buddhism for its common symbolism of the vajra, the diamond thunderbolt (known in Tibetan as the dorje). Most of the typical Tibetan Buddhist art can be seen as part of the practice of tantra. Vajrayana techniques incorporate many visualizations during meditation, and most of the elaborate tantric art can be seen as aids to these visualizations; from representations of meditational deities (yidams) to mandalas and all kinds of ritual implements. There are distinct tantric rituals, mostly originating in India, but some apparently incorporating elements from Tibetan shamanism. These are conducted alone or before a small group of initiates.

A surprising aspect of Tantric Buddhism is the common representation of wrathful deities, often depicted with angry faces, circles of flame, or with the skulls of the dead. These images represent the Protectors (Skt. dharmapala) and their fearsome bearing belies their true compassionate nature. Actually their wrath represents their dedication to the protection of the dharma teaching as well as to the protection of the specific tantric practices to prevent corruption or disruption of the practice. They are most importantly used as wrathful psychological aspects that can be used to conquer the negative attitudes of the practitioner.

== Bön ==
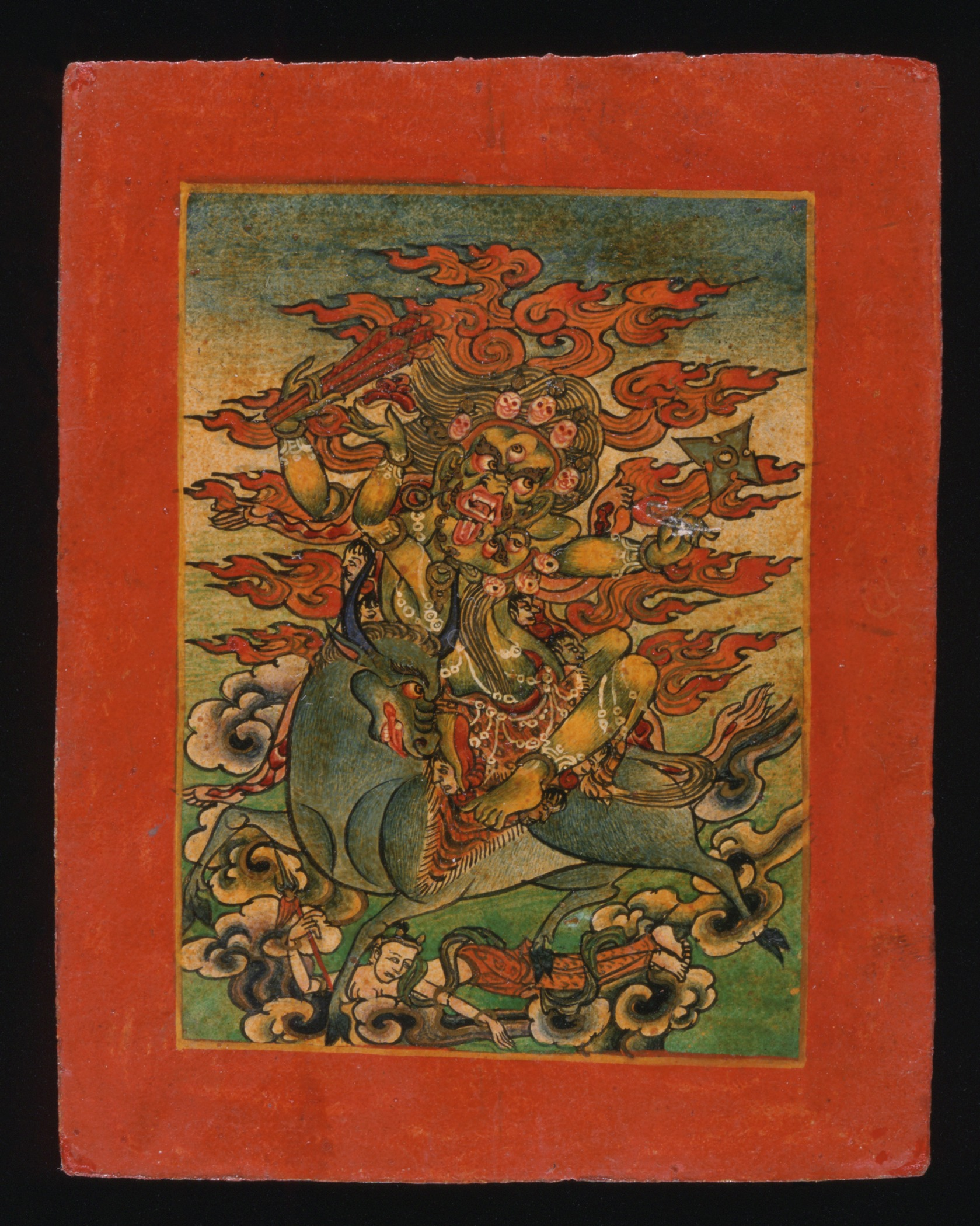
Described by LACMA as "Yellow Yama (?) and Consort on Bull, Nyingmapa Buddhist or Bon Ritual Card" (tsakli), 18th or 19th century.

The indigenous shamanistic religion of the Himalayas is known as Bön, which has survived in a monastic form, co-existing with Tibetan Buddhism, and producing similar art. Bon contributes a pantheon of local tutelary deities to Tibetan art. In Tibetan temples (known as lhakhang), statues of the Buddha or Padmasambhava are often paired with statues of the tutelary deity of the district who often appears angry or dark. These gods once inflicted harm and sickness on the local citizens but after the arrival of Padmasambhava these negative forces have been subdued and now must serve Buddha.

Bon images are often extremely similar to Tibetan Buddhist ones, especially those produced by the Nyingma order, which has the closest connections with Bon monasticism. Indeed, even experts are sometimes unable to be sure for which religion some works were produced. Other works depict the distinct Bon deities and historic teachers, but remain generally close to Buddhist styles; there was evidently considerable interchange between artists in both traditions. In general, Bon sacred figures do not appear in the complicated different forms and aspects of Buddhist ones, and a Bon fierce protective deity is likely only to have that form. Some differences are easier to see: Bon art uses the swastika rather than the vajra as a symbol of wisdom, and although their chorten (stupas) are "almost identical", Bon devotees walk round them in the opposite direction (anti-clockwise) to Buddhists.

== Historical background ==
=== First transmission ===
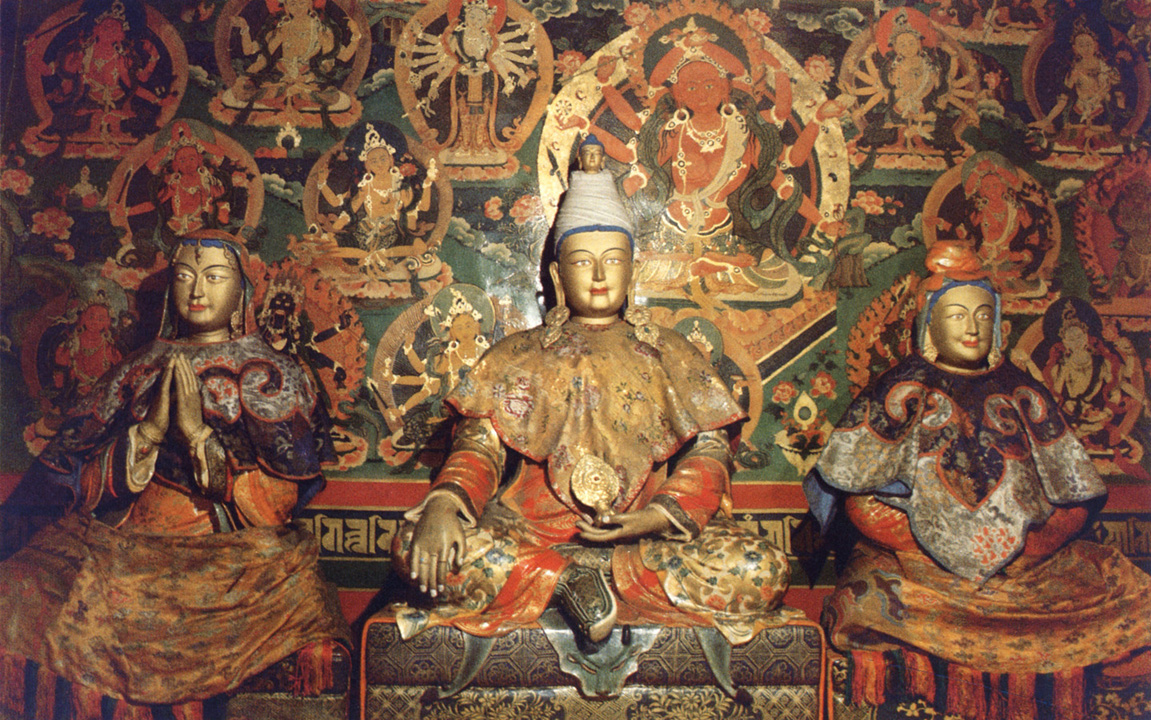
From left: Bhrikuti Devi of Nepal, King Songtsen Gampo, Princess Wencheng, Potala, perhaps 830s.

Pre-Buddhist art in Tibet is relatively little understood, apart from small personal items such as thokcha amulets, and prehistoric rock carvings of animals. All are hard to date. Stylistically, Buddhist art tends to be divided, at some periods more than others, into that from Western, Central and Eastern Tibet.

Buddhism achieved its final very strong position in Tibet in several stages, with reverses sometimes following periods of strong growth. The first arrival of Buddhism was traditionally with the two princesses, Nepali and Chinese, who came to marry King Songsten Gampo (reigned c. 627–649). Each came with monks and statues, and both Indian and Chinese styles of Buddhism (both Mahayana, but already somewhat divergent) were encouraged by the court. The core of the Jokhang in Lhasa survives from this period, and the Chinese Jowo statue, but Buddhism was essentially a court religion for some time after, and whether any Tibetan art survives is uncertain.

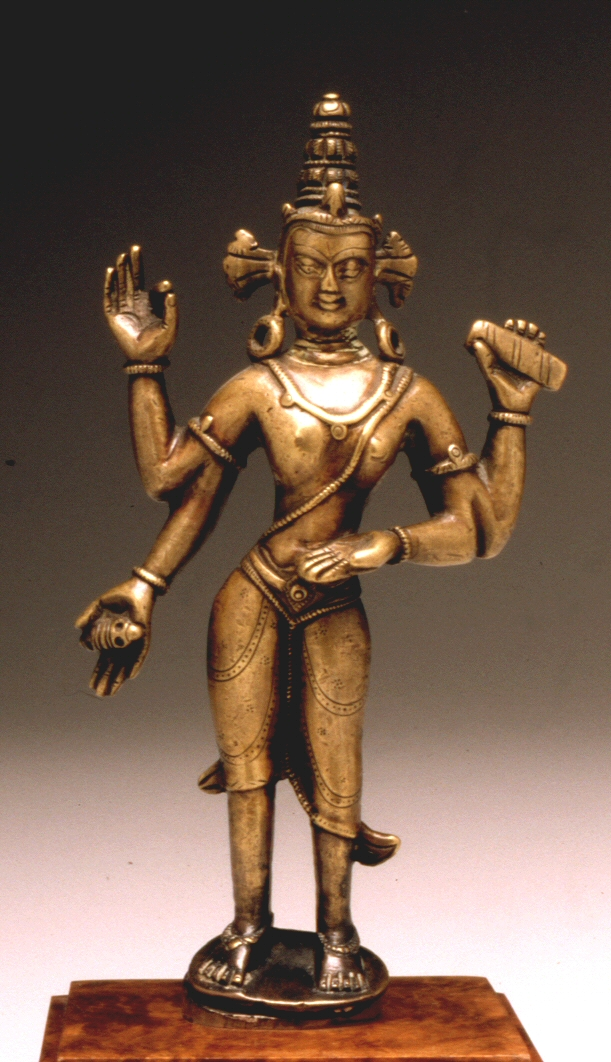
The bodhisattva Manjushri, between 1000 and 1200

Songsten Gampo was the first of the "Three Religious Kings" (or "Dharma Kings"), followed by Trisong Detsen and Tri Relwajen, who reigned until about 836 (there are, or may have been, several intervening kings). King Trisong Detsen invited the Indian monk Śāntarakṣita, of Nalanda, who arrived in 761, but whose efforts were, according to Tibetan tradition, frustrated by evil native spirits. After retreating, and spending some years in Nepal, Śāntarakṣita returned with the Tantric adept Padmasambhava, who successfully defeated the evil spirits.

In 791 Buddhism was declared the official religion, and King Trisong Detsen eventually felt he had to make a choice between the Indian and Chinese styles of Buddhism. After hearing both groups of monks making their case, he chose the Indian ones, perhaps for political reasons, and thereafter Sanskrit texts have always been regarded in Tibet as the proper foundation for Buddhism. By this time some large monasteries had been built, and the Tibetan Empire had begun to encroach on China's western borders; the Tibetan paintings found in Dunhuang are one major group of survivals. This period of expansion was soon followed by the Era of Fragmentation after 842, which saw the end of the unified kingdom, and much tension between Bon and Buddhism, which declined severely, especially in Central Tibet.

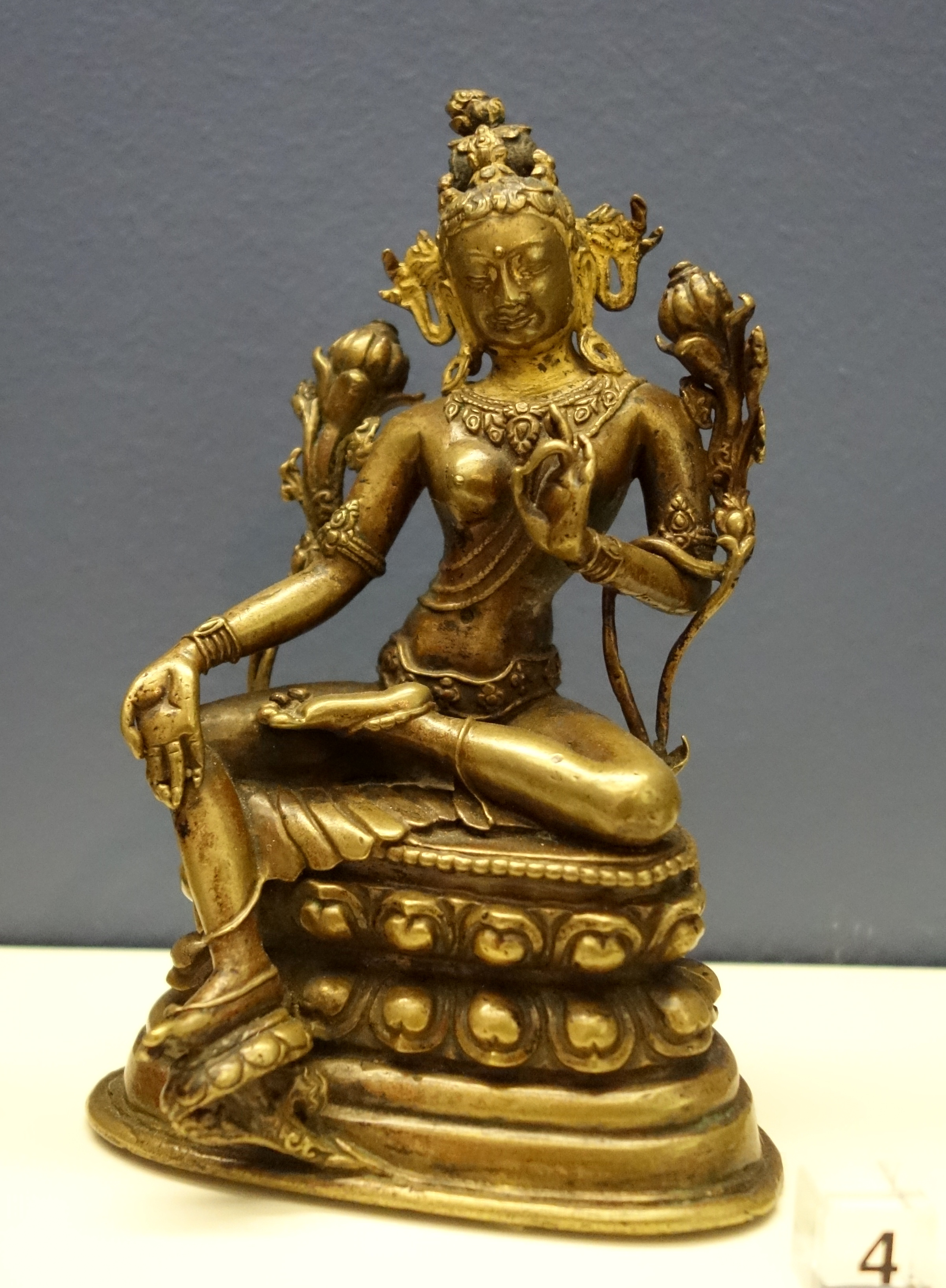
Green Tara, 12th century

=== Second Transmission ===
The "Later" or "Second Transmission" began under King Yeshe-Ö of the Guge Kingdom in Western Tibet, who succeeded in getting the senior Indian monk Atisha to come to Tibet in 1042. Spreading over the next decades from Western to Eastern Tibet, Atisha and successors such as Dromtön and Marpa Lotsawa established many monasteries, and new orders of monks.

At this period Indian Buddhism was still a force in north-east India, though in decline, with large monastic complexes such as Nalanda in Bengal and modern Bihar, to the south of the region around Lhasa. There were considerable monastic interchanges between the two regions, with texts being taken north for copying and translating, and also evidently movement of artworks and probably artists. A greater number of Tibetan works have survived, many showing accomplished styles, with considerable Indian influence. Apart from portable works, the two outstanding survivals in wall paintings are the monasteries of Tabo and Alchi in modern Ladakh in India, relatively small establishments in Guge which largely escaped later rebuilding and repainting, and Chinese destruction.

The dominant type of monastic Buddhism in north-west India at the time was Vajrayana (or Tantric Buddhism, Esoteric Buddhism), and various sub-schools of this tradition became the norm in Tibet. Over the next century a number of monastic orders or schools emerged, the four major schools, with their approximate dates of foundation, being the Nyingma (c. 8th century), Kagyu (11th century), Sakya (1073), and Gelug (1409). These came to produce art with slight differences in both subject-matter and style.

=== Mongol gold ===
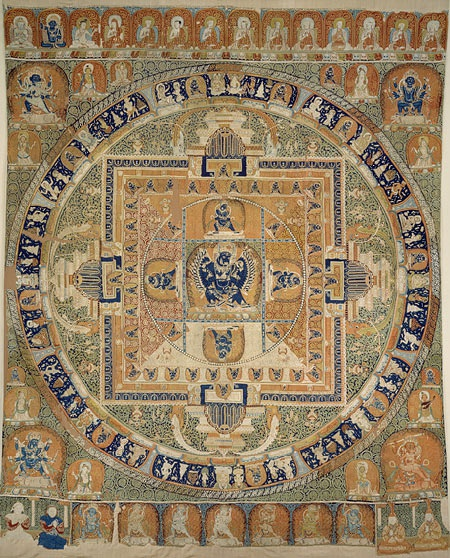
Vajrabhairava mandala thangka in silk kesi tapestry, for the Yuan imperial family, whose portraits are along the bottom. Woven in China, c. 1330–32, doubtless to a design by a monk in the imperial workshop. 245.5 x 209 cm.

The situation transformed dramatically in the second half of the 13th century, as the protracted process of the Mongol conquest of China (1215–1294) drew to a close. Tibetan Buddhism had made considerable inroads in Mongolia, and became the official state religion of the new Mongol Yuan dynasty under Kublai Khan, though other religions were (most of the time) tolerated and sometimes patronized. Drogön Chögyal Phagpa (1235–1280), leader of the Sakya order, was made Imperial Preceptor and head of the new Bureau of Buddhist and Tibetan Affairs. Over the next century monastic Buddhism received "massive financial and material support by the Yuan state (1260-1368), most prominently in the form of several tons of gold and silver, and hundreds of thousands of bolts of silk".

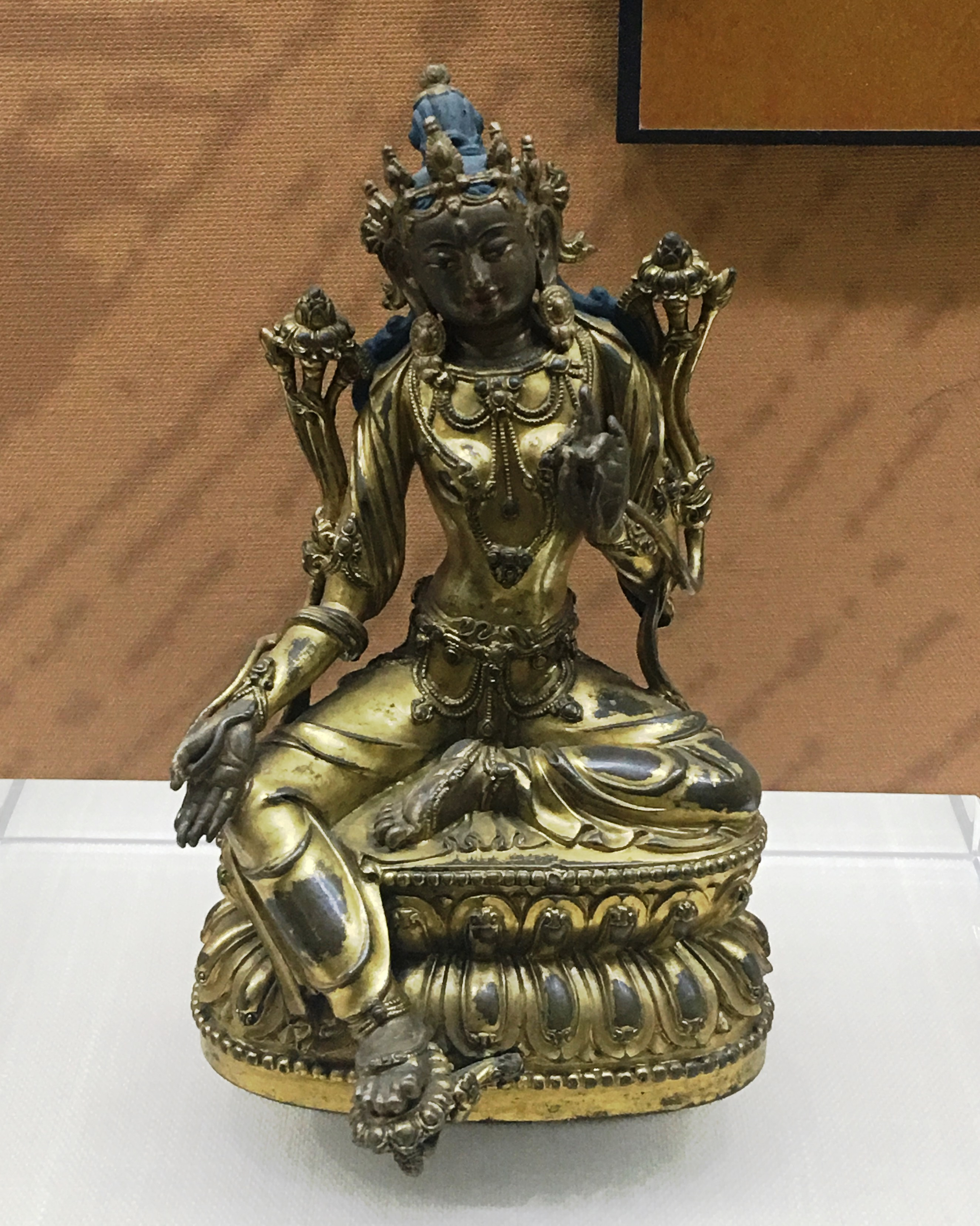
Green Tara from the Great Lama Temple Beijing, Yongle period, 1403-1424

Tibetan monasteries were established in China, mostly staffed by monks from Tibet. A large number of imperial ceremonies using the monks were established—a reform in 1331 reduced the number from 216 to 200 annually. Each of these might last several days, a "short" one taking a hundred monks for seven days, while a long one used forty monks for three years. These were lavishly rewarded: one seven day ritual was paid for with 600 kilos of silver. Large donations were used for building monasteries in Tibet, or commissioning art, but donations were also given to large numbers of individual monks, who might use them to make art. The Sakya order were the largest beneficiaries, but all orders benefited.

The Yuan emperors maintained large imperial workshops, whose main task was producing Buddhist images and designs for them. About half of the senior artists were Newari or Tibetan, with the rest Chinese. Drawings of the design were typically approved by members of the court and the Imperial Preceptor, who checked the details of the iconography were correct. Often old pieces were copied, and creatively reinterpreted. The Yuan empresses were especially fond of silver statues of female deities, most of which were melted down at some later point, as few of them survive. The records show that in 1329, the year after she became empress during a brief civil war, Budashiri, wife of the Wenzong Emperor, commissioned goddess figures that used a total of 2,220 kilos of silver.

Although the next Ming dynasty presented itself as a native Chinese dynasty expelling the foreign Mongol overlords, the founder, the Hongwu Emperor (r. 1368–1398) had spent several years in a Chinese Buddhist monastery, and he and his successors continued to patronize Tibetan Buddhism, if not on as extravagant a scale as the Yuan. It suited Chinese governments to keep their neighbour to the West peaceful and largely devoted to religion; when necessary the Chinese intervened militarily in the sometimes fierce disputes between the different orders. The next Qing dynasty were Manchus, who kept their elite separate from the Han Chinese. They were largely Tibetan Buddhists, with the older traditions of Manchu shamanism still strong, and continued to patronize Tibetan Buddhism in China and Tibet until the end of imperial rule.

== Collecting ==
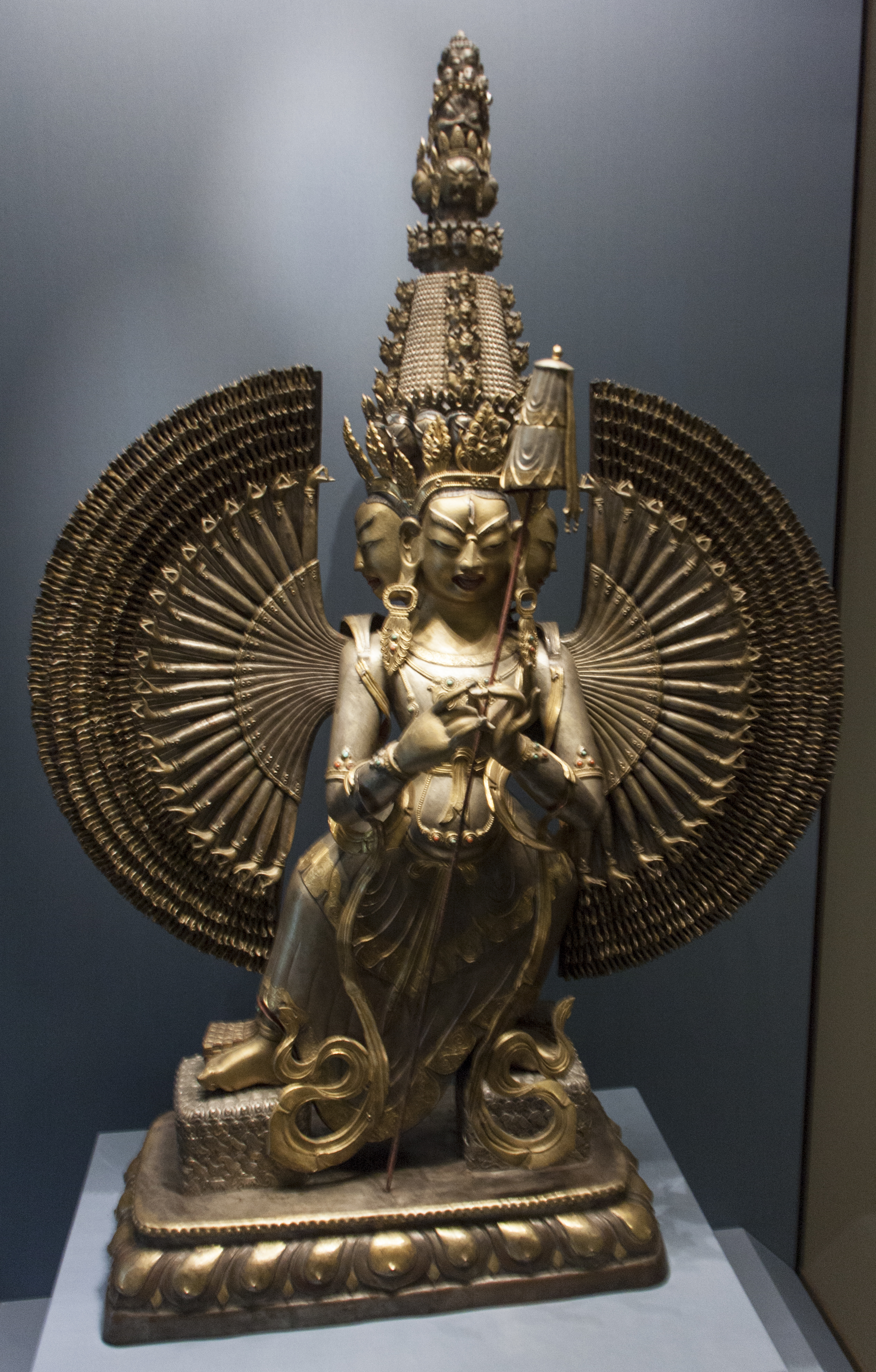
Usnisasitatapatra, Mongolian, 18th century, Hermitage Museum, from the Ukhtomsky collection

There was relatively little Tibetan art outside the country until the end of the 19th century, except that in the Chinese imperial collections and in Tibetan monasteries in China. The first significant foreign collector was Prince Esper Ukhtomsky (1861–1921), a Russian author, publisher and Oriental enthusiast, with close access to the court. Ukhtomsky was strongly attracted to Asian art on aesthetic grounds, and eventually declared himself a Buddhist. During his travels in Tibet and Central Asia he amassed a large collection of Chinese and Tibetan art, that eventually numbered over 2,000 pieces.

In 1902 the collection was given to the Ethnographical Department of the Russian Museum in St. Petersburg. In 1933 it was divided between the Hermitage Museum, who received the largest and best share, and the Museum of the History of Religion, both in what was then Leningrad. The Hermitage's share remains the basis of "one of the world's largest collections of Tibetan art". Unlike most Western museums, whose collections tend to be stronger in objects from southern and western Tibet, the Ukhtomsky collection is strongest in objects from northern and eastern Tibet, making it especially valuable.

In 1911, the Newark Museum in Newark, New Jersey, United States displayed the world's first exhibition dedicated to Tibetan art. The museum continued to add more artifacts until the 1940s, amassing more than 5,000 pieces in its collection including paintings, sculptures, ritual objects, fine textiles and decorative arts. Today the museum houses over 5,500 Tibetan art artifacts, the largest and most distinctive in the Western Hemisphere, in eight permanent galleries with a Tibetan Buddhist altar as its centerpiece. The altar was consecrated in 1990 by the 14th Dalai Lama in 1990.

The upheavals in Tibet and China in the 20th century brought about large movements of portable art to the West, and the destruction of most that remained in the country. There was large-scale destruction during and after the invasion and annexation of Tibet by the People's Republic of China in 1950 to 1951, the Cultural Revolution of 1966 to 1976, and at other times.

While wall paintings, large altar statues and other large art could usually not be moved, and a high proportion were destroyed, smaller thangka and bronzes were relatively easy to carry and left the country in large numbers. These were also the types of objects that probably had the greatest appeal to Western collectors, and were still relatively cheap in the mid-century. Several important private collections were formed, many of which subsequently passed to museums in the West, a process still continuing. The art historical understanding of Tibetan art, and its dating and regional differences also continues to develop.

Apart from museum collections in Tibet, China, St. Petersburg and Newark, many of the larger Western museums have significant collections, though most thangkas and textiles are not on permanent display for conservation reasons. Dedicated museums for Tibetan art in the West are the Rubin Museum of Art and Jacques Marchais Museum of Tibetan Art, both in New York City, and the Museum of Contemporary Tibetan Art in the Netherlands.

== Contemporary Tibetan art ==
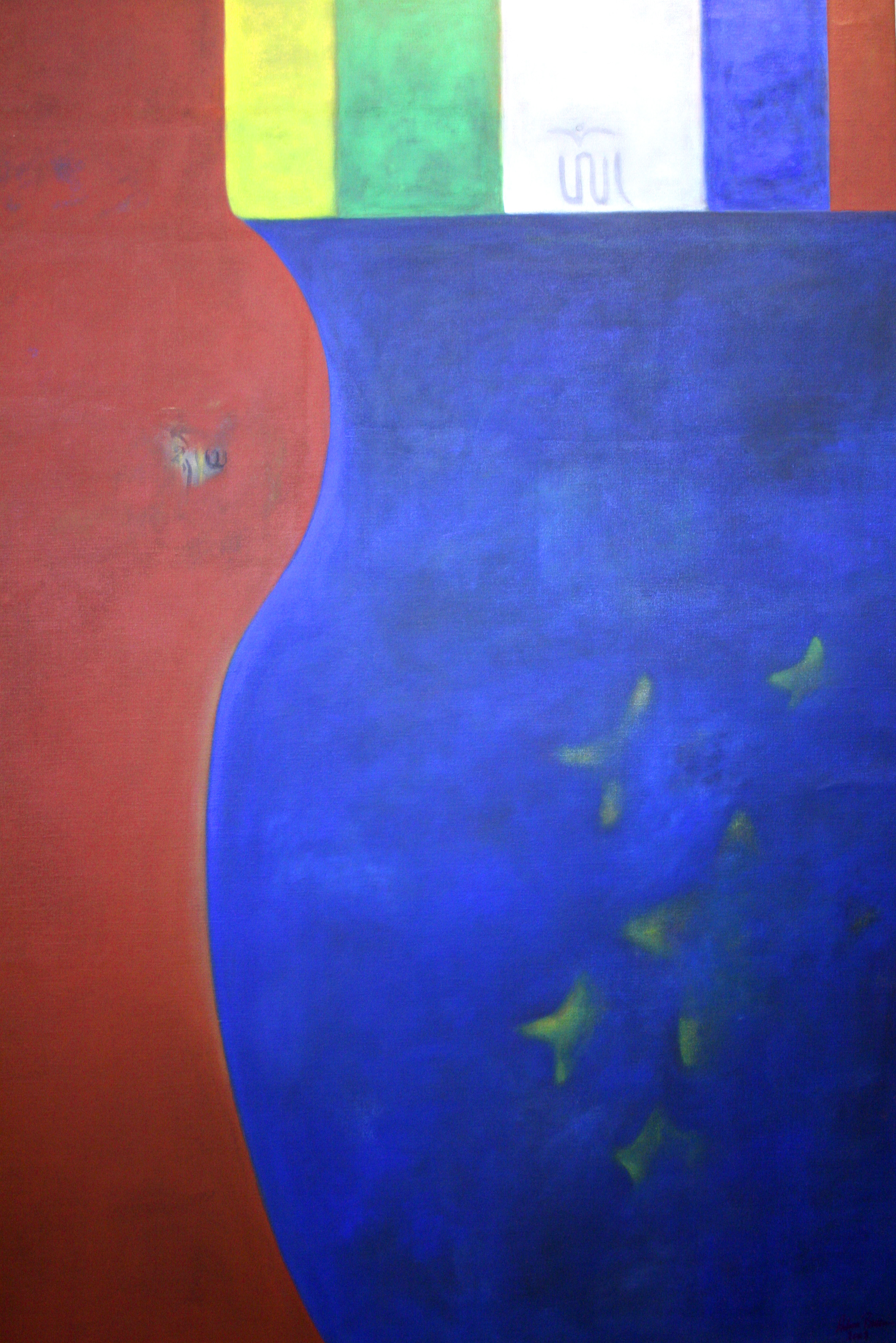
Painting by Sonam Dolma Brauen, 2008 "visionary artists for tibet" exhibition

Contemporary Tibetan art refers to the art of modern Tibet, or Tibet after 1950. It can also refer to art by the Tibetan diaspora, which is explicitly political and religious in nature. Contemporary Tibetan art includes modern thangka (religious scroll paintings) that resemble ancient thangka, as well as radical, avant-garde, works. Many artists, especially in monasteries, continue to produce traditional Tibetan styles, which are preferred for religious use, and also have markets inside and outside the Tibetan diaspora.

Popular Contemporary Tibetan artists include Karma Phuntsok, Tibetan-Swiss painter Sonam Dolma Brauen and Jamyang Dorjee Chakrishar.

== See also ==
- Architecture of Tibet
- Dzong architecture (Bhutan)
- Kurkihar hoard
