= Thangka =

Tibetan Buddhist painting

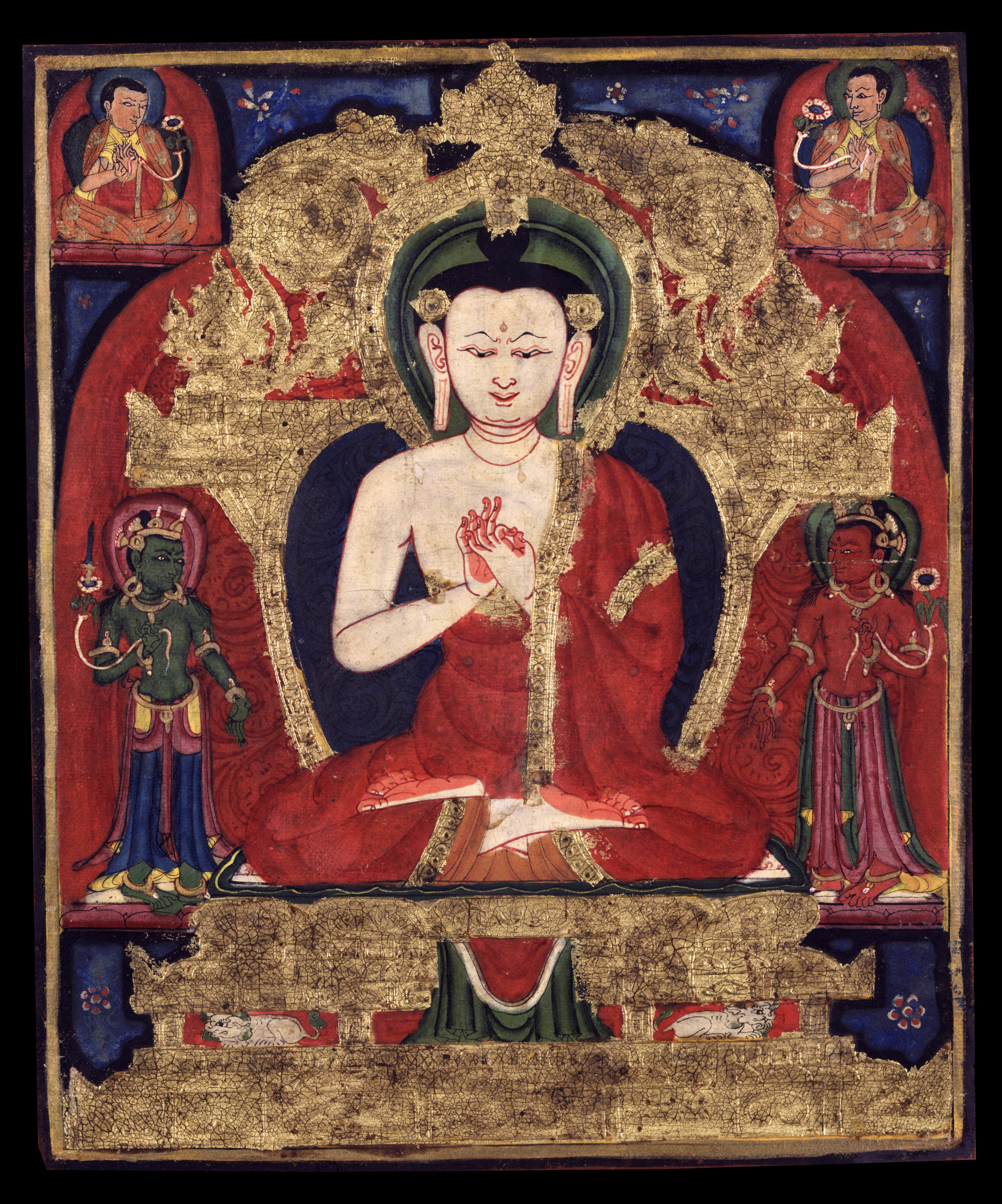
Buddha Vairocana, the “Resplendent One”. Pigments on cloth, 14th century

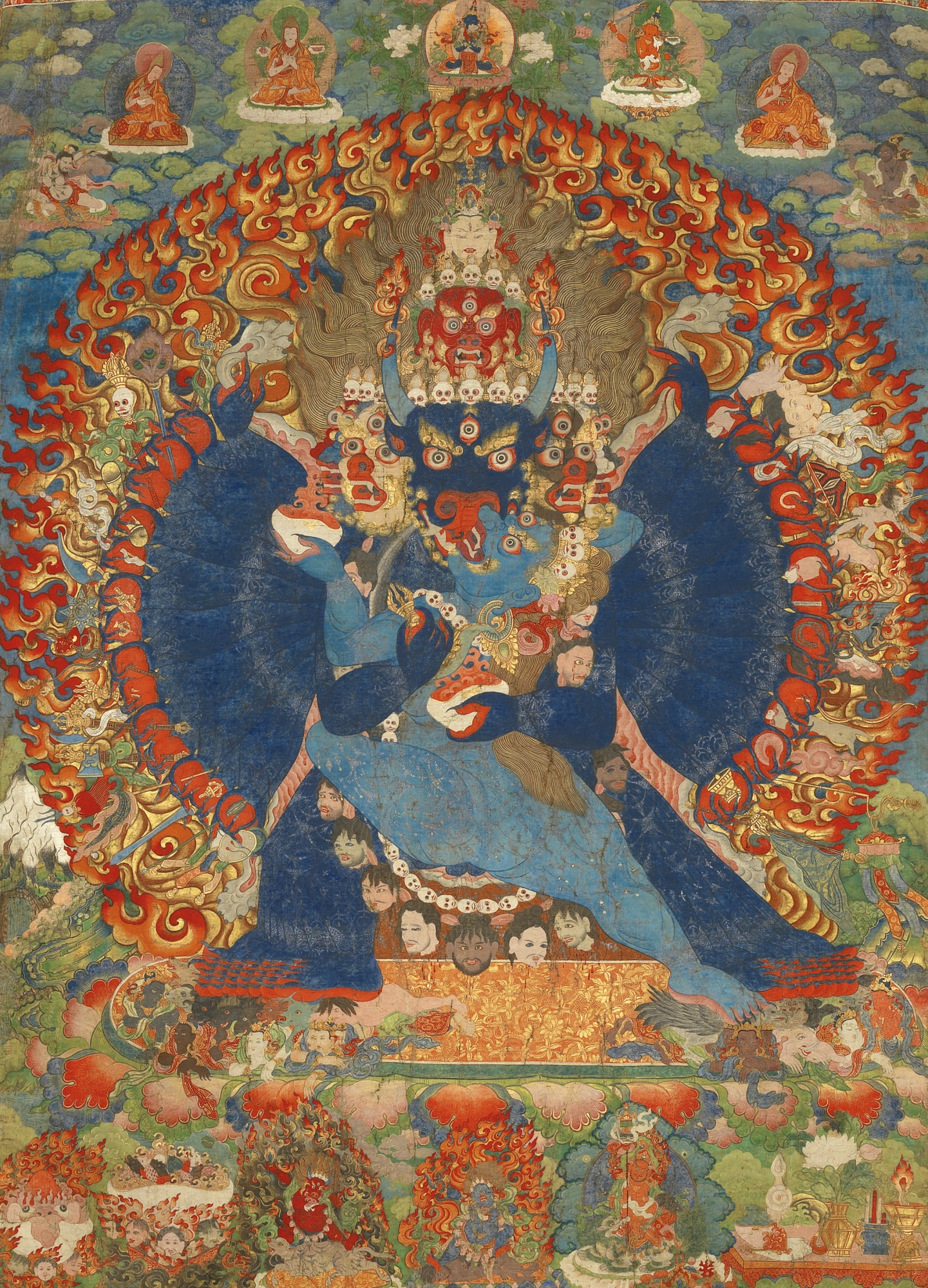
Thangka depicting Vajrabhairava, c. 1740

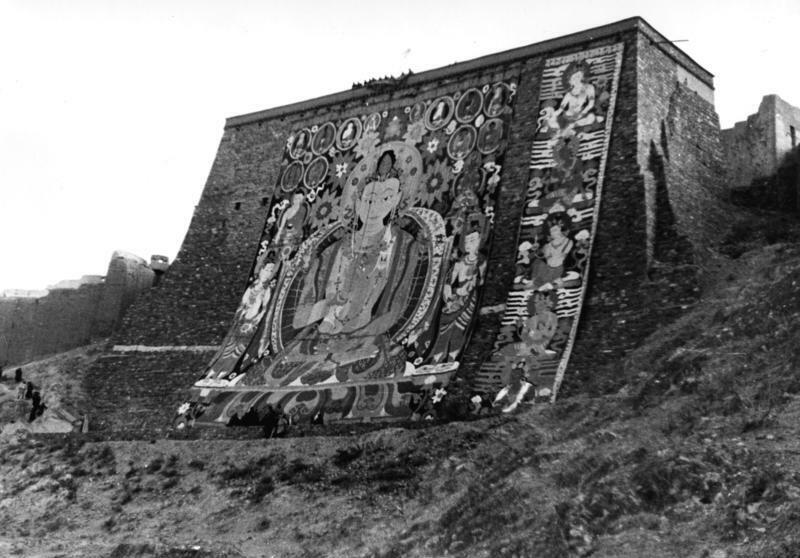
A large thangka hung on a special wall at Gyantse in Tibet in 1938

A thangka painting (Nepali pronunciation: [ˈt̪ʰaŋka]; Tibetan: ཐང་ཀ་; Nepal Bhasa: पौभा) is a Tibetan Buddhist painting on cotton, silk appliqué, usually depicting a Buddhist deity, scene, or mandala. Thangkas are traditionally kept unframed and rolled up when not on display, mounted on a textile backing somewhat in the style of Chinese scroll paintings, with a further silk cover on the front. So treated, thangkas can last a long time, but because of their delicate nature, they have to be kept in dry places where moisture will not affect the quality of the silk. Most thangkas are relatively small, comparable in size to a western half-length portrait, but some are extremely large, several metres in each dimension; these were designed to be displayed, typically for very brief periods on a monastery wall, as part of religious festivals. Most thangkas were intended for personal meditation or instruction of monastic students. They often have elaborate compositions including many very small figures. A central deity is often surrounded by other identified figures in a symmetrical composition. Narrative scenes are less common, but do appear.

Thangka serve as important teaching tools depicting the life of the Buddha, various influential lamas and other deities and bodhisattvas. One subject is the Wheel of Life (Bhavachakra), which is a visual representation of the Abhidharma teachings (Art of Enlightenment). The term may sometimes be used of works in other media than painting, including reliefs in metal and woodblock prints. Today, printed reproductions at poster size of painted thangka are commonly used for devotional as well as decorative purposes. Many thangkas were produced in sets, though they have often subsequently become separated.

== History ==
Tibetan Buddhist painting developed from widespread traditions of early Buddhist paintings which now only survive in a few sites such as the Ajanta Caves in India and the Mogao Caves in China, which have very extensive wall-paintings and were the repository for what are now the earliest surviving Tibetan paintings on cloth. The thanka form developed alongside the tradition of Tibetan Buddhist wall paintings, which are or were mostly in monasteries.

The early history of the form is more easily traced through these murals, which survive in greater numbers than the portable paintings which certainly once existed. The art form originating from the Newari art of Phauba from Nepal, from the early years artists were commissioned from Nepal, furthermore, ancient texts have been found wherein instructions were provided as to the proportions, postures and geometrical measurements of these deities to the monasteries from Nepal. Most thanka were commissioned by individuals, who were believed to acquire merit by doing so. They might then be given to a monastery or another individual, or retained for use by the commissioner. Some thangka have inscriptions on their back recording that they were the personal meditation image (thugs dam) of a notable monk. Most artists were probably monks, although lay artists seem to have also existed, as they did for metalwork sculpture. The commissioner would provide the materials, which were often valuable, and by tradition the compensation to the artist was regarded as a "gift" rather than a fee. The word "thangka" means "thing that one unrolls" in Classical Tibetan. Thangka are very rarely signed, but some artists are known, more because they were important monastic leaders than famous as artists. Painting was a valued accomplishment in a monk.

The earliest surviving Tibetan paintings on cloth are from the Mogao Caves at Dunhuang on the Silk Road in Gansu province, China. The "Library Cave" there was a repository of old or worn out manuscripts, paintings, prints, textiles and other items which was sealed off in the 11th century, after several centuries of deposits. Many of the paintings have Tibetan inscriptions or are in a style that can be recognized as Tibetan, as opposed to the dominant Han Chinese style and some pieces reflecting Indian styles. Though they are hard to date, it is thought that these pieces mainly come from a period c. 781–848 during Tang dynasty rule.

Surviving tangkas on cloth certainly from Tibet itself start in the 11th century, after the revival of Buddhism; there are some 20 surviving from the 11th and 12th century. Such early examples typically have compositions that are already complex, but less so than in later examples. Later the typical compositions show a central figure flanked by smaller figures, often in framed compartments, or surrounded by flaming halos or seated on small clouds. Behind these figures a landscape background including much sky is often indicated, though little of it may be visible. The central figure may be a deity, arhat, or important monk, and the same groups make up the background figures. Several of the figures may be different "aspects" or reincarnations of each other according to Buddhist theology. In the example at left the flanking bodhisattvas are in a style, one of several found in such figures in this period, that appears derived from central Indian art.

Over the following centuries Tibetan painting, both on walls and thangka, continued to develop in its distinctive style, balancing between the two major influences of Indo-Nepalese and Han Chinese painting, despite Buddhism being on the general decline in these regions. Styles could vary considerably between the different regions of Tibet, as well as the wider region where tangkas were painted. Within Tibet the regions nearer Nepal and the rest of China were often more influenced by regional styles. Bhutanese tangkas were mainly influenced by Central Tibet. The different monastic orders also developed somewhat different stylistic characters.

Tibetan painting incorporated many elements from Han Chinese painting, especially from the 14th century onwards, reaching a peak in the 18th century. One aspect of this was allowing more space and emphasis to the landscape background. In general the style of figures in thangkas remains derived from the Indo-Nepalese tradition. According to Giuseppe Tucci, by the time of the Qing dynasty, "a new Tibetan art was then developed, which in a certain sense was a provincial echo of the Chinese 18th century's smooth ornate preciosity." Since the Yuan dynasty, Tibet was administered as part of China, but when the Qing dynasty came to power court interest in Tibetan Buddhism increased, and many refined and elegant works were produced by Imperial artists and sent to Tibet, influencing local styles. As well as the court style, there was influence from the regions of China near Tibet.

Tangkas were painted in all the areas where Tibetan Buddhism flourished, which apart from those mentioned already included Mongolia, Ladakh, Sikkim, and parts of Himalayan India in Arunachal Pradesh, Dharamshala, and Lahaul and Spiti district in Himachal Pradesh. It is also practiced in parts of Russia (Kalmykia, Buryatia, and Tuva) and Northeast China.

Other traditions of Buddhist scroll paintings are not usually covered by the term thangka, although they may have many similarities, and descend from the same origins. An example is Japanese painting, where a number of very early examples survive from the Nara (710–794) and Heian periods (794–185). Most of these are National Treasures of Japan. Raigō-zu developed as one popular genre, showing the Amida Buddha accompanied by bodhisattvas welcoming the souls of the faithful to his Western Paradise. These were, and still are, carried into the house of a person who was near death.

== Types ==
Based on technique and material, tangkas can be grouped by types. Generally, they are divided into two broad categories: those that are painted (Tib.) bris-tan—and those made of silk, either by appliqué or embroidery.

Tangkas are further divided into these more specific categories:

- Painted in colours (Tib.) tson-tang—the most common type
- Appliqué (Tib.) go-tang
- Black Background—meaning gold line on a black background (Tib.) nagtang
- Blockprints—paper or cloth outlined renderings, by woodcut/woodblock printing
- Embroidery (Tib.) tsem-thang
- Gold Background—an auspicious treatment, used judiciously for peaceful, long-life deities and fully enlightened buddhas
- Red Background—literally gold line, but referring to gold line on a vermillion (Tib.) mar-tang

Whereas typical tangkas are fairly small, with painted area between about 20 to 50 centimetres (8 to 20 in) high, there are also giant festival tangkas, usually appliqué, and designed to be unrolled against a wall in a monastery for particular religious occasions. These are likely to be wider than they are tall, and may be sixty or more feet across and perhaps twenty or more high. In Bhutan at least these are called thongdrels. There are also larger than average thankas that were designed for altars or display in temples.

Somewhat related are Tibetan tsakli, cards which look like miniature tangkas perhaps up to 15 centimetres (6 in) high, and often square, usually containing a single figure. These were mostly produced in sets and were usually used in earlier stages of training monks, or as initiation cards or offerings, or to use when constructing temporary mandalas. Another related form is the painted wooden top cover for a manuscript book, giving a long narrow strip, typically some 6 by 55 cm (2.4 by 22 in), often painted with a row of seated figures in compartments. The techniques for both these forms are essentially the same as for thangka, and presumably the same artists worked on them. Because tangkas can be quite expensive, people nowadays use posters of tangkas as an alternative to the real tangkas for religious purposes.

Sources on Asian art often describe all-textile tangkas as "tapestry", but tangkas that meet the normal definition of tapestry with the image created only by weaving a single piece of fabric with different colours of thread are extremely rare, though a few tapestry examples in the Chinese kesi technique are known, mostly from the medieval period. There is a large example in the Hermitage Museum, although in this and other pieces the different colours are woven separately and then sewn together in a type of patchwork. Most thangka described as tapestry are some combination of embroidery, appliqué and other techniques.

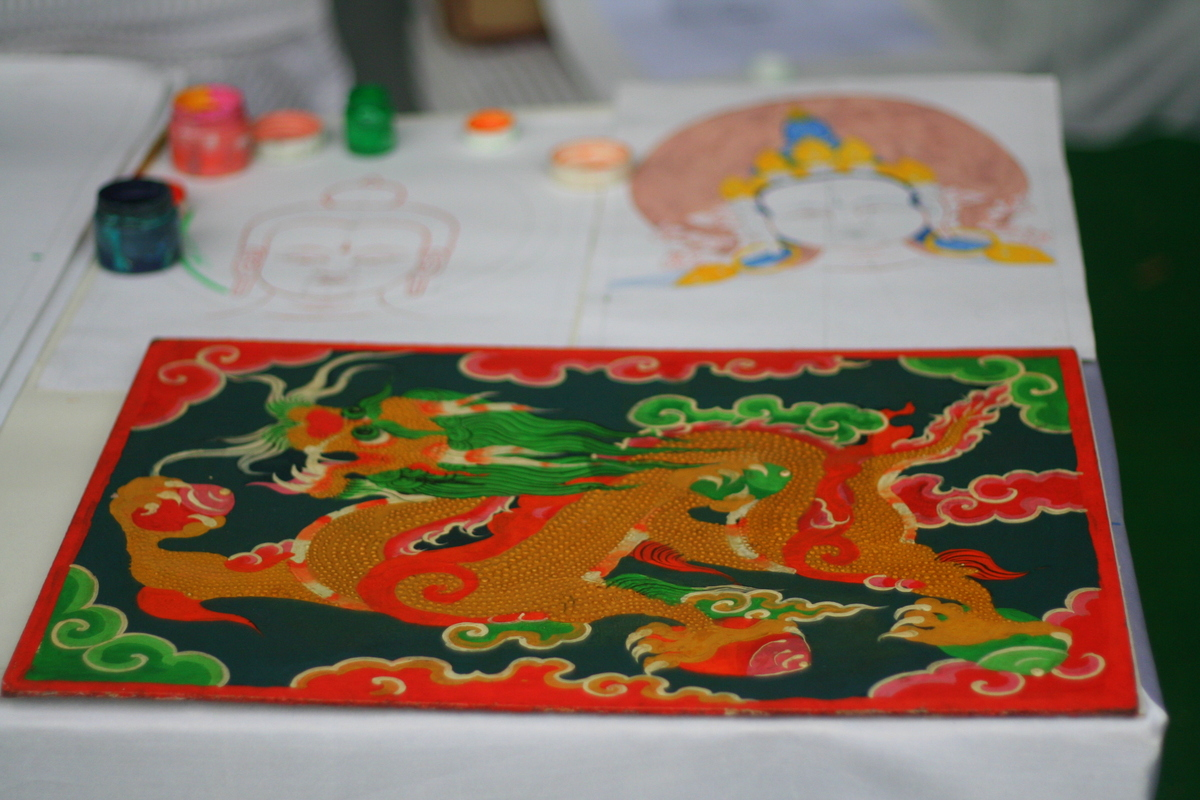
Thanka in making

== Process ==
Thangkas are painted on cotton or silk. The most common is a loosely woven cotton produced in widths from 40 to 58 cm (16 to 23 in). While some variations do exist, tangkas wider than 45 cm (17 or 18 inches) frequently have seams in the support. The paint consists of pigments in a water-soluble medium of animal glue. Both mineral and organic pigments are used. In Western terminology, this is a distemper technique; although it is often described as a form of gouache, this is incorrect, and the paint was applied as a warm liquid, mixed shortly before application. In Nepal, 24 carat gold is also plated over some parts of thangka paintings which makes the art a little more expensive.

Most old thangka have inscriptions on the back, usually the mantra of the deity depicted, but sometimes also information as to later owners, though rarely information about the original commissioner or artist. Sometimes x-rays allow pious inscriptions placed under the paint on the front of the image to be seen. Inscriptions may be made in the shape of a stupa, or sometimes other shapes.

The composition of a thangka, as with the majority of Buddhist art, is highly geometric. Arms, legs, eyes, nostrils, ears, and various ritual implements are all laid out on a systematic grid of angles and intersecting lines. A skilled thangka artist will generally select from a variety of predesigned items to include in the composition, ranging from alms bowls and animals, to the shape, size, and angle of a figure's eyes, nose, and lips. The process seems very methodical, but often requires deep understanding of the symbolism involved to capture the spirit of it.

Thangka often overflow with symbolism and allusion. Because the art is explicitly religious, all symbols and allusions must be in accordance with strict guidelines laid out in Buddhist scripture. The artist must be properly trained and have sufficient religious understanding, knowledge, and background to create an accurate and appropriate thangka:

Tibetan art exemplifies the nirmanakaya, the physical body of Buddha, and also the qualities of the Buddha, perhaps in the form of a deity. Art objects, therefore, must follow rules specified in the Buddhist scriptures regarding proportions, shape, color, stance, hand positions, and attributes in order to personify correctly the Buddha or Deities.

== Nepal ==
The earliest surviving thangka paintings from Nepal date to about the 14th century AD, but this is probably well after Buddhists and Hindus began to make illustrations of the deities and natural scenes. Historically, Tibetan and Chinese influence in Nepalese paintings is quite evident in Paubhas (Tangkas), and Nepalese styles have been a significant influence on Tibetan art. Paubhas are of two types, the Palas which are illustrative paintings of the deities and the Mandala, which are mystic diagrams paintings of complex test prescribed patterns of circles and square each having specific significance. It was through Nepal that Mahayana Buddhism was introduced into Tibet during reign of Angshuvarma in the seventh century AD. There was therefore a great demand for religious icons and Buddhist manuscripts for newly built monasteries throughout Tibet. A number of Buddhist manuscripts, including Prajnaparamita, were copied in Kathmandu Valley for these monasteries. Astasahas rika Prajnaparamita for example, was copied in Patan in the year 999 AD, during the reign of Narendra Dev and Udaya Deva, for the Sa-Shakya monastery in Tibet. For the Nor monastery in Tibet, two copies were made in Nepal, one of Astasahasrika Prajnaparamita in 1069 AD and the other of Kavyadarsha in 1111 AD. The influence of Nepalese art extended to China in regular order in the thirteenth century. Nepalese artisans were dispatched to the courts of Chinese emperors at their request to perform their workmanship and impart expert knowledge, with the Nepalese innovator and architect Balbahu, known by his popular name Araniko becoming the chief Imperial artist of Kubilai Khan.

After the introduction of paper, palm leaf became less popular, however, it continued to be used until the eighteenth century. Paper manuscripts imitated the oblong shape but were wider than the palm leaves. From the fifteenth century onwards, brighter colours gradually began to appear in Nepalese thangka. Because of the growing importance of the tantric cult, various aspects of Shiva and Shakti were painted in conventional poses. Mahakala, Manjushri, Lokeshvara and other deities were equally popular and so were also frequently represented in thangka paintings of later dates. As Tantrism embodies the ideas of esoteric power, magic forces, and a great variety of symbols, strong emphasis is laid on the female element and sexuality in the paintings of that period.

Religious paintings worshipped as icons are known as Paubha in Newari and thangka in Tibetan. The origin of Paubha or thangka paintings may be attributed to the Nepalese artists responsible for creating a number of special metal works and wall- paintings as well as illuminated manuscripts in Tibet. Realizing the great demand for religious icons in Tibet, these artists, along with monks and traders, took with them from Nepal not only metal sculptures but also a number of Buddhist manuscripts. One of the earliest specimens of Nepalese Thangka painting dates from the thirteenth /fourteenth century and shows Amitabha surrounded by bodhisattva. Another Nepalese thangka with three dates in the inscription (the last one corresponding to 1369 AD), is one of the earliest known thangka with inscriptions. The "Mandala of Vishnu " dated 1420 AD, is another fine example of the painting of this period. Early Nepalese Tangkas are simple in design and composition. The main deity, a large figure, occupies the central position while surrounded by smaller figures of lesser divinities.

During the reign of Tibetan Dharma King Trisong Duetsen the Tibetan masters refined their already well-developed arts through research and studies of different country's tradition. Thanka painting's lining and measurement, costumes, implementations and ornaments are mostly based on Indian styles. The drawing of figures is based on Nepalese style and the background sceneries are based on Chinese style. Thus, the thangka paintings became a unique and distinctive art. Although the practice of thanka painting was originally done as a way of gaining merit it has nowadays evolved into a commercial business and the noble intentions it once carried has been diluted. Tibetans do not sell Tangkas on a large scale as the selling of religious artifacts such as tangkas and idols is frowned upon in the Tibetan community and thus non Tibetan groups have been able to monopolize on its (thangka's) popularity among Buddhist and art enthusiasts from the west.

Thangka have developed in the northern Himalayan regions among the Lamas. Besides Lamas, Gurung and Tamang communities are also producing Tankas, which provide substantial employment opportunities for many people in the hills. Newari Thankas or paubha have been produced in Kathmandu valley from the 13th century.

== Gallery ==
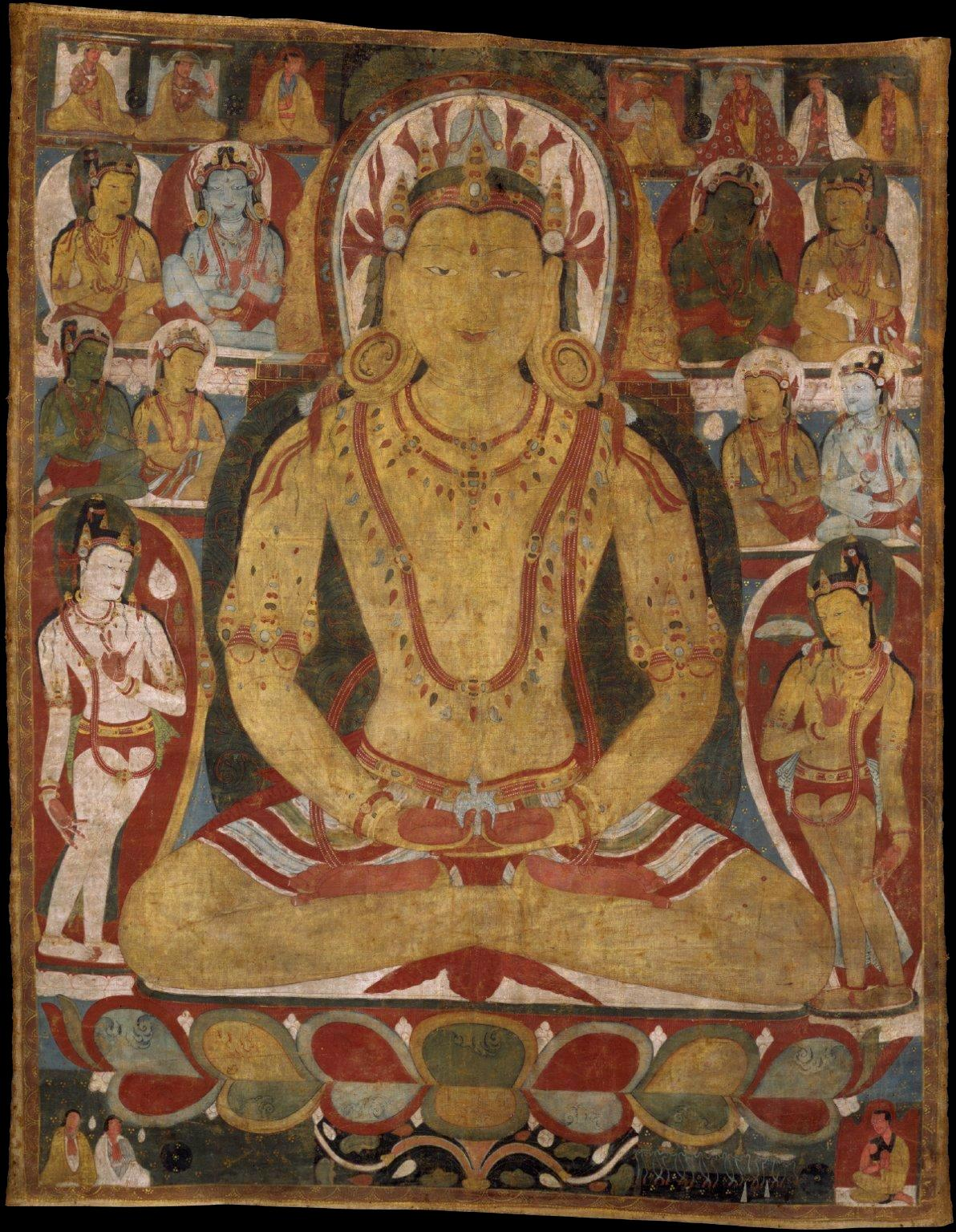
11th or early 12th-century thangka of the Amitābha Buddha, with donor portraits at bottom

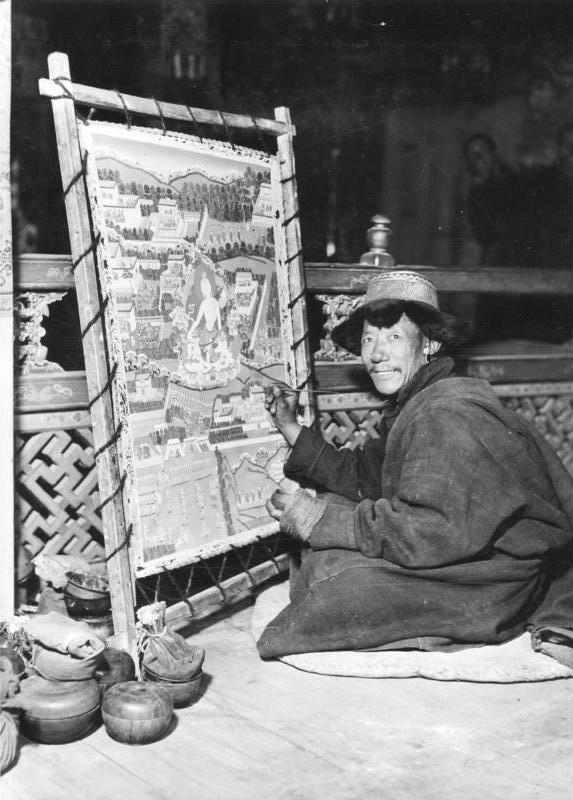
Monk painting a thangka at the Potala in Lhasa in 1938

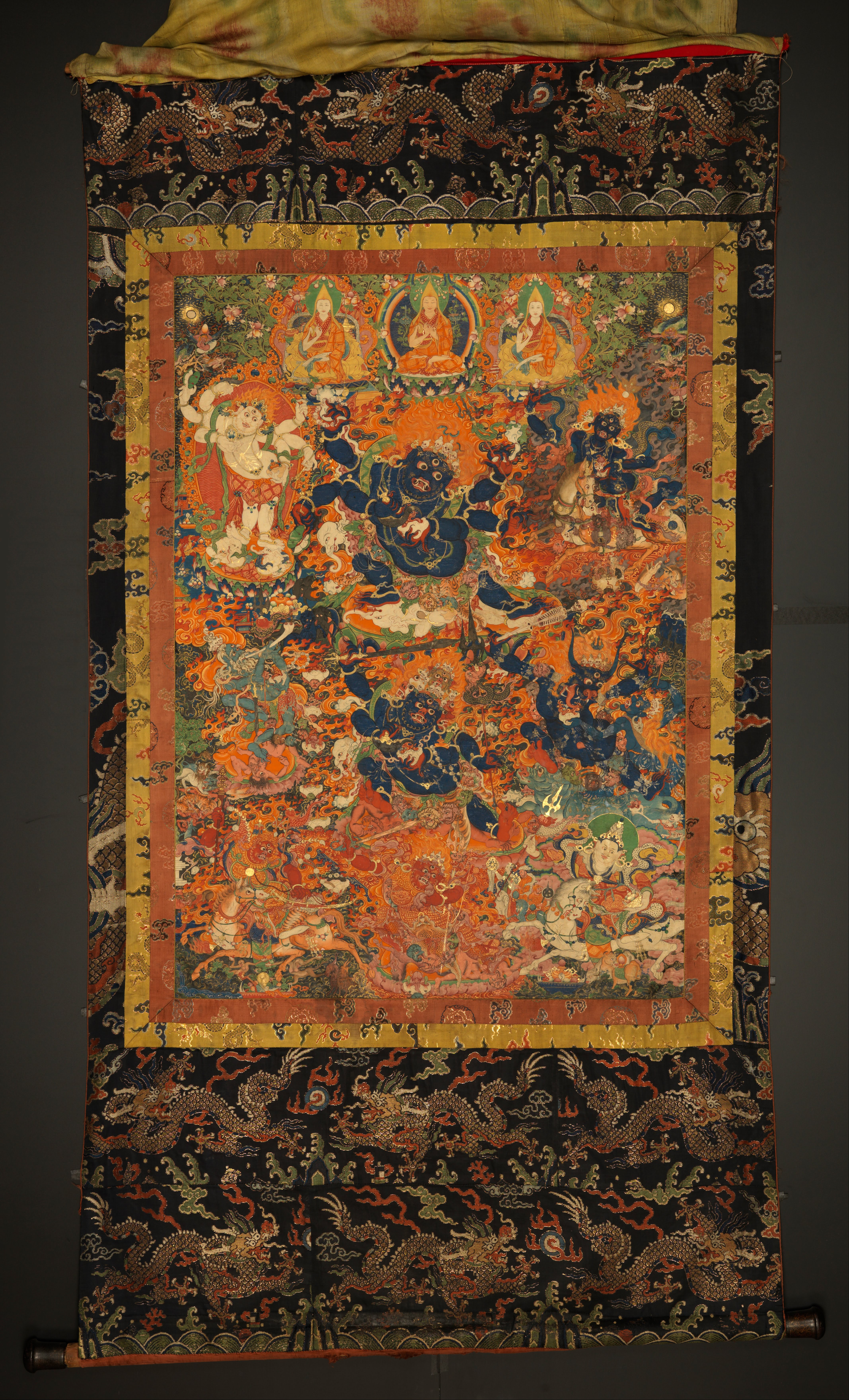
Thanka with its backing and (above) cover

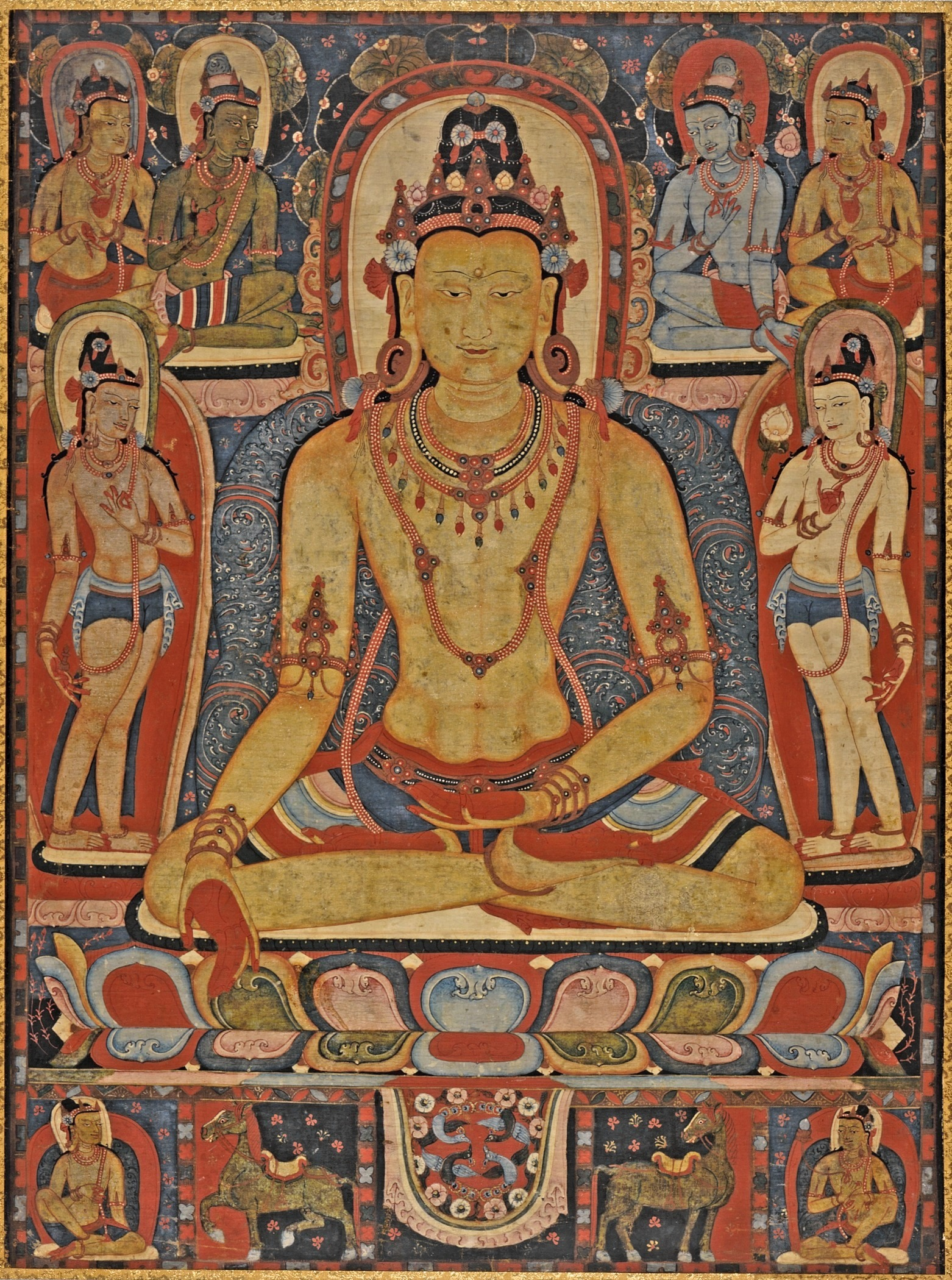
Jina Buddha Ratnasambhava, Central Tibet, Kadampa Monastery, 1150–1225

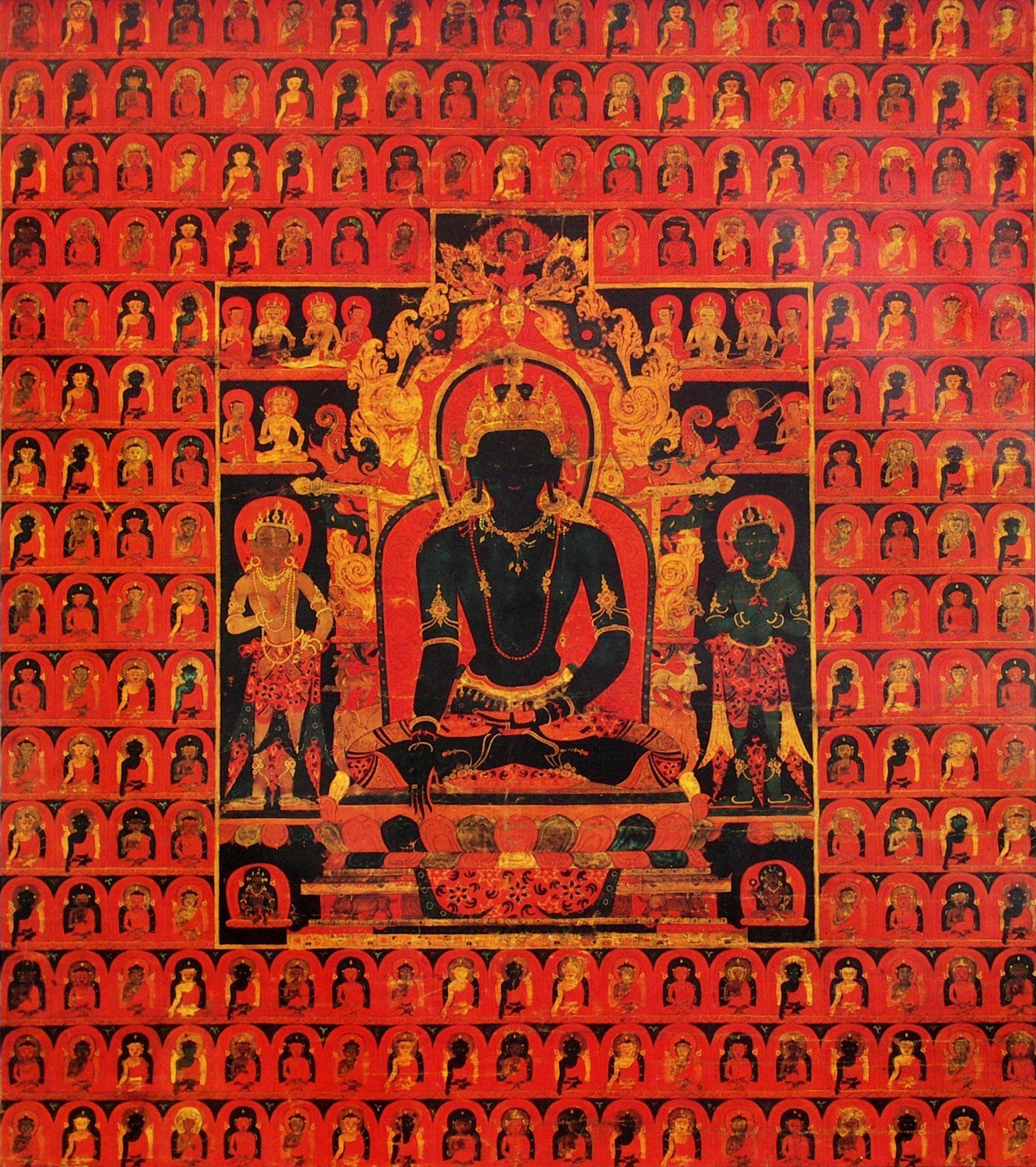
'The Dhyani Buddha Akshobhya', Tibetan thangka, late 13th century, Honolulu Museum of Art. The background consists of multiple images of the Five Dhyani Buddhas.

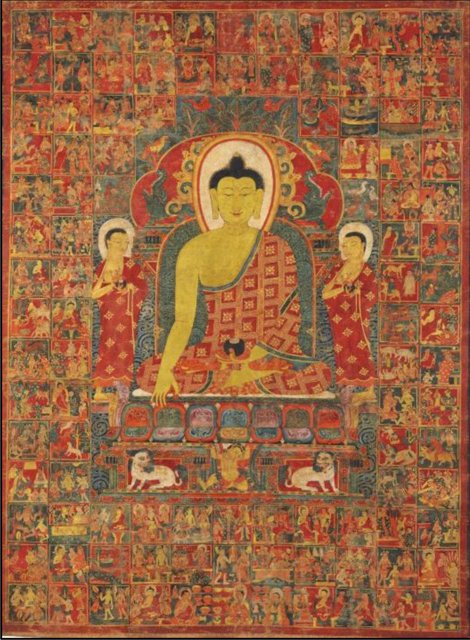
Thangka of Buddha with the One Hundred Jataka Tales, Tibet, 13th–14th century

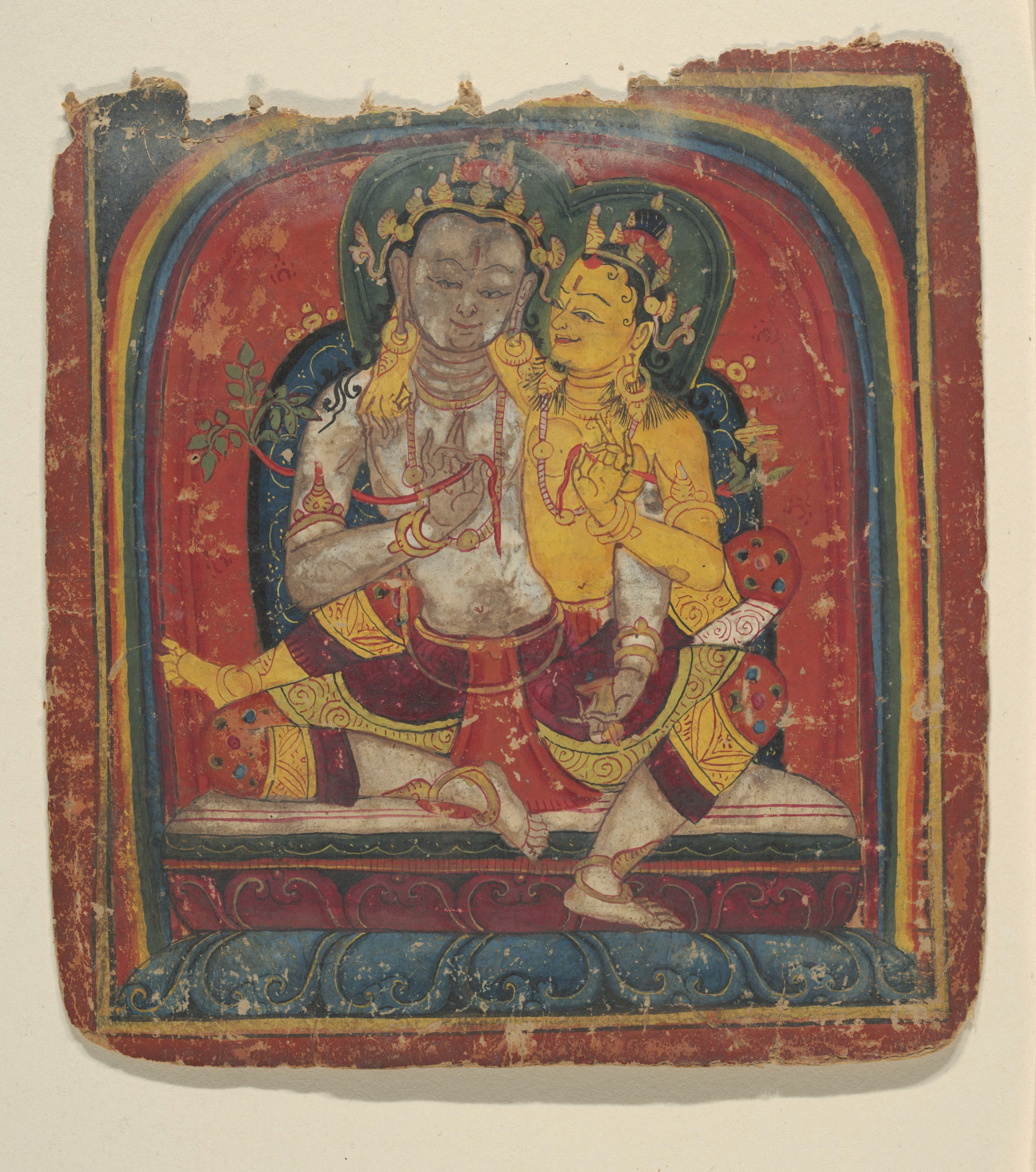
Small tsakli, 13–14th century

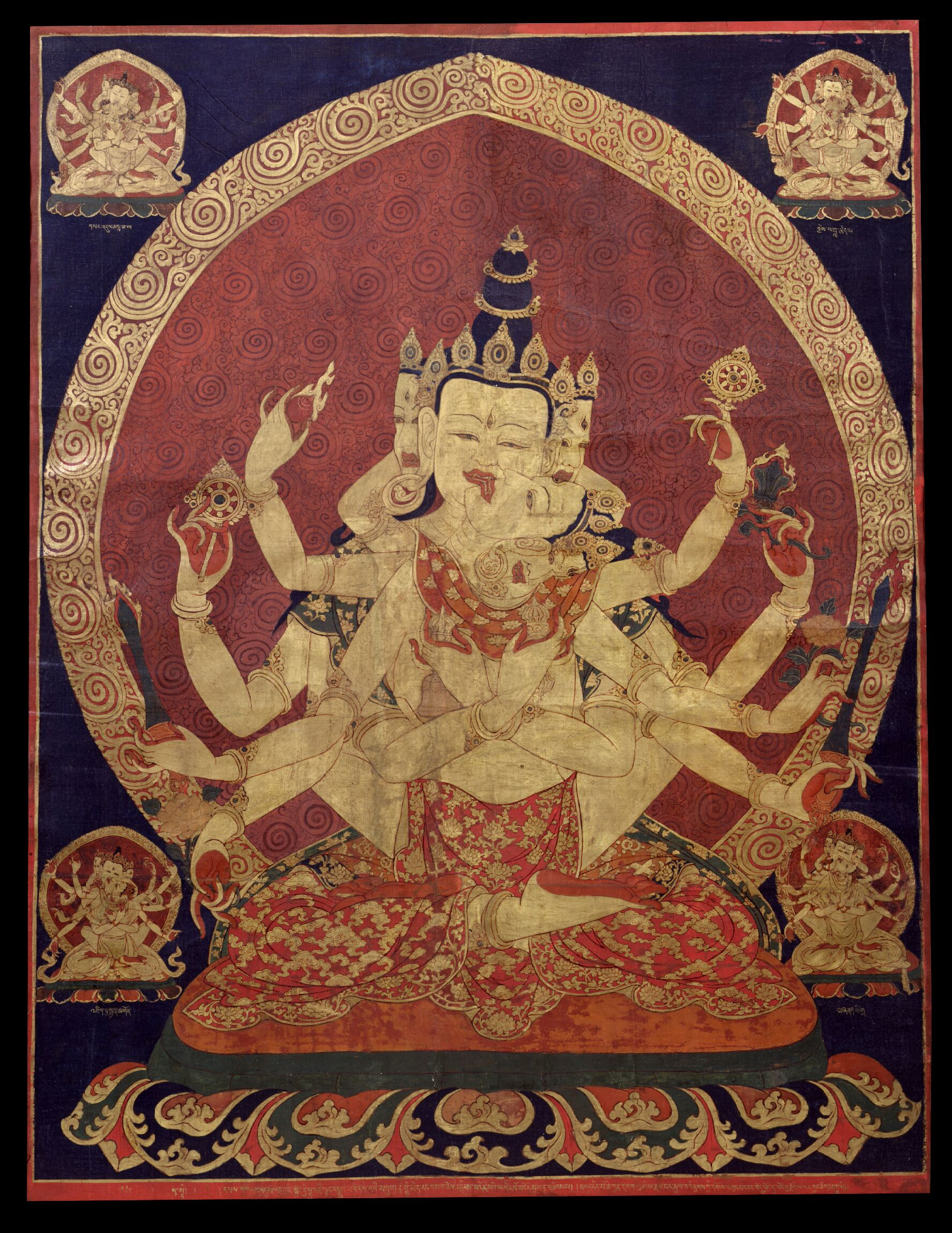
17th-century Central Tibetan thanka of Guhyasamaja Akshobhyavajra, Rubin Museum of Art

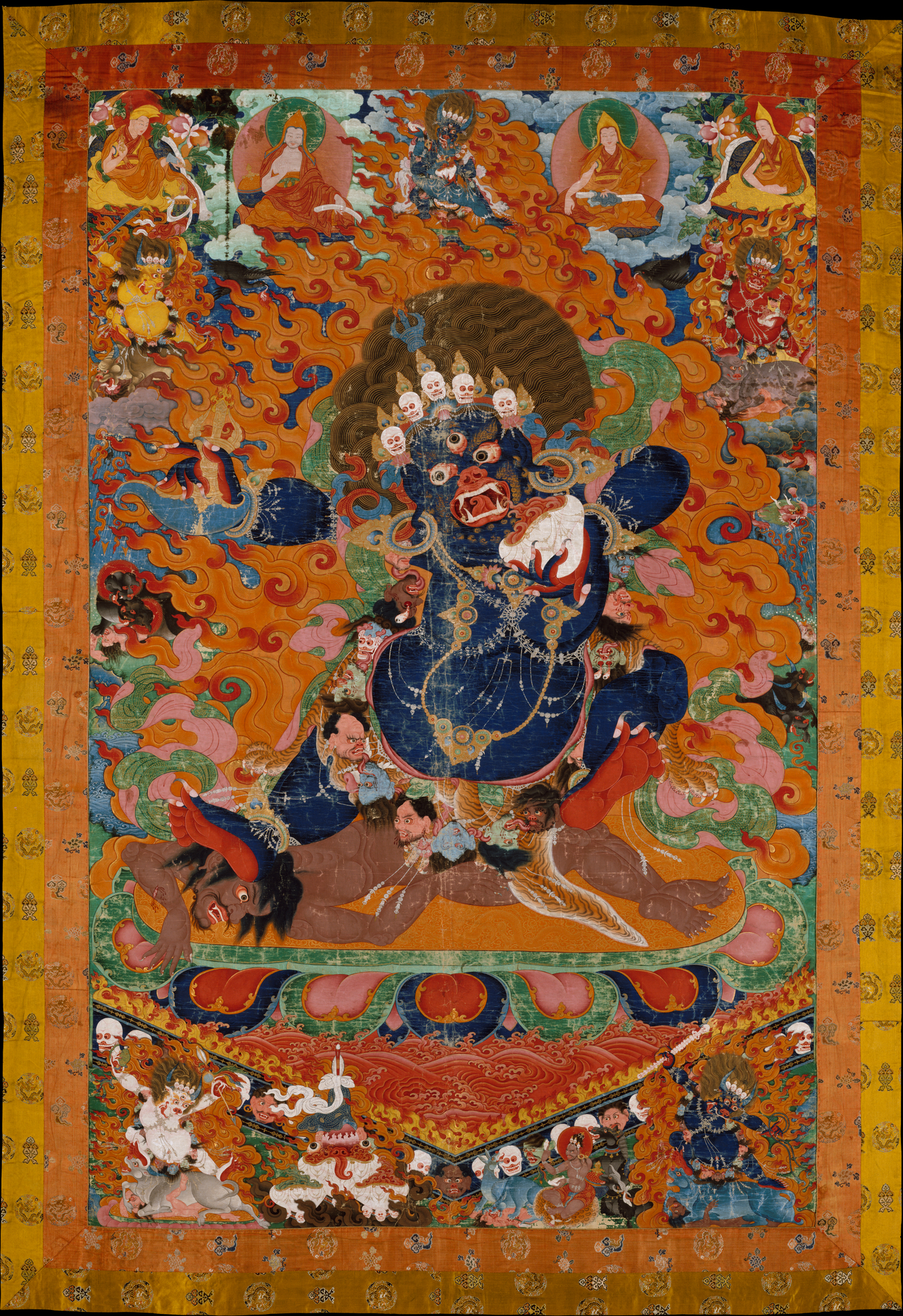
Yama, Tibet, 17th- or early 18th-century. Over six feet high, this was originally one of a set of protective deities.

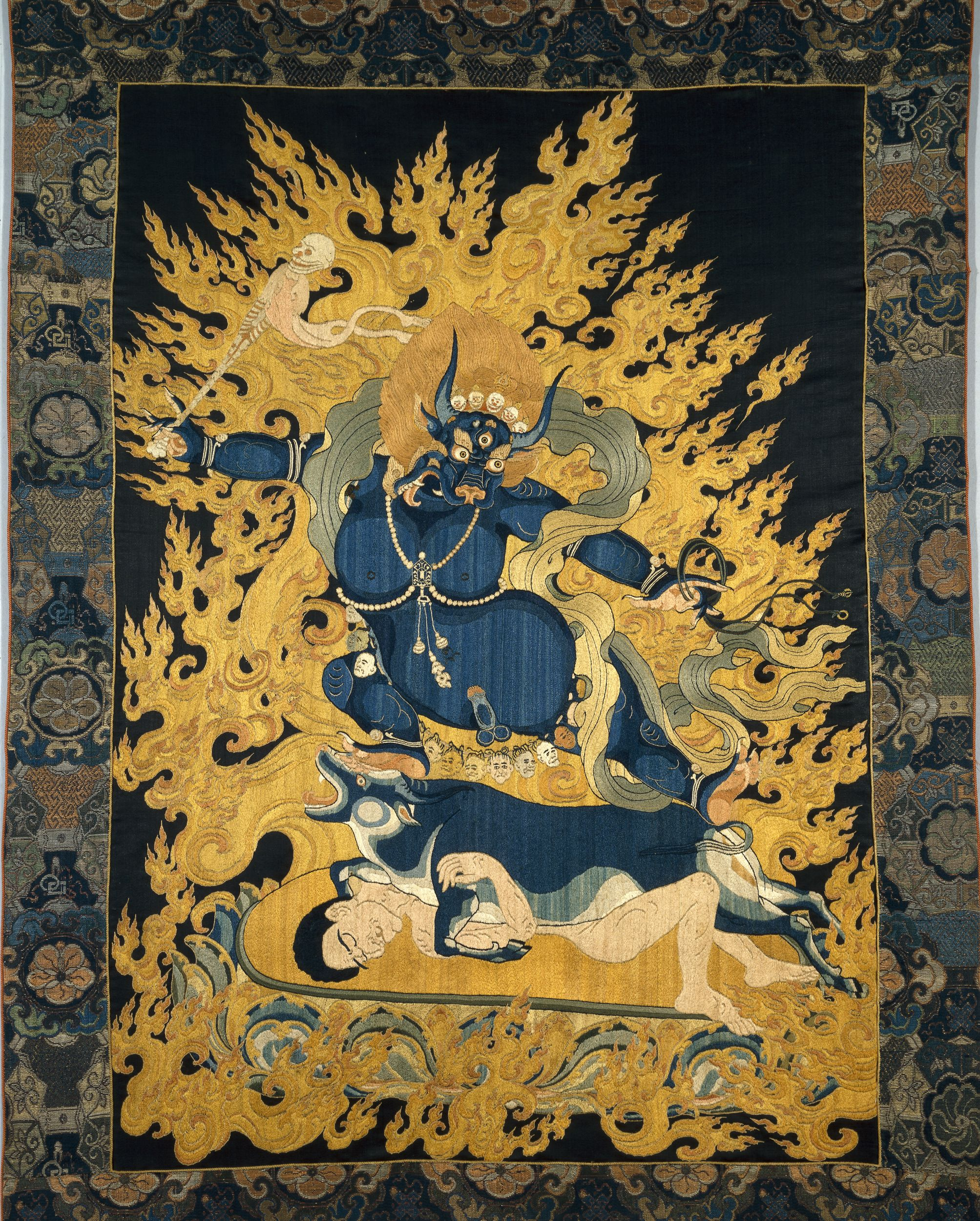
Yama Dharmapala, Tibeto-Chinese, silk embroidery, 18th century

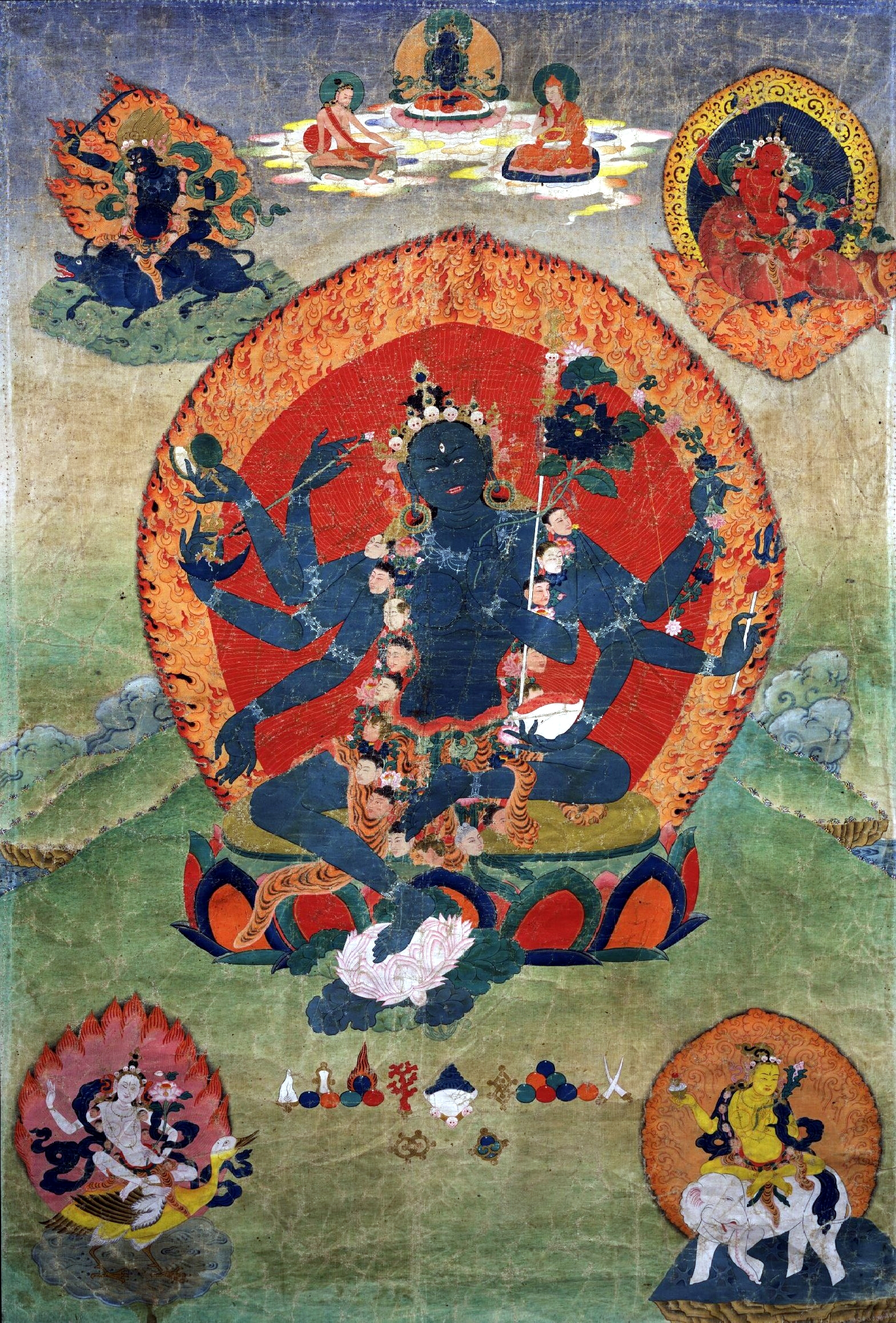
18th-century Eastern Tibetan thanka, with the Green Tara (Samaya Tara Yogini) in the center and the Blue, Red, White and Yellow taras in the corners, Rubin Museum of Art

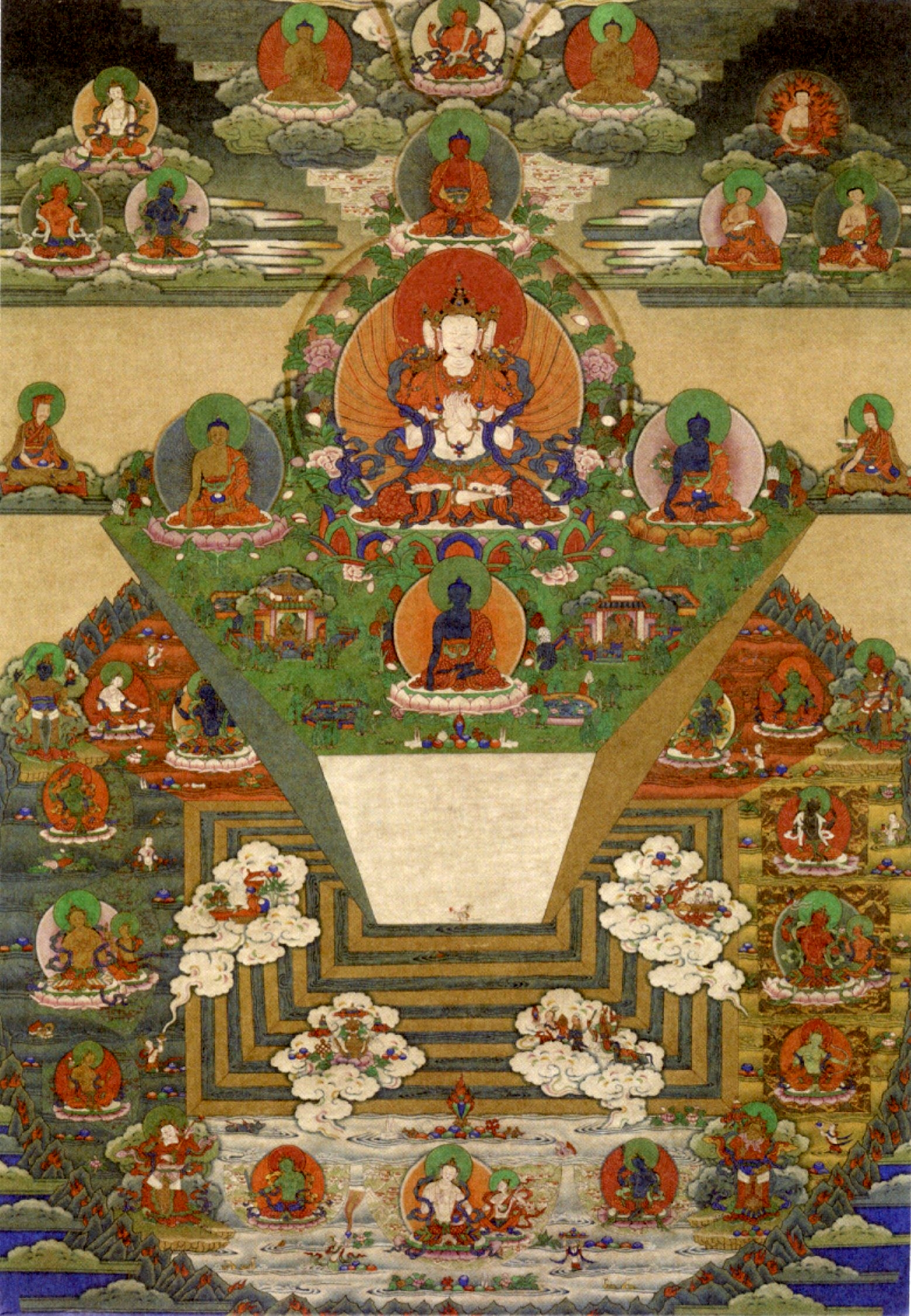
Bhutanese thangka of Mt. Meru and the Buddhist Universe, 19th century, Trongsa Dzong, Trongsa, Bhutan

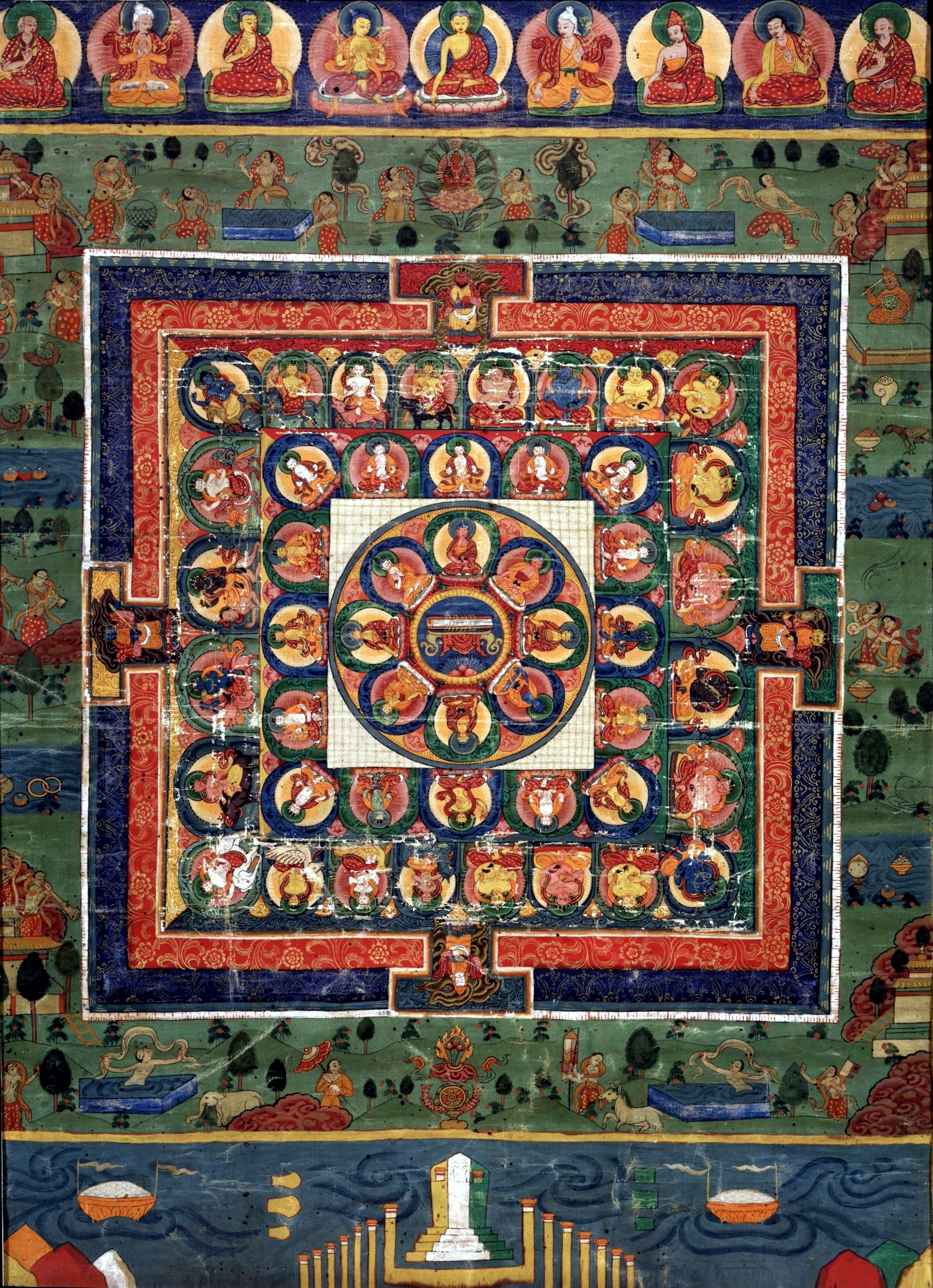
Painted Bhutanese Medicine Buddha mandala with the goddess Prajnaparamita in center, 19th century, Rubin Museum of Art

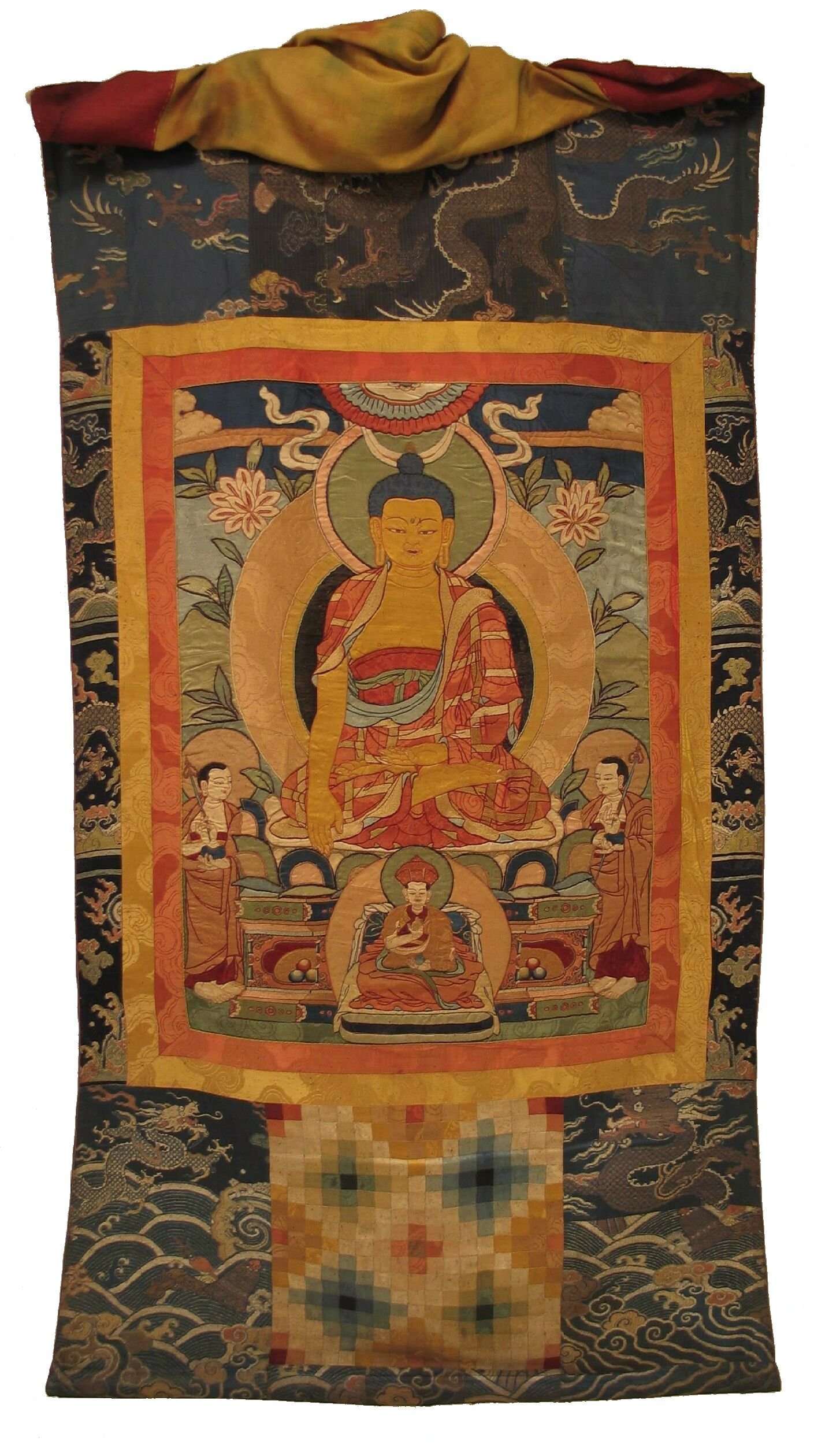
Bhutanese Drukpa Kagyu applique Buddhist lineage thangka with Shakyamuni Buddha in center, 19th century, Rubin Museum of Art

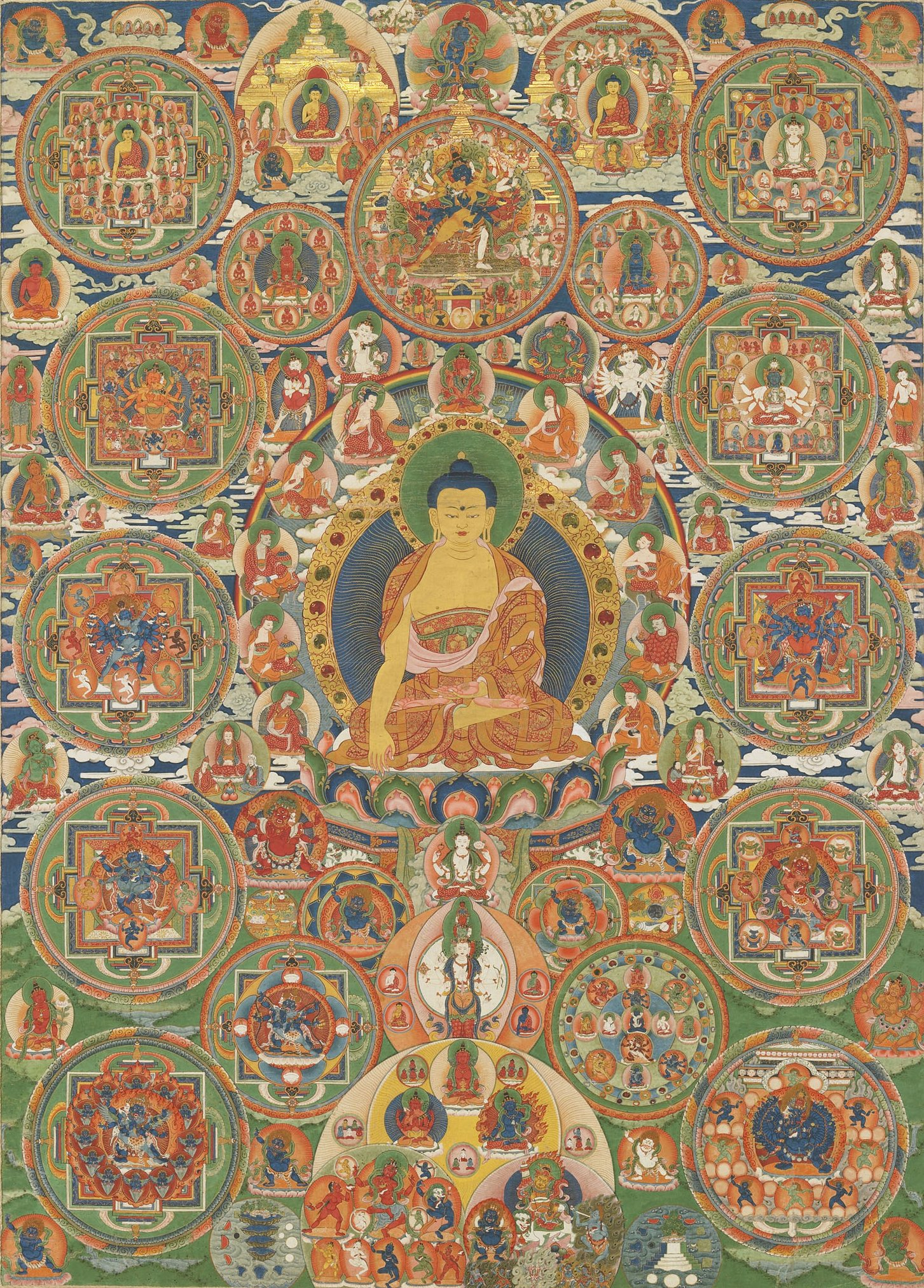
Bhutanese painted complete mandala, 19th century, Seula Gonpa, Punakha, Bhutan

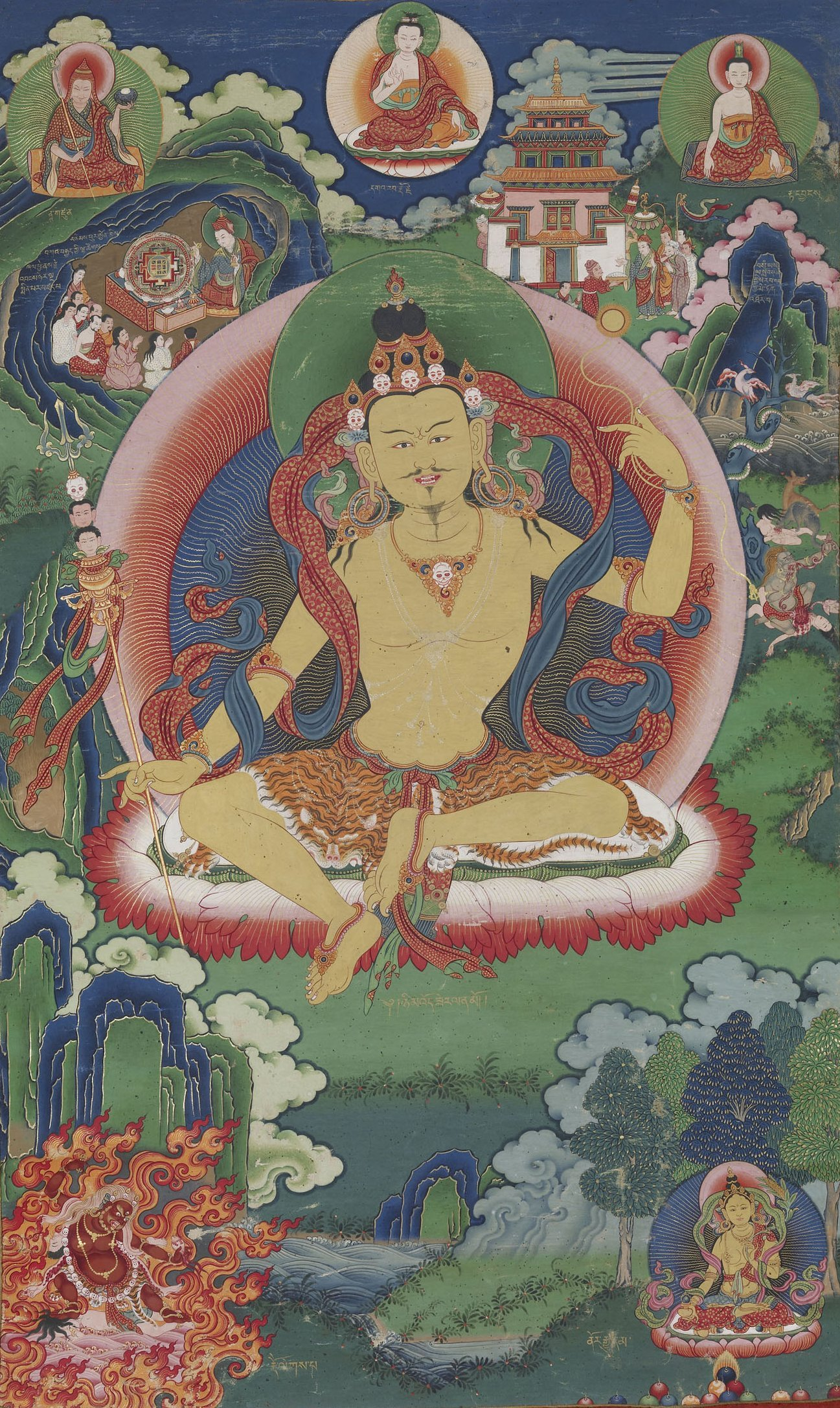
Bhutanese painted thangka of Guru Nyima Ozer, late 19th century, Do Khachu Gonpa, Chukha, Bhutan

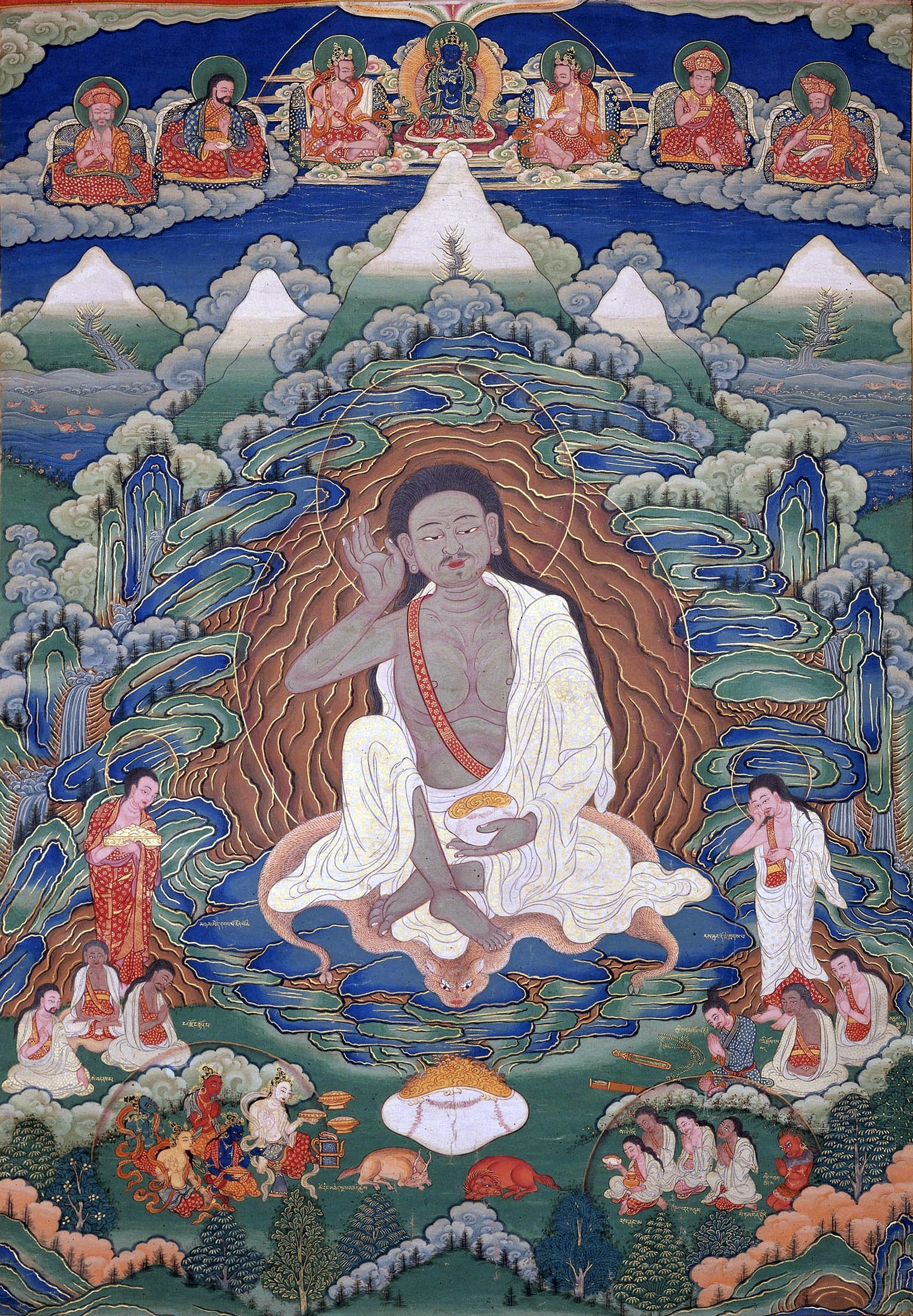
Bhutanese painted thangka of Milarepa (1052–1135), late 19th–early 20th century, Dhodeydrag Gonpa, Thimphu, Bhutan

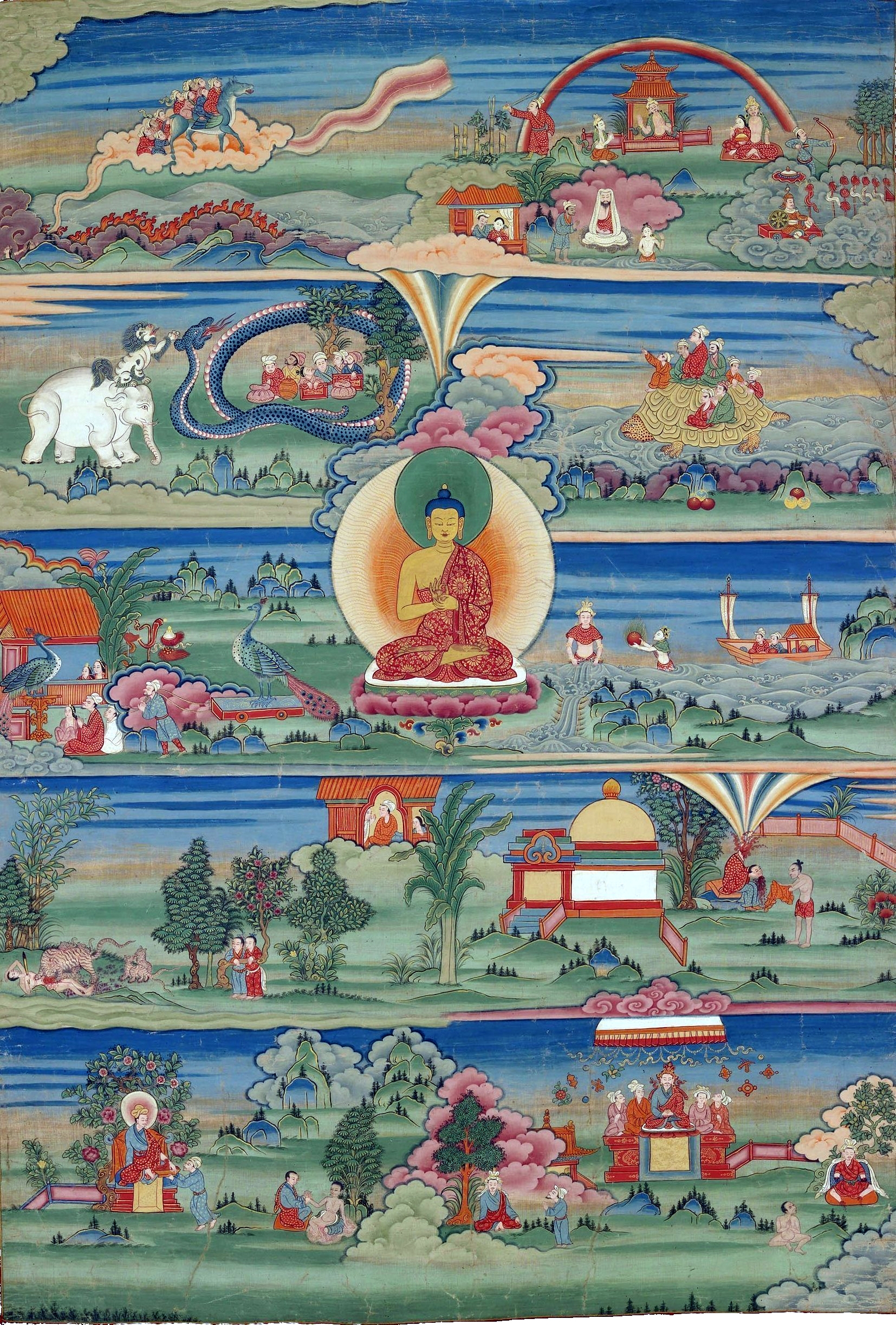
Bhutanese painted thangka of the Jataka Tales, 18th–19th century, Phajoding Gonpa, Thimphu, Bhutan

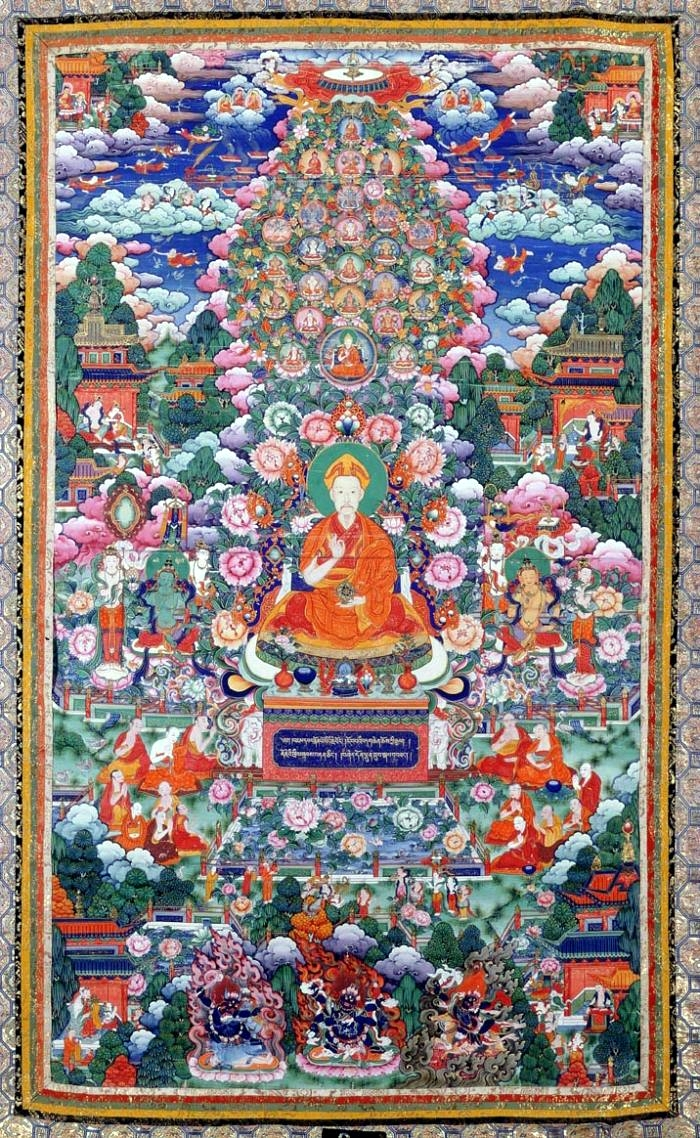
The Qianlong Emperor of China dressed as a monk

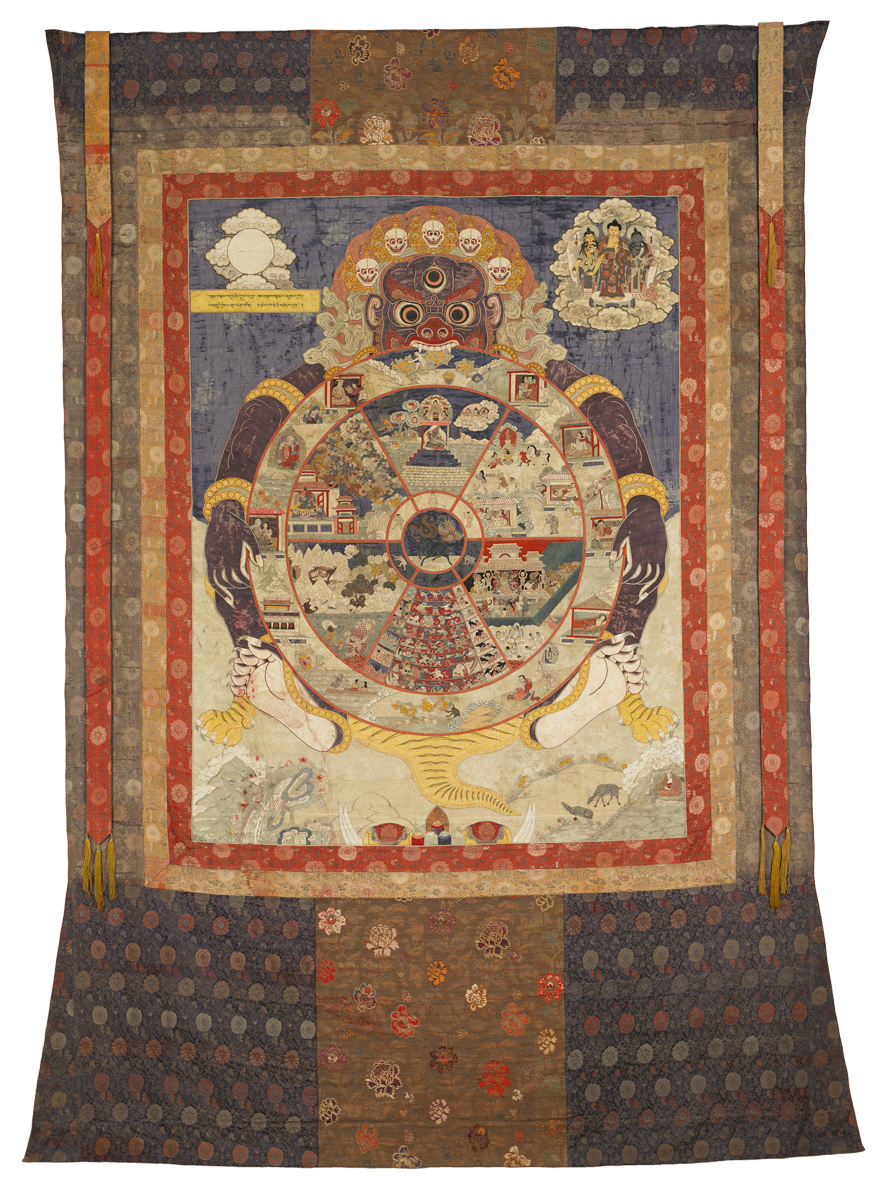
Wheel of Life, from about 1800, Birmingham Museum of Art

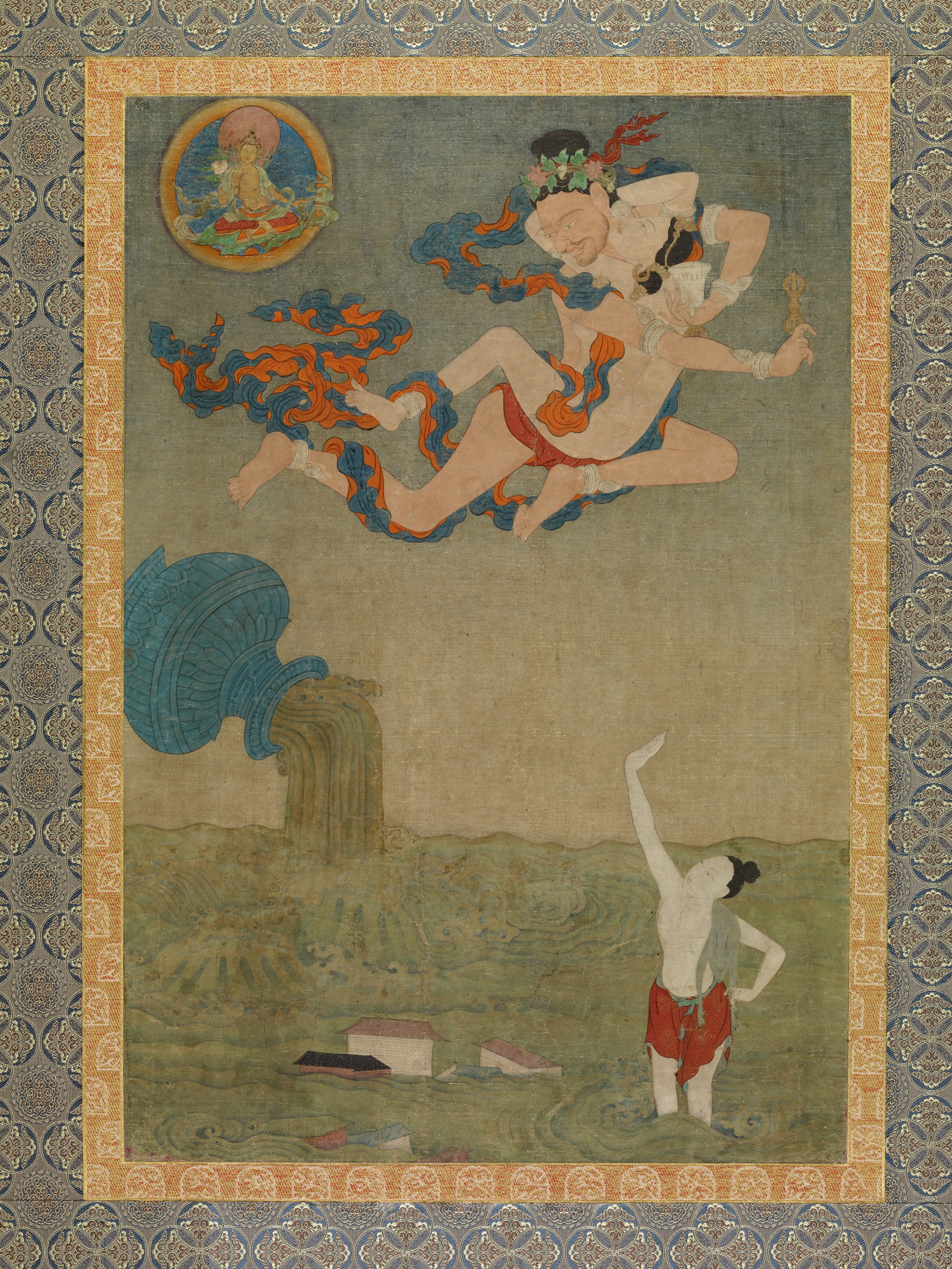
The mahasiddha Ghantapa (below), from Situ Panchen's set of thangka depicting the Eight Great Tantric Adepts. 18th century, with Chinese influence

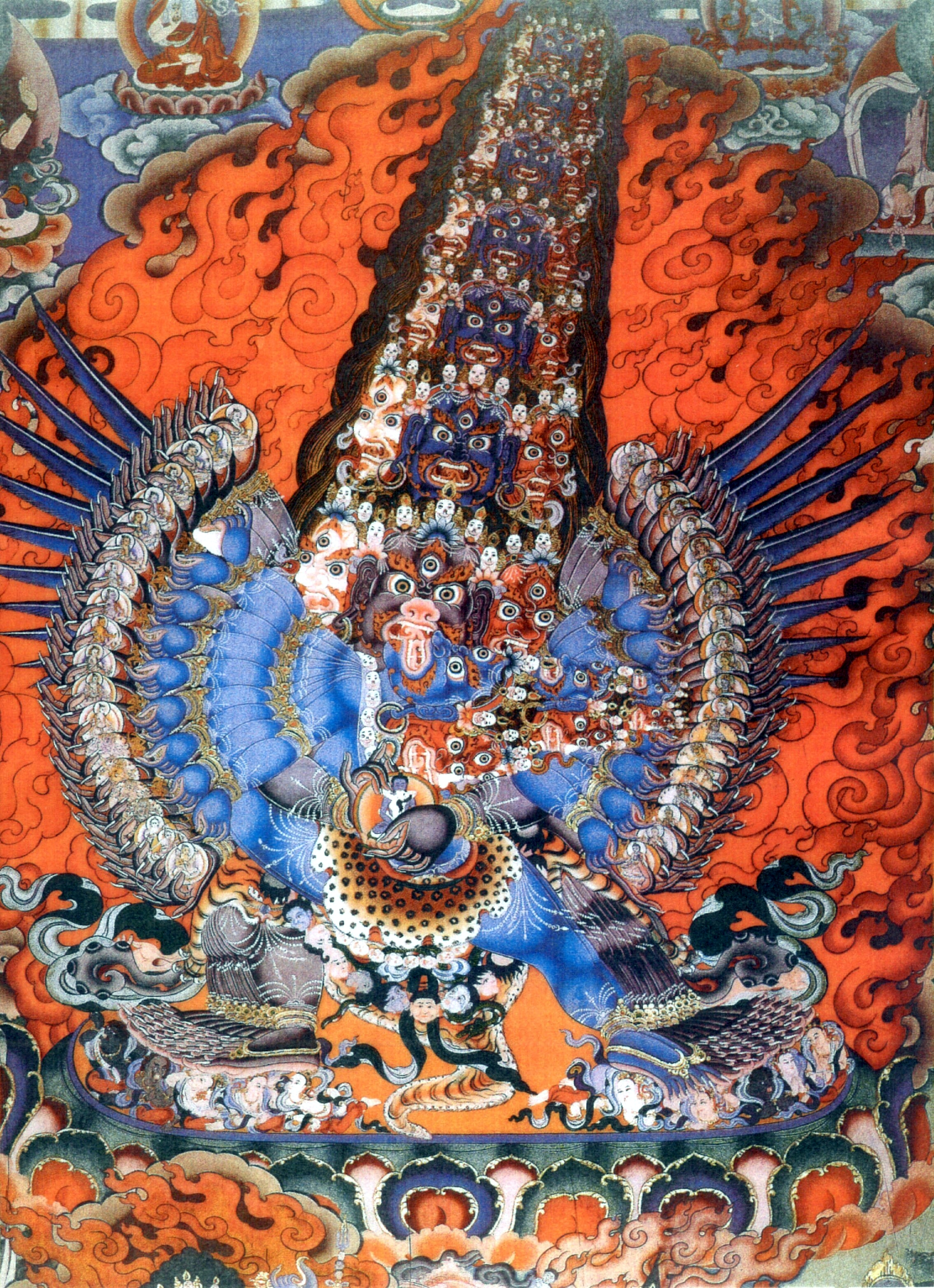
Tibetan thangka of the Chemchok Heruka

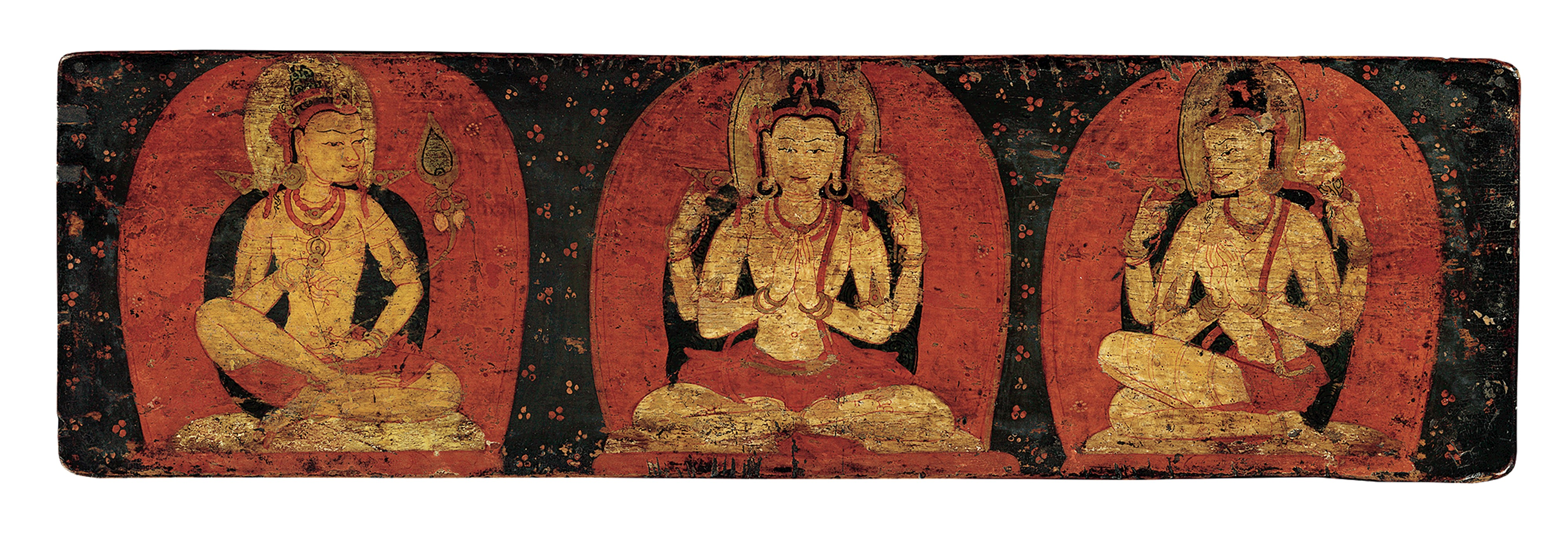
One of a pair of book covers, c. 12th century

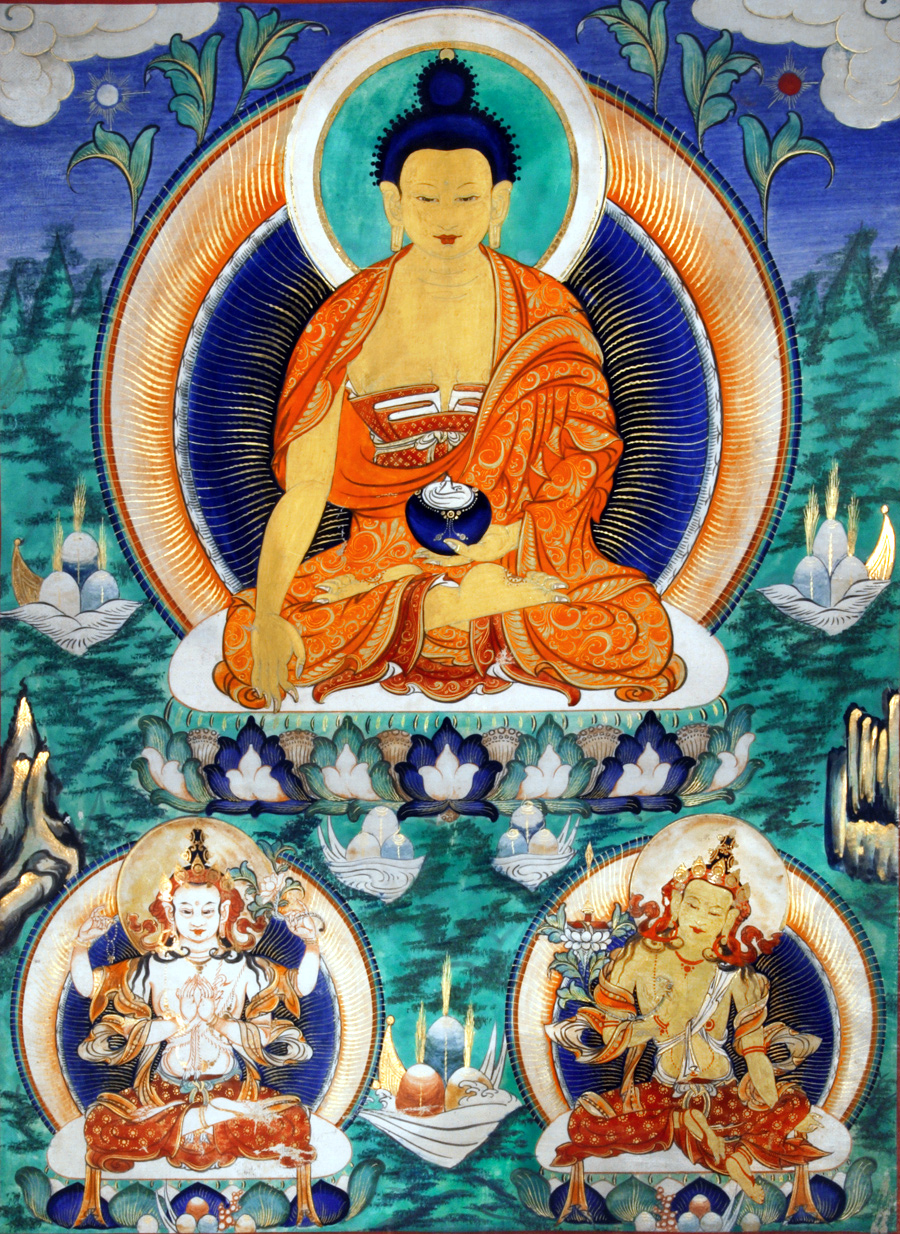
19th-century Mongolian distemper painting with highlights of gold, depicting Shakyamuni flanked by Avalokiteśvara and Manjushri. The form of Manjushri depicted here is not wielding the characteristic flaming sword, but there are many forms of the eight great bodhisattvas, some are based on the Indian tradition, and other from visions of historical masters.

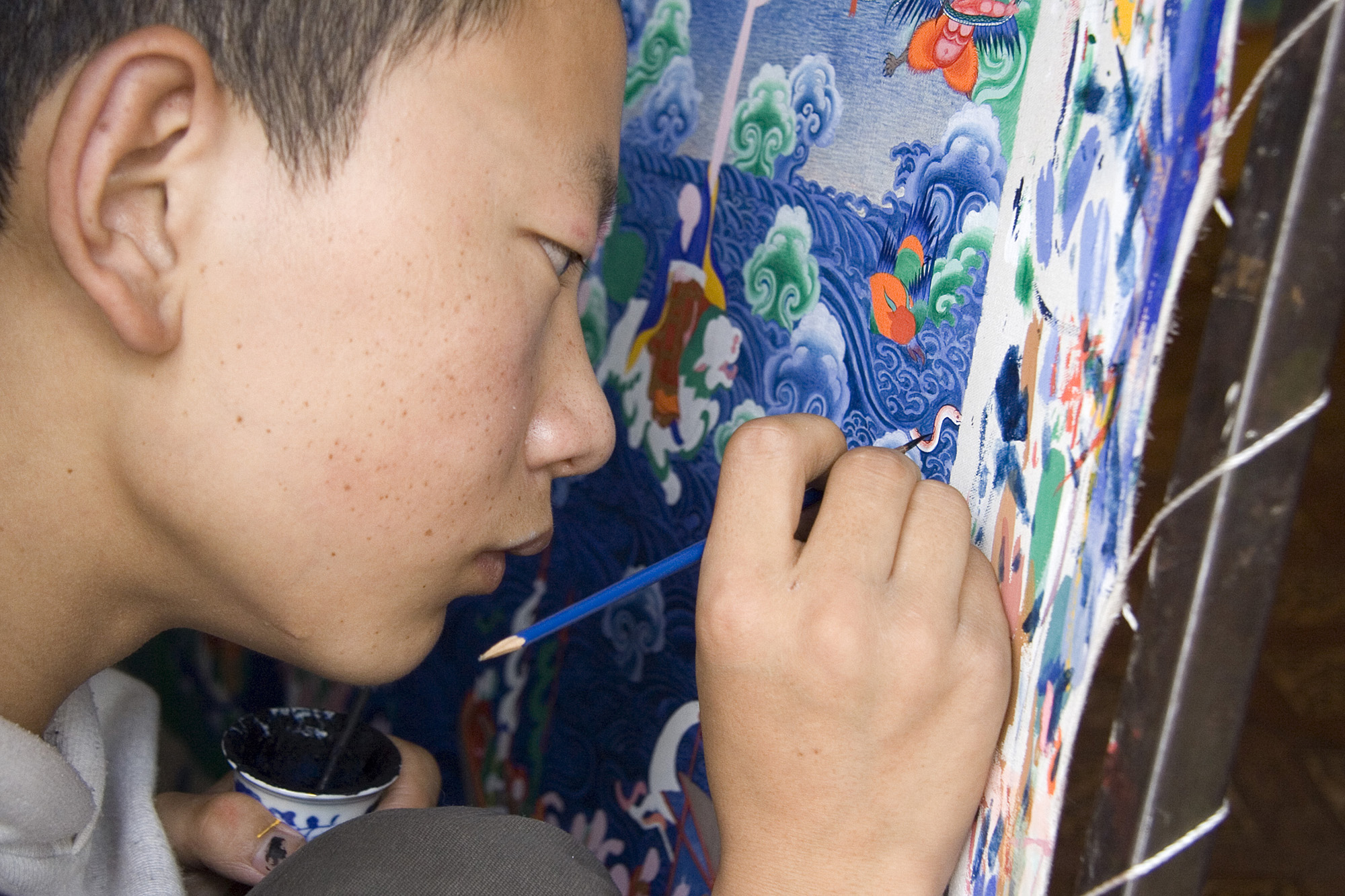
Painting Thangka in Lhasa, Tibet (2006)

== See also ==
- Conservation and restoration of Tibetan thangkas – Preservation of traditional religious Tibetan scroll painting
- Khandu Wangchuk Bhutia – Indian thangka painter
- Tseten Dorjee – Tibetan Thangka Artist (b. 1960)
- Tree of physiology – Tibetan thangka
