= Tseten Dorjee =

Tibetan thangka artist (b. 1960)

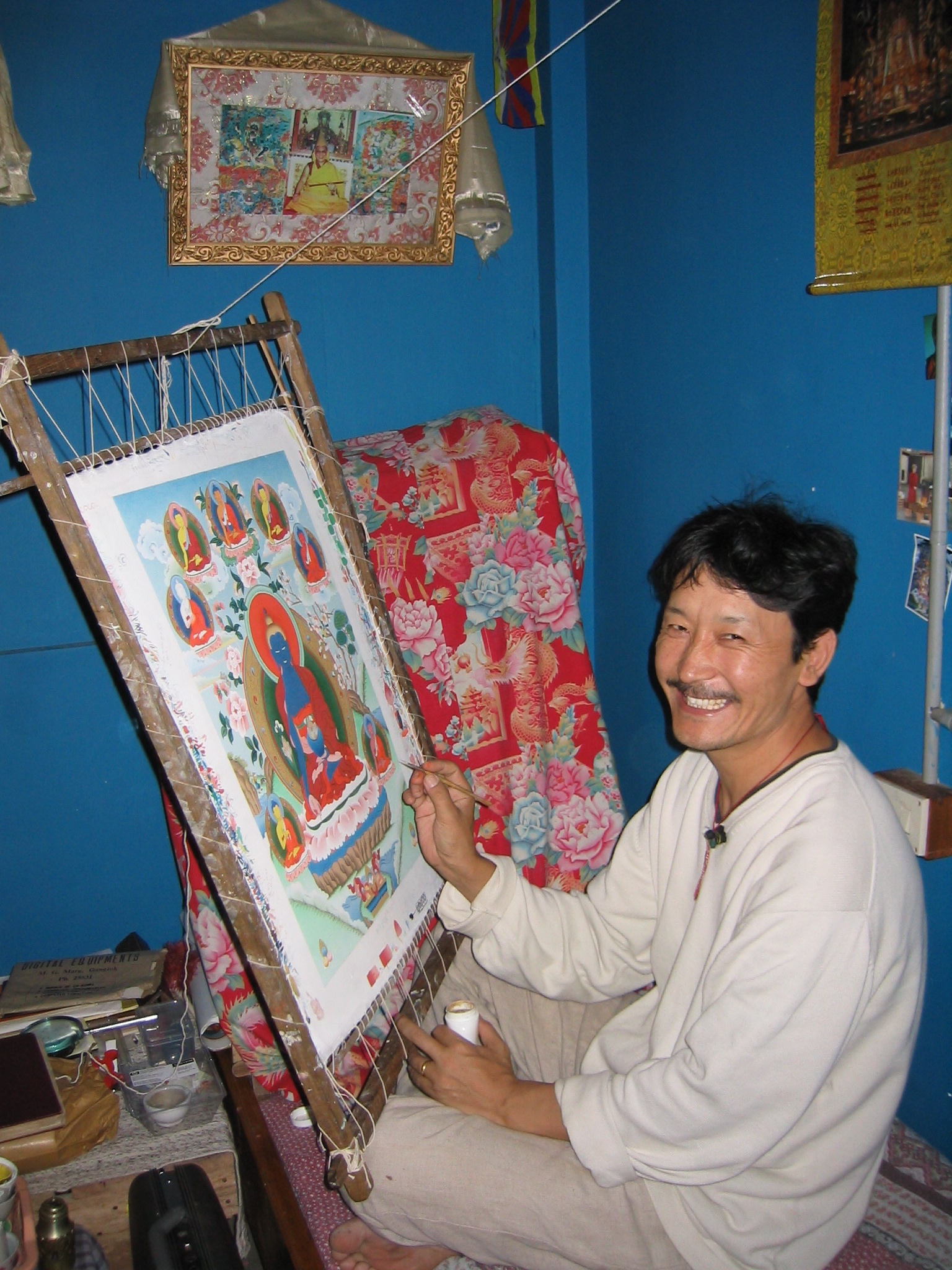

Tseten Dorjee, (born 2 December 1960, Darjeeling, India) is a Tibetan thangka artist.

== Biography ==
Tseten Dorjee was born 2 December 1960 in Darjeeling and lived in India to receive his early education at the Central School for Tibetans, in Darjeeling, India. Dorjee started the study of thangka painting between 1974 and 1980 when he took private lessons from the late Venerable Ngawang Norbu (1903–1996). He continued his study from 1980 to 1986 at the Gyudmed Tantric Monastery, located in Mysore, South India.

Dorjee received commissions from the 14th Dalai Lama, the Royal Family of Sikkim and various major monasteries in India. Dorjee traveled and painted thangkas outside of India in Bhutan, Nepal, Munich and USA.

In accordance with the wish of his teacher, Dorjee started teaching thangka painting in 1995. Over the years, 11 students, after four to five years under his guidance became accomplished thankga painters. As of 2011 he was instructing six full-time students. Dorjee became a faculty member of Naropa University's Study Abroad Program in Sikkim in the fall of 2002. Its Director, Clarke D. Warren, stated, "Being a scholar of Tibetan Buddhism I have been an avid connoisseur of thangka painting for many years and Tseten is amongst the finest I have seen anywhere, in its mastery of tradition, style and execution."

Dorjee founded and serves as director of a non-profit organization that provides medical care, education and clothing and living costs for poor families, needy elders and children.
