= Tsakli =

Tibetan Buddhist ritual paintings

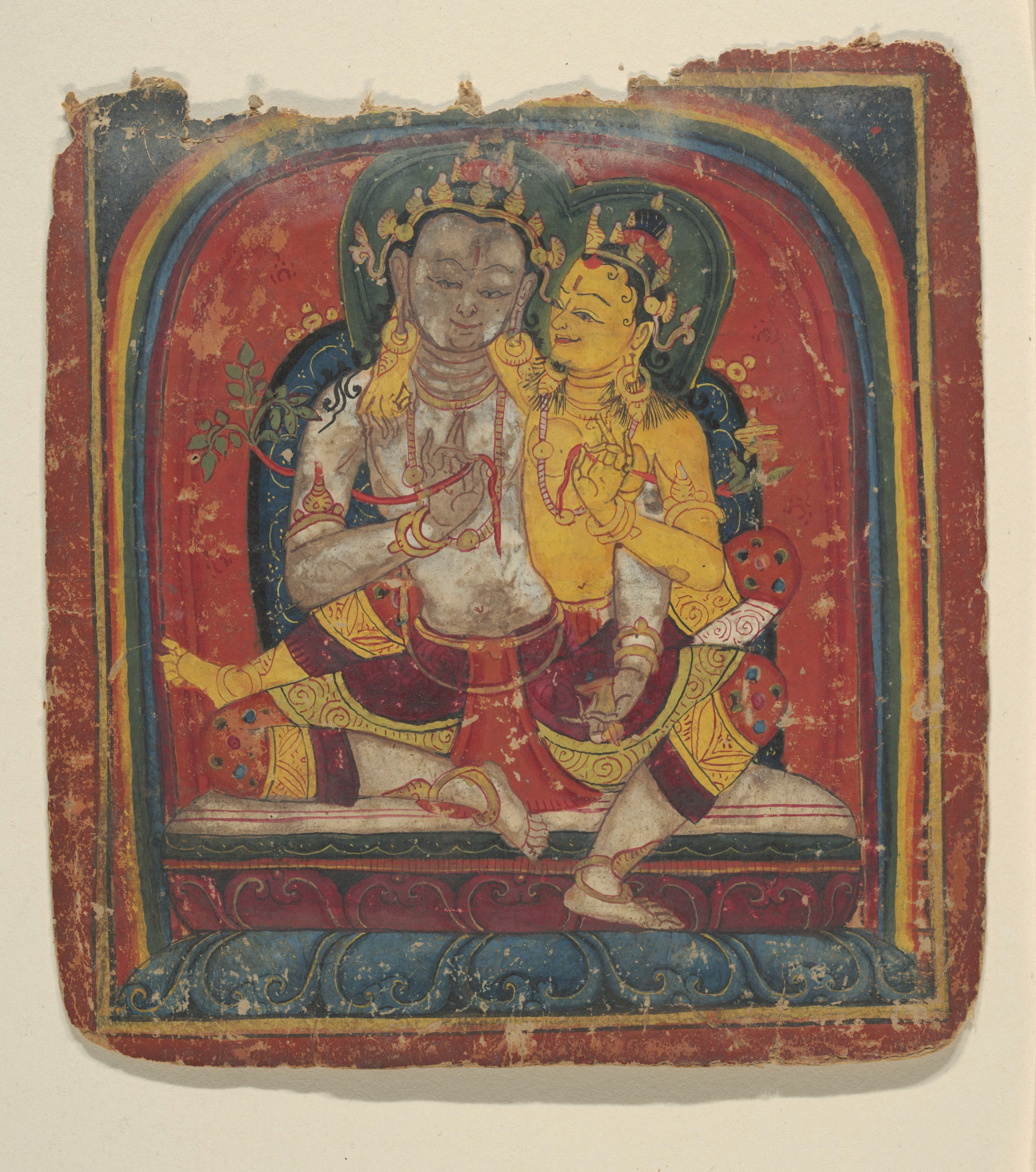
Tsakli, 13-14th century

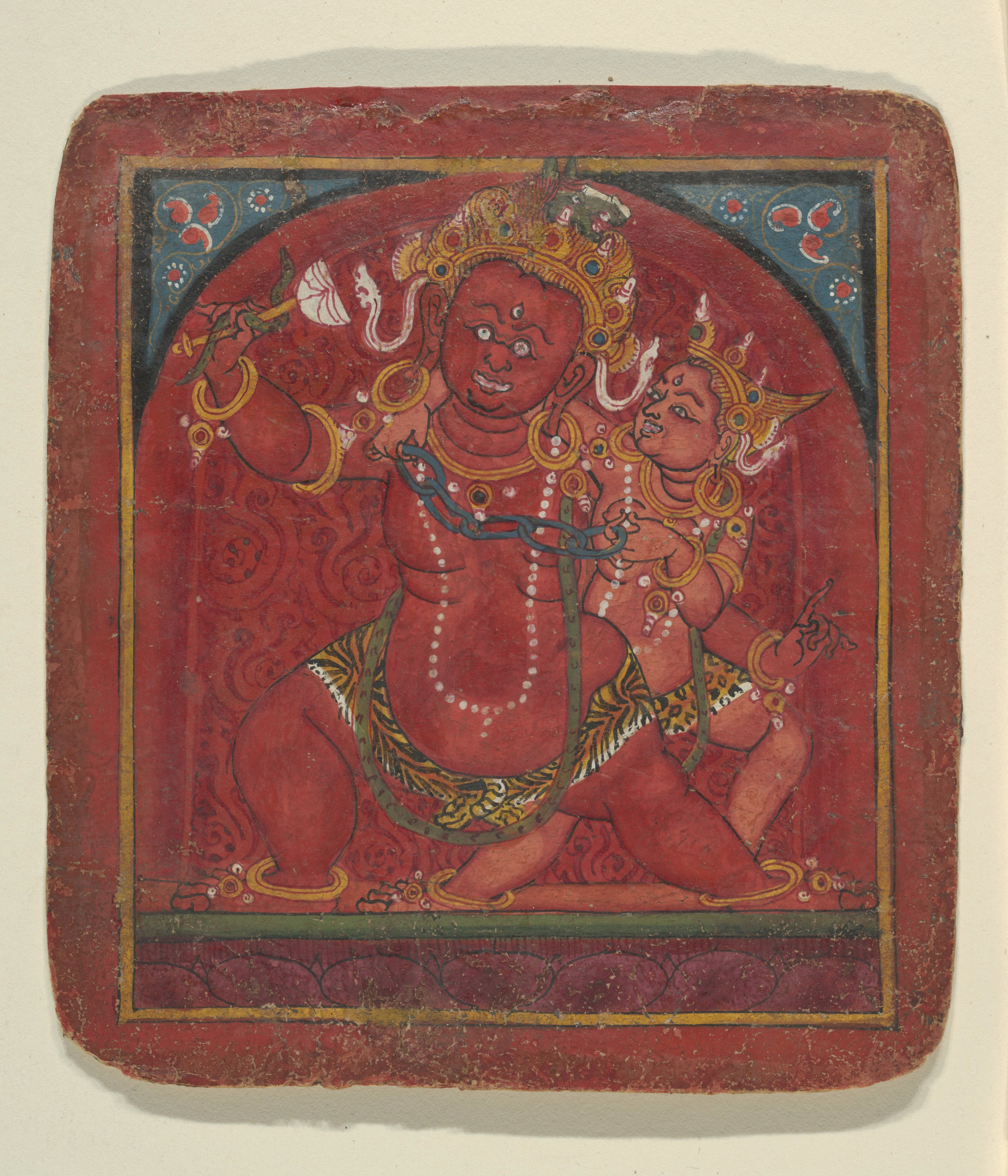
Another from the same set

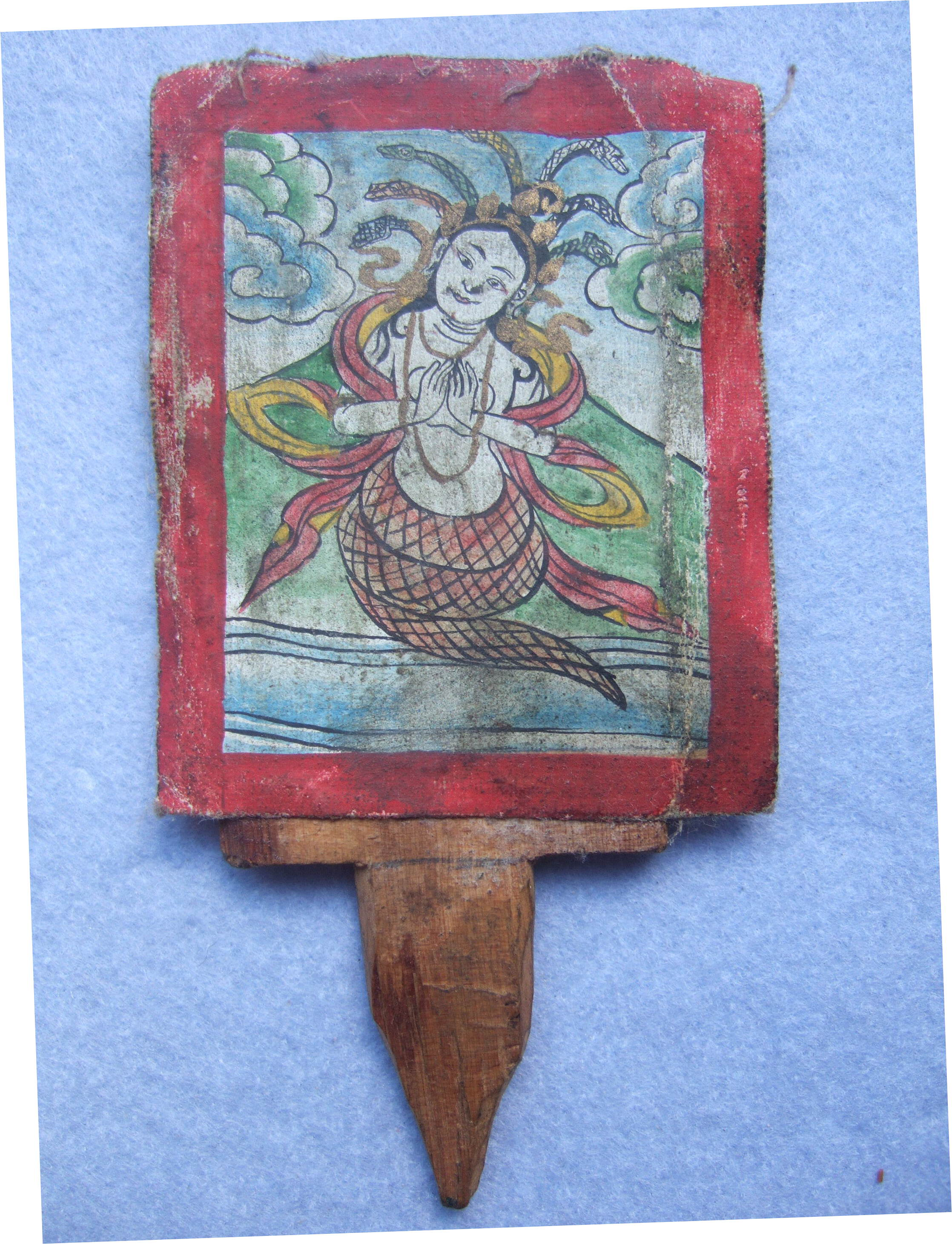
Tibetan tsakli, mid 20th century

Tsakli (also “tsakalis”) are Tibetan Buddhist miniature paintings, normally produced as thematic groups or sets, which are used in rituals as initiation cards, and in the training of monks. Examples of this miniature art are also known from Mongolia.

== Subjects ==
The subjects found on tsakli are similar to the better known larger Tibetan thangka scroll paintings on cloth, but much simpler, usually showing only a single deity, or a pair. The subjects are usually deities or ritual objects and offerings associated with these deities are represented on the tsaklis. Occasionally, Tibetan inscriptions on the backside can identify the subjects which are painted on the front.

== Ritual use of tsakli ==
Tsakli are normally painted in sets which can comprise from six to nearly 100 small paintings of similar subjects and are used as offerings in temples or in rituals. For example, before the construction of a temple is begun, the area can be marked with tsakli representing protective deities. In such cases, they are mounted on small wooden sticks. Similarly, tsakli can be used by a Buddhist lama to remove evil influences from a sick person, from a tree which does not bear fruit, or grain which is going to be threshed. A tsakli can also be placed in a portable shrine or box (Tibetan “gau”) and carried to provide protection to travelers or pilgrims who wear the gau around their neck or on a shoulder strap.

== Materials ==
The majority of tsakli are painted on cloth (like most of the tangkas) or cardboard. There exist also tsakli which are printed from woodblocks on cloth or paper. Larger sets of tsakli are kept between two wooden covers in a similar manner as pages of Tibetan books are protected.

== Bibliography ==
- Li, Juan: Tibetan Ritual Miniature Paintings, March 17, 1995 http://www.asianart.com/li/li.html#fnt1
- Karmey, Samten Gyaltsen: The Secret Visions of the Fifth Dalai Lama, The Gold Manuscript in the Fournier Collection Musée Guimet, Paris. Serindia Publications, Second edition, London, 1998 (Numerous tsakli are represented in ritual context in the illustrations of “The Secret Visions” of the Fifth Dalai Lama).
- Olson. Eleanor: Catalogue of the Tibetan collection and other Lamaist Material in the Newark Museum, vol. III, Newark, 1971, p. 72.
- Stein, R.A.: “Trente-trois fiches de divination tibétaines”. Harvard Journal of Asiatic Studies, 4 (1), 1939, p. 297-371.
- Hummel, Andries: Gods, demons and protectors. Tsaklis and other miniatures from Tibet and Mongolia, Cloud Press Delft, Delft, 2018, ISBN 978-90-828827-0-4; 178 pages (This book deals with a large variety of tsaklis from a private collection, with a few hundred reproductions)
