= Vajrayana =

Mahayana Buddhist tantric tradition

Vajrayāna (Sanskrit: वज्रयान, lit. 'Diamond Vehicle or Thunderbolt Vehicle'), otherwise known as Mantrayāna ("Mantra Vehicle"), Guhyamantrayāna ("Secret Mantra Vehicle"), Tantrayāna ("Tantra Vehicle"), Indo-Tibetan Buddhism, Tantric Buddhism, and Esoteric Buddhism, is a vehicle of the Mahāyāna Buddhist tradition that emphasizes esoteric practices and rituals aimed at rapid spiritual awakening. Emerging between the 5th and 7th centuries CE in medieval India, Vajrayāna Buddhism incorporates a range of techniques, including the use of mantras (sacred sounds), dhāraṇīs (mnemonic codes), mudrās (symbolic hand gestures), mandalās (spiritual diagrams), and the visualization of deities and Buddhas. These practices are designed to transform ordinary experiences into spiritual paths toward enlightenment and liberation, often by engaging with aspects of desire and aversion in a ritualized context.

A distinctive feature of Vajrayāna Buddhism is its emphasis on esoteric transmission, where teachings are passed directly from teacher (guru or vajrācārya) to student through initiation ceremonies. Tradition asserts that these teachings have been passed down through an unbroken lineage going back to the historical Buddha (c. the 5th century BCE), sometimes via other Buddhas or bodhisattvas (e.g., Vajrapani). This lineage-based transmission ensures the preservation of the purity and effectiveness of the teachings. Practitioners often engage in deity yoga, a meditative practice where one visualizes oneself as a deity embodying enlightened qualities to transform one's perception of reality. The tradition also acknowledges the role of feminine energy, venerating female Buddhas and ḍākiṇīs (spiritual beings), and sometimes incorporates practices that challenge conventional norms to transcend dualistic thinking.

Vajrayāna has given rise to various sub-traditions across Asia. In Tibet, it evolved into Tibetan Buddhism, which became the dominant spiritual tradition, integrating local beliefs and practices. In Japan, it influenced Shingon Buddhism, established by Kūkai, emphasizing the use of mantras and rituals. Chinese Esoteric Buddhism also emerged, blending Vajrayāna practices with existing Chinese Buddhist traditions; however, this is no longer a separate sect and has mostly mixed in with normal exoteric Buddhism. Each of these traditions adapted Vajrayāna principles to its cultural context while maintaining core esoteric practices aimed at achieving enlightenment.

Central to Vajrayāna symbolism is the vajra, a ritual implement representing indestructibility and irresistible force, embodying the union of transcendental wisdom and compassion. Practitioners often use the vajra in conjunction with a bell during rituals, symbolizing the integration of male and female principles. The tradition also employs rich visual imagery, including mudrās, complex mandalās, and depictions of wrathful deities that serve as meditation aids to help practitioners internalize spiritual concepts and confront inner obstacles on the path to enlightenment.

== Terminology ==
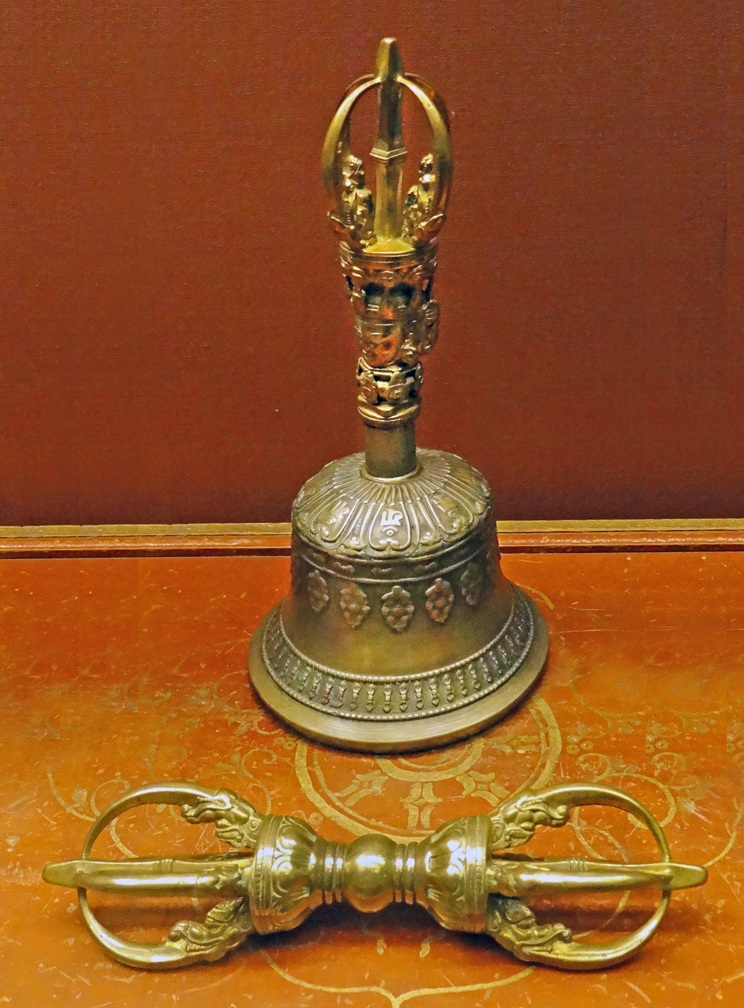
A vajra and bell (ghanta), which are classic ritual symbols of Vajrayāna Buddhism

In medieval India, the initial terms that were used to refer to the tantric Buddhist tradition were Mantranāya ("Path of Mantras") and Mantrayāna ("Mantra Vehicle"). Later, other terms were adopted, like Vajrayāna ("Diamond Vehicle" or "Thunderbolt Vehicle").

In Tibetan Buddhism practiced in the Himalayan regions of India, Nepal, Tibet, and Bhutan, Buddhist Tantra is most often termed Vajrayāna (Tib. རྡོ་རྗེ་ཐེག་པ་, dorje tekpa, Wyl. rdo rje theg pa) and Secret mantra (Skt. Guhyamantra, Tib. གསང་སྔགས་, sang ngak, Wyl. gsang sngags). The vajra is a mythical weapon associated with Indra that was said to be indestructible and unbreakable (like a diamond) and extremely powerful (like a thunderbolt). Thus, the term is variously translated as Diamond Vehicle, Thunderbolt Vehicle, Indestructible Vehicle, and so on.

The vajra, or diamond, is an adamantine symbol. A diamond has two qualities: it has the power to shatter all ordinary stones, and conversely, no stone can break a diamond. The actual vajra is the mind that has the realization of the ultimate truth inseparably merged with a special kind of tantric bliss. [...] That is why the vajra, or diamond, is the symbol of the tantric path and its result: the wisdom of nondual emptiness and bliss.

In Chinese Esoteric Buddhism, it is generally known by terms such as Zhēnyán (Chinese: 真言, literally "true word", referring to mantra), Tángmì or Hanmì (唐密 - 漢密, "Tang Esotericism" or "Han Esotericism"), Mìzōng (密宗, "Esoteric Sect"), or Mìjiao (Chinese: 密教; Esoteric Teaching). The Chinese term mì 密 ("secret, esoteric") is a translation of the Sanskrit term Guhya ("secret, hidden, profound, abstruse").

In Japan, Buddhist esotericism is known as Mikkyō (密教, secret teachings) or by the term Shingon (a Japanese rendering of Zhēnyán), which also refers to a specific school of Shingon-shū (真言宗).

The term "Esoteric Buddhism" is first used by Western occultist writers, such as Helena Blavatsky and Alfred Percy Sinnett, to describe theosophical doctrines passed down from "supposedly initiated Buddhist masters."

== Origins ==
According to David B. Gray, Vajrayana originated from pre-existing Tantric traditions, also known as 'Tantrism', which emerged within Hinduism during the first millennium CE. These early Hindu tantric practices had a profound influence on South Asian Mahāyāna Buddhism, leading to the development of distinct Buddhist tantric traditions, which arose in the 7th century CE, rapidly spread across Southeast, East, and Central Asia, giving rise to distinct traditions in East Asia and Tibet.

== History ==
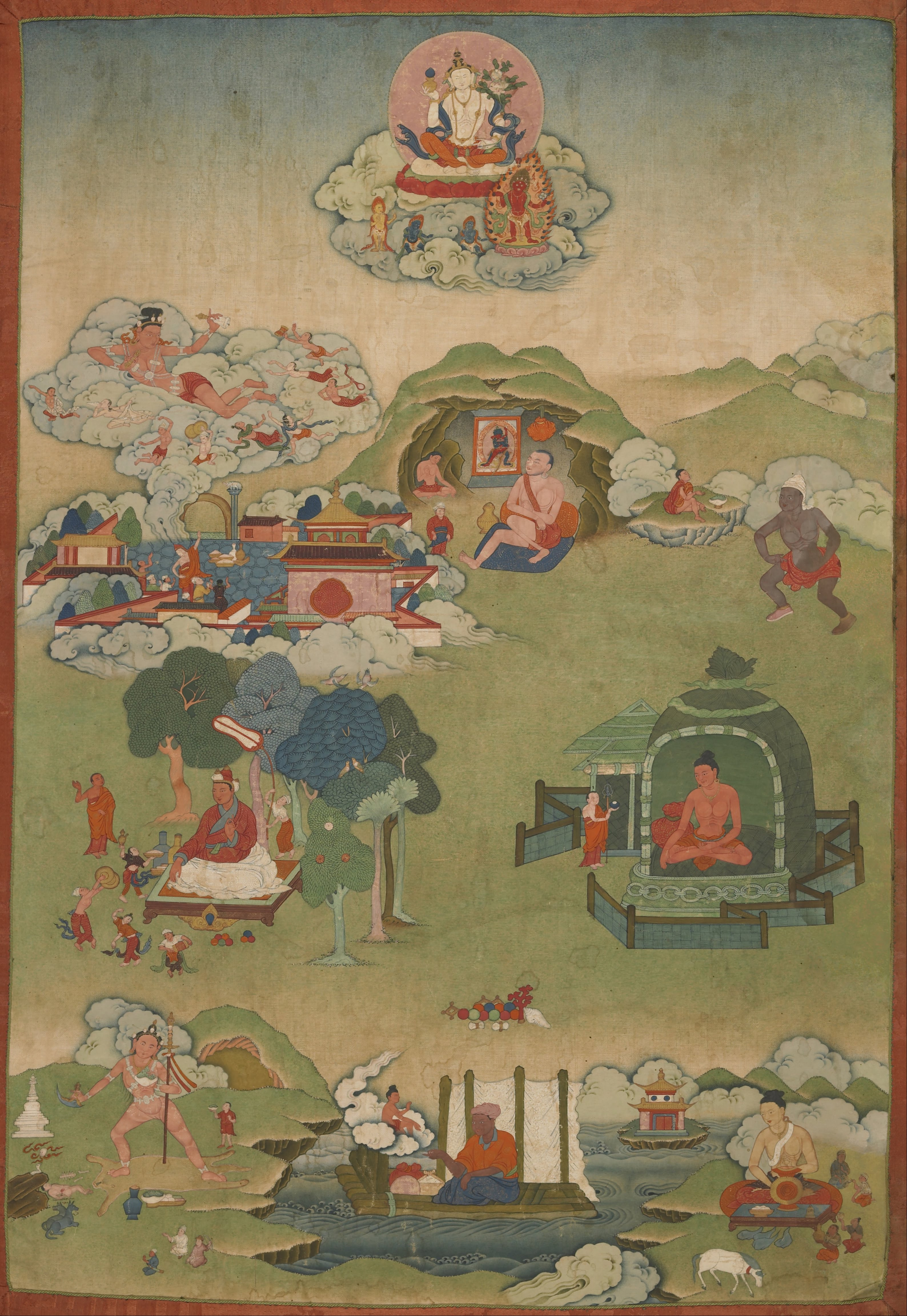
Mahasiddhas, Palpung monastery. Note the figure of the great adept Putalipa at center, seated in a cave and gazing at an image of the meditational deity Samvara and the figure at the bottom left holding a skull-staff (khaṭvāṅga) and a flaying knife (kartika).

=== Mahasiddhas and the tantric movement ===
Tantric Buddhism is associated with groups of wandering yogis called mahasiddhas in medieval India. According to Robert Thurman, these tantric figures thrived during the latter half of the first millennium CE. According to John Myrdhin Reynolds, the mahasiddhas date to the medieval period in North India and used methods radically different from those used in Buddhist monasteries, including practicing on charnel grounds.

Since Tantra focuses on the transformation of poisons into wisdom, the yogic circles came together in tantric feasts, often in sacred sites (pitha) and places (ksetra), which included dancing, singing, consort practices, and the ingestion of taboo substances like alcohol, urine, and meat. At least two of the mahasiddhas cited in the Buddhist literature are comparable with the Shaiva Nath saints (Gorakshanath and Matsyendranath) who practiced Hatha Yoga.

According to Schumann, a movement called Sahaja-siddhi developed in the 8th century in Bengal. It was dominated by long-haired, wandering mahasiddhas who openly challenged and ridiculed the Buddhist establishment. The mahasiddhas pursued siddhis, magical powers such as flight and extrasensory perception as well as spiritual liberation.

=== Tantras ===
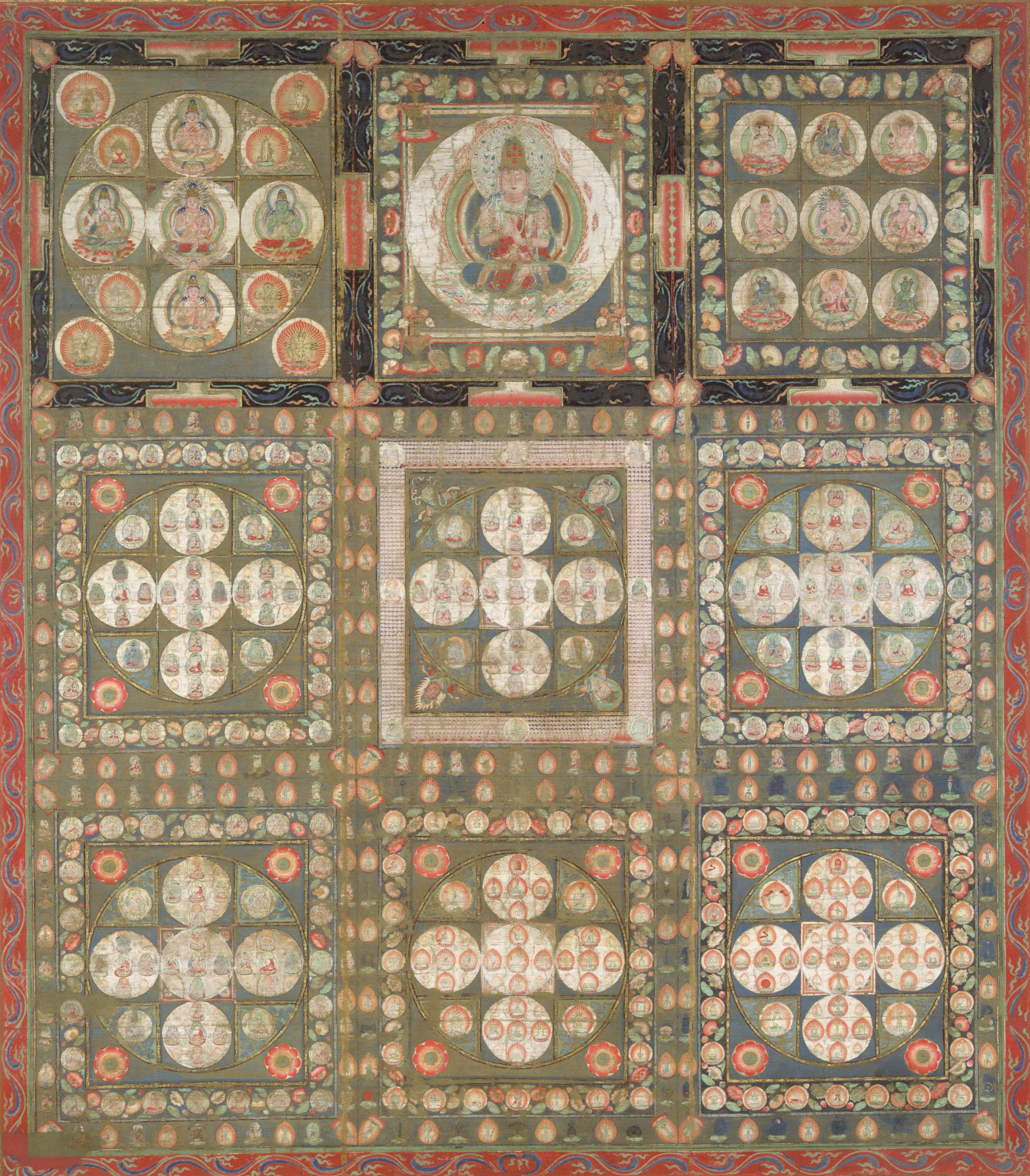
Vajra Realm Mandala, based on the tantric Vajrasekhara Sutra, and symbolizing the final realization of Vairocana Buddha in Shingon

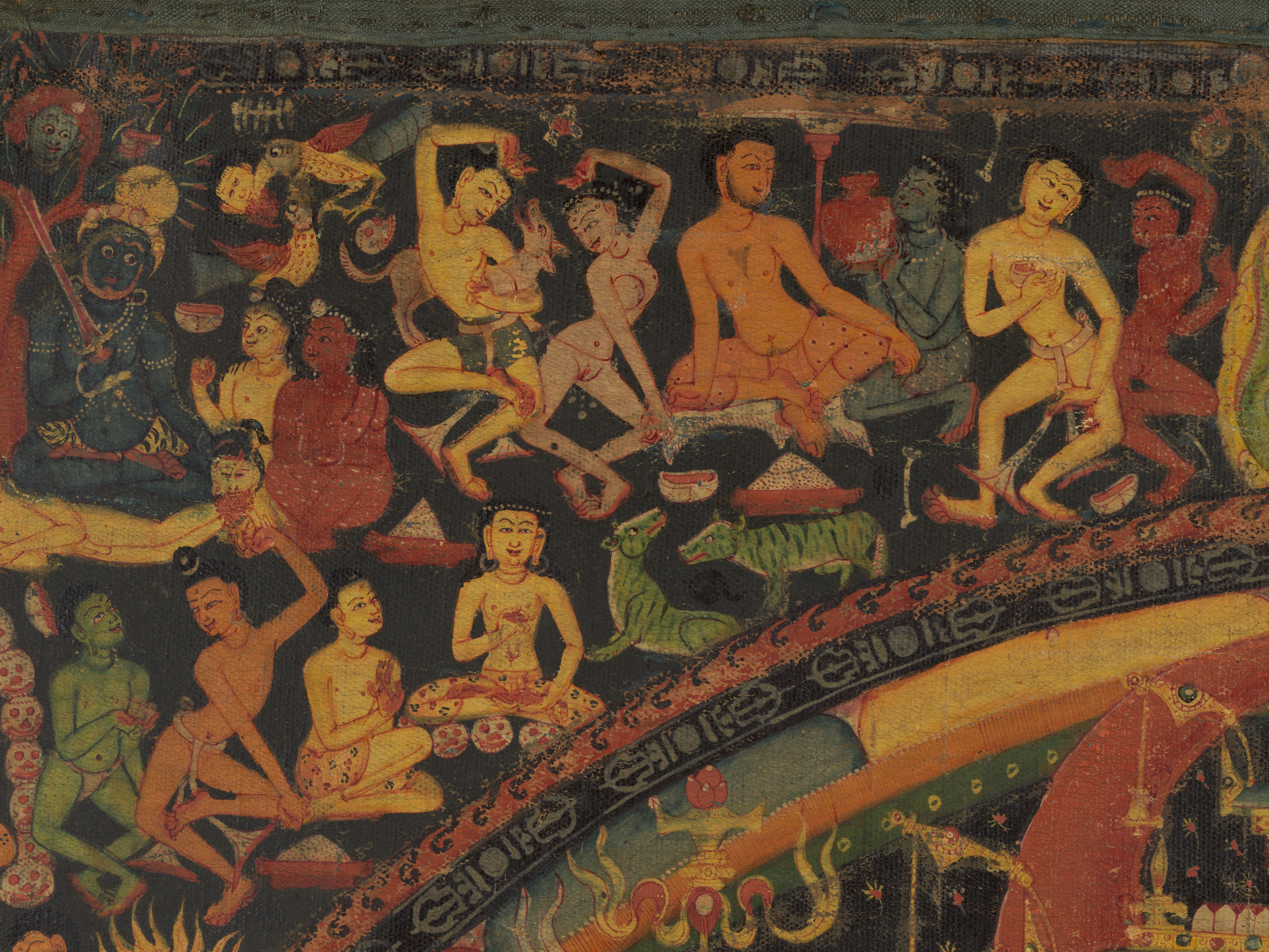
Naked tantrikas dancing and eating from skull cups (kapalas), closeup of a Chakrasamvara mandala

Mahāyāna sutras contain "proto-tantric" material, such as the Gandavyuha and the Dasabhumika, which might have served as a central source of visual imagery for Tantric texts. Later Mahāyāna texts like the Kāraṇḍavyūha Sūtra (c. 4th–5th century CE) expound the use of mantras such as Om mani padme hum, associated with vastly powerful beings like Avalokiteshvara. The Heart Sutra also includes a mantra.

Vajrayāna Buddhists developed a large corpus of texts, the Buddhist Tantras, some of which can be traced to at least the 7th century CE but might be older. The dating of the tantras is "a difficult, indeed an impossible task", according to David Snellgrove.

Some of the earliest of these texts, Kriya tantras such as the Mañjuśrī-mūla-kalpa (c. 6th century), teach the use of mantras and dharanis for mostly worldly ends, including curing illness, controlling the weather and generating wealth. The Tattvasaṃgraha Tantra (Compendium of Principles), classed as a "Yoga tantra", is one of the first Buddhist tantras that focuses on liberation as opposed to worldly goals. In another early tantra, the Vajrasekhara (Vajra Peak), the influential schema of the five Buddha families is developed. Other early tantras include the Mahāvairocana Abhisaṃbodhi and the Guhyasamāja (Gathering of Secrets).

The Guhyasamāja is a Mahayoga class of Tantra, which features forms of ritual practice considered "left-hand" (vamachara), such as use of taboo substances like alcohol, consort practices, and charnel ground practices that evoke wrathful deities. Ryujun Tajima divides the tantras into those that were "a development of Mahāyānist thought" and those "formed in a rather popular mould toward the end of the eighth century and declining into the esoterism of the left". This "left esoterism" mainly refers to the Yogini tantras and later works associated with wandering yogis. This practice survives in Tibetan Buddhism, but it is rare for this to be done with an actual person. It is more common for a yogi or yogini to use an imagined consort (a buddhist tantric deity, i.e. a yidam).

Later tantras such as the Hevajra Tantra and the Chakrasamvara are classed as "Yogini tantras" and represent the final form of development of Indian Buddhist tantras in the ninth and tenth centuries. The Kalachakra tantra developed in the 10th century. It is farthest removed from the earlier Buddhist traditions, and incorporates concepts of messianism and astrology not present elsewhere in Buddhist literature.

According to Ronald M. Davidson, the rise of Tantric Buddhism was a response to the feudal structure of Indian society in the early medieval period (ca. 500–1200 CE), which saw kings divinized as manifestations of gods. Likewise, tantric yogis reconfigured their practice through the metaphor of being consecrated (abhiśeka) as the overlord (rājādhirāja) of a mandala palace of divine vassals, an imperial metaphor symbolizing kingly fortresses and their political power.

=== Relationship to Shaivism ===
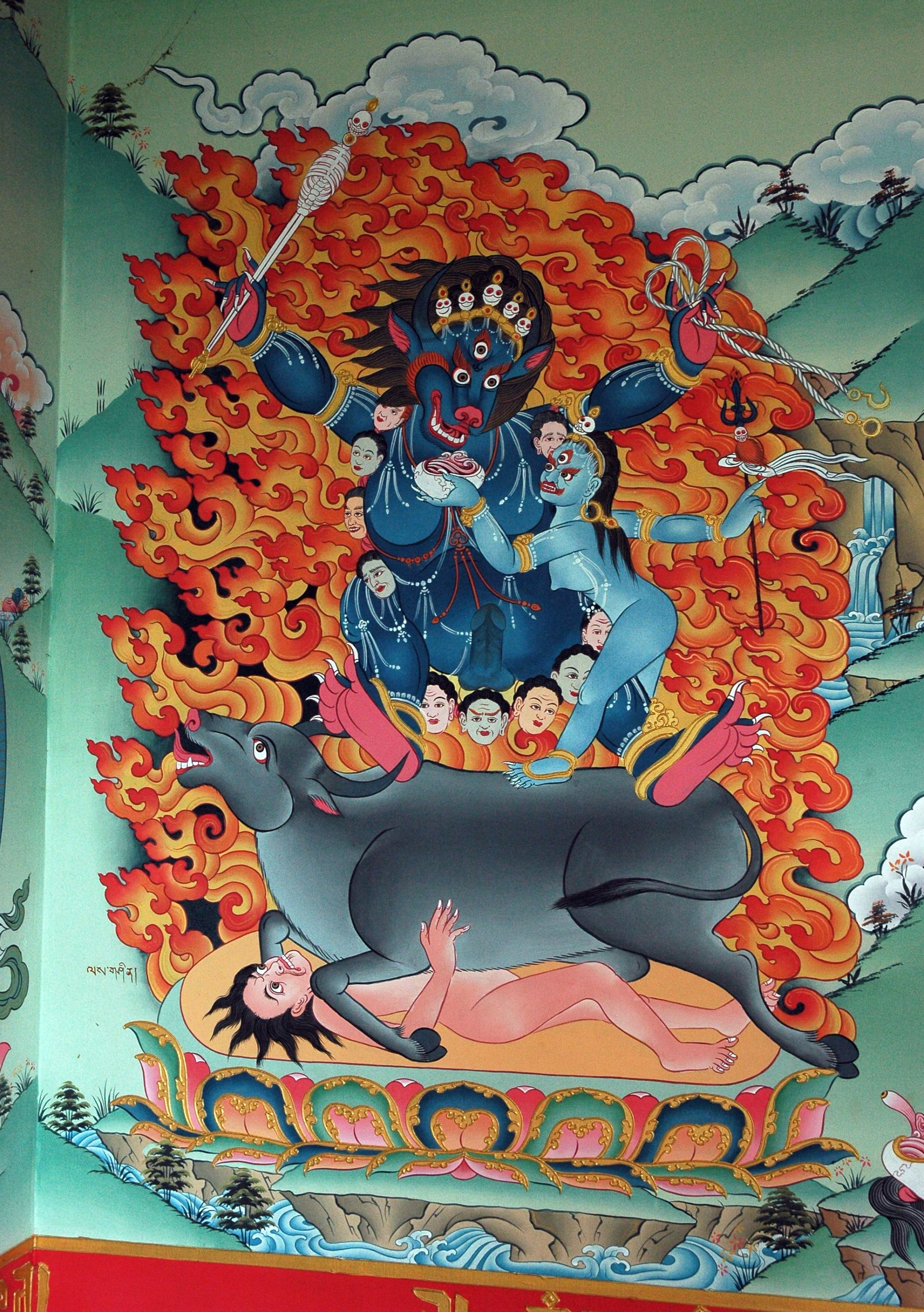
Vajrayana adopted deities such as Bhairava, known as Yamantaka in Tibetan Buddhism.

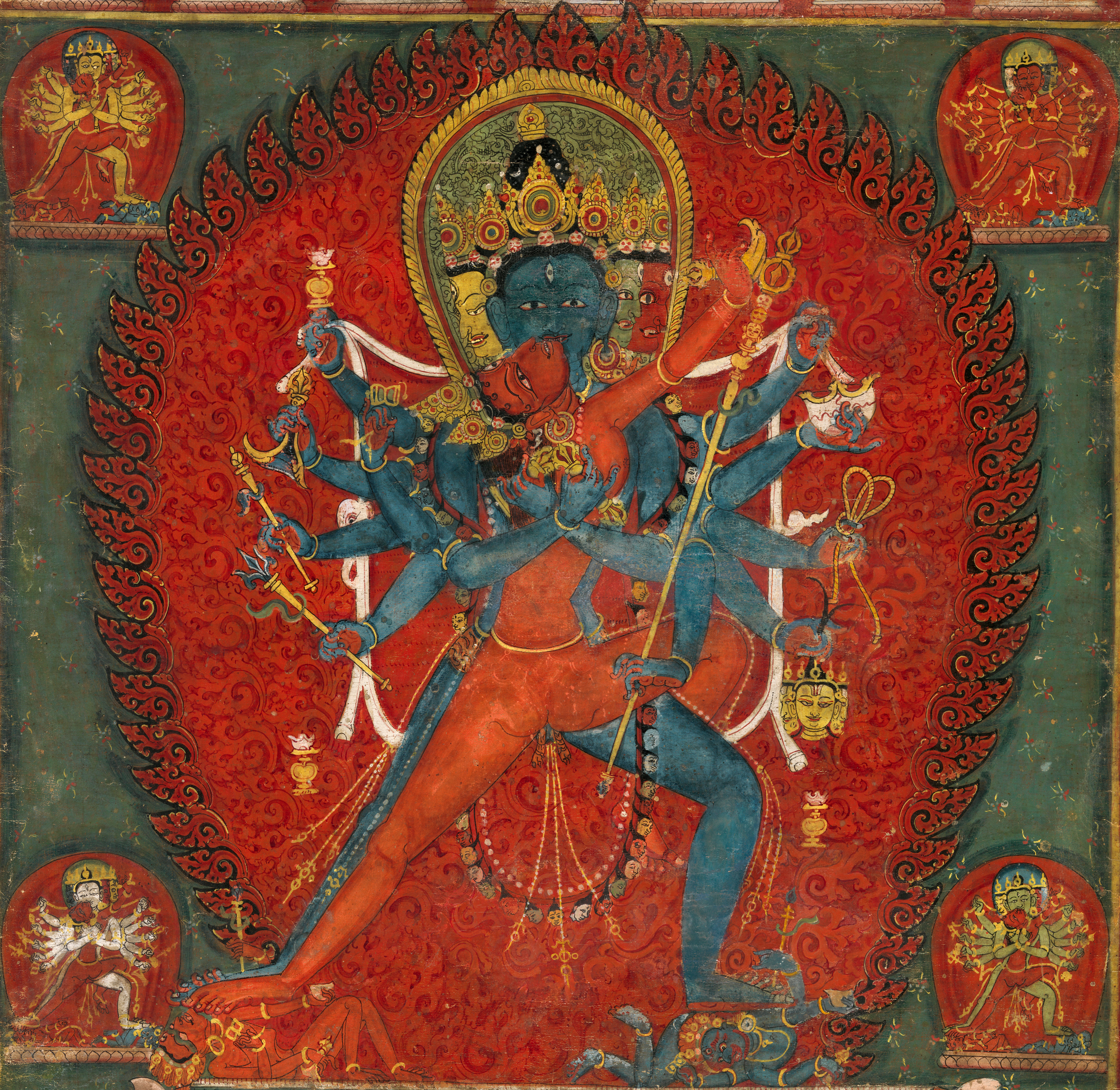
The central deity of the Cakrasaṃvara Tantra, which, according to scholars like David B. Gray and Alexis Sanderson, appropriated numerous elements from nondual Shaiva Tantra

The question of the origins of early Vajrayāna has been taken up by various scholars. David Seyfort Ruegg has suggested that Buddhist tantra employed various elements of a "pan-Indian religious substrate" that is not specifically Buddhist, Shaiva or Vaishnava.

According to Alexis Sanderson, various classes of Vajrayāna literature developed as a result of royal courts sponsoring both Buddhism and Shaivism. The relationship between the two systems can be seen in texts like the Mañjusrimulakalpa, which later came to be classified under Kriya tantra, and states that mantras taught in the Shaiva, Garuda, and Vaishnava tantras will be effective if applied by Buddhists since they were all taught originally by Manjushri.

Sanderson notes that the Vajrayāna Yogini tantras draw extensively from the material also present in Shaiva Bhairava tantras classified as Vidyapitha. Sanderson's comparison of them shows similarity in "ritual procedures, style of observance, deities, mantras, mandalas, ritual dress, Kapalika accouterments like skull bowls, specialized terminology, secret gestures, and secret jargons. There is even direct borrowing of passages from Shaiva texts." Sanderson gives numerous examples, such as the Guhyasiddhi of Padmavajra, a work associated with the Guhyasamaja tradition, which prescribes acting as a Shaiva guru and initiating members into Saiva Siddhanta scriptures and mandalas. Sanderson says that the Samvara tantra texts adopted the pitha list from the Shaiva text Tantrasadbhāva, introducing a copying error where a deity was mistaken for a place.

Davidson argues that Sanderson's arguments for direct influence from Shaiva Vidyapitha texts are problematic because "the chronology of the Vidyapitha tantras is by no means so well established" and "the available evidence suggests that received Saiva tantras come into evidence sometime in the ninth to tenth centuries with their affirmation by scholars like Abhinavagupta (c. 1000 c.e.)" Davidson also notes that the list of pithas or sacred places is "certainly not particularly Buddhist, nor are they uniquely Kapalika venues, despite their presence in lists employed by both traditions." He adds that, like the Buddhists, the Shaiva tradition was involved in the appropriation of Hindu and non-Hindu deities, texts, and traditions, an example being "village or tribal divinities like Tumburu".

Davidson adds that Buddhists and Kapalikas as well as other ascetics (possibly Pasupatas) mingled and discussed their paths at various pilgrimage places and that there were conversions between the different groups. Thus he concludes:

The Buddhist-Kapalika connection is more complex than a simple process of religious imitation and textual appropriation. There can be no question that the Buddhist tantras were heavily influenced by Kapalika and other Saiva movements, but the influence was apparently mutual. Perhaps a more nuanced model would be that the various lines of transmission were locally flourishing and that in some areas they interacted, while in others they maintained concerted hostility. Thus the influence was both sustained and reciprocal, even in those places where Buddhist and Kapalika siddhas were in extreme antagonism.

Davidson also argues for the influence of non-Brahmanical and outcaste tribal religions and their feminine deities (such as Parnasabari and Janguli).

=== Traditional legends ===
According to several Buddhist tantras as well as traditional Tibetan Buddhist sources, the Vajrayana tantras were taught by the Buddha Shakyamuni, but only to some individuals. There are several stories and versions of how the tantras were disseminated. The Jñana Tilaka Tantra, for example, has the Buddha say that the tantras will be explained by the bodhisattva Vajrapani. One of the most famous legends is that of king Indrabhuti (also known as King Ja) of Oddiyana (a figure related to Vajrapani, in some cases said to be an emanation of him).

Other accounts attribute the revelation of Buddhist tantras to Padmasambhava, saying that he was an emanation of Amitabha and Avalokiteshvara and that the Buddha predicted his arrival. Some accounts also maintain Padmasambhava is a direct reincarnation of Buddha Shakyamuni.

== Philosophical background ==
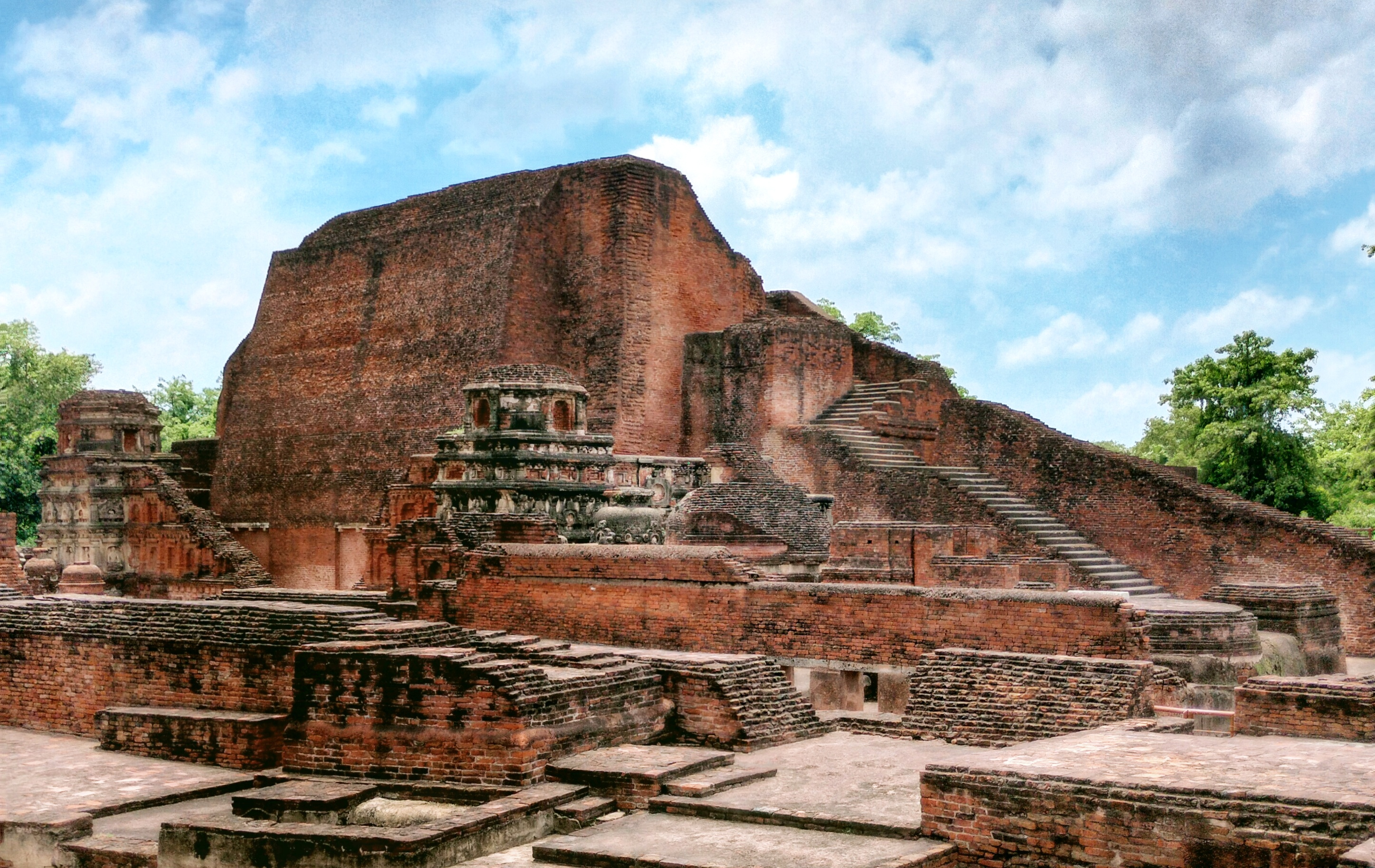
Nalanda Mahavihara, a major center for the study of Vajrayana philosophy during the Pala era.

According to Alex Wayman, the philosophical view of Vajrayana is based on Mahayana Buddhist philosophy, mainly the Madhyamaka and Yogacara schools. The major difference seen by Vajrayana thinkers is the superiority of Tantric methods, which provide a faster vehicle to liberation and contain many more skillful means (upaya).

The importance of the theory of emptiness is central to the Tantric Buddhist view and practice. The Buddhist emptiness view sees the world as fluid, without an ontological foundation or inherent existence, but ultimately a fabric of constructions. Because of this, tantric practice such as self-visualization as the deity is seen as no less real than everyday reality, but a process of transforming reality itself, including the practitioner's identity as the deity. Stephan Beyer notes, "In a universe where all events dissolve ontologically into Emptiness, the touching of Emptiness in the ritual is the re-creation of the world in actuality".

The doctrine of Buddha-nature, as outlined in the Ratnagotravibhāga of Asanga, was also an important theory that became the basis for Tantric views. As explained by the Tantric commentator Lilavajra, this "intrinsic secret [behind] diverse manifestation" is Tantra's utmost secret and aim. According to Wayman, this "Buddha embryo" (tathāgatagarbha) is a "non-dual, self-originated Wisdom (jnana), an effortless fount of good qualities" that resides in the mindstream but is "obscured by discursive thought". This doctrine is often associated with the idea of inherent or natural luminosity (Skt: prakṛti-prabhāsvara-citta, T. ’od gsal gyi sems) or purity of the mind (prakrti-parisuddha).

Another fundamental theory of Tantric practice is that of transformation. In Vajrayāna, negative mental factors such as desire, hatred, greed, and pride are used as part of the path. As French Indologist Madeleine Biardeau notes, the tantric doctrine is "an attempt to place kama, desire, in every meaning of the word, in the service of liberation." This view is outlined in the following passage from the Hevajra tantra:

Those things by which evil men are bound, others turn into means and gain thereby release from the bonds of existence. By passion the world is bound, by passion too it is released, but by heretical Buddhists this practice of reversals is not known.

The Hevajra further states that "one knowing the nature of poison may dispel poison with poison." As Snellgrove notes, this idea is already present in Asanga's Mahayana-sutra-alamkara-karika and therefore it is possible that he was aware of Tantric techniques, including sexual yoga.

According to Buddhist Tantra, there is no strict separation of the profane or samsara and the sacred or nirvana; rather, they exist in a continuum. Everyone is seen as containing the seed of enlightenment, which is covered over by defilements. Douglas Duckworth notes that Vajrayana sees Buddhahood not as something outside or an event in the future, but as immanently present.

Indian Tantric Buddhist philosophers such as Buddhaguhya, Vimalamitra, Ratnākaraśānti, and Abhayakaragupta continued the tradition of Buddhist philosophy and adapted it to their commentaries on the major Tantras. Abhayakaragupta's Vajravali is a key source in the theory and practice of tantric rituals. After monks such as Vajrabodhi and Śubhakarasiṃha brought Tantra to Tang China (716 to 720), tantric philosophy continued to be developed in Chinese and Japanese by thinkers such as Yi Xing and Kūkai.

Likewise in Tibet, Sakya Pandita (1182–28 – 1251), as well as later thinkers like Longchenpa (1308–1364) expanded on these philosophies in their tantric commentaries and treatises. The status of the tantric view continued to be debated in medieval Tibet. Tibetan Buddhist Rongzom Chokyi Zangpo (1012–1088) held that the views of sutra such as Madhyamaka were inferior to that of tantra, which was based on basic purity of ultimate reality. Tsongkhapa (1357–1419), on the other hand, held that there is no difference between Vajrayāna and other forms of Mahāyāna in terms of prajnaparamita (perfection of insight) itself, only that Vajrayāna works faster.

== Place within Buddhist tradition ==
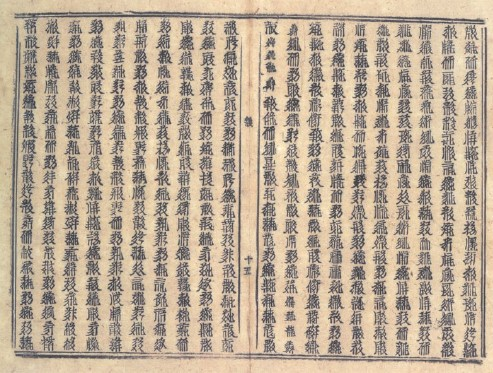
Tangut Auspicious Tantra of All-Reaching Union

Various classifications distinguish Vajrayāna from other Buddhist traditions. Vajrayāna can be seen as a third yana, next to Śrāvakayāna and Mahayana. Vajrayāna can be distinguished from Sutrayana. Sutrayana is the method of perfecting good qualities, where Vajrayāna is the method of taking the intended outcome of Buddhahood as the path. Vajrayāna can also be distinguished from the paramitayana. According to this schema, Indian Mahāyāna revealed two vehicles (yana) or methods for attaining enlightenment: the method of the perfections (Paramitayana) and the method of mantra (Mantrayana).

The Paramitayana consists of the six or ten paramitas, of which the scriptures say that it takes three incalculable aeons to lead one to Buddhahood. The tantra literature, on the other hand, says that Mantrayana leads one to Buddhahood in a single lifetime. According to the literature, the mantra is an easy path without the difficulties of Paramitayana. Mantrayana is sometimes portrayed as a method for those of inferior abilities, but the practitioner of mantra must still adhere to the Bodhisattva vow.

== Characteristics ==
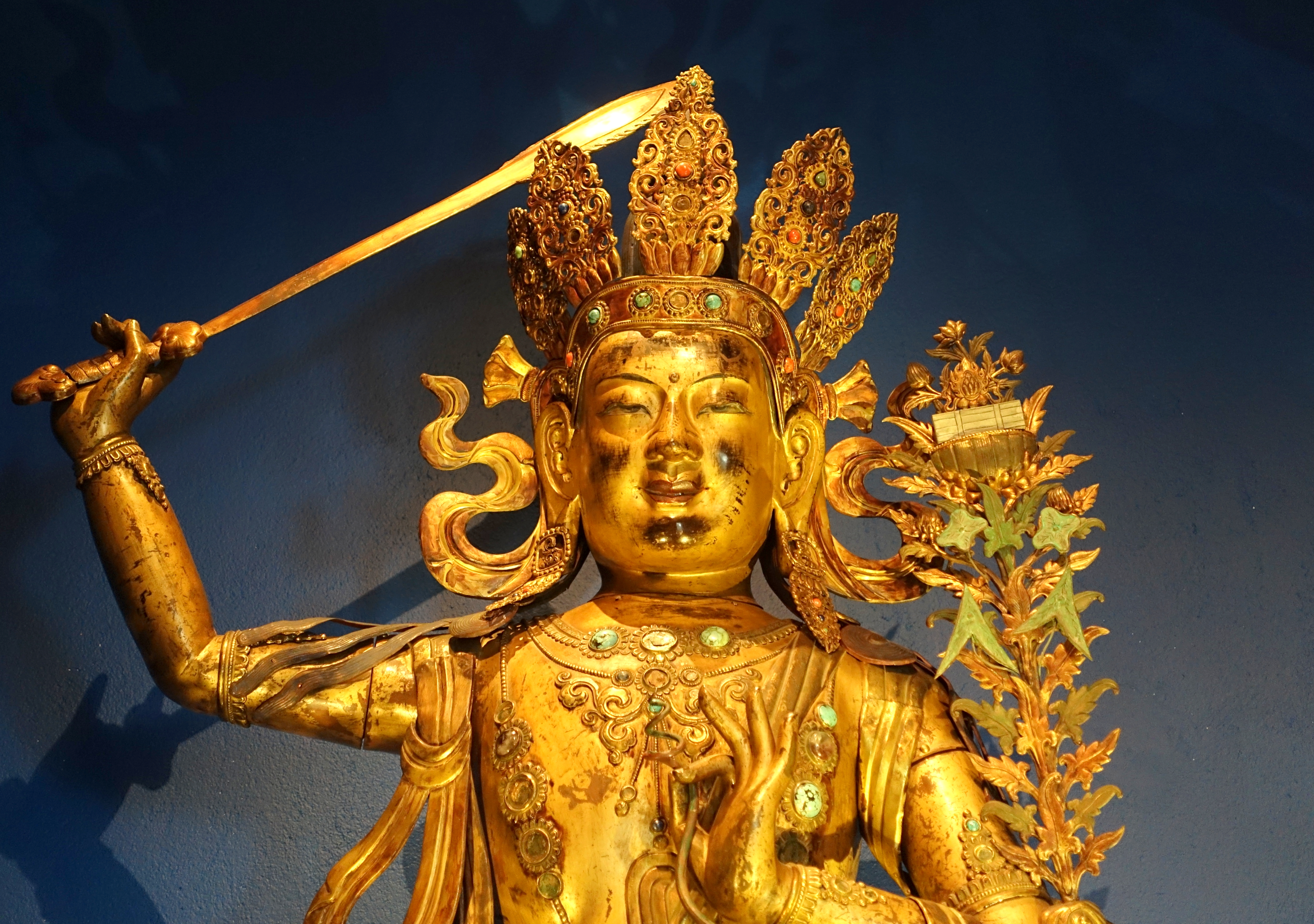
Manjushri, the bodhisattva associated with prajñā

=== Goal ===
The goal of spiritual practice in the Mahāyāna and Vajrayāna traditions is to become a Sammāsambuddha (fully awakened Buddha); those on this path are termed Bodhisattvas. As with the Mahāyāna, motivation is a vital component of Vajrayāna practice. The Bodhisattva-path is an integral part of Vajrayāna, which teaches that all practices are to be undertaken with the motivation to achieve Buddhahood for the benefit of all sentient beings.

In the vehicle of Sutra Mahāyāna, the "path of the cause" is taken whereby a practitioner starts with his or her potential Buddha-nature and nurtures it to produce the fruit of Buddhahood. In Vajrayāna, the "path of the fruit" is taken whereby the practitioner takes his or her innate Buddha-nature as the means of practice. Experiencing ultimate truth is said to be the purpose of all the various tantric techniques practiced in Vajrayana.

=== Esoteric transmission ===
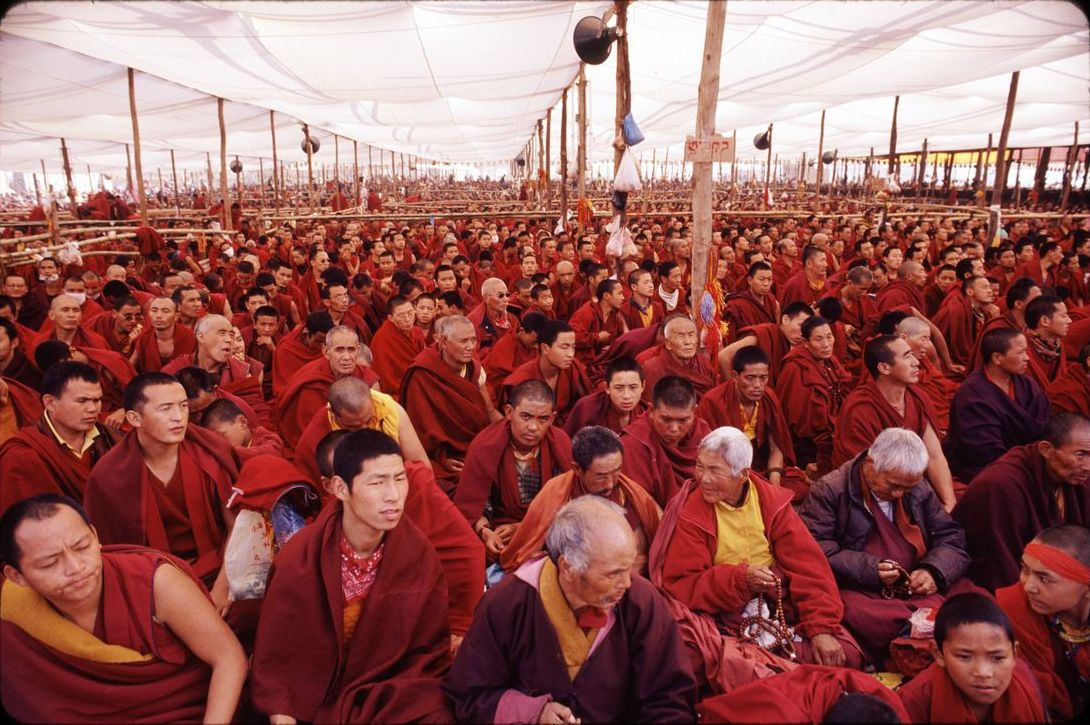
Monks attending the 2003 Kalachakra empowerment in Bodhgaya, India. Some empowerment ceremonies can include large numbers of initiates.

Vajrayāna Buddhism is esoteric in the sense that the transmission of certain teachings occurs only from teacher to student during an empowerment (abhiṣeka), and their practice requires initiation in a ritual space containing the mandala of the deity. Because of their role in giving access to the practices and guiding the student through them, the Vajracharya Lama is considered indispensable in Vajrayāna.

The secrecy of teachings was often protected through the use of allusive, indirect, symbolic, and metaphorical language (twilight language) that required interpretation and guidance from a teacher. The teachings may also be considered "self-secret", meaning that even if they were to be told directly to a person, that person would not necessarily understand the teachings without proper context. In this way, the teachings are "secret" to the minds of those who are not following the path with more than simple curiosity.

Esler points out that while secrecy is presented as necessary to prevent the teachings from falling into the hands of unworthy recipients, it also serves to demarcate a kind of religious in-group. He observes that from an anthropological perspective, allowing reference to the secret to "remain close to the social surface" through veiled allusions plays a more important role in some ways than the secret content itself, as it mobilizes the secret as a kind of symbolic capital.

=== Affirmation of the feminine, antinomian and taboo ===
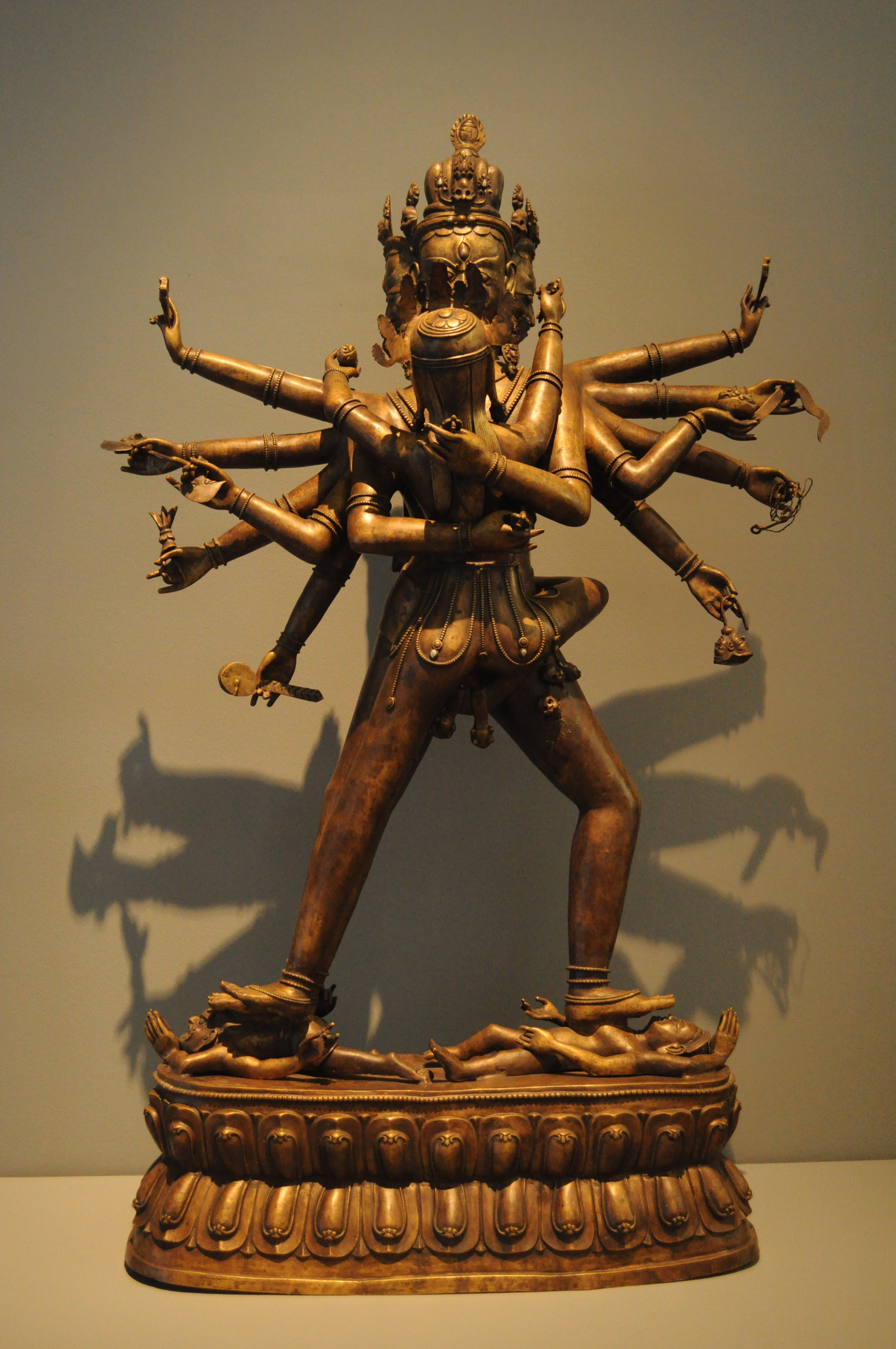
Tibetan Chakrasamvara statue in Yab-Yum union with his consort Vajravārāhī

Some Vajrayāna rituals traditionally included the use of certain taboo substances, such as blood, semen, alcohol, and urine, as ritual offerings and sacraments, though some of these are often replaced with less taboo substances such as yogurt. Tantric feasts and initiations sometimes employed substances like human flesh, as noted by Kahha's Yogaratnamala.

The use of these substances is related to the non-dual (advaya) nature of a Buddha's wisdom (buddhajñana). Since the ultimate state is in some sense non-dual, a practitioner can approach that state by "transcending attachment to dual categories such as pure and impure, permitted and forbidden". As the Guhyasamaja Tantra states, "the wise man who does not discriminate achieves Buddhahood".

Vajrayāna rituals also include sexual yoga, union with a physical consort as part of advanced practices. Some tantras go further: the Hevajra tantra states, "You should kill living beings, speak lying words, take what is not given, consort with the women of others". While some of these statements were taken literally as part of ritual practice, others, such as killing, were interpreted metaphorically. In the Hevajra, "killing" is defined as developing concentration by killing the life-breath of discursive thoughts. Likewise, while actual sexual union with a physical consort is practiced, it is also common to use a visualized consort.

Wayman points out that the symbolic meaning of tantric sexuality is ultimately rooted in bodhicitta and the bodhisattva's quest for enlightenment is likened to a lover seeking union with the mind of the Buddha. Judith Simmer-Brown notes the importance of the psycho-physical experiences arising in sexual yoga, termed "great bliss" (mahasukha): "Bliss melts the conceptual mind, heightens sensory awareness, and opens the practitioner to the naked experience of the nature of mind." This tantric experience is not the same as ordinary self-gratifying sexual passion since it relies on tantric meditative methods using the illusory body and visualizations as well as the motivation for enlightenment. The Hevajra tantra says:

This practice [of sexual union with a consort] is not taught for the sake of enjoyment, but for the examination of one's own thought, whether the mind is steady or waving.

Feminine deities and forces are a major element of Vajrayāna. In the Yogini tantras in particular, women and female yoginis are given high status as the embodiment of female deities such as the wild and nude Vajrayogini. The Candamaharosana Tantra (viii:29–30) states:

Women are heaven, women are the teaching (dharma)
Women indeed are the highest austerity (tapas)
Women are the Buddha, women are the Sangha
Women are the Perfection of Wisdom.

In India, there is evidence that women participated in tantric practice alongside men and were also teachers, adepts, and authors of tantric texts.

=== Vows and behaviour ===
Practitioners of Vajrayāna must abide by various tantric vows or pledges called samaya. These are extensions of the rules of the Prātimokṣa and Bodhisattva vows for the lower levels of tantra, and are taken during initiations into the empowerment for a particular Unsurpassed Yoga Tantra. The special tantric vows vary depending on the specific mandala practice for which the initiation is received and on the level of initiation. Ngagpas of the Nyingma school keep a special non-celibate ordination.

A tantric guru, or teacher, is expected to keep his or her samaya vows in the same way as his students. Proper conduct is considered especially necessary for a qualified Vajrayana guru. For example, the Ornament for the Essence of Manjushrikirti states:

Distance yourself from Vajra Masters who are not keeping the three vows
who keep on with a root downfall, who are miserly with the Dharma,
and who engage in actions that should be forsaken.
Those who worship them go to hell and so on as a result.

== Tantra techniques ==
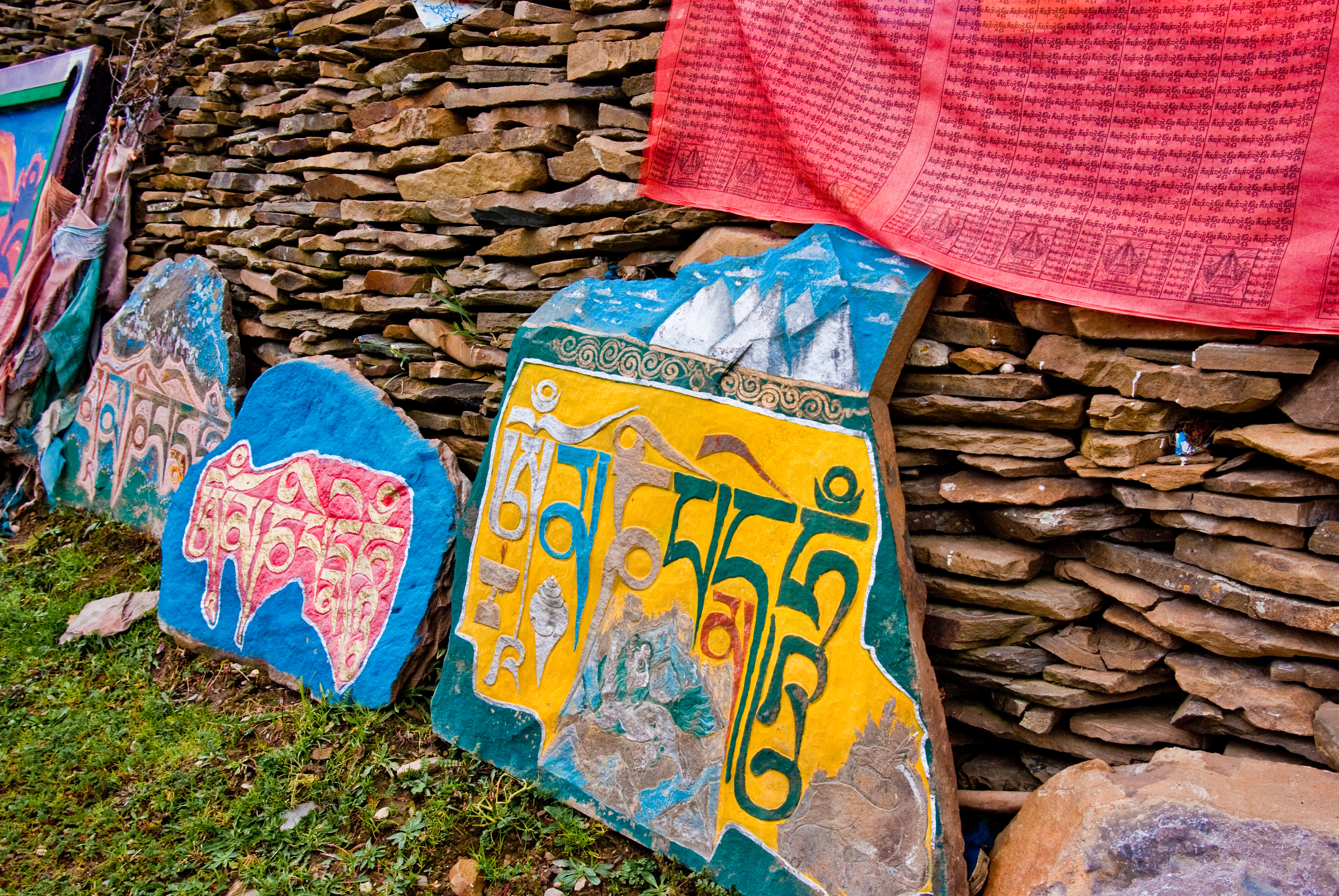
Mani stones, stones inscribed with the "om mani padme hum" mantra

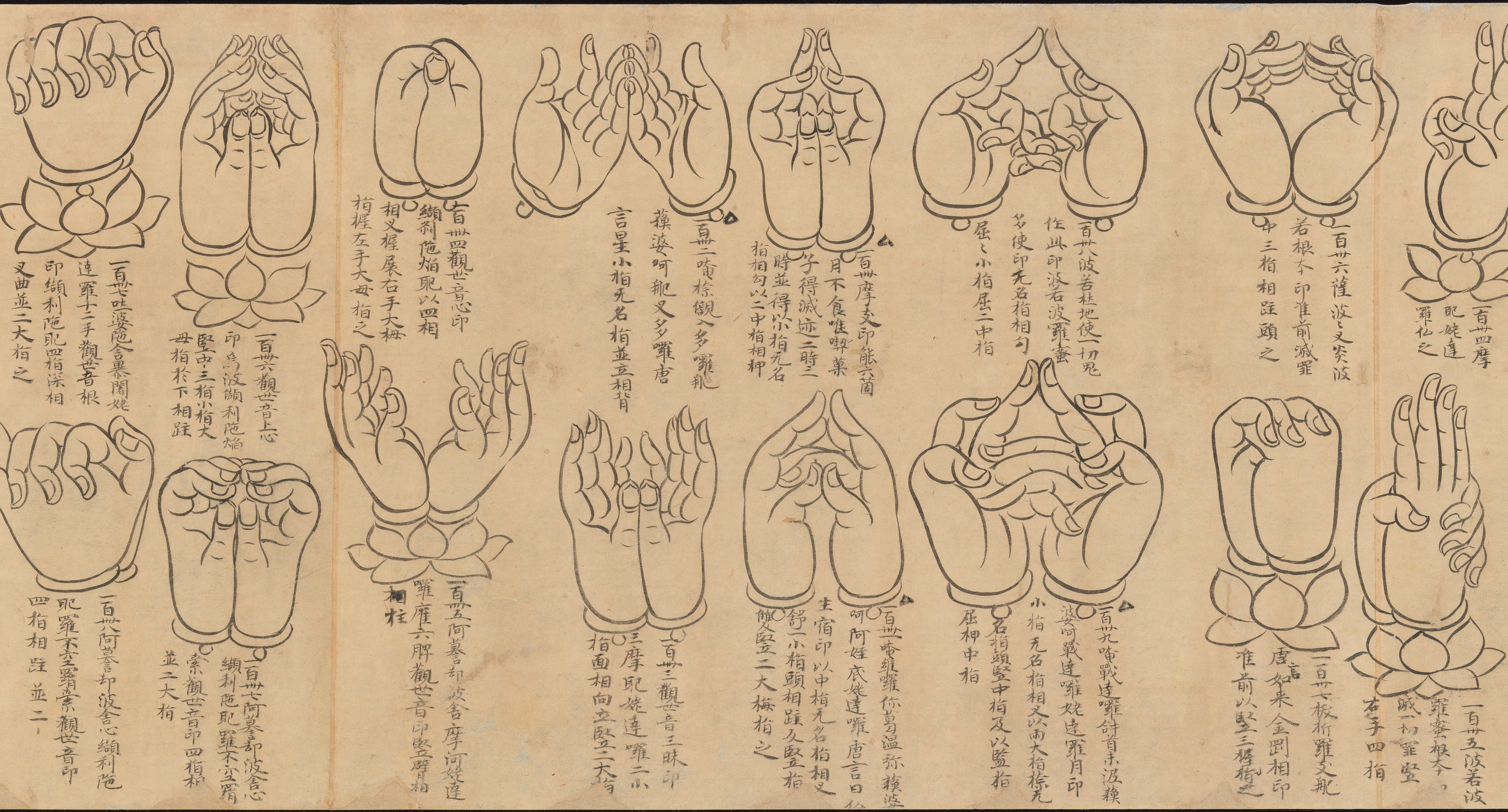
A Japanese Handscroll depicting various mudras, 11th–12th century

While all Vajrayāna Buddhist traditions include all the traditional practices used in Mahāyāna Buddhism, such as developing bodhicitta, practicing the paramitas, and meditations, they also make use of unique tantric methods and Dzogchen meditation, which are seen as more advanced. These include mantras, mandalas, mudras, deity yoga, other visualization-based meditations, illusory body yogas like tummo, and rituals like the goma fire ritual. Vajrayana teaches that these techniques provide a faster path to Buddhahood.

A central feature of tantric practice is the use of mantras and seed syllables (bijas). Mantras are words, phrases, or a collection of syllables used for various meditative, magical, and ritual ends. Mantras are usually associated with specific deities or Buddhas, and are seen as their manifestations in sonic form. They are traditionally believed to have spiritual power, which can lead to enlightenment as well as supramundane abilities (siddhis).

According to Indologist Alex Wayman, Buddhist esotericism centers on what is known as "the three mysteries" or "secrets": the tantric adept affiliates his body, speech, and mind with the body, speech, and mind of a Buddha through mudra, mantras, and samadhi, respectively. Padmavajra (c. 7th century) explains in his Tantrarthavatara Commentary, the secret Body, Speech, and Mind of the Buddhas are:

- Secret of Body: Whatever form is necessary to tame the living beings.
- Secret of Speech: Speech exactly appropriate to the lineage of the creature, as in the language of the yaksas, etc.
- Secret of Mind: Knowing all things as they really are.

These elements are brought together in the practice of tantric deity yoga, which involves visualizing the deity's body and mandala, reciting the deity's mantra, and gaining insight into the nature of things based on this contemplation. Advanced tantric practices such as deity yoga are taught in the context of an initiation ceremony by tantric gurus or vajracharyas (vajra-masters) to the tantric initiate, who also takes on formal commitments or vows (samaya). In Tibetan Buddhism, advanced practices like deity yoga are usually preceded by or coupled with "preliminary practices" called ngondro, consisting of five to seven accumulation practices and includes prostrations and recitations of the 100 syllable mantra.

Vajrayana is a system of tantric lineages, and thus only those who receive an empowerment or initiation (abhiseka) may practice the more advanced esoteric methods. In tantric deity yoga, mantras, or bijas are used during the ritual evocation of deities that are said to arise out of the uttered and visualized mantric syllables. After the deity's image and mandala has been established, heart mantras are visualized as part of the contemplation in different points of the deity's body.

Most Tantric Buddhists believe nirvana is achievable in a single lifetime with "vigorous study and meditation".

=== Deity yoga ===
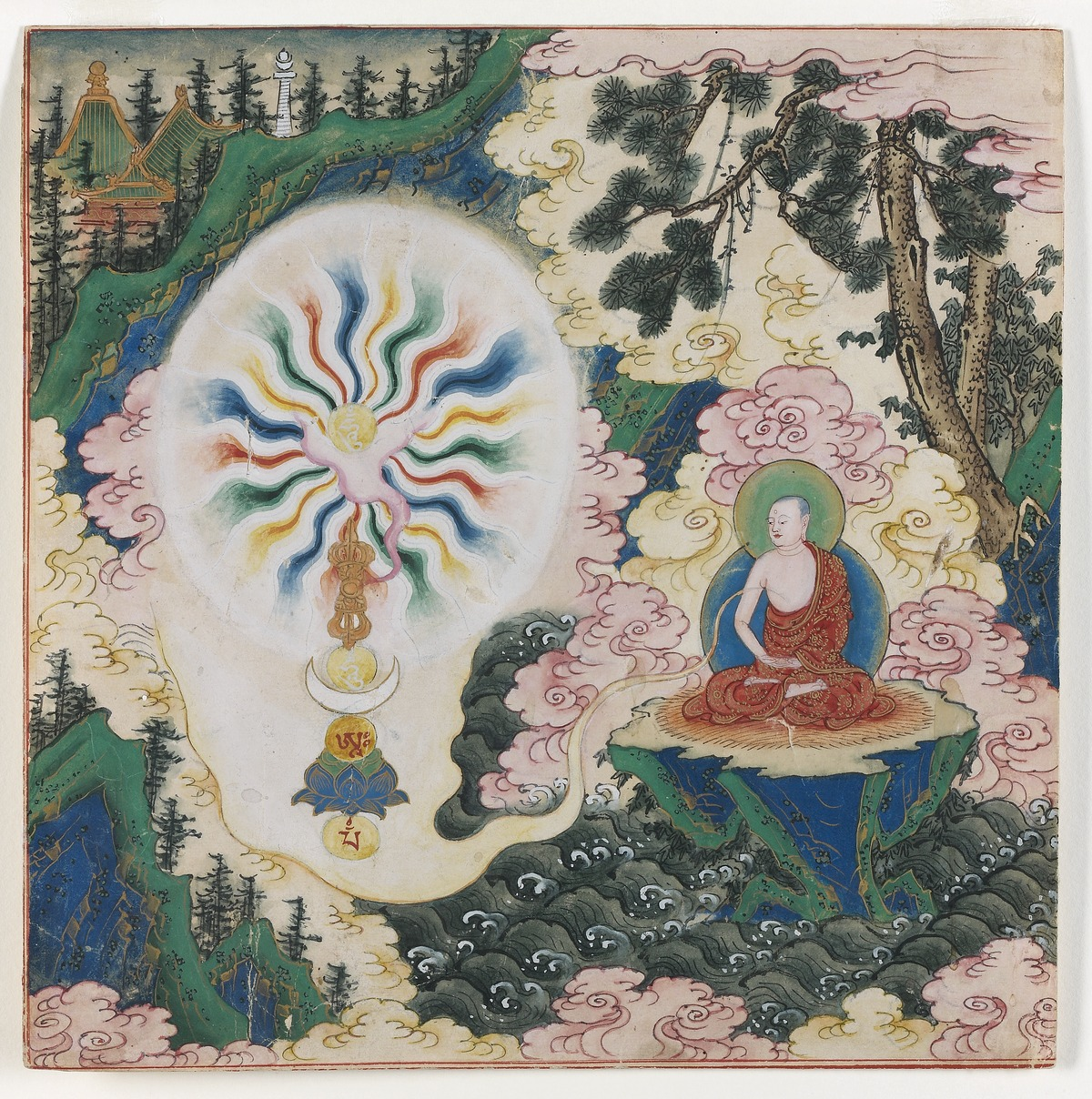
An 18th century Mongolian miniature which depicts a monk generating a tantric visualization

A Japanese depiction of the Amida Triad in Seed Syllable form (Siddham Script). Visualizing deities in the form of seed syllables is a common Vajrayana meditation. In Shingon, one of the most common practices is Ajikan (阿字觀), meditating on the syllable A.

The fundamental practice of Buddhist Tantra is "deity yoga" (devatayoga), meditation on a chosen deity or "cherished divinity" (Skt. Iṣṭa-devatā, Tib. yidam), which involves the recitation of mantras and prayers and visualization of the deity, the associated mandala of the deity's Buddha field, along with consorts and attendant Buddhas and bodhisattvas. According to the Tibetan scholar Tsongkhapa, deity yoga separates Tantra from Sutra practice.

In the Unsurpassed Yoga Tantras, the most widespread tantric form in Indo-Tibetan Buddhism, this method is divided into two stages, generation (utpatti-krama) and completion (nispanna-krama). In the generation stage, one dissolves one's reality into emptiness and meditates on the deity-mandala, resulting in identification with this divine reality. During deity visualization, the deity is to be imagined as not solid or tangible, as "empty yet apparent", with the character of a mirage or a rainbow.

This visualization is to be combined with "divine pride", which is "the thought that one is oneself the deity being visualized." Divine pride is different from common pride because it is based on compassion for others and an understanding of emptiness. The divine image along with the illusory body is then dissolved into luminous emptiness. This dissolution into emptiness is then followed by the visualization of the deity and the yogi's re-emergence as the deity. This practice is repeated over a number of daily sessions. The practitioner proceeds to the completion state after completing a requisite number of mantra repetitions, either defined in the text or given by the empowering lama.

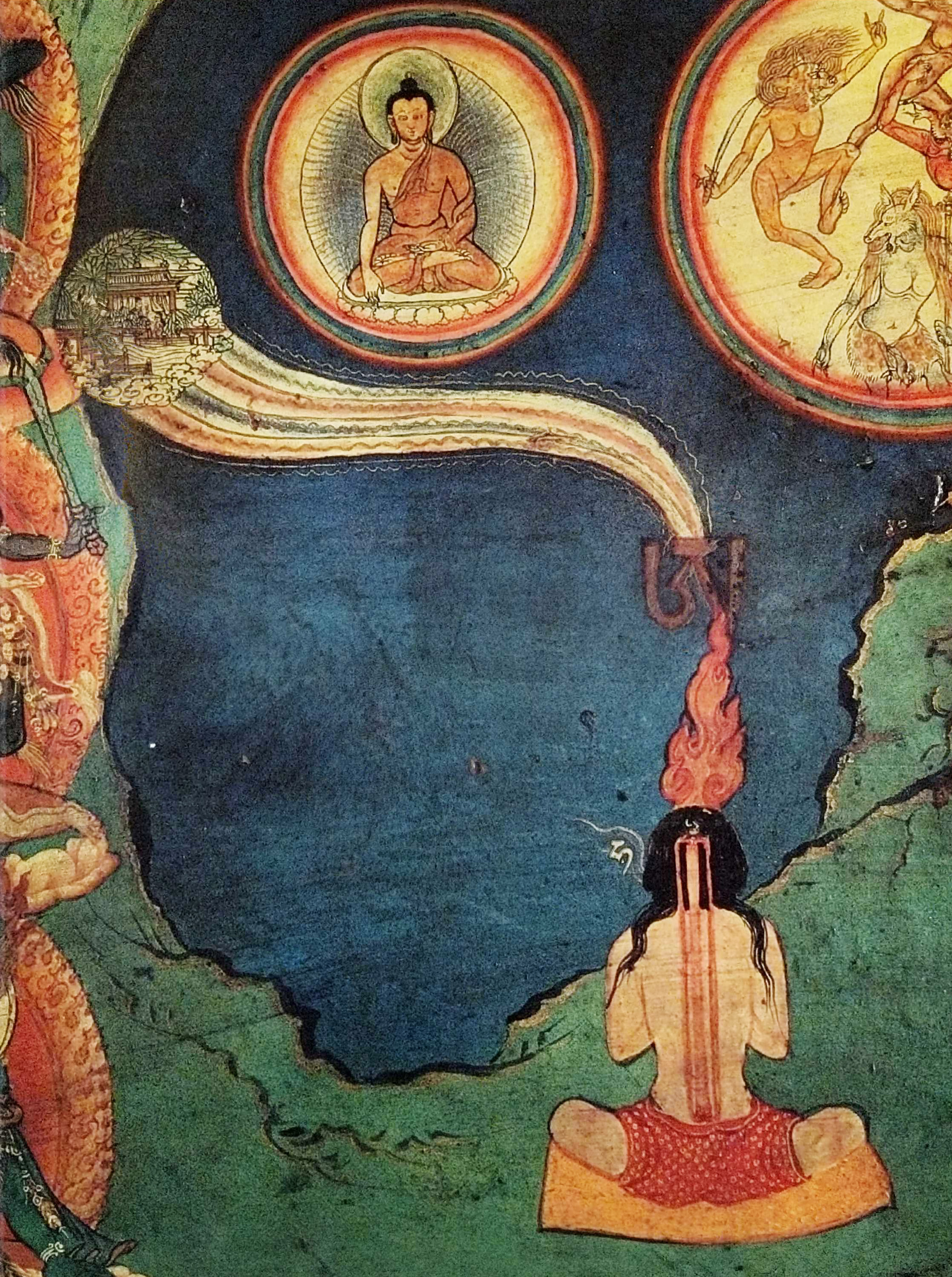
A Tibetan depiction of the perfection stage practices of tummo (Skt. candali, inner heat) and phowa (transference of consciousness)

The Tibetologist David Germano outlines two main types of completion practice: a formless and image-less contemplation on the ultimate empty nature of the mind and various yogas that make use of the illusory body to produce energetic sensations of bliss and warmth. The illusory body yogas systems like the Six Dharmas of Naropa and the Six Yogas of Kalachakra make use of energetic schemas of human psycho-physiology composed of "energy channels" (Skt. nadi, Tib. rtsa), "winds" or currents (Skt. vayu, Tib. rlung), "drops" or charged particles (Skt. bindu, Tib. thig le), and chakras ("wheels"). These subtle energies are seen as "mounts" for consciousness, the physical component of awareness. They are engaged by various means such as pranayama (breath control) to produce blissful experiences that are then applied to the realization of ultimate reality.

Other methods associated with the completion stage in Tibetan Buddhism include dream yoga (which relies on lucid dreaming), practices associated with the bardo (the interim state between death and rebirth), transference of consciousness (phowa), and Chöd, in which the yogi ceremonially offers their body to be eaten by tantric deities in a ritual feast.

=== Other practices ===
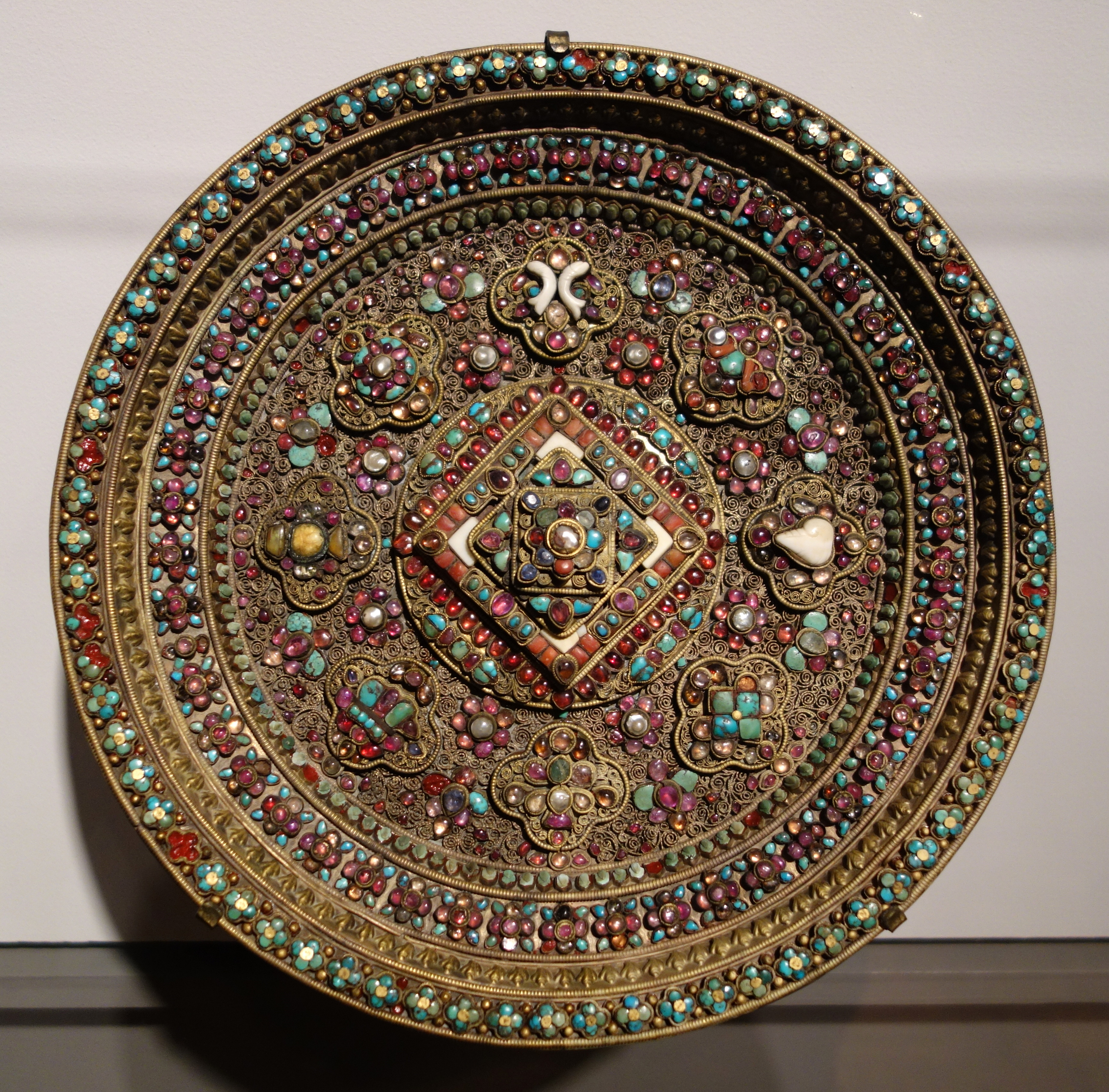
A Newari Buddhist mandala used for Guru Puja, Nepal, 19th century, gilt copper inlaid with semiprecious stones

Video of a Shingon Goma Fire Ritual at Yakuōin Yūkiji, Mount Takao

Another form of Vajrayana practice are certain meditative techniques associated with Mahāmudrā and Dzogchen, often termed "formless practices" or the path of self-liberation. These techniques do not rely on deity visualization per se but on direct pointing-out instruction from a master, and are often seen as the most advanced and direct methods.

Another distinctive feature of Tantric Buddhism is its unique and often elaborate rituals. They include pujas (worship rituals), prayer festivals, protection rituals, death rituals, tantric feasts (ganachakra), tantric initiations (abhiseka) and the goma fire ritual (common in East Asian Esotericism).

A video of the Cham dance, a traditional practice in some sects of Tibetan Buddhism

An important element in some of these rituals (particularly initiations and tantric feasts) seems to have been the practice of ritual sex or sexual yoga (karmamudra, "desire seal", also called "consort observance", vidyavrata, and euphemistically as "puja"), as well as the sacramental ingestion of "power substances" such as the mingled sexual fluids and uterine blood (often performed by licking these substances off the vulva, a practice termed yonipuja).

The practice of ingestion of sexual fluids is mentioned by numerous tantric commentators, sometimes euphemistically referring to the penis as the "vajra" and the vagina as the "lotus". The Cakrasamvara Tantra commentator Kambala, writing about this practice, states:

The seats are well-known on earth to be spots within the lotus mandala; by abiding within it there is great bliss, the royal nature of nondual joy. Therefore the lotus seat is supreme: filled with a mixture of semen and uterine blood, one should especially kiss it, and lolling with the tongue take it up. Unite the vajra and lotus, with the rapture of drinking [this] liquor.

According to David Gray, these sexual practices probably originated in a non-monastic context and were later adopted by monastic establishments (such as Nalanda and Vikramashila). He notes that the anxiety of figures like Atisa about these practices, and the stories of Virūpa and Maitripa being expelled from their monasteries for performing them, shows that supposedly celibate monastics were undertaking these sexual rites.

Because of its adoption by the monastic tradition, sexual yoga slowly became either done with an imaginary consort visualized by the yogi instead of an actual person, or reserved to a small group of the "highest" or elite practitioners. Likewise, the drinking of sexual fluids was also reinterpreted by later commentators to refer to illusory body anatomy of the perfection stage practices.

== Symbols and imagery ==
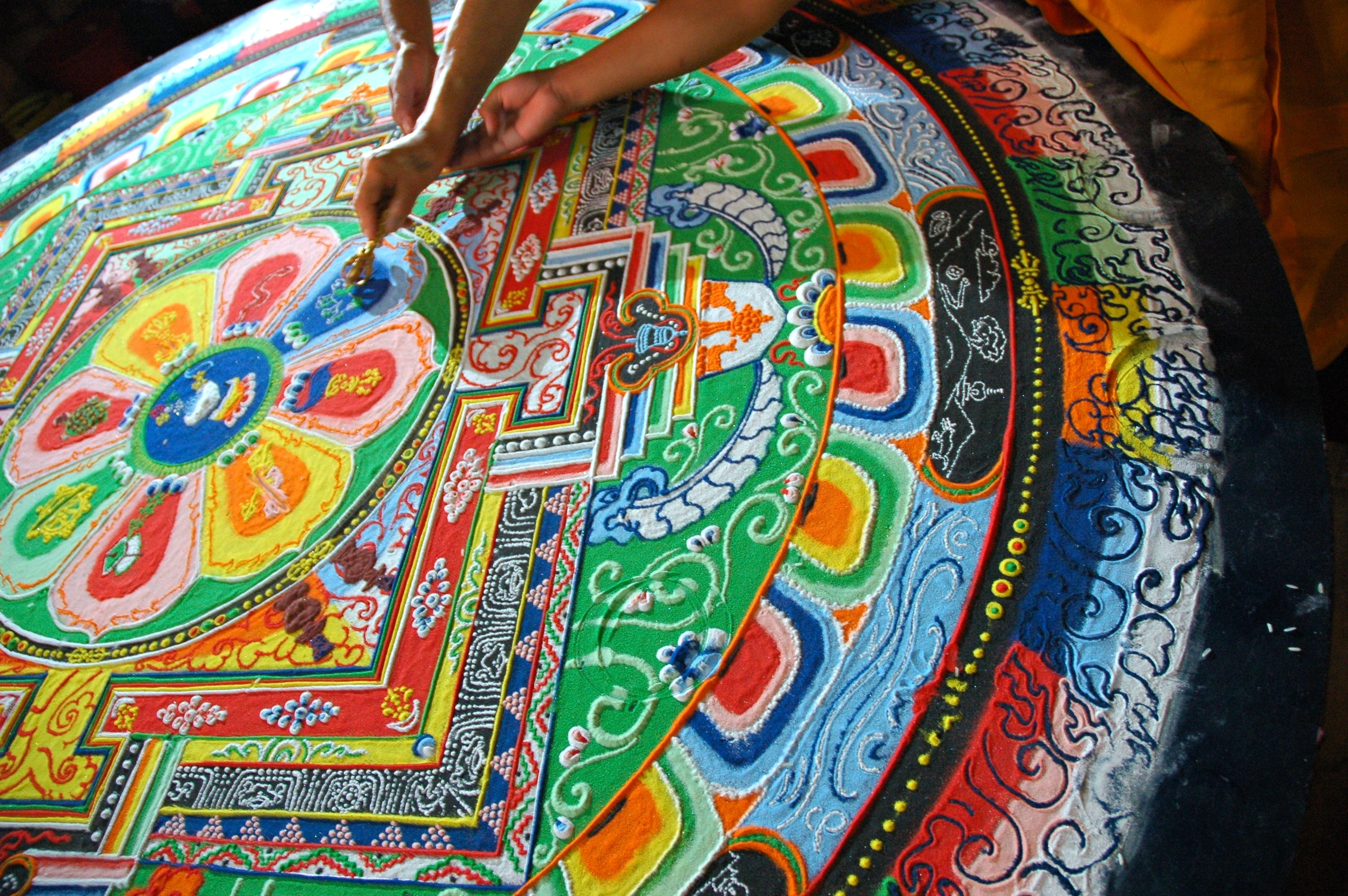
Dagchen Rinpoche's hand holds a vajra drawing lines that close the Hevajra Mandala, after the empowerment, Tharlam Monastery of Tibetan Buddhism, Boudha, Kathmandu, Nepal.

Vajrayāna uses a rich variety of symbols, terms, and images that have multiple meanings according to a complex system of analogical thinking. In Vajrayāna, symbols, and terms are multi-valent, reflecting the microcosm and the macrocosm as in the phrase "As without, so within" (yatha bahyam tatha ’dhyatmam iti) from Abhayakaragupta's Nispannayogavali.

=== The vajra ===
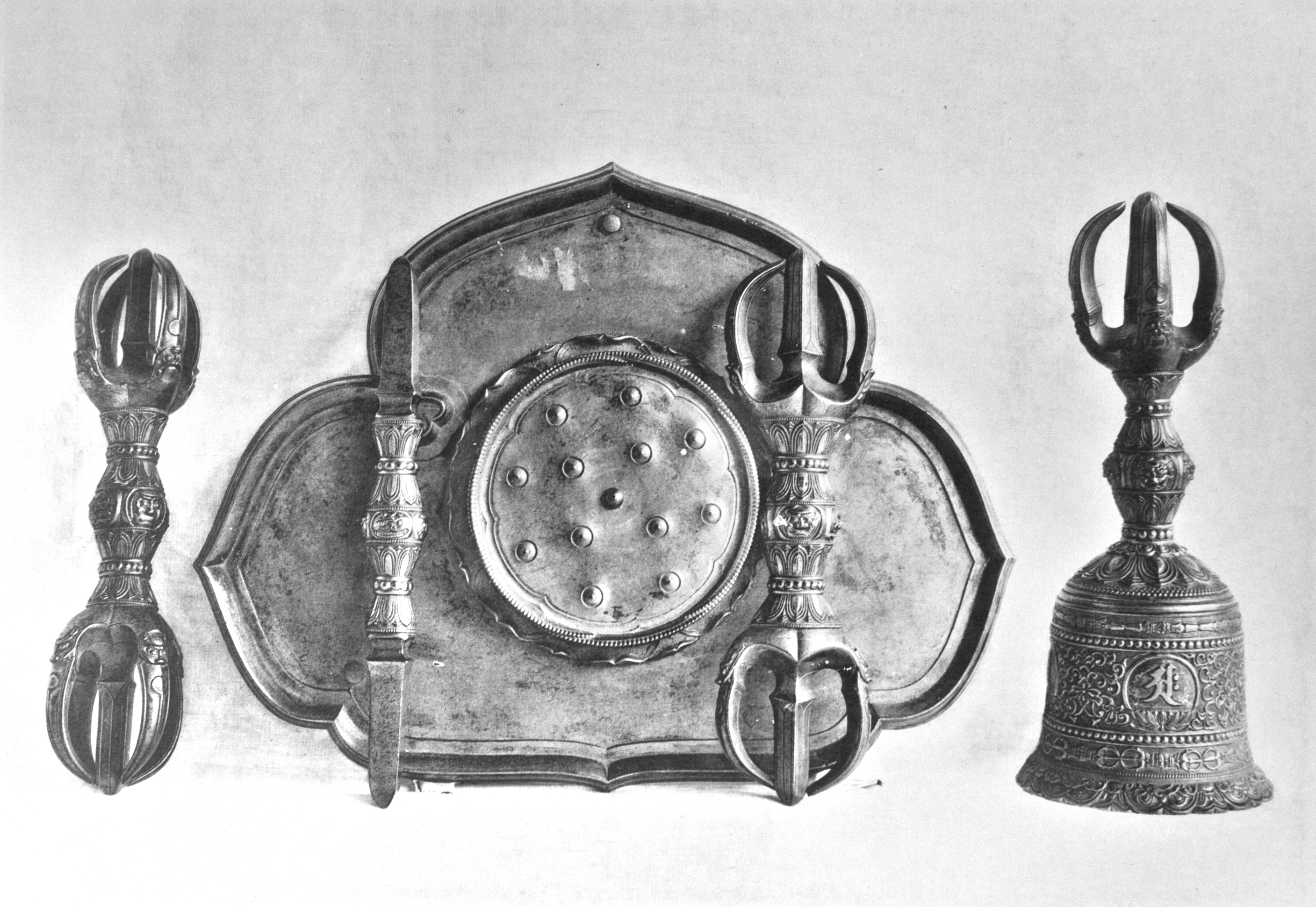
Bronze vajras and bell from Itsukushima, Japan

The Sanskrit term "vajra" denoted a thunderbolt like a legendary weapon and divine attribute that was made from an adamantine, or an indestructible substance which could, therefore, pierce and penetrate any obstacle or obfuscation. It is the weapon of choice of Indra, the King of the Devas. As a secondary meaning, "vajra" symbolizes the ultimate nature of things which is described in the tantras as translucent, pure and radiant, but also indestructible and indivisible. It is also symbolic of the power of tantric methods to achieve its goals.

A vajra is also a scepter-like ritual object (Standard Tibetan: རྡོ་རྗེ་ dorje), which has a sphere (and sometimes a gankyil) at its centre, and a variable number of spokes, 3, 5 or 9 at each end (depending on the sadhana), enfolding either end of the rod. The vajra is often traditionally employed in tantric rituals in combination with the bell or ghanta; symbolically, the vajra may represent method as well as great bliss and the bell stands for wisdom, specifically the wisdom realizing emptiness. The union of the two sets of spokes at the center of the wheel is said to symbolize the unity of wisdom (prajña) and compassion (karuna) as well as the sexual union of male and female deities.

=== Imagery and ritual in deity yoga ===
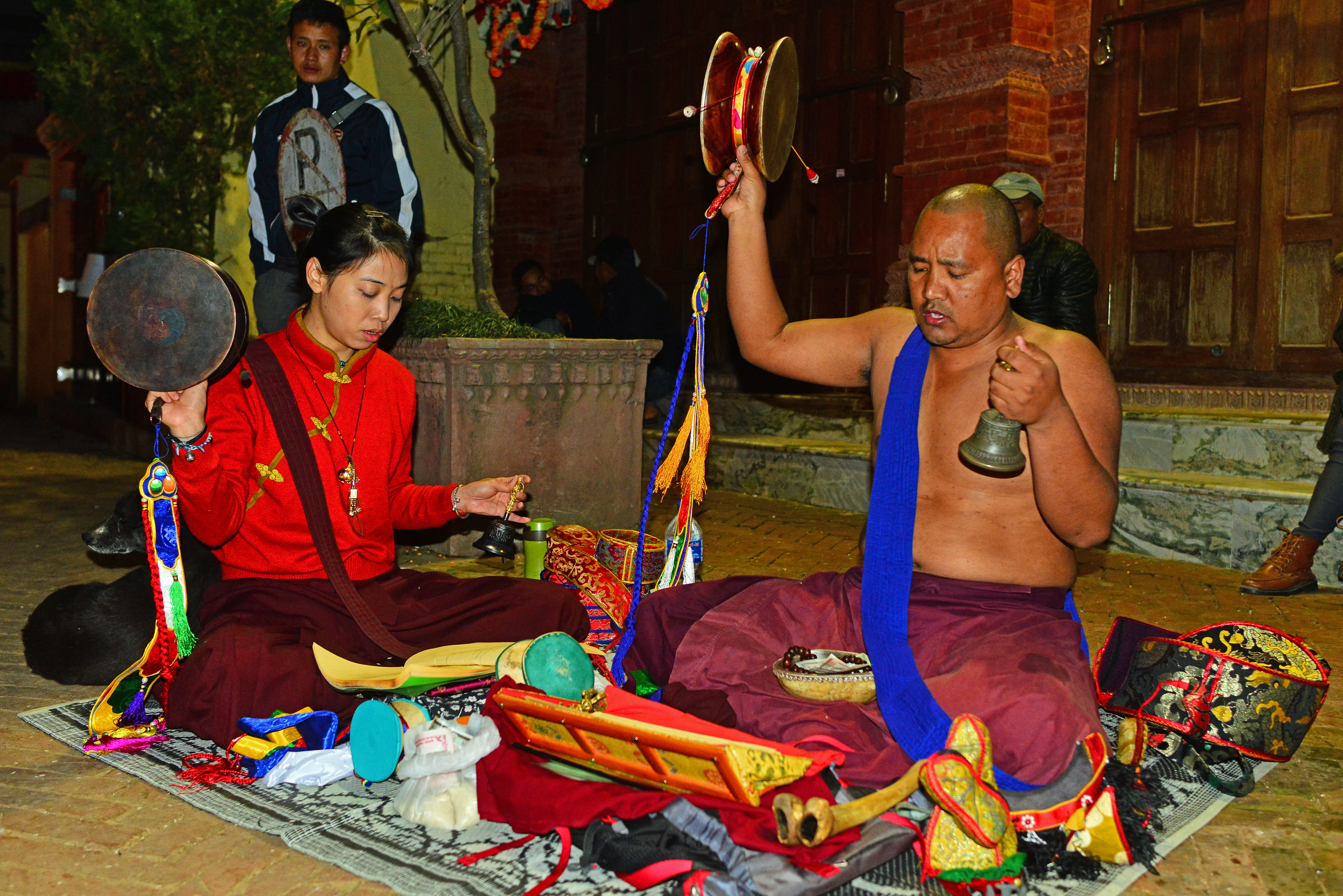
Chöd ritual, showing the use of Damaru drum and hand-bell, as well as the Kangling (thighbone trumpet)

Representations of the deity, such as statues (murti), paintings (thangka), or mandala, are often employed as an aid to visualization, in deity yoga. The use of visual aids, particularly microcosmic/macrocosmic diagrams, known as mandalas, is another unique feature of Buddhist Tantra. Mandalas are symbolic depictions of the sacred space of the awakened Buddhas and Bodhisattvas as well as of the inner workings of the human person. The macrocosmic symbolism of the mandala then, also represents the forces of the human body. The explanatory tantra of the Guhyasamaja tantra, the Vajramala, states: "The body becomes a palace, the hallowed basis of all the Buddhas."

Mandalas are also sacred enclosures, sacred architecture that house and contain the uncontainable essence of a central deity or yidam and their retinue. In the book The World of Tibetan Buddhism, the Dalai Lama describes mandalas thus: "This is the celestial mansion, the pure residence of the deity." The Five Tathagatas or 'Five Buddhas', along with the figure of the Adi-Buddha, are central to many Vajrayana mandalas as they represent the "five wisdoms", which are the five primary aspects of primordial wisdom or Buddha-nature.

All ritual in Vajrayana practice can be seen as aiding in this process of visualization and identification. The practitioner can use various hand implements such as a vajra, bell, hand-drum (damaru) or a ritual dagger (phurba), but also ritual hand gestures (mudras) can be made, special chanting techniques can be used, and in elaborate offering rituals or initiations, many more ritual implements and tools are used, each with an elaborate symbolic meaning to create a special environment for practice. Vajrayana has thus become a major inspiration in traditional Tibetan art.

== Texts ==
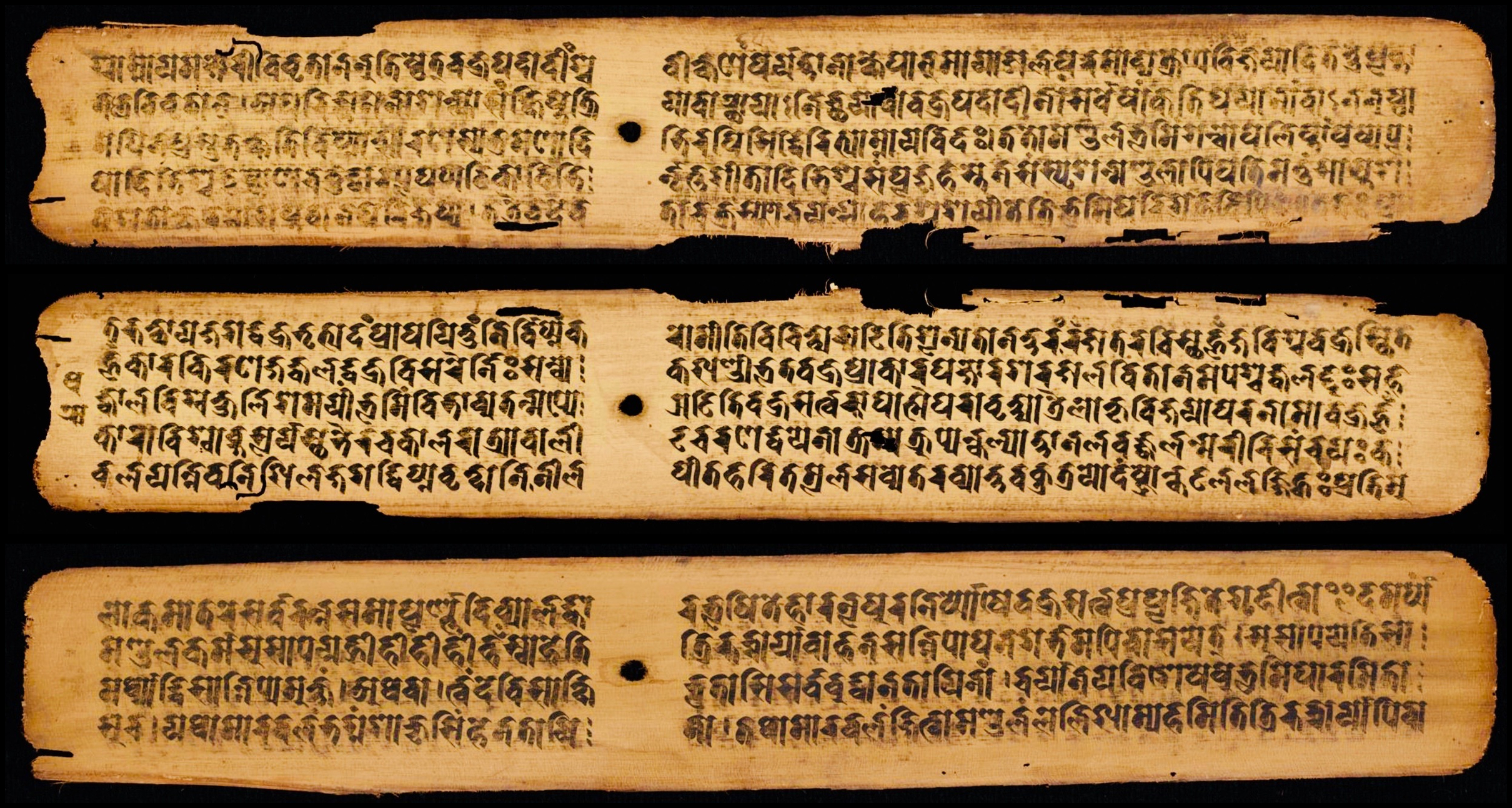
Three leaves from a manuscript of the Vajrāvalī, a ritual compendium compiled by Abhayakaragupta, abbot of the Vikramashila monastery around 1100 CE

There is an extended body of texts associated with Buddhist Tantra, including the "tantras" themselves, tantric commentaries and shastras, sadhanas (liturgical texts), ritual manuals (Chinese: 儀軌; Pinyin: Yíguǐ; Rōmaji: Giki), dharanis, poems or songs (dohas), termas and so on. According to Harunaga Isaacson,

Though we do not know precisely at present just how many Indian tantric Buddhist texts survive today in the language in which they were written, their number is certainly over one thousand five hundred; I suspect indeed over two thousand. A large part of this body of texts has also been translated into Tibetan, and a smaller part into Chinese. Aside from these, there are perhaps another two thousand or more works that are known today only from such translations. We can be certain as well that many others are lost to us forever, in whatever form. Of the texts that survive a very small proportion has been published; an almost insignificant percentage has been edited or translated reliably.

Vajrayāna texts exhibit a wide range of literary characteristics—usually a mix of verse and prose, almost always in a Sanskrit that "transgresses frequently against classical norms of grammar and usage," although also occasionally in various Middle Indic dialects or elegant classical Sanskrit.

In Chinese Mantrayana (Zhenyan), and Japanese Shingon, the most influential esoteric texts are the Mahavairocana Tantra and the Vajraśekhara Sūtra.

In Tibetan Buddhism, a large number of tantric works are widely studied and different schools focus on the study and practice of different cycles of texts. According to Geoffrey Samuel,

the Sakyapa specialize in the Hevajra Tantra, the Nyingmapa specialize in the various so called Old Tantras and terma cycles, and the most important Kagyudpa and Gelugpa tantras are Guhyasamāja, Cakrasaṃvara and Kālacakra.

=== Dunhuang manuscripts ===
The Dunhuang manuscripts also contain Tibetan Tantric manuscripts. Dalton and Schaik (2007, revised) provide an online catalogue listing 350 Tibetan Tantric Manuscripts] from Dunhuang in the Stein Collection of the British Library which is currently accessible online in discrete digitized manuscripts. With the Wylie transcription of the manuscripts, they are to be made discoverable online in the future.

== Traditions ==
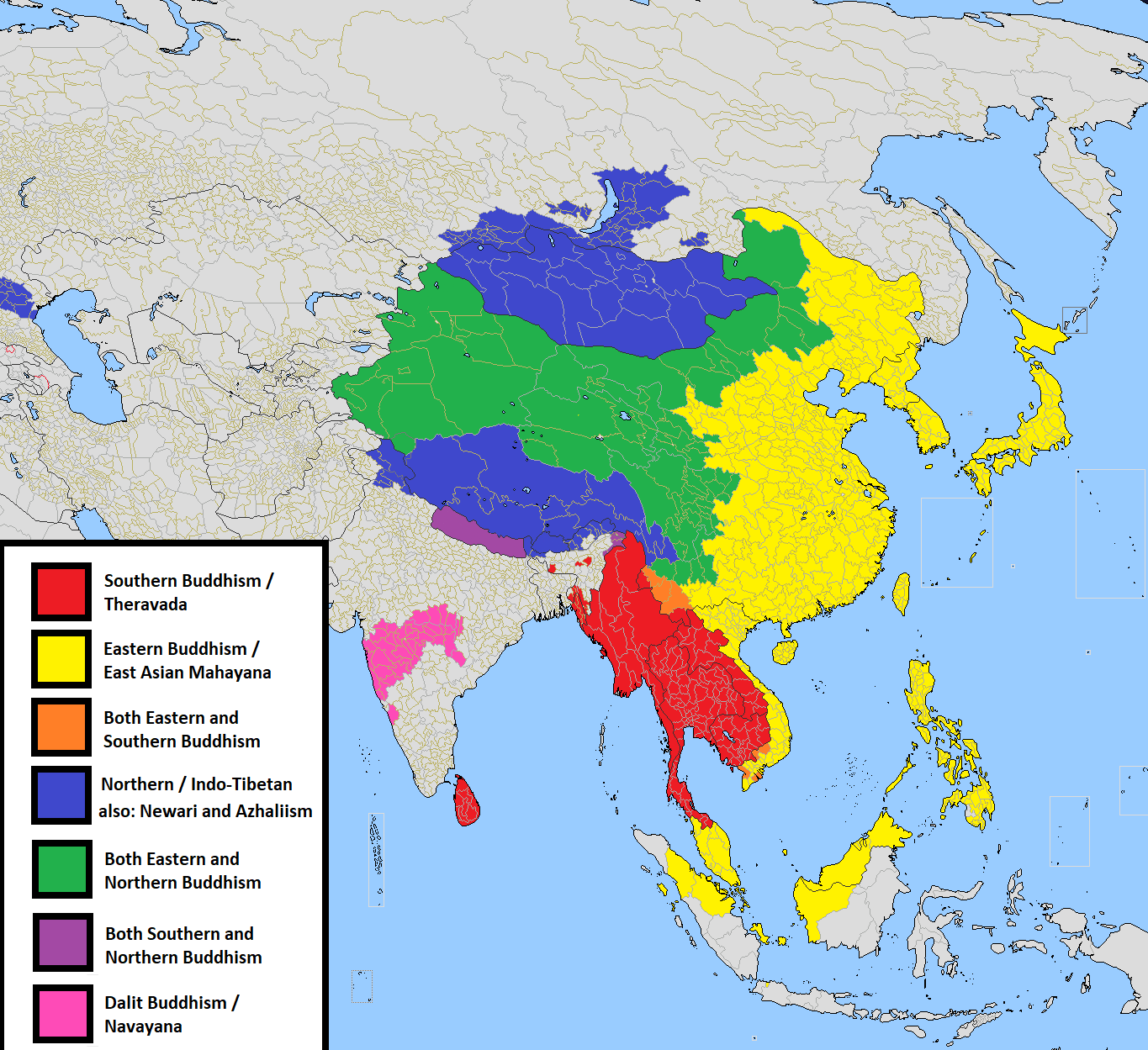
Map showing the dominant Buddhist tradition throughout Asia. Vajrayana (in the form of Tibetan Buddhism) dominates the Himalayan regions and in the Mongolian regions.

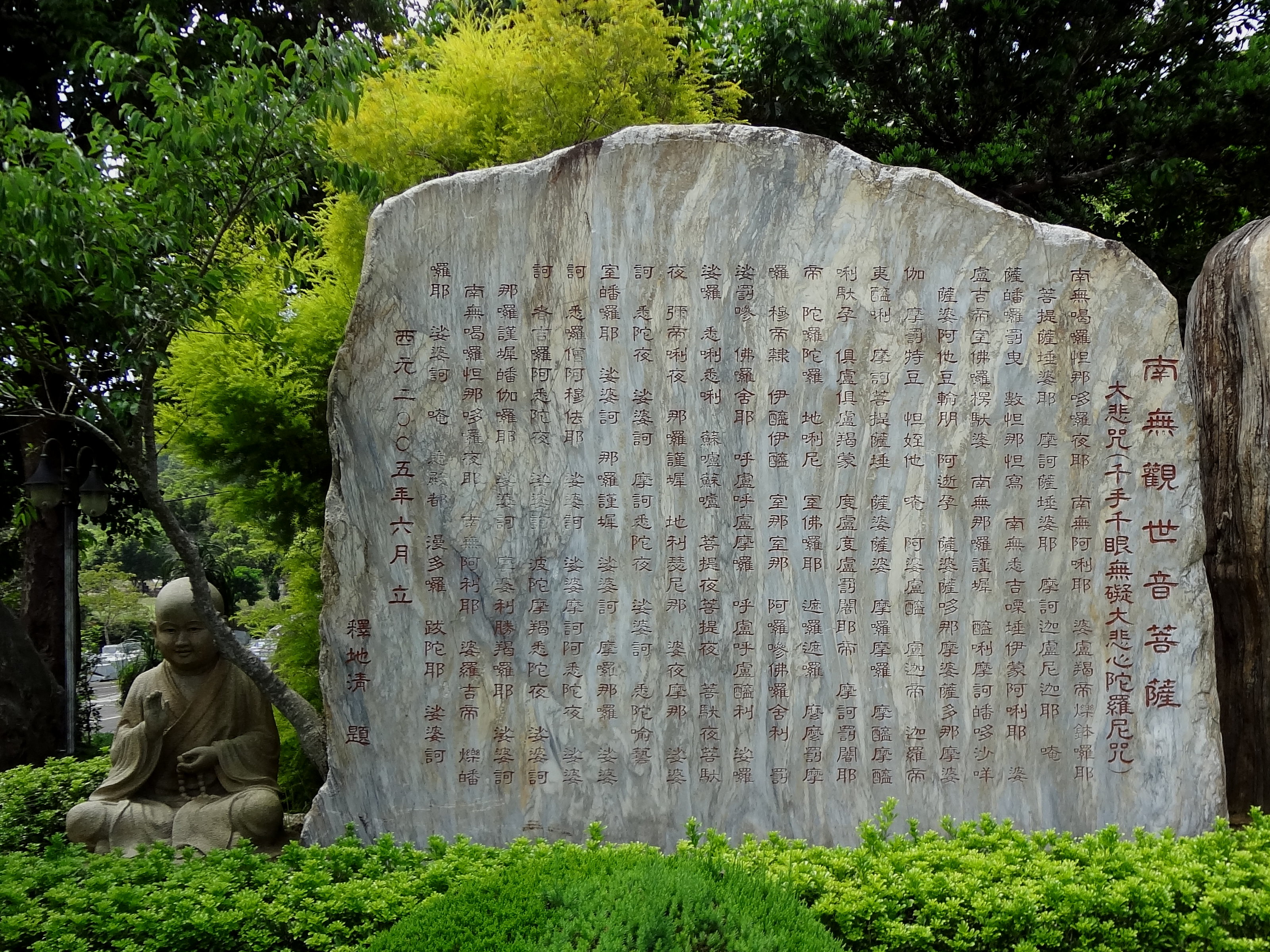
The Nīlakaṇṭha Dhāraṇī engraved on a stele. Temple Fo Ding Shan Chao Sheng in Sanyi Township, Taiwan. Erected in June 2005.

Although there is historical evidence for Vajrayāna Buddhism in Southeast Asia and elsewhere (see History of Vajrayāna above), today Vajrayāna exists primarily in the form of the two major traditions of Indo-Tibetan Buddhism (in Tibet and other parts of the PRC, Bhutan, India and also internationally) and Japanese Esoteric Buddhism (mostly in Japan), which is found in the Shingon (literally "True Speech", i.e. mantra) and Tendai schools.

Other traditions like contemporary Chinese Buddhism, Japanese Zen, Korean Buddhism, and Vietnamese Buddhism also make use of esoteric (Chinese: mijiao, Japanese: mikkyo) or mantrayana methods to a lesser extent. In many Asian Mahāyāna Buddhist traditions, esoteric methods are used as a complement, not as the central practice. This mainly involves the recitation of mantras (like the ten small mantras) and various popular dharanis. However, certain revival movements have attempted to establish new esoteric schools in mainland East Asia such as Mantra School Bright Lineage (in China) and the South Korean Jingak Order.

There was strong connection between the Palas in Bengal, Srivijaya in Nusantara, and the kingdoms in East Asia through the sea route. Medieval monks were a prime factor in the spread of esoteric Buddhism.

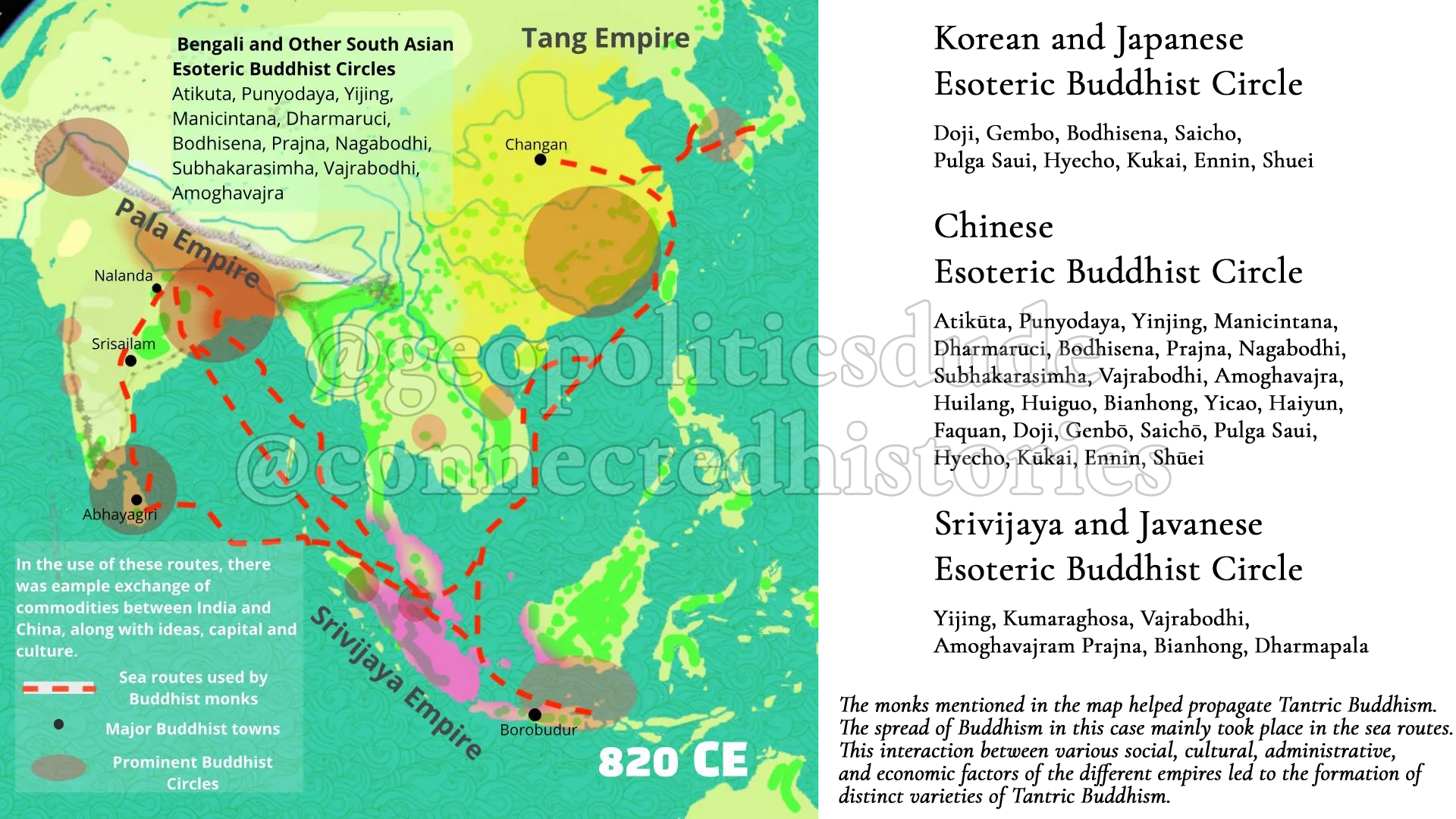
A map depicting the spread of Esoteric Buddhism in Southeast and Eastern Eurasia

The distinction between mantrayana traditions is not always rigid. For example, the tantra sections of the Tibetan Buddhist canon of texts sometimes include material not usually thought of as tantric outside the Tibetan Buddhist tradition, such as the widely recited Heart Sutra and even versions of some material found in the Pali Canon. (Note: Skilling 1998, p. 78, speaks of the tantra divisions of some editions of the Kangyur as including Sravakayana, Mahayana and Vajrayana texts.)

=== Chinese Esoteric Buddhism ===
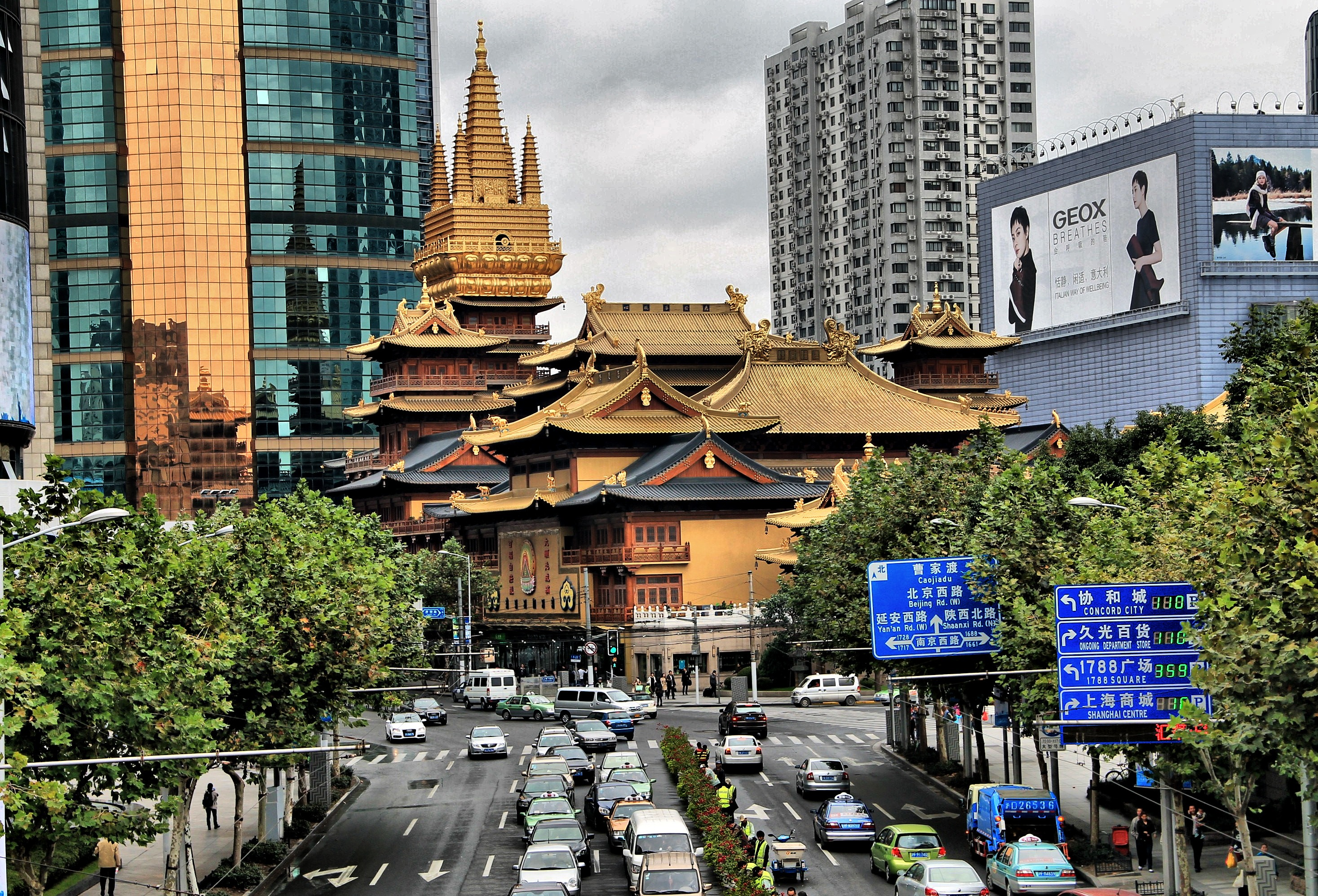
The Jing'an Temple in Shanghai, China, which Chisong promoted the Chinese Zhenyan (Mantrayana) tradition.

Esoteric and Tantric teachings followed the same route into northern China as Buddhism itself, arriving via the Silk Road and Southeast Asian Maritime trade routes sometime during the first half of the 7th century, during the Tang dynasty and received sanction from the emperors of the Tang dynasty. During this time, three great masters came from India to China: Śubhakarasiṃha, Vajrabodhi, and Amoghavajra who translated key texts and founded the Zhenyan (真言, "true word", "mantra") tradition.

Zhenyan was also brought to Japan as Shingon during this period. This tradition focused on tantras like the Mahavairocana tantra, and unlike Tibetan Buddhism, it does not employ the antinomian and radical tantrism of the Anuttarayoga Tantras. The prestige of this tradition eventually influenced other schools of Chinese Buddhism such as Chan and Tiantai to adopt various esoteric practices over time, leading to a merging of teachings between the various schools. During the Yuan dynasty, the Mongol emperors made Tibetan Buddhism the official religion of China, and Tibetan lamas were given patronage at the court. Imperial support of Tibetan Vajrayana continued into the Ming and Qing dynasties.

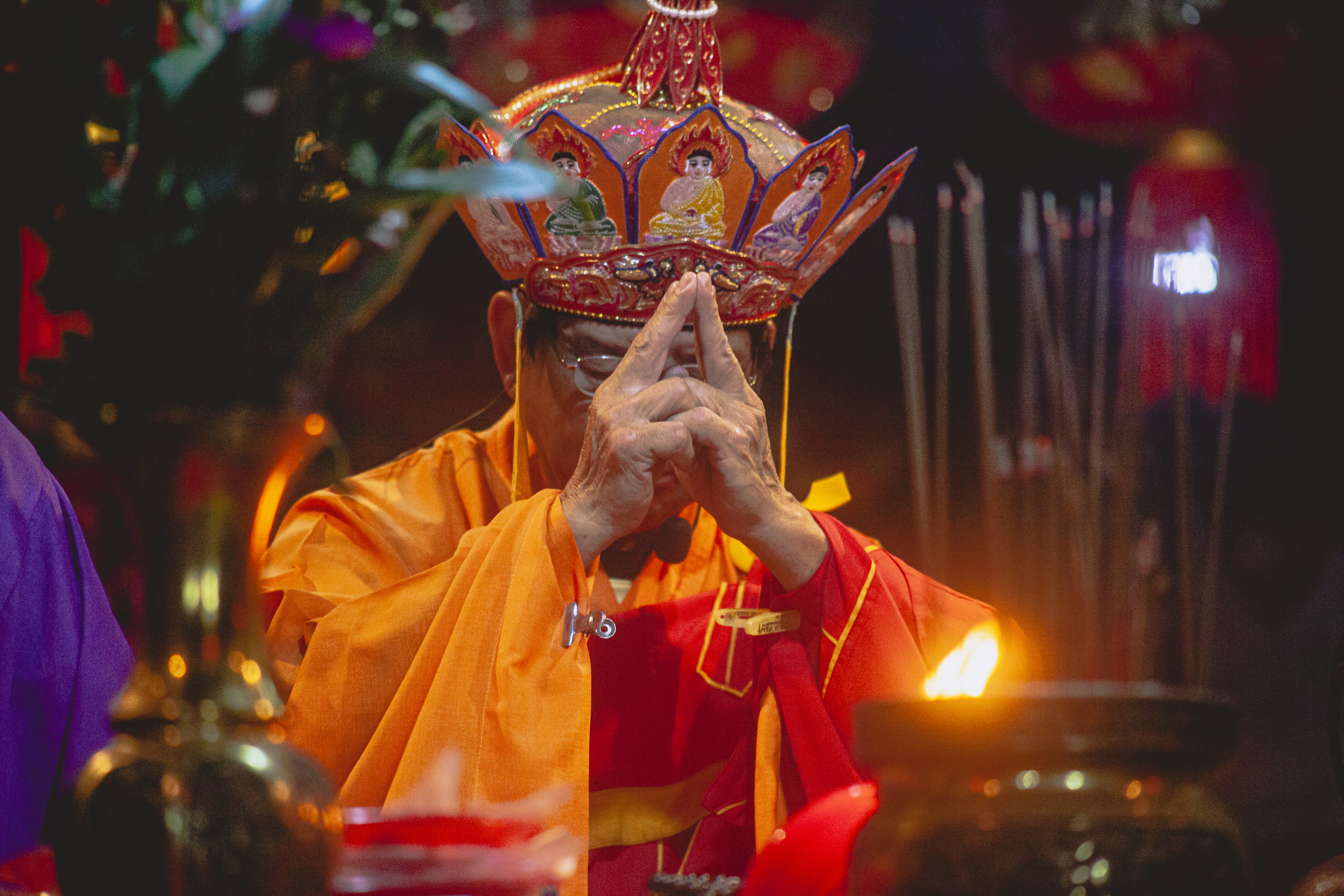
The vajrācārya of a Yujia Yankou ritual performing a mudrā while wearing a Five Buddha crown adorned with images of the Five Tathāgatas

Today, esoteric traditions are deeply embedded in mainstream Chinese Buddhism and expressed through various rituals which make use of tantric mantra and dhāraṇī and the veneration of certain tantric deities like Cundi and Acala. One example of esoteric teachings still practiced in many Chinese Buddhist monasteries is the Śūraṅgama Sūtra and the dhāraṇī revealed within it, the Śūraṅgama Mantra, which are especially influential in the Chinese Chan tradition. Another example is the popular tantric Yujia Yankou ritual, where monastics take on the role of a vajrācārya and performs deity yoga through the usage of mantras, mudrās and maṇḍala offerings in order to help facilitate the nourishment and ultimate liberation of all sentient beings. In particular, the usage of mantras, mudrās and maṇḍalas in the ritual correspond directly to the concept of the "Three Mysteries" (Chinese: 三密; pinyin: Sānmì) in tantric Buddhism: the "secrets" of body, speech and mind. This ritual is commonly performed during or at the end of regular religious temple events such as repentance rites, Buddha recitation retreats, the dedication of a new monastic complex or gatherings for the transmission of monastic vows. It is also widely performed as a post-mortem rite within Chinese society during funerals and other related occasions such as the Ghost Festival. A related ritual that also involves esoteric practices is the extensive Shuilu Fahui ceremony, which involves setting up maṇḍalas of esoteric deities such as the Ten Wisdom Kings as well as the invocation of those deities to the ritual space via mantras, mudrās and visualization.

A recent development is known as the "esoteric Buddhism revival movement" (mijiao fuxing yundong 密教復興運動) which involved the revival of Chinese esoteric Buddhism by Chinese students of Japanese Shingon. Some important figures of this revival include Chisong 持松 (1894-1972), Dayong 大勇 (1893-1929), Li Yizhen 黎乙真 (1872-1937), Wang Hongyuan 王弘願 (1876–1937), and Wuguang 悟光 (1918–2000), both trained in Shingon and went on to spread Shingon teachings in the Chinese speaking world. These revivalist lineages exist in mainland China, Hong Kong, Taiwan and Malaysia. Though they draw mainly from Shingon teachings, they have also adopted some Tibetan Buddhist elements—such as the case with Dayong who pursued Shingon in Japan then Tibetan buddhism.

Another form of esoteric Buddhism in China is the related but unique tradition of Azhaliism, which is practiced among the Bai people of China and venerates Mahakala as a major deity.

=== Japanese esotericism ===
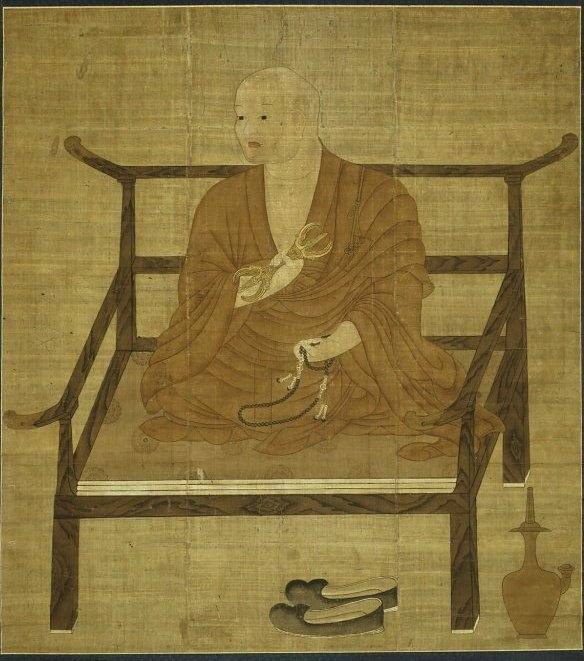
Portrait of Kobo Daishi (Kukai) holding a vajra and a mala, 14th century, Art Institute of Chicago

==== Shingon Buddhism ====
The Shingon school is found in Japan and includes practices, known in Japan as Mikkyō ("Esoteric (or Mystery) Teaching"), which are similar in concept to those in Vajrayana Buddhism. The lineage for Shingon Buddhism differs from that of Tibetan Vajrayana, having emerged from India during the 9th–11th centuries in the Pala Dynasty and Central Asia (via China) and is based on earlier versions of the Indian texts than the Tibetan lineage. Shingon shares material with Tibetan Buddhism – such as the esoteric sutras (called Tantras in Tibetan Buddhism) and mandalas – but the actual practices are not related.

The primary texts of Shingon Buddhism are the Mahavairocana Sutra and Vajrasekhara Sutra. The founder of Shingon Buddhism was Kukai, a Japanese monk who studied in China in the 9th century during the Tang dynasty and brought back Vajrayana scriptures, techniques and mandalas then popular in China. The school was merged into other schools in China towards the end of the Tang dynasty but was sectarian in Japan. Shingon is one of the few remaining branches of Buddhism in the world that continues to use the siddham script of the Sanskrit language.

==== Tendai Buddhism ====
Although the Tendai school in China and Japan does employ some esoteric practices, these rituals came to be considered of equal importance with the exoteric teachings of the Lotus Sutra. By chanting mantras, maintaining mudras, or practicing certain forms of meditation, Tendai maintains that one is able to understand sense experiences as taught by the Buddha, have faith that one is innately an enlightened being, and that one can attain enlightenment within the current lifetime.

=== Korean milgyo ===
Esoteric Buddhist practices (known as milgyo, 密教) and texts arrived in Korea during the introduction of Buddhism to the region in 372 CE. Esoteric Buddhism was supported by the royalty of both Unified Silla (668–935) and Goryeo Dynasty (918–1392). During the Goryeo Dynasty esoteric practices were common within large sects like the Seon school and the Hwaeom school as well as smaller esoteric sects like the Sinin (mudra) and Ch'ongji (Dharani) schools. During the era of the Mongol occupation (1251–1350s), Tibetan Buddhism also existed in Korea, though it never gained a foothold there.

During the Joseon dynasty, Esoteric Buddhist schools were forced to merge with the Seon and Kyo schools, becoming the ritual specialists. With the decline of Buddhism in Korea, Esoteric Buddhism mostly died out, save for a few traces in the rituals of the Jogye Order and Taego Order.

There are now five esoteric Buddhist schools in South Korea: Jingak Order, Jineon Order, Chongji Order, Jisong Order, and Cheonhwa Buddhism. According to Henrik H. Sørensen, the Jineon and Jingak Orders "have absolutely no historical link with the Korean Buddhist tradition per se but are late constructs based in large measures on Japanese Shingon Buddhism."

=== Vietnamese Buddhist esotericism ===
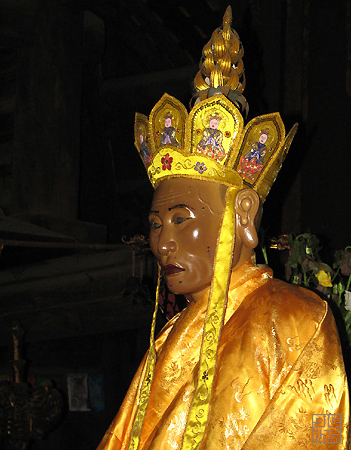
Statue of Từ Đạo Hạnh wearing an esoteric Five Tathāgatas Crown in the Thầy Temple near Hanoi.

Vietnamese Buddhist esotericism is known as Mật giáo or Mật Tông and is a common part of Vietnamese Mahāyāna Buddhism (along with Pure Land practice and Thien). Commonly recited esoteric texts include Uṣṇīṣavijayadhāraṇī, the Nīlakaṇṭha Dhāraṇī and the Śūraṅgama mantra. According to Quang Minh Thich "at present, it is still the norm in Vietnamese Buddhist temples, both in Vietnam and abroad, that these mantras, as elements of the Mantrayana, are recited either in their distinctive chanted sessions or in conjunction with other popular Buddhist scriptures. In function, the Vietnamese Tantric practices serve as a complement to the practices of Zen and Pure Land, not as an independent tradition."

The first Vietnamese monk we know of who studied Vajrayana was Master Van Ky (c. 7th century) who received initiation in the kingdom of Srivijaya from a certain Jñanabhadra (Tri Hien) as reported by Yijing. By the 12th century (under the Lý dynasty), esoteric Buddhism was widespread in Vietnam, and was especially favored by the Vô Ngôn Thông school as well as by the Vinitaruci school. One famous esoteric master of this period was Từ Đạo Hạnh. He brought back various texts and practices from Burma. He became famous as a powerful magician. He was fond of the Mahākaruṇika Dhāraṇī. He also spread esoteric teachings throughout Vietnam and liberalized their practice, making them less dependent on reincarnation lineages (similar to Tibetan tulkus). Another promoter of esoteric Buddhism during this period was Sùng Phạm (1004-1078) of Phap Van pagoda who studied in India for nine years before returning to Vietnam and was the teacher of the influential esoteric master Tri Bat. Phap Loa (1284-1330), a leader of the Truc Lam school, was another very influential Vietnamese esoteric master. He is known for establishing esoteric abhiseka (initiation) ceremonies as well as Huayan (Hoa Nghiêm) assemblies. He also wrote various texts on esoteric topics.

Chinese Buddhist esotericism also influenced Vietnamese esotericism during the medieval period, especially the Huayan Esotericism of Daoshen's Xianmi yuantong chengfo xinyao ji (顯密圓通成佛心要集 Collection of Essentials for the Attainment of Buddhahood by Total [Inter-]Penetration of the Esoteric and the Exoteric, T1955).

Some modern teachers and organizations focus specifically on Vietnamese esoteric Buddhism. Thích Viên Đức (1932-1980) was one important modern promoter of Esoteric Buddhism. He is known for translating a collection of Esoteric Buddhist texts, contributing to the dissemination of Esoteric Buddhism in Vietnam. Thích Viên Đức promoted esoteric Buddhist teachings as the fastest path to enlightenment. He established numerous communities in southern Vietnam and was also known as a healer. He also met with Tibetan lamas and Japanese Buddhists. Another modern Vietnamese esoteric organization is Mat Giao Friendship Association who publishes Phước Triệu's Quintessence of Esoteric Buddhism (2004). Esoteric practices are also currently associated with the Thầy Temple in Greater Hanoi. Vietnamese esotericism can also be quite syncretic, borrowing from Chinese, Japanese and Tibetan Buddhism.

=== Tibetan Buddhism ===
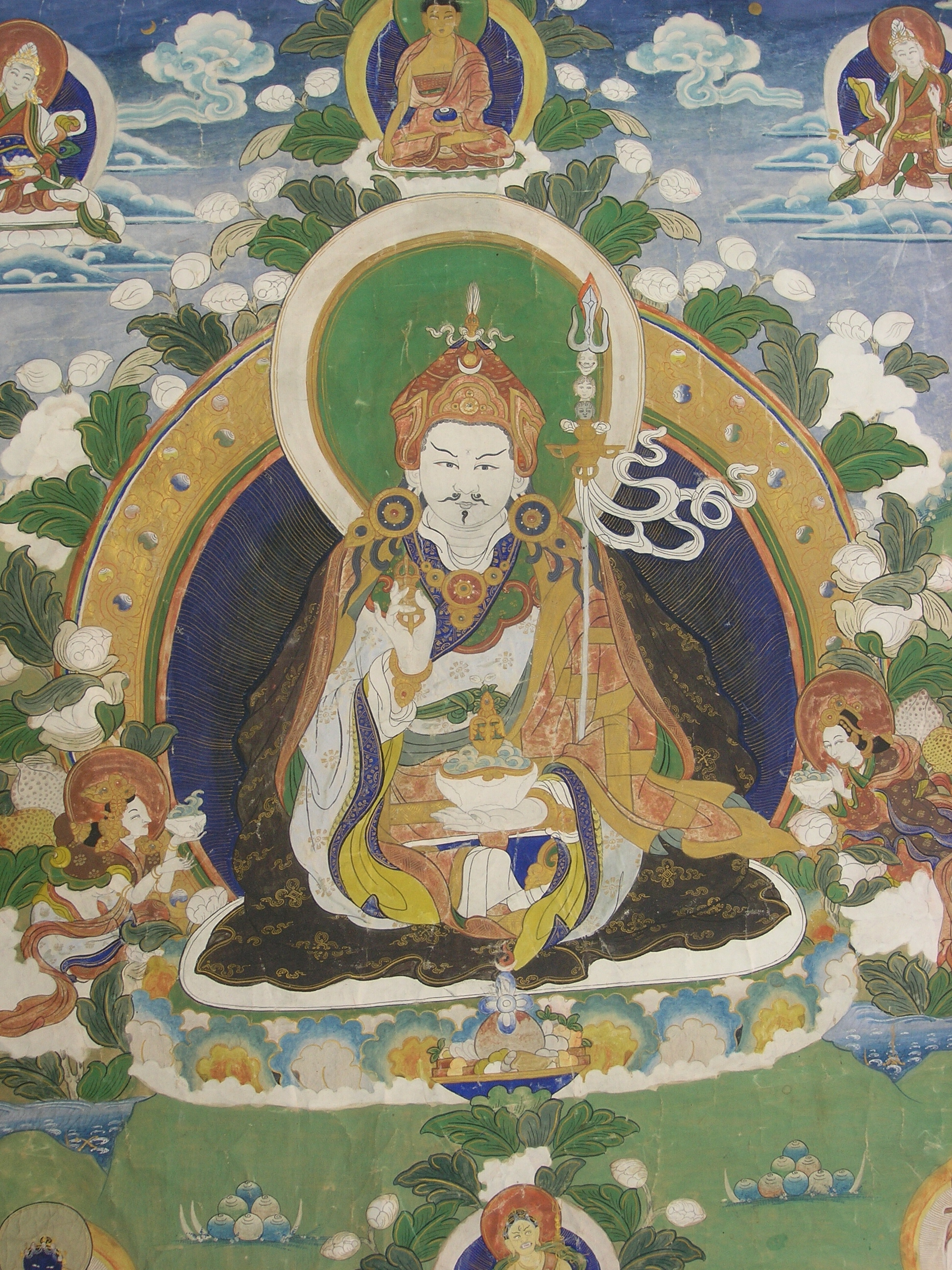
Born in the Tantric heartland of Oddiyana (identified as Swat district), Padmasambhava was an important figure in disseminating Buddhism in Tibet

Buddhism was initially established in Tibet in the 8th century when various figures like Padmasambhāva (8th century CE) and Śāntarakṣita (725–788) were invited by King Trisong Detsen, some time before 767. In contrast to its neighbours that adhered to Mahayana, Tibet adopted Vajrayana on full scale following the Samye debate, where Indian Vajrayana scholar Kamalaśīla defeated the Chan Buddhist scholar Moheyan in an Indian style debate. Tibetan Buddhism reflects the later stages tantric Indian Buddhism of the post-Gupta Early Medieval period (500 to 1200 CE).

This tradition practices and studies a set of tantric texts and commentaries associated with the more "left hand" (vamachara) tantras, which are not part of East Asian Esoteric Buddhism. These tantras (sometimes termed 'Anuttarayoga tantras' include many transgressive elements, such as sexual and mortuary symbolism that is not shared by the earlier tantras that are studied in East Asian Buddhism. These texts were translated into Classical Tibetan during the "New translation period" (10th–12th centuries). Tibetan Buddhism also includes numerous native Tibetan developments, such as the tulku system, new sadhana texts, Tibetan scholastic works, Dzogchen literature and Terma literature. There are four major traditions or schools: Nyingma, Sakya, Kagyu, and Gelug in addition to minor schools like Jonang and Rimé movement.

In the pre-modern era, Tibetan Buddhism spread outside of Tibet primarily due to the influence of the Mongol Yuan dynasty (1271–1368), founded by Kublai Khan, which ruled China, Mongolia and eastern Siberia. In the modern era it has spread outside of Asia due to the efforts of the Tibetan diaspora (1959 onwards).

The Tibetan Buddhist tradition is today found in Tibet, Bhutan, northern India, Nepal, southwestern and northern China, Mongolia and various constituent republics of Russia that are adjacent to the area, such as Amur Oblast, Buryatia, Zabaykalsky Krai, the Tuva Republic and Khabarovsk Krai. Tibetan Buddhism is also the main religion in Kalmykia. It has also spread to Western countries and there are now international networks of Tibetan Buddhist temples and meditation centers in the Western world from all four schools.

=== Bengali Buddhism ===
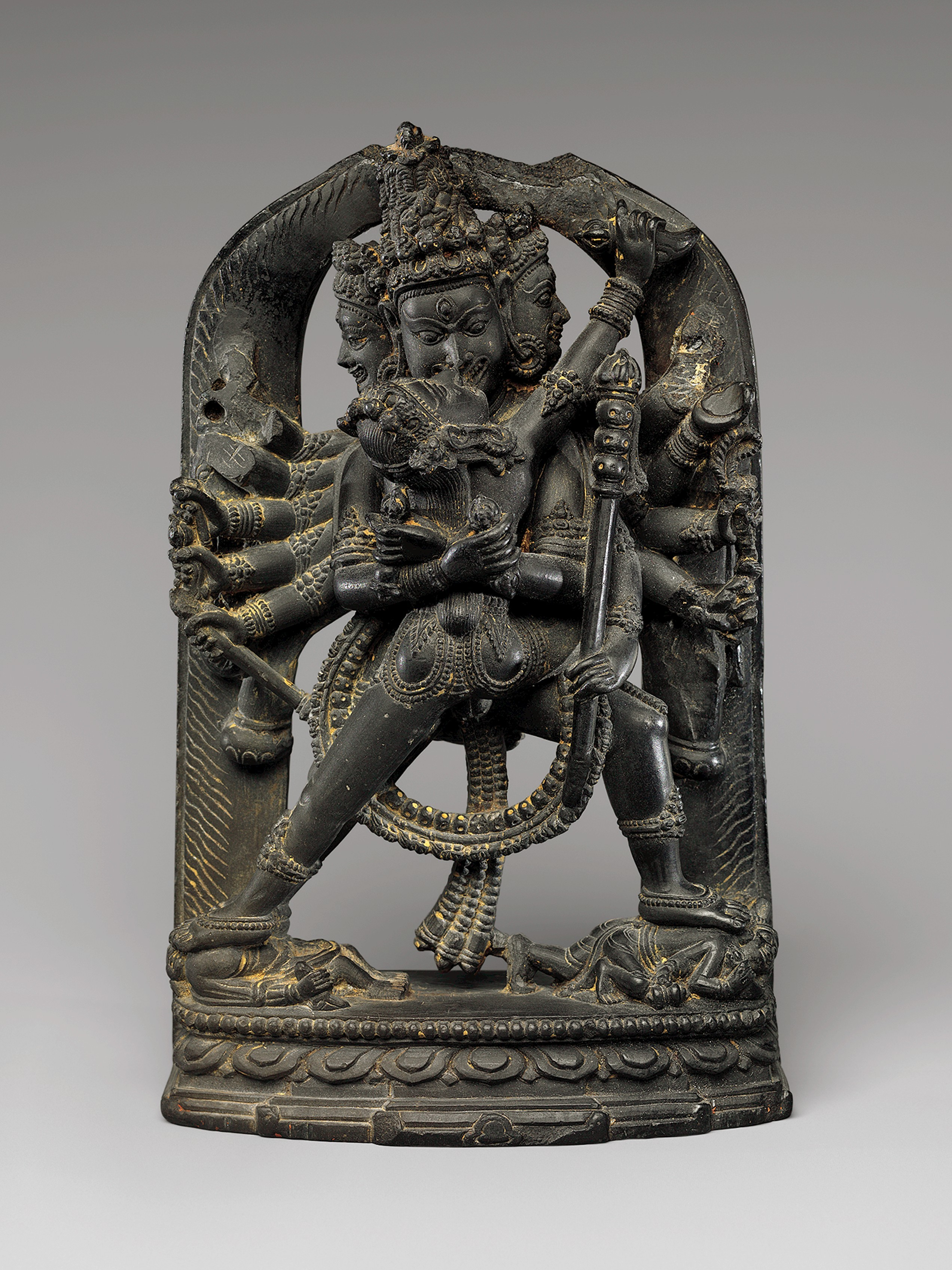
12th century stone statue of Chakrasamvara in sexual union with Vajravarahi from Bengal

Bengal was a thriving centre of Vajrayana under the patronage of the Pala dynasty. Many mahasiddhas hailed from the Eastern zone of the Indian subcontinent, with the Charyapada, a collection of songs composed by these mahasiddhas, containing early references to Vajrayana as well as being an early written record of Eastern Indic languages. Bengali Vajrayana scholar Atiśa played a vital role in revitalizing Buddhism in Tibet following its persecution by the Bon emperor Langdarma and onset of the Era of Fragmentation, leading to the foundation of the Kadam lineage. Another Bengali Vajrayana scholar Abhayakaragupta also had a profound impact on Tibetan Buddhism. However Vajrayana declined by the time the Sena dynasty came to power. Vajrayana was further affected by the Islamic conquest of India & consolidation of Muslim rule in Bengal, with many of its adherents converting to Islam under duress & later Gaudiya Vaishnavism, which lead to creation of new groups like Sahajiyas. Today Buddhism in Bengal is followed only by a small minority of Jumma people who are followers of Theravāda Buddhism.

=== Nepalese Newar Buddhism ===
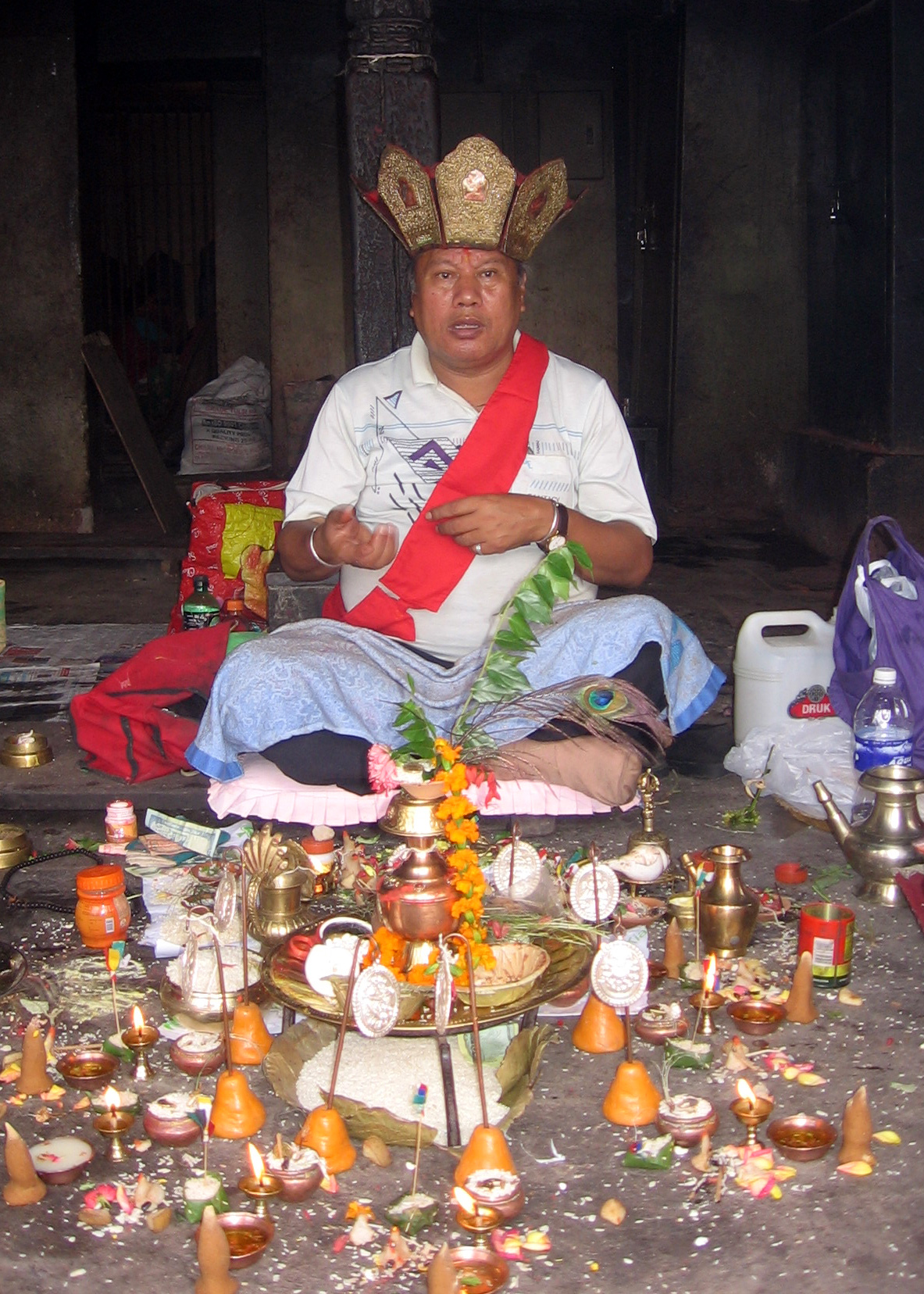
A contemporary Newar vajracharya performing rituals at Swayambhunath

Newar Buddhism is practiced by Newars in Nepal. It is the only form of Vajrayana Buddhism in which the scriptures are written in Sanskrit and this tradition has preserved many Vajrayana texts in this language. Its priests do not follow celibacy and are called vajracharya (literally "diamond-thunderbolt carriers").

=== Indonesian Esoteric Buddhism ===
Indonesian Esoteric Buddhism refers to the traditions of Esoteric Buddhism found in the Indonesian islands of Java and Sumatra before the rise and dominance of Islam in the region (13–16th centuries). The Buddhist empire of Srivijaya (650 CE–1377 CE) was a major center of Esoteric Buddhist learning which drew Chinese monks such as Yijing and Indian scholars like Atiśa. The temple complex at Borobudur in central Java, built by the Shailendra dynasty also reflects strong Tantric or at least proto-tantric influences, particularly of the cult of Vairocana.

Hevajra statue from Khmer empire, dating to the reign of Jayavarman VII

Indonesian Esoteric Buddhism may have also reached the Philippines, possibly establishing the first form of Buddhism in the Philippines. The few Buddhist artifacts that have been found in the islands reflect the iconography of Srivijaya's Vajrayana.

== Related traditions ==
Some traditions are related to Vajrayana, but are not to be seen as "Vajrayana" or "Mantrayana" proper. Vajrayana here referring to the Buddhist tradition based on the tantric literature of North Indian Mahāyāna, the Buddhist tantras and the works of the Nalanda - Vikramashila masters and the Buddhist mahasiddhas. However, these related traditions may have been influenced by Vajrayana proper and have borrowed practices from Vajrayana schools.

=== Shugendō ===
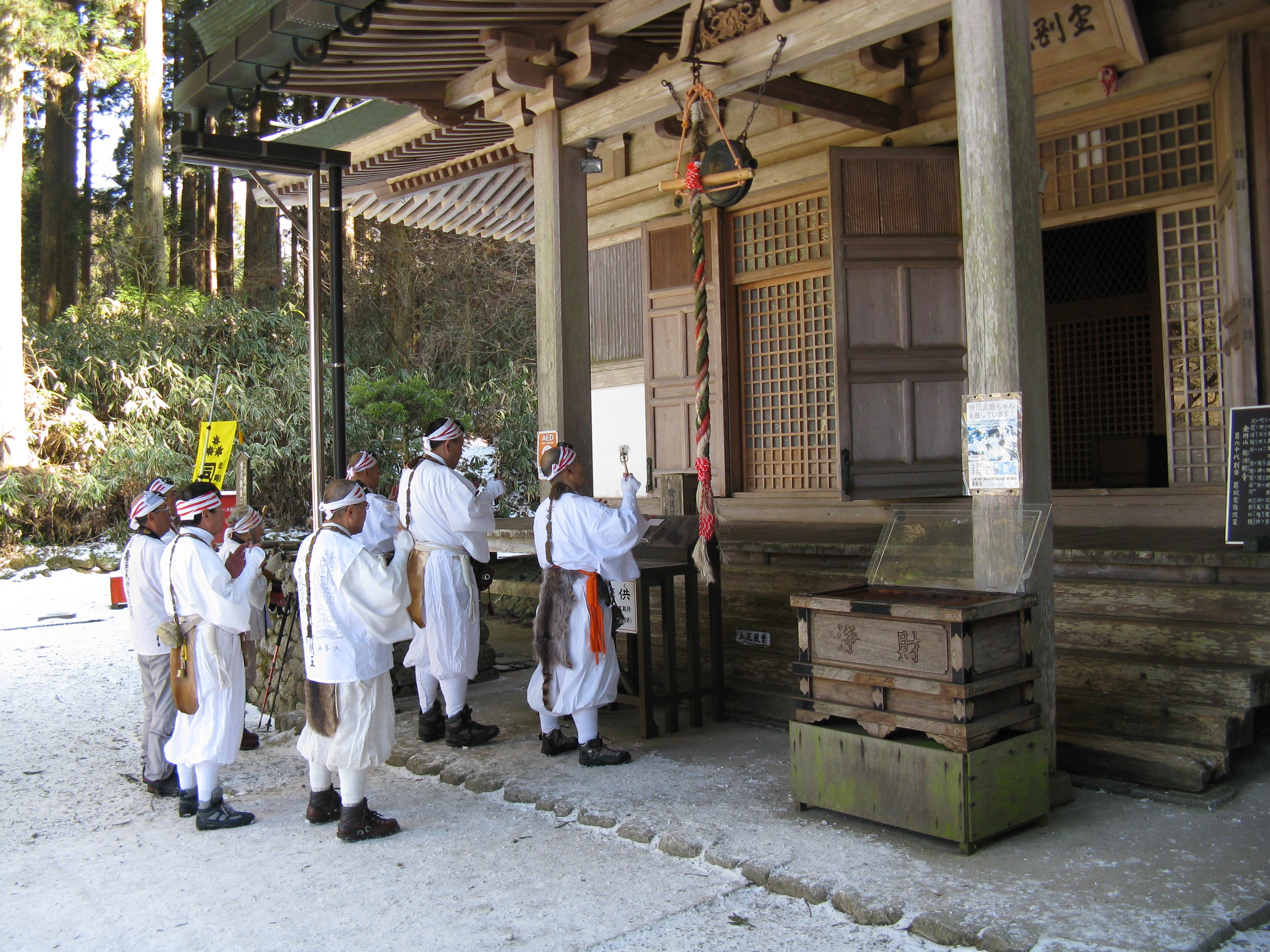
Yamabushi priests at Gose, Nara

Shugendō was founded in 7th-century Japan by the ascetic En no Gyōja, based on the Queen's Peacocks Sutra. With its origins in the solitary hijiri back in the 7th century, Shugendō evolved as a sort of amalgamation between Esoteric Buddhism, Shinto and several other religious influences including Taoism. Buddhism and Shinto were amalgamated in the shinbutsu shūgō, and Kūkai's syncretic religion held wide sway up until the end of the Edo period, coexisting with Shinto elements within Shugendō

In 1613 during the Edo period, the Tokugawa Shogunate issued a regulation obliging Shugendō temples to belong to either Shingon or Tendai temples. During the Meiji Restoration, when Shinto was declared an independent state religion separate from Buddhism, Shugendō was banned as a superstition not fit for a new, enlightened Japan. Some Shugendō temples converted themselves into various officially approved Shintō denominations. In modern times, Shugendō is practiced mainly by Tendai and Shingon sects, retaining an influence on modern Japanese religion and culture.

=== Southern Esoteric Buddhism ===
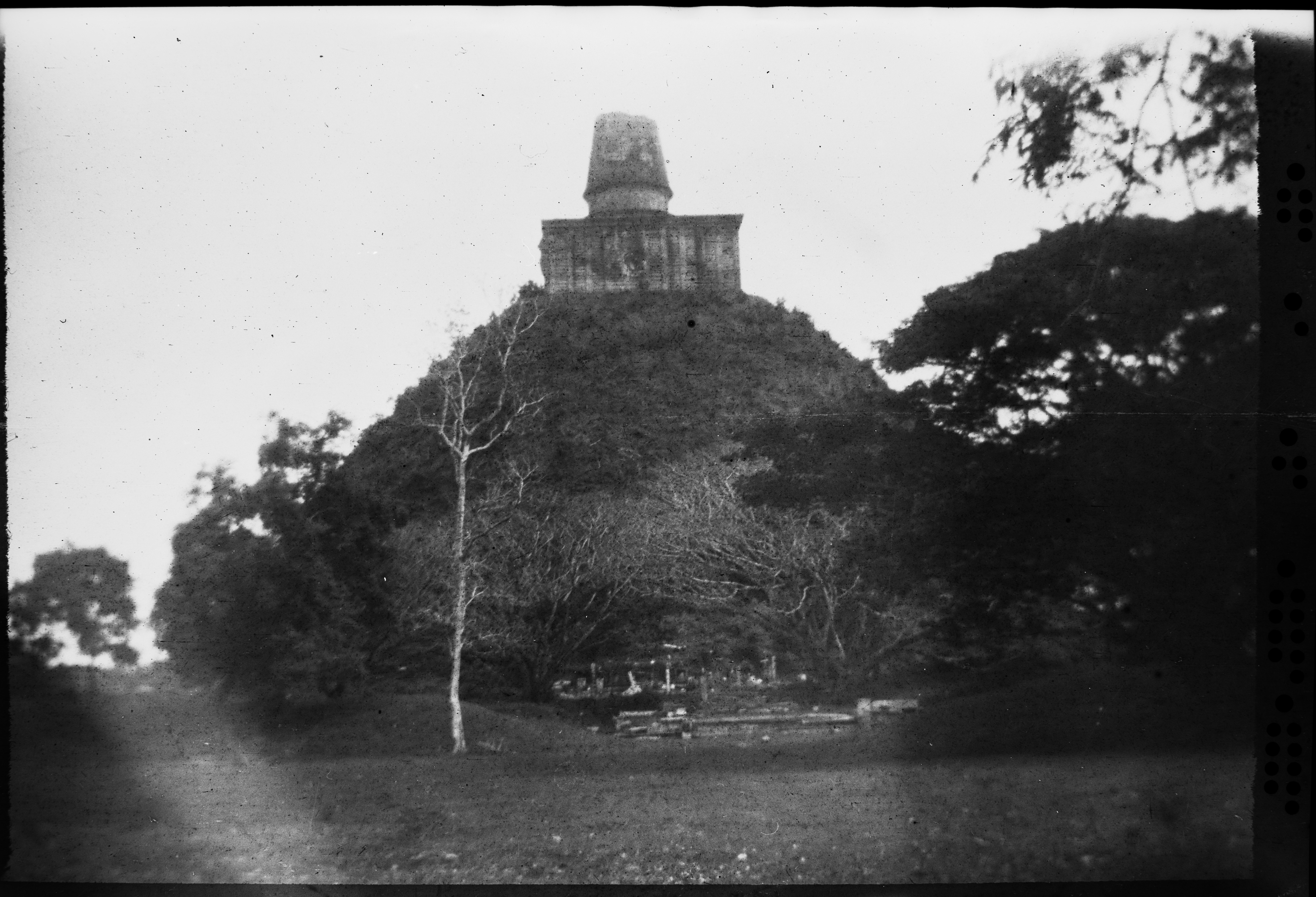
Abhayagiri vihara was a thriving centre of esoteric Buddhism in Sri Lanka until its suppression by Parakramabahu I.

"Southern Esoteric Buddhism" or Borān kammaṭṭhāna ('ancient practices') is a term for esoteric forms of Buddhism from Southeast Asia, where Theravada Buddhism is dominant. The monks of the Sri Lankan, Abhayagiri vihara once practiced forms of tantra which were popular in the island. Another tradition of this type was Ari Buddhism, which was common in Burma. The Tantric Buddhist 'Yogāvacara' tradition was a major Buddhist tradition in Cambodia, Laos and Thailand well into the modern era.

Southern Esoteric Buddhism is a unique Southeast Asian development based on Theravada Abhidhamma and Pali language sources. As such, it has no direct connection to the Indian "Vajrayana" of the Buddhist tantras, the Indian mahasiddhas and the Nalanda-Vikramashila traditions.

Southern Esoteric Buddhism declined after the rise of Southeast Asian Buddhist modernism. However, esoteric Buddhist practices remain in some contemporary South East Asian traditions, including the Thai Dhammakaya tradition, the Burmese Weizza tradition and in rural Cambodian Buddhism.

== Academic study difficulties ==
Serious Vajrayana academic study in the Western world is in early stages due to the following obstacles:

1. Although a large number of Tantric scriptures are extant, they have not been formally ordered or systematized.
2. Due to the esoteric initiatory nature of the tradition, many practitioners will not divulge information or sources of their information.
3. As with many different subjects, it must be studied in context and with a long history spanning many different cultures.
4. Ritual, as well as doctrine, need to be investigated.

Buddhist tantric practice is categorized as secret practice; this is to avoid misinformed people from harmfully misusing the practices. A method to keep this secrecy is that tantric initiation is required from a master before any instructions can be received about the actual practice. During the initiation procedure in the highest class of tantra (such as the Kalachakra), students must take the tantric vows which commit them to such secrecy. "Explaining general tantra theory in a scholarly manner, not sufficient for practice, is likewise not a root downfall. Nevertheless, it weakens the effectiveness of our tantric practice."

=== Terminology ===
The terminology associated with Vajrayana Buddhism can be confusing. Most of the terms originated in the Sanskrit language of tantric Indian Buddhism and may have passed through other cultures, notably those of Japan and Tibet, before translation for the modern reader. Further complications arise as seemingly equivalent terms can have subtle variations in use and meaning according to context, the time and place of use. A third problem is that Vajrayana texts employ the tantric tradition of twilight language, a means of instruction that is deliberately coded. These obscure teaching methods relying on symbolism as well as synonym, metaphor and word association add to the difficulties faced by those attempting to understand Vajrayana Buddhism:

In the Vajrayana tradition, now preserved mainly in Tibetan lineages, it has long been recognized that certain important teachings are expressed in a form of secret symbolic language known as saṃdhyā-bhāṣā, 'Twilight Language'. Mudrās and mantras, maṇḍalas and cakras, those mysterious devices and diagrams that were so much in vogue in the pseudo-Buddhist hippie culture of the 1960s, were all examples of Twilight Language [...]

The term Tantric Buddhism was not one originally used by those who practiced it. As scholar Isabelle Onians explains:

"Tantric Buddhism" [...] is not the transcription of a native term, but a rather modern coinage, if not totally occidental. For the equivalent Sanskrit tāntrika is found, but not in Buddhist texts. Tāntrika is a term denoting someone who follows the teachings of scriptures known as Tantras, but only in Saivism, not Buddhism [...] Tantric Buddhism is a name for a phenomenon which calls itself, in Sanskrit, Mantranaya, Vajrayāna, Mantrayāna or Mantramahāyāna (and apparently never Tantrayāna). Its practitioners are known as mantrins, yogis, or sādhakas. Thus, our use of the anglicised adjective “Tantric” for the Buddhist religion taught in Tantras is not native to the tradition, but is a borrowed term which serves its purpose.

== See also ==
- Buddhism in Bhutan
- Buddhism in Mongolia
- Buddhism in Nepal
- Buddhism in Russia
- Buddhism in the Maldives
- Eastern esotericism
- Malaysian Vajrayana
- Mikkyō, Japanese esoteric Buddhism
- Tukdam
