= Mat Giao Friendship Association =

Mat Giao Friendship Association is a religious non-profit association in the US, was established in 1987.

== Works ==
Mat Giao (secret Buddhism) Friendship Association (Vietnamese: Hội ái hữu Mật giáo) has propagated the Secret Religion under the name of Secret Buddhism in USA, starting from 1987.

This association has published secret Buddhism, religious, mystical books such as Quintessence of Esoteric Buddhism (Author: Trieu Phuoc- Founder of Mat Giao Friendship Association) and The Nomination of the gods and mysticism (Author: Trieu Phuoc). The Association had circulated Tap san Mat giáo (a quarterly magazine) for a period of three years when Mat giao Friendship Association also ceased to operate publicly.

Mat Giao Friendship Association in Virginia had sent its Secret Religion books to Vietnamese's temples and pagoda worldwide and especially, it introduced a special initiation ritual to prove the existence of the Invisible World (i.e. God, Buddhas, Deities, Archangels...) which could be self-performed with magical result at home.

== Books ==
- Phước Triệu (2004). Quintessence of Esoteric Buddhism. Mat Giao Friendship Association. OCLC 660162539.
- Phước Triệu (2005). The Nomination of the Gods and Mysticism. Mat Giao Friendship Association. OCLC 706678295.
