= Caravan (trailer) =

Type of vehicle

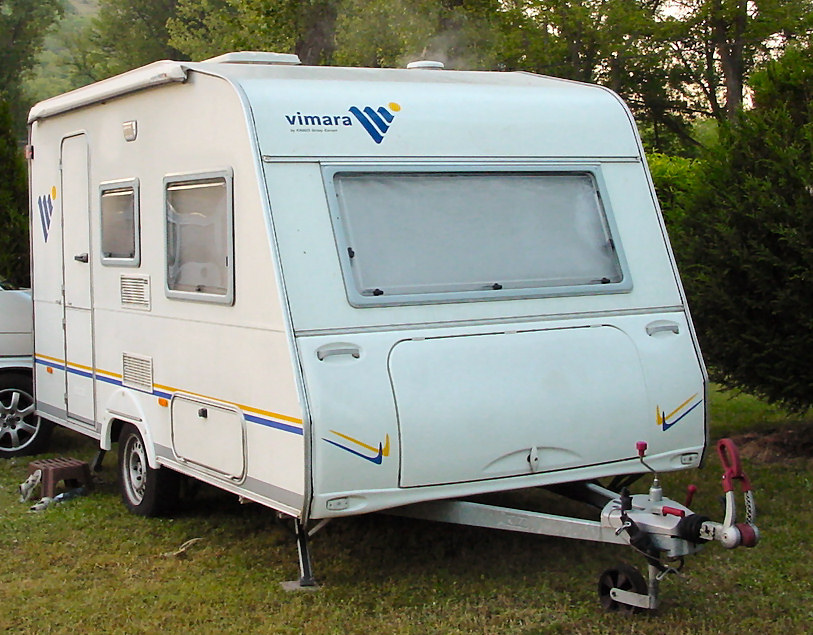
Caravan, Netherlands, 2005

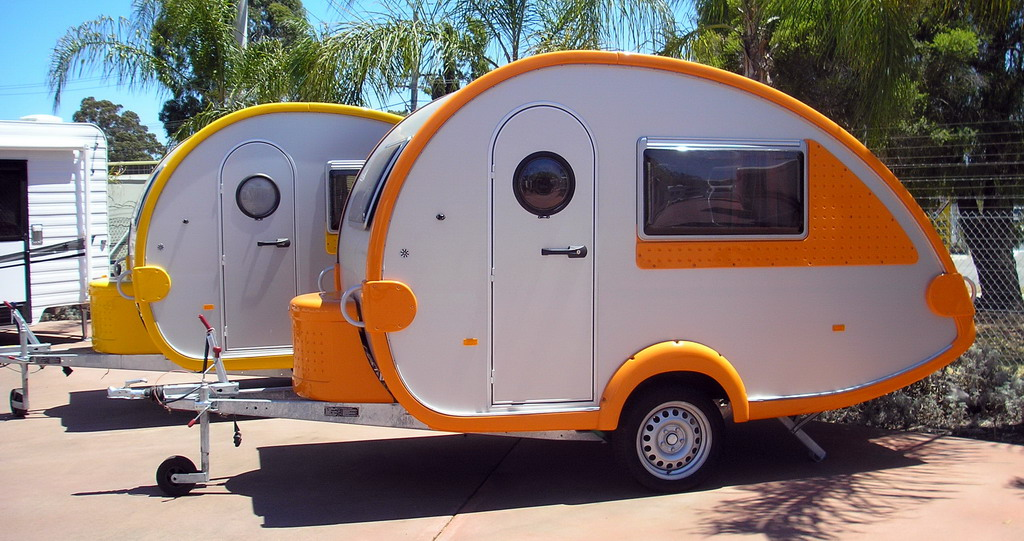
Teardrop trailers

A caravan, travel trailer, camper, tourer, camper trailer, or trailer-camper, is a trailer towed behind a road vehicle to provide a place to sleep which is more comfortable and protected than a tent (although there are fold-down trailer tents). It provides the means for people to have their own home on a journey or a vacation, without relying on a motel or hotel, and enables them to stay in places where none is available. However, in some countries campers are restricted to designated sites for which fees are payable.

Caravans vary from basic models which may be little more than a tent on wheels to those containing several rooms with all the furniture and furnishings and equipment of a home. Construction of the solid-wall trailers can be made of metal or fiberglass. Travel trailers are used principally in North America, Europe, Australia and New Zealand.

The word caravan (sometimes trailer caravan in distinction to motor caravan) is regional to Great Britain, while in North America they are called travel trailers or camper trailer; different parts of the anglosphere may use further variations on either of these. This has led to further variations, such as in New Zealand a motor caravan is typically called a motorhome in North America. In North America, caravans are included under the umbrella term recreational vehicle, or RV for short - though they do not have to be for recreation, and the term includes travel trailers and many other types. Types of travel trailers in the US include teardrop trailer, fifth-wheel, hybrid, and pop-up. To further clarify, in North America mobile home and trailer parks are generally not caravans or caravan park, those are actually a prefabricated home fixed in place, though sometimes they can be. In general, a caravan park there is more like an RV park, which might have temporary hookups for sewage, power, and/water for a caravan (RV home) but usually allows other types such as motorhomes or campervans. Australian English calls both RV parks and trailer parks, caravan parks. Tiny homes that are mobile can have much in common with a caravan; however, going RVing and the tiny home movement are different trends. One is more about living mobile and/or vacationing, and the other is more about living in a small house mostly in one location. In North America a fifth-wheel is like a bigger caravan that mounts into the bed of a truck rather than a trailer hitch.

A caravan fits in the range of vehicles that have more fixed structures than a camper trailer, but lack an engine like a campervan or motorhome. In the United States and Canada, most caravans would be called an RV of the subtype, travel trailer.

== History ==
In Europe, the origins of travel trailers and caravanning can be traced back to the travelling Romani people, and showmen who spent most of their lives in horse-drawn caravans. Samuel White Baker purchased an actual Romani wagon in Britain and shipped it to Cyprus for his tour in 1879. The world's first leisure trailer was built by the Bristol Wagon & Carriage Works in 1880 for William Gordon Stables, a popular author of teenage adventure fiction, who ordered a "gentleman's caravan". It was an 18-foot (5.5 m) design, based upon their Bible Wagons, used by travelling preachers in America's Wild West. Stables named it Wanderer. In 1885 he travelled around the British countryside in it, and the following year released a book documenting his travels, called The Cruise of the Land Yacht "Wanderer", or Thirteen Hundred Miles in my Caravan. This moved the Duke of Newcastle to commission his own caravan, The Bohemian.

By the turn of the century, caravanning for leisure had become an increasingly popular activity. In 1901, the first dedicated caravanning club was established. The Camping and Caravanning Club (originally the Association of Cycle Campers) was founded by Thomas Hiram Holding, the father of modern camping. The Caravan Club was founded in 1907 with Stables as its vice president. Its stated aim was to "... bring together those interested in van life as a pastime ... to improve and supply suitable vans and other appliances ... and to arrange camping grounds". Caravanning gained popularity in North America in the 1920s.

Modern travel trailers come in a range of sizes, from very small two-berth trailers with no toilet and only basic kitchen facilities, to large, triple-axle, six-berth types.

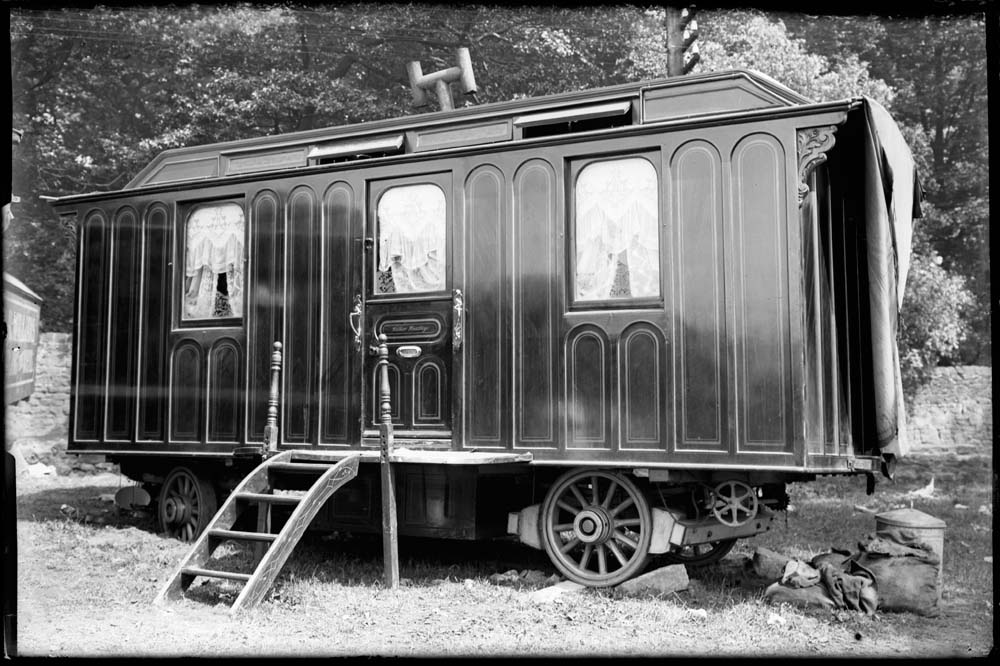
Elaborate caravan built by Howcroft of West Hartlepool for an English showman, first half of the 20th century.

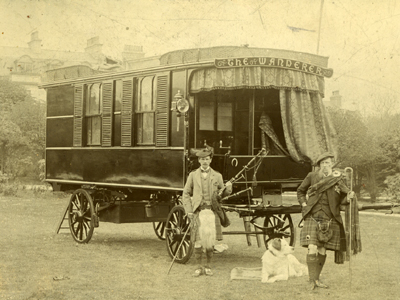
William Gordon Stables in his leisure caravan, the Wanderer.

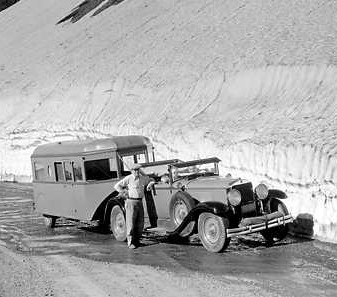
Car and tourist observation trailer, Glacier National Park, Montana, 1933

=== Romani caravan ===
Caravans, particularly the vardo, have served both as a significant cultural icon and symbol of the nomadic Romani people. Until the early 19th century, Romani caravans served primarily as a means of transport and not as a domicile. At the beginning of the 19th century, more Romani people began to live in their caravans instead of sleeping in tents. The caravan offered greater protection from weather conditions and could be outfitted with modern amenities such as wood-burning stoves. Often, caravans were commissioned to be built at the request of newlywed couples and their families. The small-scale, pre-industrial methods of the builders and the labour-intensive nature of the building process meant that a family's caravan could take up to a year to build.

== Standards ==
Trailer caravan is defined in ISO Standard 3833:1977, Road vehicles – Types – Terms and definitions, term No 3.2.1.3.

== North America ==
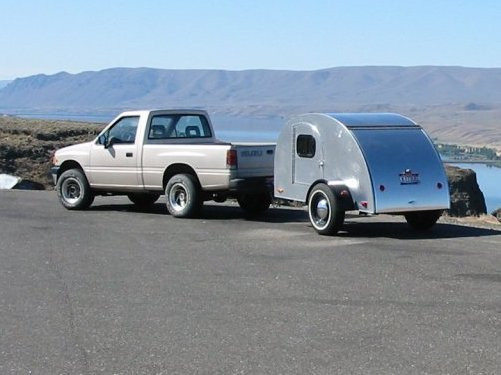
A teardrop trailer

In North America, the term caravan is obscure. A caravan is an RV, and going RVing would be caravanning. Most caravan designs would probably be called a travel trailer, or in some cases a fifth wheel or camper trailer. Caravans can go to RV parks or some camp sites— not trailer parks, which usually communities of semi-permanent structures called mobile homes. However, sometimes they can be actual collections of trailers with wheels that are very mobile.

=== Travel trailer ===
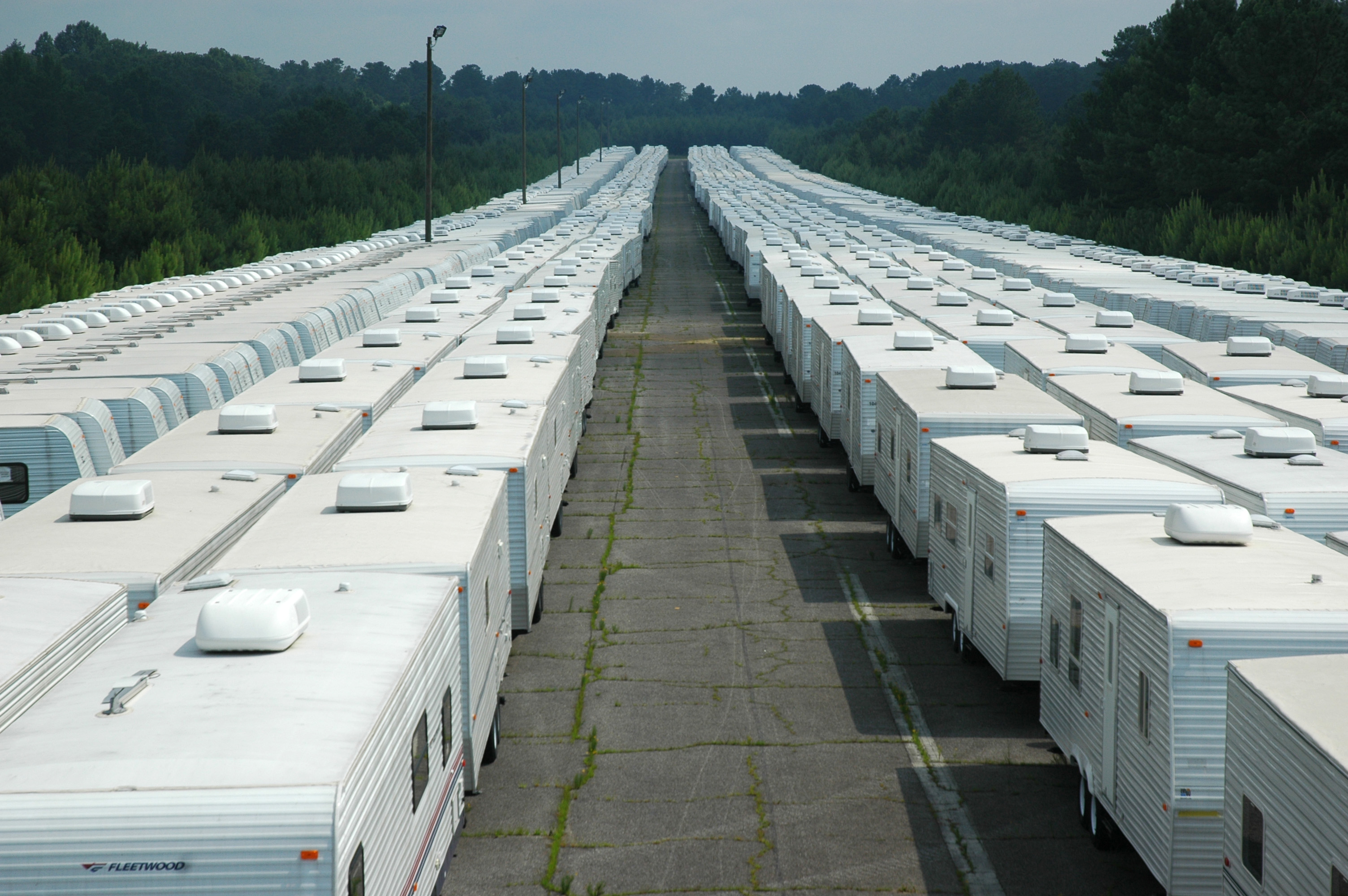
Travel trailers being prepared as disaster relief housing, for the 2005 Hurricane season in the United States

In the United States and Canada, the history of travel trailers can be traced back to the early 1920s, when those who enjoyed their use were often referred to as 'tin can tourists'. As time progressed, trailers became more liveable and earned a new name in the 1930s and 1940s, which was the house trailer. In the 1950s and 1960s, the industry seemed to split, creating the two types that are seen today, that of the recreational vehicle (RV) industry and mobile home industry. Travel trailers are classified as a type of RV along with motorhomes, fifth-wheel trailers, pop-up trailers, and truck campers.

Smaller travel trailers and pop-ups are still made with touring in mind. These generally are less than 18 feet (5.5 m) long and contain simple amenities. By design, they are lightweight and quick to set up or prepare for travel. Most weigh less than 3,000 pounds (1,400 kg) and can be towed with a large car or small truck depending upon its towing capacity. Lightweight pop-up trailers weighing less than 700 pounds (320 kg), such as the Combi-camper and Kamparoo can be towed even by small economy cars. Some exceptionally-light travel trailers can be pulled by a motorcycle or even bicycle. Fiberglass body construction entered the U.S. scene in 1971 with the introduction of the first U.S.-produced mini travel trailer, called the Playpac. Since then, moulded fiberglass trailers have gained more popularity due to many factors including durability, lightweight design, modern features and a modern nod to retro chic design.

The Playpac, invented by Steven Whysel, was the answer to the needs of the growing horde of VW "Bug" and other small-car owners who wanted a hard-shelled camper, light enough to be pulled by a small car. It came with a private water closet, shower, and the ability to sleep six. Its ultramodern aerodynamic styling and domed skylight by the modernist industrial designer Toshihiko Sakow made it an instant hit. It was short-lived, however (1971–1973), as the first Arab Oil Embargo and the ensuing major slow-down of RV sales caused it to cease operations. The Boler travel trailer was developed in Canada in 1968, soon joining the Playpac in the U.S. fiberglass light-weight class. The Hunter and Amerigo travel trailers were also available at that time. As moulded fiberglass technology advanced, more companies entered into the market. Key moulded fiberglass innovations made the travel trailers more durable but also lighter which allowed for more luxury amenities.

Mid-range travel trailers are 18 to 25 feet (5.5 to 7.6 m) long, can weigh 5,000 pounds (2,300 kg) or more, and are generally towed with compact pickup trucks and SUVs. They have most of the amenities of the larger travel trailers, but sleep fewer people.

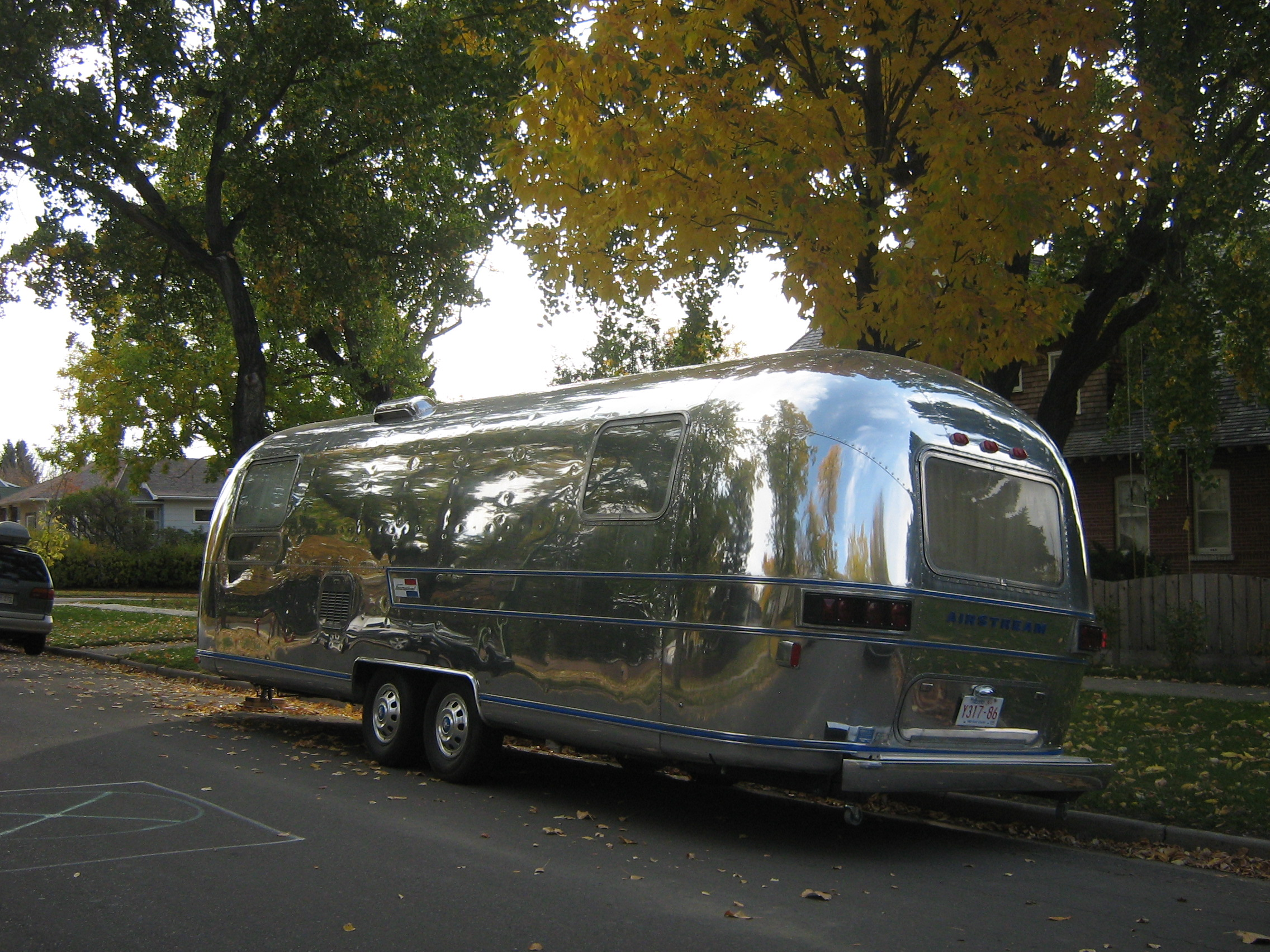
An Airstream travel trailer

Larger travel trailers are made with seasonal or full-time users in mind. These generally range from 25 to 40 feet (7.6 to 12.2 m) long and contain all the comforts of a luxury condominium. These amenity-laden models can reach 12,000 pounds (5,400 kg) or more, requiring a purpose-built tow vehicle, highway tractor or large truck or SUV. While trailers may weigh in even above that, most long-bed pickups have a maximum tow-weight of 15,500 pounds (7,000 kg). Multiple televisions and air conditioners are common in units of this size. Slide-out rooms and screen porches add to livability. By law, travel trailers are limited to 400 square feet (37 m^{2}) of living area, and many models offer exactly that plus any optional slide-outs.

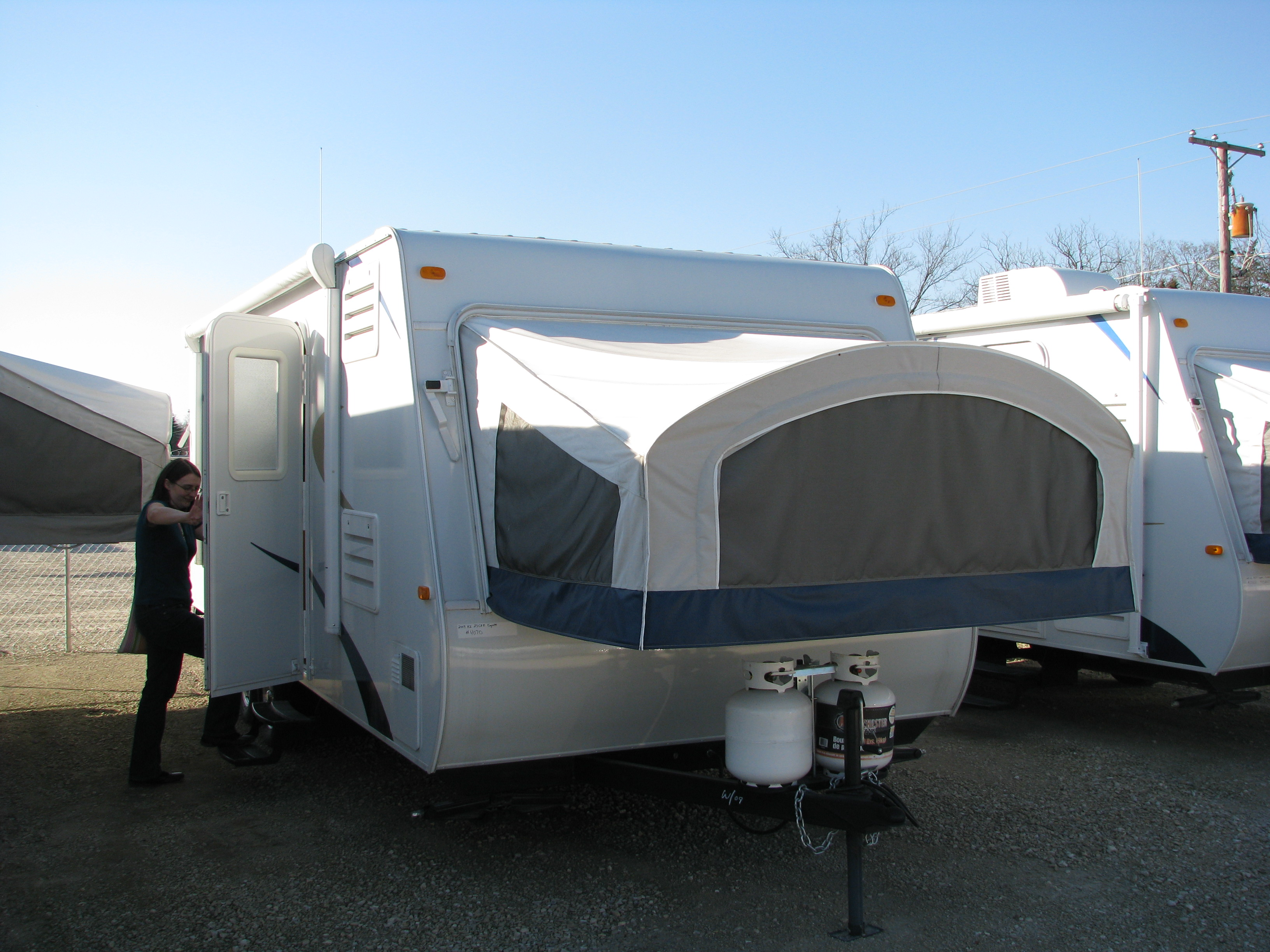
A hybrid travel trailer

With all of the disincentives inherent in local government zoning regulations and building codes to affordable, ecological (off-grid) and compact housing solutions, travel-trailers offer a possibility for those considering an ecological full-time home or seasonal cottage. Travel-trailers are often acceptable on flood-plains, areas outside of urban growth limits, et cetera, where regular buildings are not allowed. Among the virtues of a trailer park are its light infrastructure, low ecological footprint, minimal land disturbance, abundant permeable surfaces (for stormwater drainage), and ease of site restoration.

Some specialized brands of the trailer, such as the hi-lo trailer, have an upper half (slightly larger than the lower half) that can be folded down over the lower half to a total height of about five feet for reduced wind resistance during travel; these otherwise contain everything other travel trailers have (except for a full-height closet).

Innovation in travel trailers is the hybrid travel trailer, combining the features of a pop-up and a hard-sided trailer. In its camping configuration, one or more bunks fold down from the side with canvas tent covers. When travelling, the bunks fold up, leaving four hard sides. Larger models allow the hybrid travel trailer to be used while "turtled" – meaning with the sides up. The primary advantage of a hybrid travel trailer is it offers a greater space-to-weight ratio. A disadvantage is the tent ends are not insulated and are subject to heat loss and condensation.

In the United States, it is generally illegal for passengers to ride in a travel trailer, while in motion, unlike horse-drawn trailers and coaches. Triple towing (towing two trailers) is not allowed in some U.S. states, such as California, Alabama, Florida, or New York; however, triple towing is permitted in Texas if the combined length does not exceed 65 feet (20 m).

=== Fifth-wheel trailer ===
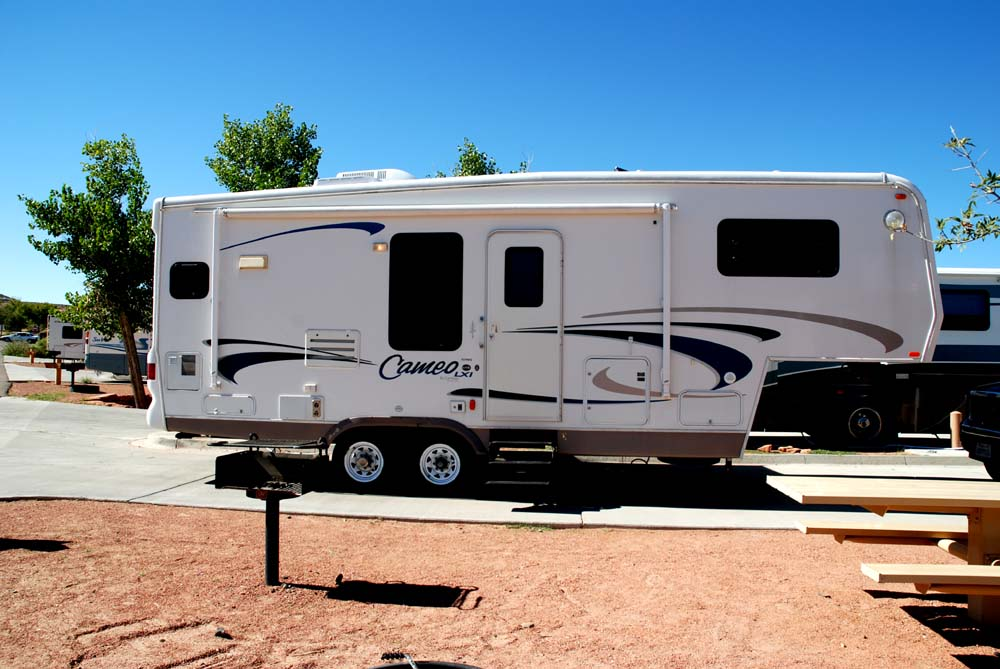
Fifth wheel camper

A fifth-wheel is a travel trailer supported by a hitch in the centre of the bed of a pickup truck instead of a hitch at the back of a vehicle. The special hitch used for fifth-wheels is a smaller version of the one used on 18-wheeler trucks and can be connected by simply driving (backing) the tow vehicle under the trailer. Fifth-wheel trailers are popular with full-time recreational vehicle enthusiasts, who often live in them for several months in one place, using their pickup truck tow vehicle for local errands. A fifth-wheel trailer tows more securely than a traditional travel trailer because the hitch weight sits directly over the pickup truck's rear axle or tires. Since part of a fifth wheel sits in the bed of the pickup, it reduces the overall length of the vehicle-and-trailer combination while allowing the same room as a comparable-length travel trailer. Additionally, the hitch's location in the pickup's bed reduces the risk of jackknifing and allows for more maneuverability when backing. Because of the greater room available on the roads in North America, these vehicles are more popular in the United States and Canada than in Europe or other parts of the world. For uneven terrain, a gooseneck hitch is an option for fifth-wheel trailers.

The downside is that the hitch takes up room in the pickup truck's cargo bed regardless of whether the trailer is hitched or not. The hitch can be unbolted from the bed but this takes a lot more time and effort than the unhitch operation.

The largest fifth-wheel trailers are full-size semi-trailers that range from 14.5 to 17.5 m (48 to 57 ft) in length and require a tractor unit as the towing vehicle due to their weight and the use of air brakes.

=== Off-road trailer ===
Off-road travel trailers, also called 4x4 trailers, tentrax, and jeep trailers, are built specifically for exploring the extreme backcountry without having the restriction of paved highways or gravel roads. These travel trailers are designed to handle rough terrain. Many off-road travel trailers are equipped with tents, beds, skid plates, large tires and long stroke independent suspensions, lift kits, and articulation systems.

== United Kingdom ==
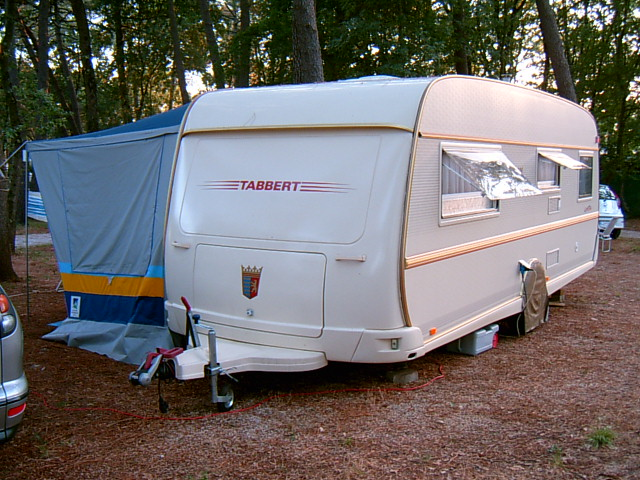
High-end German-made caravan by Knaus Tabbert

The National Caravan Council estimates that the caravan industry, which includes motorhomes, touring caravans (caravans designed to be hitched to a car and towed to a site), and static caravans and mobile homes (caravans designed to be transported to a permanent site, where they are anchored to the ground), is now worth over £1 bn (€1.5 bn/US$1.7 bn) to the British economy alone, with the manufacture of caravans worth in excess of £650 mn (€975 mn/US$1.1 bn). The growth in popularity of caravanning has been enhanced by improvements in caravan quality and caravan site facilities, making caravan holidays possible at any time of the year.

There are two main organisations that many caravanners join in the United Kingdom: the Caravan and Motorhome Club, established in 1907, and the Camping and Caravanning Club ('The Caravan Club Limited'), established in 1901. Both clubs offer a range of services, including exclusive club sites, preferential rates, advice, insurance, and community activities including regional and national rallies.

In the UK, caravan insurance is not compulsory but is recommended due to the high value of touring caravans.

Under tax regulations, caravans are considered wasting chattel and are exempt from capital gains tax.

== Australia ==
In Australia, camper trailers are common alongside the traditional caravan. Camper trailers differentiate themselves from similar products due to their ability to go off-road. They feature large water holding tanks, batteries for electricity and off-road suspension.

Camper trailers

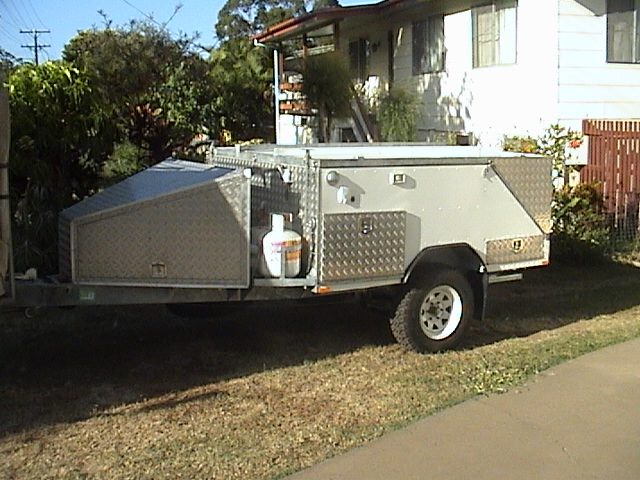
Custom camper trailer

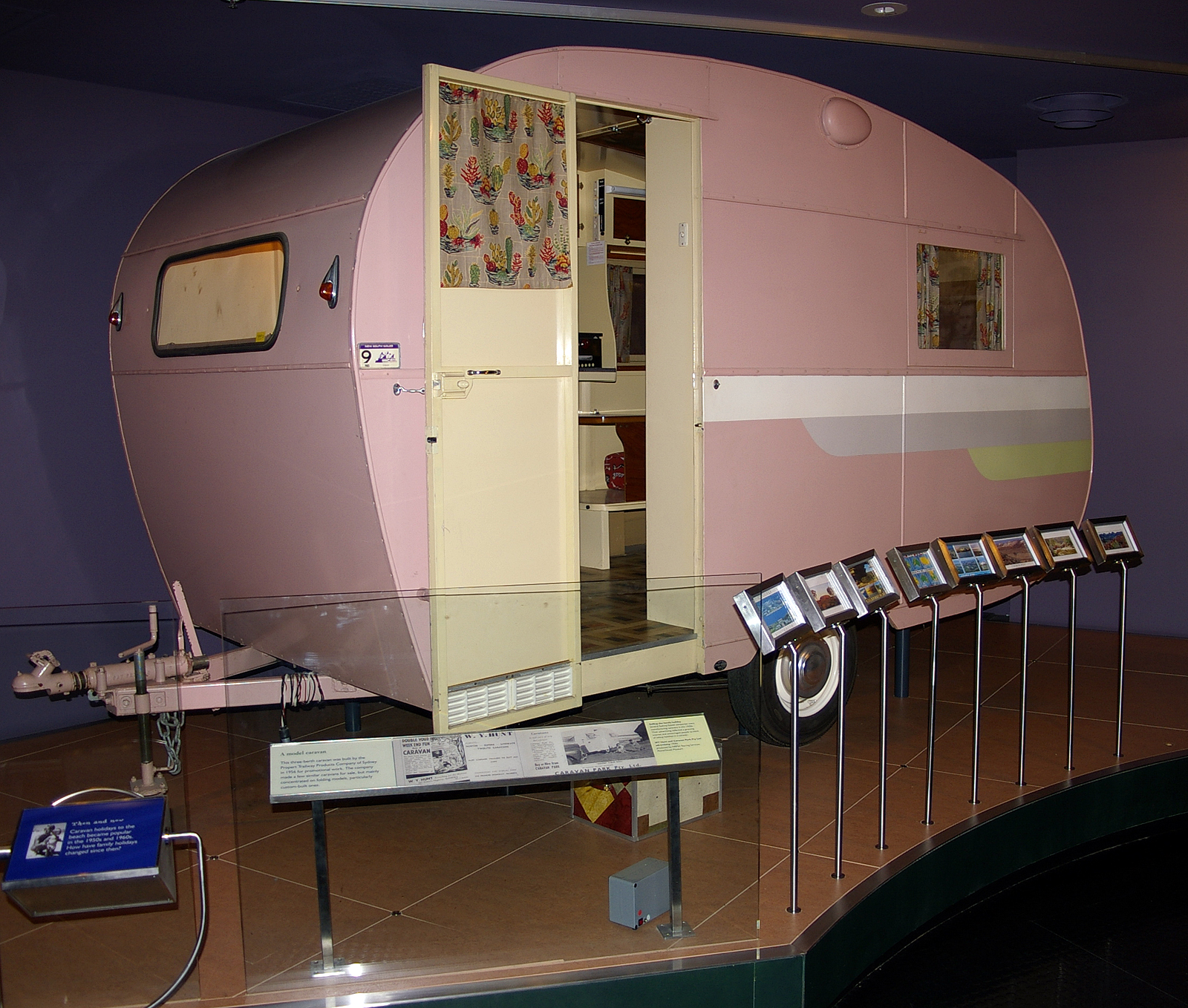
1956 Propert Trailaway Touring caravan at the National Museum of Australia

== New Zealand ==
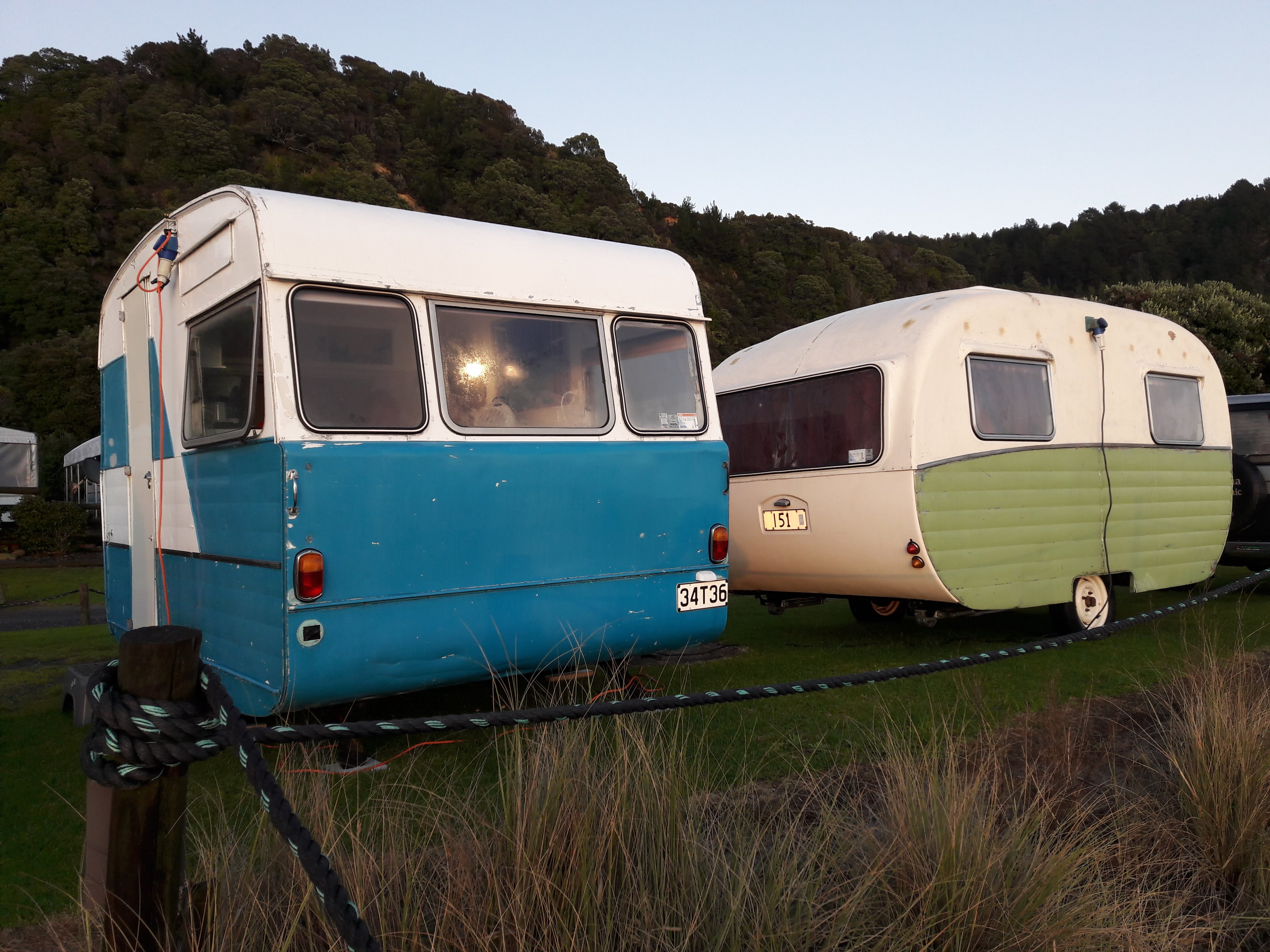
Caravans in New Zealand

In New Zealand the term caravan is used, but campervans or motorhomes may be called motor caravans. New Zealand has hundreds of free camping sites and campervans and motorhomes are popular ways to access the sites. However, at the end of 2023 they enacted tighter regulations – especially in regards to the toilet facilities. The New Zealand Motor Caravan Association notes RVs must have certain minimum standards for certification.

== Amenities ==
A mid-range, modern travel trailer may contain the following features:

- Beds, some of which convert to daytime seating
- Electricity supplied by battery or external hookup
- Gas- or electric-powered refrigerator
- Gas- or electric-powered stove, oven and grill
- Gas- or electric-powered water heater
- Microwave
- Powered wheel mover system (integrated or clip-on) to enable parking once unhitched
- Audio player or video player (such as a radio, CD player, DVD player, digital audio player)
- Shower
- Television (with an aerial, satellite dish, or both)
- Toilet with removable blackwater (sewage) disposal tank and flush-water tank
- Heater
- Slide-outs, which extend the width of a room or space, such as a 4-by-7-foot (1.2 m × 2.1 m) dinette or bedroom extension

Travel trailers (especially ones in North America) may also contain the following:

- Air conditioning
- Awning or screen room
- Washing machine and clothes dryer
- External barbecue points
- Tow hitch stabilizers
- Separate wastewater tanks for greywater (wash water) and blackwater (sewage)

== Reception ==
Due to the 50 mph (80 km/h) maximum speed limit on single carriageways for caravans on the United Kingdom's crowded and often narrow roads, caravans are seen as a nuisance by some motorists. The motoring journalist and presenter Jeremy Clarkson is well known for his gleeful hatred of caravans, and has physically destroyed several of them on the BBC television programme Top Gear since the show's relaunch in 2002, leading to complaints from the caravan community.

== See also ==
- Campervan
- Popup camper
- Mobile home
- Teardrop trailer
- Recreational vehicle
- RV park
- List of recreational vehicle manufacturers
