= Trails and Rails =

National Parks collaboration with Amtrak

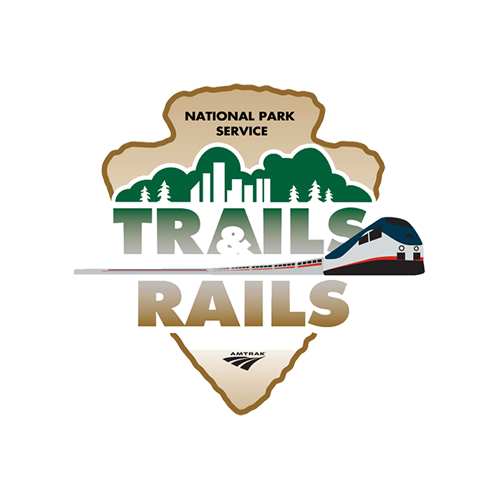
Trails & Rails logo

Trails & Rails is a program of the National Park Service, in conjunction with Amtrak, wherein Ranger Guides and Volunteers-In-Parks provide interpretation of a region's history and ecology aboard select Amtrak train routes. The program's goal is to "reach out to people who may not traditionally visit National Park Service areas", according to former NPS Director Robert Stanton.

== History ==
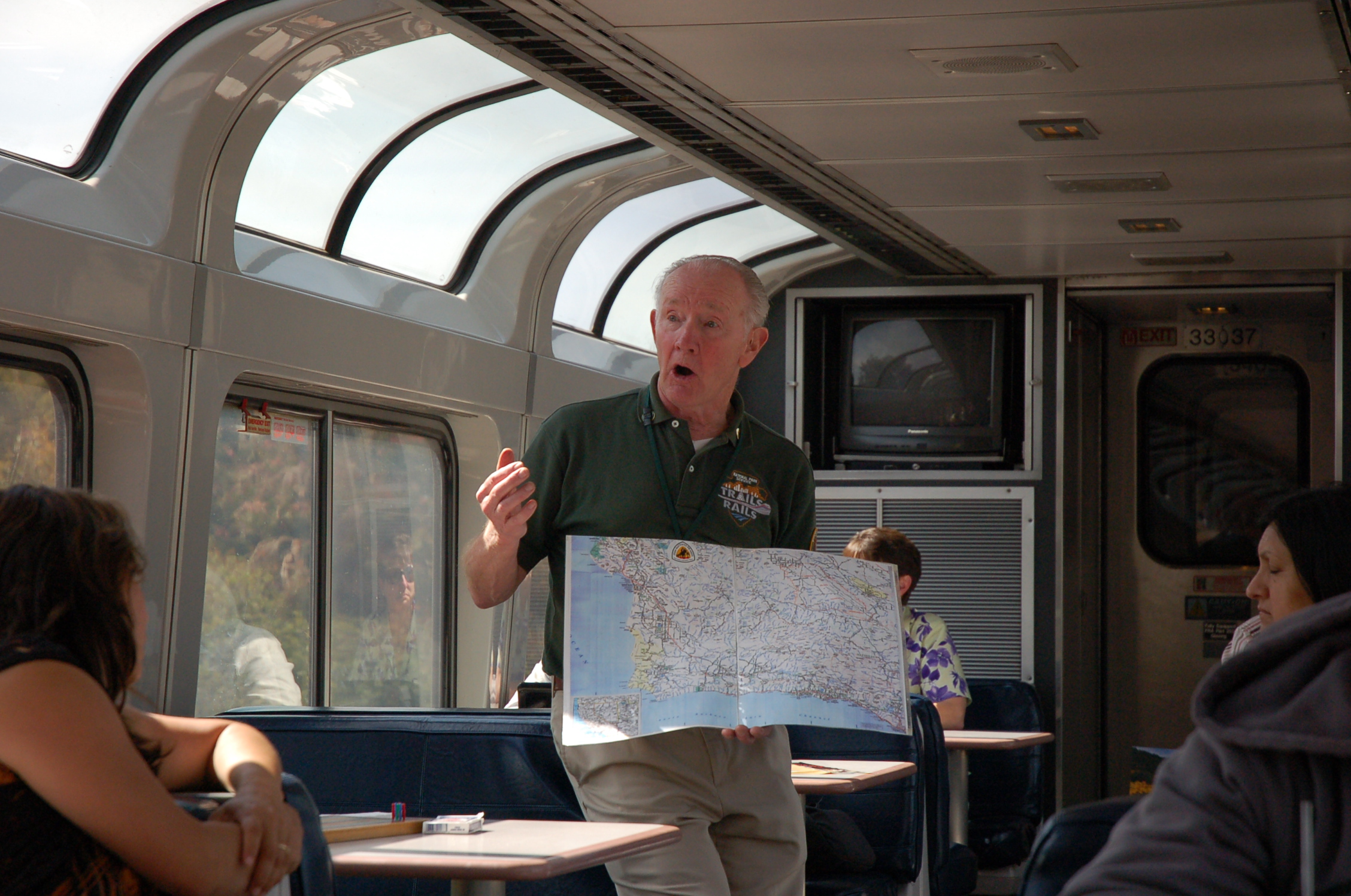
Trails & Rails volunteer aboard the Coast Starlight in 2009, interpreting the Juan Bautista de Anza National Historic Trail

The idea behind Trails & Rails first formed from an Amtrak marketing director who was on board the Sunset Limited and overheard a National Park Service ranger talking with passengers about the sites outside the window of the Sightseer Lounge. That ranger, James Miculka, served as Chief of Interpretation at Jean Lafitte National Historical Park and Preserve in New Orleans, and started the program with staff from the park aboard the Sunset Limited and soon the City of New Orleans.

Trails & Rails officially became a nationwide program in 2000 when an agreement was signed between the National Park Service and Amtrak. Since then, the program has expanded to nearly two dozen routes under the leadership of National Coordinator Jim Miculka.

Around 2007, NPS began a partnership with the Department of Recreation, Park, and Tourism Sciences (RPTS) at Texas A&M University to house the management of the program there. RPTS faculty assists in training the new Volunteers-In-Parks (VIPs) who work on the program, as well as providing logistical and technical support to the program. RPTS faculty member Susan Scott serves as the Trails & Rails liaison, and coordinates training and support for the program.

The program was suspended during the early COVID-19 pandemic, but resumed in a limited form in 2021. By 2025, eleven routes were participating.

== Internships ==
Due to the unique relationship between the National Park Service and Texas A&M's Department of Recreation, Park, and Tourism Sciences, students of RPTS are able to support the program through their studies, gaining hands on experiences. Host Parks in other cities around the nation also seek interns from local universities to volunteer aboard the routes in their area. The National Parks of New York Harbor have recruited students from local universities like St. John's to intern with the unit, and gain experiences volunteering aboard the Adirondack, in addition to their work at the parks.

== Routes ==
This list is current as of 19 May 2025.

Route	Origin	Endpoint	Sponsoring National Park System unit
Adirondack	New York City	Albany–Rensselaer	National Parks of New York Harbor, Home of Franklin D. Roosevelt National Historic Site, Vanderbilt Mansion National Historic Site
Adirondack	Saratoga Springs	Westport	Saratoga National Historical Park
Cardinal	Montgomery	Hinton	New River Gorge National Park and Preserve
Cardinal	Charleston	Clifton Forge	New River Gorge National Park and Preserve
Coast Starlight	Santa Barbara	San Luis Obispo	Juan Bautista de Anza National Historic Trail
Coast Starlight	San Jose	Paso Robles	Juan Bautista de Anza National Historic Trail
Coast Starlight	Seattle	Portland	Klondike Gold Rush National Historical Park
Crescent	Atlanta	New Orleans	Martin Luther King Jr. National Historical Park
Empire Builder	Seattle	Wenatchee	Klondike Gold Rush National Historical Park
Empire Service	New York City	Albany–Rensselaer	National Parks of New York Harbor, Home of Franklin D. Roosevelt National Historic Site, Vanderbilt Mansion National Historic Site
Heartland Flyer	Oklahoma City	Fort Worth	Oklahoma City National Memorial
Lincoln Service	Springfield	Chicago	Lincoln Home National Historic Site
Lincoln Service	St. Louis	Springfield	Gateway Arch National Park
Missouri River Runner	St. Louis	Jefferson City	Gateway Arch National Park
Northeast Regional	Washington, D.C.	New York City	National Mall and Memorial Parks
Texas Eagle	Springfield	Chicago	Lincoln Home National Historic Site

=== Former routes ===
Route	Start	End	Sponsoring National Park System unit
Blue Water	Chicago	Niles	Indiana Dunes National Park
Wolverine	Chicago	Niles	Indiana Dunes National Park
Capitol Limited	Cumberland	Washington, D.C.	Chesapeake and Ohio Canal National Historical Park
City of New Orleans	Jackson	Hammond	Medgar and Myrlie Evers Home National Monument
Empire Builder	St. Paul	Columbus	Mississippi National River and Recreation Area
Pacific Surfliner	Los Angeles	San Diego	Cabrillo National Monument
Southwest Chief	La Junta	Las Vegas	Bent's Old Fort National Historic Site
