= America the Beautiful Pass =

Annual or lifetime pass for US national parks

The America the Beautiful Pass (also known as the Interagency Pass) series comprises annual or lifetime passes that grant the holder entrance to more than 2,000 federally protected areas including national parks, national monuments, and other protected areas managed by six federal agencies: the National Park Service, the Forest Service, the Fish and Wildlife Service, the Bureau of Land Management, the Bureau of Reclamation, and the Army Corps of Engineers. At per-vehicle fee areas, the pass entitles the holder and all passengers in a non-commercial vehicle to admission. At per-person fee areas, the pass entitles the holder and up to three additional adults to admission (children under 16 are always admitted free). The pass was created by the Federal Lands Recreation Enhancement Act and authorized by Congress in December 2004, which is Division J, Title VIII of the Consolidated Appropriations Act, 2005, Public Law 108–447, 118 Stat. 2809, an omnibus appropriations act. Passes are available at all National Park Service sites that charge entrance fees as well as online through the United States Geological Survey online store. The passes have been described as one of the best deals in recreation.

On November 25, 2025, it was announced that the 2026 America the Beautiful Annual Pass for US residents will feature Donald Trump's official presidential portrait for his second term. The law that created the America the Beautiful Pass establishes that the imagery for the pass is to be chosen via an annual competition that is open to the public, a process that was not followed for the 2026 design. Critics of the new design have further noted the irony of President Trump's portrait appearing on the pass when his Department of Government Efficiency fired approximately 1,000 NPS employees, which constituted 5% of NPS's workforce. Between terminations, buyouts and resignations, the National Park Service's staffing level was 25% lower nine months into President Trump's second term than it was when he was sworn in.

On December 10, 2025, the Center for Biological Diversity filed a federal lawsuit challenging the legality of the selected image.

Following the announcement of the 2026 pass design, a secondary market emerged for adhesive stickers designed to cover the presidential portrait. By early 2026, the federal government asserted that the use of such stickers could void the pass, in spite of the 1977 Supreme Court decision in Wooley v. Maynard wherein it was held that New Hampshire could not constitutionally require citizens to display the state motto upon their license plates when the state motto was offensive to their moral convictions.

== Series ==
- Annual Pass – a 12-month pass available to everyone for $80. Beginning January 1, 2026, international visitors will pay $250 for the same pass. Passes are valid through the last day of the month in which it is issued the following year.
- Annual 4th Grade Pass – a free pass under the Every Kid Outdoors program available to U.S. 4th graders (or children 10 years of age) that is valid from September through the following August. While children of this age are generally admitted free already, the pass allows free entry for their parents and others accompanying them.
- Military Pass – Members of the U.S. military and their dependents are eligible for a free 12-month pass (with a separate design that distinguishes it from the Annual Pass). These passes, like the Annual Pass, are valid through the last day of the month in which it is issued the following year, but can be renewed each year indefinitely so long as the holder remains eligible. In December 2021, the National Defense Authorization Act for Fiscal Year 2022 authorized veterans of the U.S. military and Gold Star families to receive a free lifetime pass.
- Senior Pass – a lifetime pass for $80 (or annual pass for $20) available to U.S. citizens or permanent residents aged 62 or older. It replaced the Golden Age Passport that functioned similarly and is still valid for those possessing one.
- Access Pass – a free lifetime pass for U.S. citizens or permanent residents with permanent disabilities. It replaced the Golden Access Passport that functioned similarly and is still valid for those possessing one.
- Volunteer Pass – a free annual pass for volunteers (including Volunteers-In-Parks) acquiring 250 service hours with participating federal agencies.

The Senior and Access passes additionally provide a 50% discount on some amenity fees such as camping, swimming, boat launching, and specialized interpretive services at some sites.

== See also ==
- List of fee areas in the United States National Park System
- List of the United States National Park System official units
- Membership campground
