= List of fee areas in the United States National Park System =

Fee areas of the National Park System comprise a minority of the areas of the United States National Park System administered by the National Park Service. A majority of sites are fee-free areas.

The list below includes all areas that charge an entrance or standard amenity fee; generally not included are sites that only charge expanded amenity fees such as those for camping, boat launching, and parking. Sites where nearly all visitors purchase these additional amenities, such as areas with caves that require fee-based guided tours for cave access, are also generally not included. Many areas listed have parts where fees do not apply. Each year, there are a handful of free entrance days when entrance fees are waived at these areas.

Fees are given on a per-vehicle or per-person basis. Per-vehicle fees admit all occupants of a private passenger vehicle, generally for 7-days (unless otherwise noted). Most per-vehicle sites also offer passes for individuals arriving on foot, bicycle, or motorcycle; these are not listed. Fees do not apply to children age 15 or younger unless otherwise noted. All sites accept America the Beautiful Passes to waive entrance fees, which have been described as one of the best deals in recreation. Most fee areas also offer an annual area-specific pass for those who visit the same area often.

Beginning January 1, 2026, non-U.S. residents are now also charged a $100 nonresident fee (in addition to the regular entrance fee) to the following 10 national parks, unless they have the Non-Resident Annual Pass: Acadia National Park, Bryce Canyon National Park, Everglades National Park, Glacier National Park, Grand Canyon National Park, Grand Teton National Park, Rocky Mountain National Park, Sequoia & Kings Canyon National Parks, Yellowstone National Park, Yosemite National Park, and Zion National Park.

== List ==
Bold indicates national parks.

Name	Location	Typical fee	Fee type	Website	Notes
Little River Canyon National Preserve	Alabama	$15	per-vehicle		
**Denali National Park and Preserve**	Alaska	$15	per-person		
Glen Canyon National Recreation Area	Arizona	$30	per-vehicle		
Glen Canyon National Recreation Area	Utah	$30	per-vehicle		
**Grand Canyon National Park**	Arizona	$35	per-vehicle		
Montezuma Castle National Monument	Arizona	$10	per-person		passes valid at Tuzigoot National Monument
Organ Pipe Cactus National Monument	Arizona	$25	per-vehicle		
**Petrified Forest National Park**	Arizona	$25	per-vehicle		
Pipe Spring National Monument	Arizona	$10	per-person		
**Saguaro National Park**	Arizona	$25	per-vehicle		
Sunset Crater Volcano National Monument	Arizona	$25	per-vehicle		passes valid at Wupatki National Monument
Tonto National Monument	Arizona	$10	per-person		
Tumacacori National Historical Park	Arizona	$10	per-person		
Tuzigoot National Monument	Arizona	$10	per-person		passes valid at Montezuma Castle National Monument
Walnut Canyon National Monument	Arizona	$15	per-person		
Wupatki National Monument	Arizona	$25	per-vehicle		passes valid at Sunset Crater National Monument
Fort Smith National Historic Site	Arkansas	$10	per-person		
Cabrillo National Monument	California	$20	per-vehicle		
**Death Valley National Park**	California	$30	per-vehicle		
**Death Valley National Park**	Nevada	$30	per-vehicle		
Devils Postpile National Monument	California	$8	per-person		fee for daily use of shuttle; other types of passes and limited vehicle access exist
**Joshua Tree National Park**	California	$30	per-vehicle		
**Kings Canyon National Park**	California	$35	per-vehicle		passes valid at Sequoia National Park
**Lassen Volcanic National Park**	California	$30	per-vehicle		
Lava Beds National Monument	California	$25	per-vehicle		
Muir Woods National Monument	California	$15	per-person		
**Pinnacles National Park**	California	$30	per-vehicle		
San Francisco Maritime National Historical Park	California	$15	per-person		
**Sequoia National Park**	California	$35	per-vehicle		passes valid at Kings Canyon National Park
Whiskeytown National Recreation Area	California	$25	per-vehicle		
**Yosemite National Park**	California	$35	per-vehicle		
Bent's Old Fort National Historic Site	Colorado	$10	per-person		
**Black Canyon of the Gunnison National Park**	Colorado	$25	per-vehicle		
Colorado National Monument	Colorado	$25	per-vehicle		
Dinosaur National Monument	Colorado	$25	per-vehicle		
Dinosaur National Monument	Utah	$25	per-vehicle		
Florissant Fossil Beds National Monument	Colorado	$10	per-person		
**Great Sand Dunes National Park and Preserve**	Colorado	$25	per-vehicle		
**Mesa Verde National Park**	Colorado	$30	per-vehicle		fees are reduced during the winter season
**Rocky Mountain National Park**	Colorado	$25	per-vehicle		
Canaveral National Seashore	Florida	$20	per-vehicle		
Castillo de San Marcos National Monument	Florida	$15	per-person		
**Dry Tortugas National Park**	Florida	$15	per-person		
**Everglades National Park**	Florida	$30	per-vehicle		
Gulf Islands National Seashore	Florida	$25	per-vehicle		
Gulf Islands National Seashore	Mississippi	$25	per-vehicle		
Chattahoochee River National Recreation Area	Georgia	$5	per-vehicle		
Chickamauga and Chattanooga National Military Park	Georgia	$10	per-person		fees only required for visiting Point Park at Lookout Mountain battlefield
Chickamauga and Chattanooga National Military Park	Tennessee	$10	per-person		fees only required for visiting Point Park at Lookout Mountain battlefield
Cumberland Island National Seashore	Georgia	$10	per-person		
Fort Pulaski National Monument	Georgia	$10	per-person		
Kennesaw Mountain National Battlefield Park	Georgia	$5	per-vehicle		daily fee
**Haleakala National Park**	Hawaii	$30	per-vehicle		
**Hawaii Volcanoes National Park**	Hawaii	$30	per-vehicle		
Pu'uhonua O Honaunau National Historical Park	Hawaii	$20	per-vehicle		
Craters of the Moon National Monument	Idaho	$20	per-vehicle		
Poverty Point National Monument	Louisiana	$4	per-person		daily fee; monument and fees administered by Louisiana state parks
**Acadia National Park**	Maine	$30	per-vehicle		
Antietam National Battlefield	Maryland	$10	per-person		3-day pass; $20 per-vehicle pass available (3-day pass)
Assateague Island National Seashore	Maryland	$25	per-vehicle		7-day pass; daily $10 per-vehicle pass available for Virginia district. Passes valid for entrance to Chincoteague National Wildlife Refuge
Assateague Island National Seashore	Virginia	$25	per-vehicle		7-day pass; daily $10 per-vehicle pass available for Virginia district. Passes valid for entrance to Chincoteague National Wildlife Refuge
C & O Canal National Historical Park	Maryland	$20	per-vehicle		passes required only for Great Falls Tavern area; passes valid at Great Falls Park
C & O Canal National Historical Park	Washington D.C.	$20	per-vehicle		passes required only for Great Falls Tavern area; passes valid at Great Falls Park
Fort McHenry National Monument and Historic Shrine	Maryland	$15	per-person		
Adams National Historical Park	Massachusetts	$15	per-person		
Cape Cod National Seashore	Massachusetts	$25	per-vehicle		
**Isle Royale National Park**	Michigan	$7	per-person		daily fee
Sleeping Bear Dunes National Lakeshore	Michigan	$25	per-vehicle		
Vicksburg National Military Park	Mississippi	$20	per-vehicle		
Vicksburg National Military Park	Louisiana	$20	per-vehicle		
**Gateway Arch National Park**	Missouri	$3	per-person		daily pass; tickets for tram to top of arch separate
Wilson's Creek National Battlefield	Missouri	$20	per-vehicle		fees currently waived and some venues closed due to the COVID-19 pandemic
**Glacier National Park**	Montana	$35	per-vehicle		reduced fees during the winter season
Little Bighorn Battlefield National Monument	Montana	$25	per-vehicle		
Lake Mead National Recreation Area	Nevada	$25	per-vehicle		
Lake Mead National Recreation Area	Arizona	$25	per-vehicle		
Saint-Gaudens National Historical Park	New Hampshire	$10	per-person		fees currently waived and some venues closed due to the COVID-19 pandemic
Thomas Edison National Historical Park	New Jersey	$15	per-person		
Bandelier National Monument	New Mexico	$25	per-vehicle		
Capulin Volcano National Monument	New Mexico	$20	per-vehicle		
**Carlsbad Caverns National Park**	New Mexico	$15	per-person		3-day pass
Chaco Culture National Historical Park	New Mexico	$25	per-vehicle		
Valles Caldera National Preserve	New Mexico	$25	per-vehicle		fees currently waived
**White Sands National Park**	New Mexico	$25	per-vehicle		
Home of Franklin D. Roosevelt National Historic Site	New York	$20	per-person		2-day pass; passes required only for the house and presidential library. Top Cottage requires a separate $10 fee per-person.
Sagamore Hill National Historic Site	New York	$10	per-person		fee applies only for Theodore Roosevelt Home tour
Statue of Liberty National Monument	New York	$19.25	per-person		children 4–12 years, $9; seniors 62+ years $14; fee includes ferry ticket and pedestal access, crown tickets additional fee and require reservation
Statue of Liberty National Monument	New Jersey	$19.25	per-person		children 4–12 years, $9; seniors 62+ years $14; fee includes ferry ticket and pedestal access, crown tickets additional fee and require reservation
Theodore Roosevelt Inaugural National Historic Site	New York	$12	per-person		youth 6-18, $7; seniors 62+, college students, and veterans, $9
Vanderbilt Mansion National Historic Site	New York	$10	per-person		fee for mansion entry only, gardens and grounds free
Wright Brothers National Memorial	North Carolina	$10	per-person		
**Theodore Roosevelt National Park**	North Dakota	$30	per-vehicle		
First Ladies National Historic Site	Ohio	$7	per-person		children under 18, $5; seniors, $6; America the Beautiful Pass holders, $4
James A. Garfield National Historic Site	Ohio	$10	per-person		
Perry's Victory and International Peace Memorial	Ohio	$10	per-person		fees for memorial and observation deck only; these are currently closed due to the COVID-19 pandemic.
**Crater Lake National Park**	Oregon	$30	per-vehicle		reduced fees during the winter season
Lewis and Clark National Historical Park	Oregon	$10	per-person		fee applies only to Fort Clatsop, separate fees apply to state park units
Lewis and Clark National Historical Park	Washington	$10	per-person		fee applies only to Fort Clatsop, separate fees apply to state park units
San Juan National Historic Site	Puerto Rico	$10	per-person		daily fee
Fort Sumter and Fort Moultrie National Historical Park	South Carolina	$10	per-person		fees for Fort Moultrie only; Fort Sumter is free to enter but generally requires a paid ferry fare to reach
**Badlands National Park**	South Dakota	$30	per-vehicle		
**Big Bend National Park**	Texas	$30	per-vehicle		
Fort Davis National Historic Site	Texas	$20	per-vehicle		
**Guadalupe Mountains National Park**	Texas	$10	per-person		
Padre Island National Seashore	Texas	$10	per-vehicle		daily pass; 7-day vehicle pass available for $25
**Arches National Park**	Utah	$30	per-vehicle		
**Bryce Canyon National Park**	Utah	$35	per-vehicle		
**Canyonlands National Park**	Utah	$30	per-vehicle		
**Capitol Reef National Park**	Utah	$20	per-vehicle		
Cedar Breaks National Monument	Utah	$10	per-person		
Golden Spike National Historical Park	Utah	$20	per-vehicle		
Natural Bridges National Monument	Utah	$20	per-vehicle		
**Zion National Park**	Utah	$35	per-vehicle		
Christiansted National Historic Site	Virgin Islands	$7	per-person		
Colonial National Historical Park	Virginia	$15	per-person		passes valid at Yorktown Battlefield and Historic Jamestown
Great Falls Park	Virginia	$20	per-vehicle		passes valid at Chesapeake and Ohio Canal National Historical Park
Prince William Forest Park	Virginia	$20	per-vehicle		
**Shenandoah National Park**	Virginia	$30	per-vehicle		
Fort Vancouver National Historic Site	Washington	$10	per-person		fee only for entry to reconstructed fort, free access to rest of grounds
Fort Vancouver National Historic Site	Oregon	$10	per-person		fee only for entry to reconstructed fort, free access to rest of grounds
**Mount Rainier National Park**	Washington	$30	per-vehicle		
**Olympic National Park**	Washington	$30	per-vehicle		
Harpers Ferry National Historical Park	West Virginia	$20	per-vehicle		
Devils Tower National Monument	Wyoming	$25	per-vehicle		
**Grand Teton National Park**	Wyoming	$35	per-vehicle		no fee stations at the north entrance, which is only accessible through Yellowstone National Park
**Yellowstone National Park**	Wyoming	$35	per-vehicle		
**Yellowstone National Park**	Idaho	$35	per-vehicle		
**Yellowstone National Park**	Montana	$35	per-vehicle		

== History ==
On October 24, 2017, Secretary of the Interior Zinke proposed large fee hikes at seventeen of the most visited national parks in order to address a backlog of maintenance at all national parks. The NPS considered that these changes, which would increase entrance fees from $25 to $75, were appropriate because they only targeted the most popular parks, which already have entrance fees. However, there was a nearly unanimous public backlash against this proposal; many families felt this would prohibit them from being able to visit the parks.

Further, there was concern that this hike would disproportionately affect low-income families, who are already underrepresented in visitation to national parks. Additionally, many organizations working to increase access to nature for families of color, such as Latino Outdoors and African American Nature and Parks Experience, spoke out against these proposed fee hikes.

Altogether, more than 110,000 comments were posted on the NPS website, with 98% of them protesting this change. Representative Raul Grijalva commented, “This is a prime example that activism works.” In response to this strong public reaction, on April 12, 2018, Secretary Zinke released a statement replacing this plan with a more moderate proposal to raise prices incrementally across all parks with entrance fees.

=== Cashless ===
In an effort to save on cash processing and hand handling fees, 22 national parks have gone cashless as of 2023. In September 2023, U.S. Senator Cynthia Lummis (R-WY) proposed the "Protecting Access to Recreation with Cash Act" (PARC) which would require national parks to accept cash as a form of payment for entrance fee. In April 2024, several NPS visitors sued seeking to restore cash as a payment form noting how cash is legal tender suitable "for all public charges" and that the "additional processing fees that will be borne by NPS and by visitors who ultimately fund the federal government through taxes, in addition to personal surcharges and bank fees visitors may incur under NPS cashless policy."

== See also ==
- List of the United States National Park System official units
