= Big4 Holiday Parks =

Australian caravan park chain

BIG4 Holiday Parks of Australia
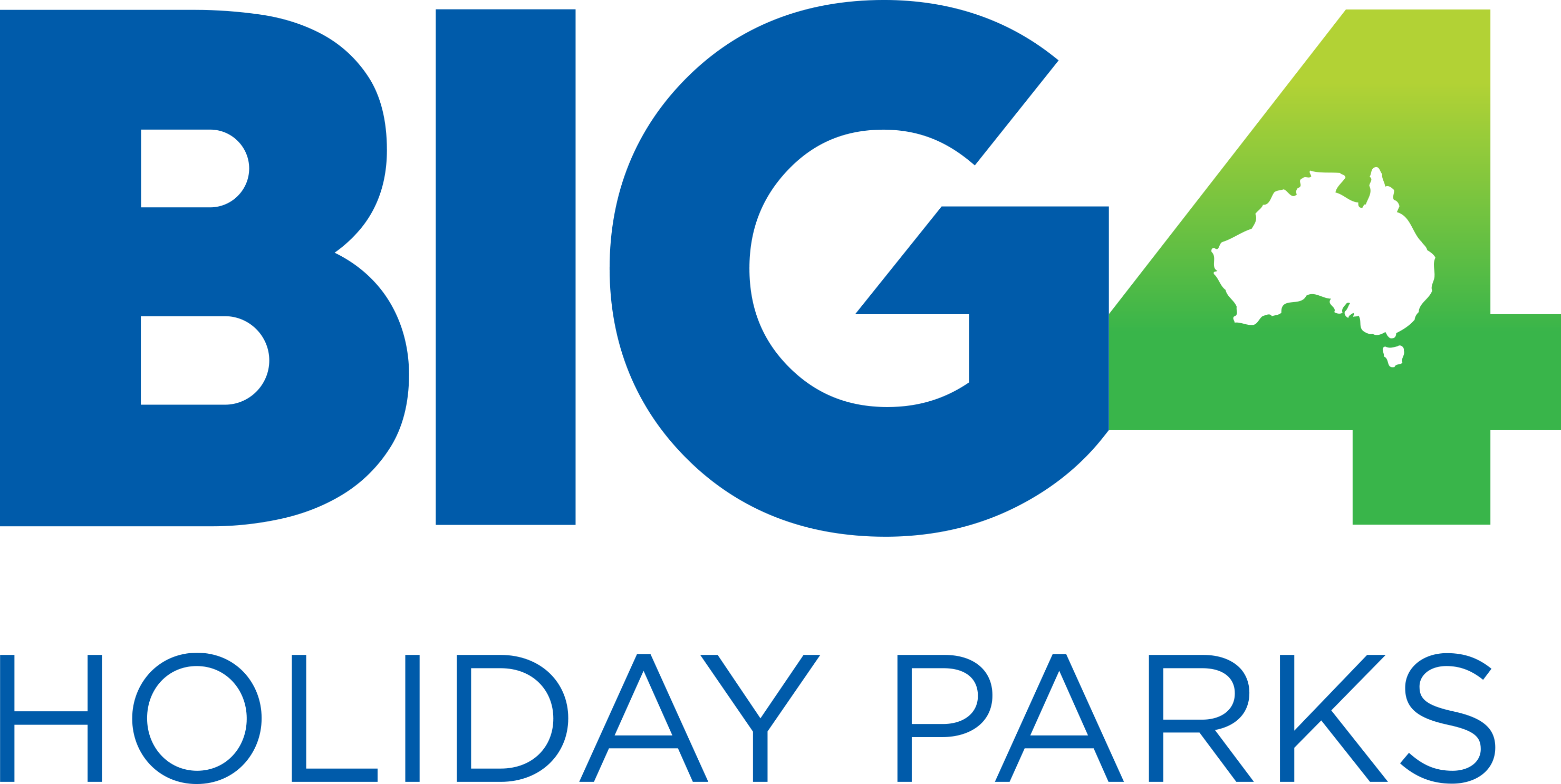

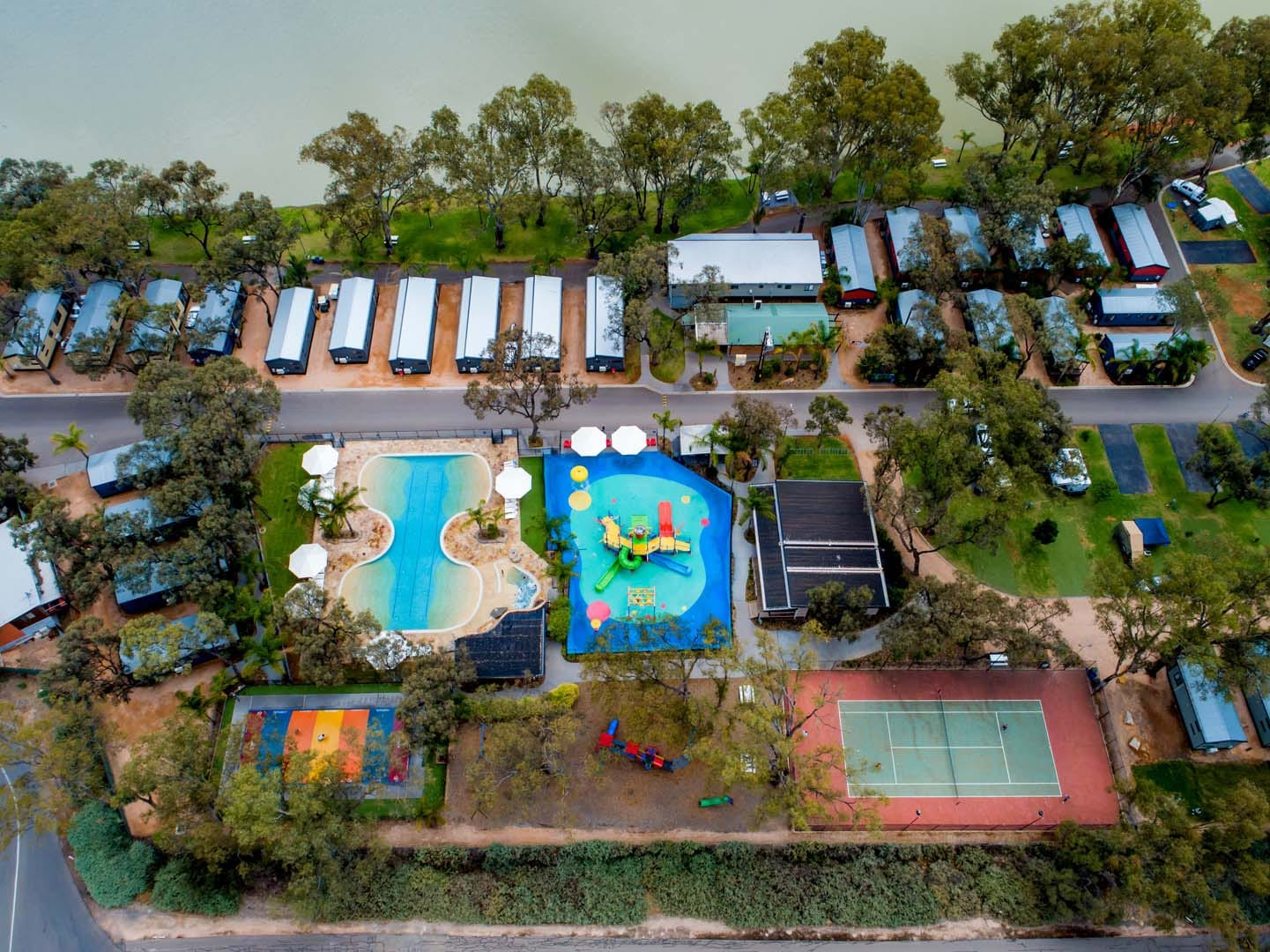
- Big4 Renmark Riverfront Holiday Park
- Type: Marketing cooperative
- Industry: Holiday parks
- Founded: 1979; 47 years ago
- Headquarters: Melbourne, Australia
- Area served: Australia
- Website: big4.com.au

Big4 Holiday Parks (stylised as BIG4) is an Australian network of holiday parks founded in 1979. Headquartered in Melbourne, it has over 300 locations across the country.

== Parks ==
As of 2025, there are over 300 holiday parks across Australia listed on Big4's website. From their first few decades, their caravan parks have evolved into holiday parks with a range of accommodation styles, including cabins and campgrounds, and resort-like facilities such as pools, gardens, playgrounds, splash parks, games rooms, and villas. In recent years, their glamping tents have proven popular.

Big4 Holiday Parks has operated in Australia since 1979, providing accommodation for domestic and international tourism. The company is a significant operator in the Australian holiday park industry, having evolved the traditional caravan park model into a contemporary holiday park experience. The network comprises 301 parks across Australia, categorised as Classic, Holiday, Premier, and Partner parks. As of recent data, distribution includes 105 parks in New South Wales, 57 in Queensland, 72 in Victoria, 29 in Western Australia, 21 in South Australia, 11 in Tasmania, and 6 in the Northern Territory.

Accommodation options at Big4 parks typically include sites for caravans and camping (which may feature glamping facilities), as well as various types of self-contained cabins. These are complemented by a range of on-site facilities and amenities, often featuring family-friendly activities such as splash pools, jumping pillows and playgrounds. Some parks offer specific amenities such as designated areas for campfires.

Big4 also operates a membership program, "Big4 Holiday Perks+," which offers discounts on accommodation and access to member-exclusive deals and offers. The organisation provides resources for travellers, including guides for local attractions, travel tips, and information on road trips. Selected Big4 parks offer pet-friendly accommodation.

== History ==
Big4 was borne out of the partnership of four independent caravan park owners in Ballarat, Victoria in 1979. One co-founder, Desmond Watts, was awarded an OAM in 2020 for his service to the tourism accommodation sector. Big4 became a successful franchise. In 2002, its 166 locations garnered $2.1 million in operating revenues in 2002, up from 61% in 2000.

The Wiggles wrote a song for Big4 as part of the companies’ major partnership.

== See also ==
- Membership campground
