= Teardrop trailer =

Type of caravan

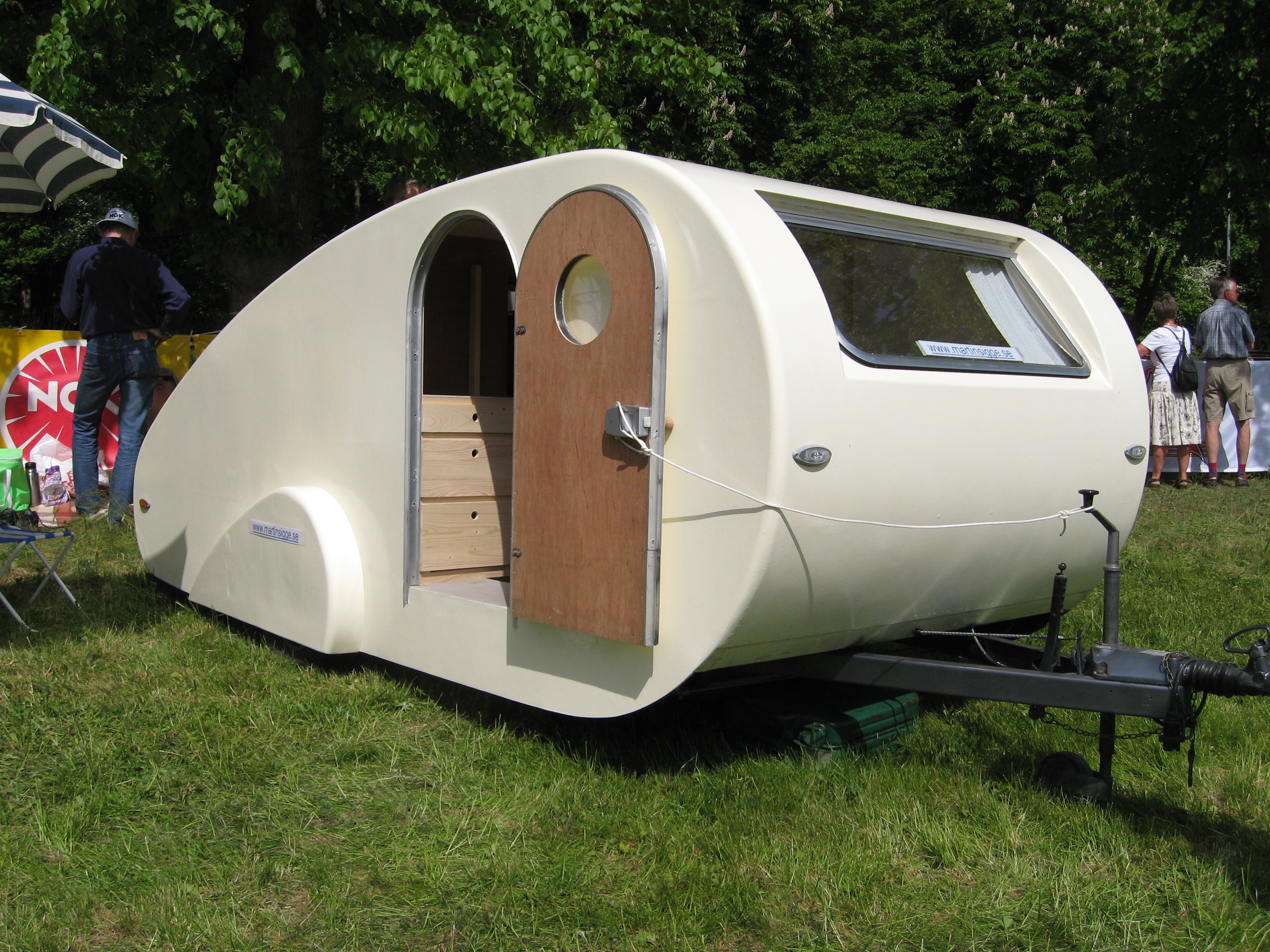
A parked teardrop trailer

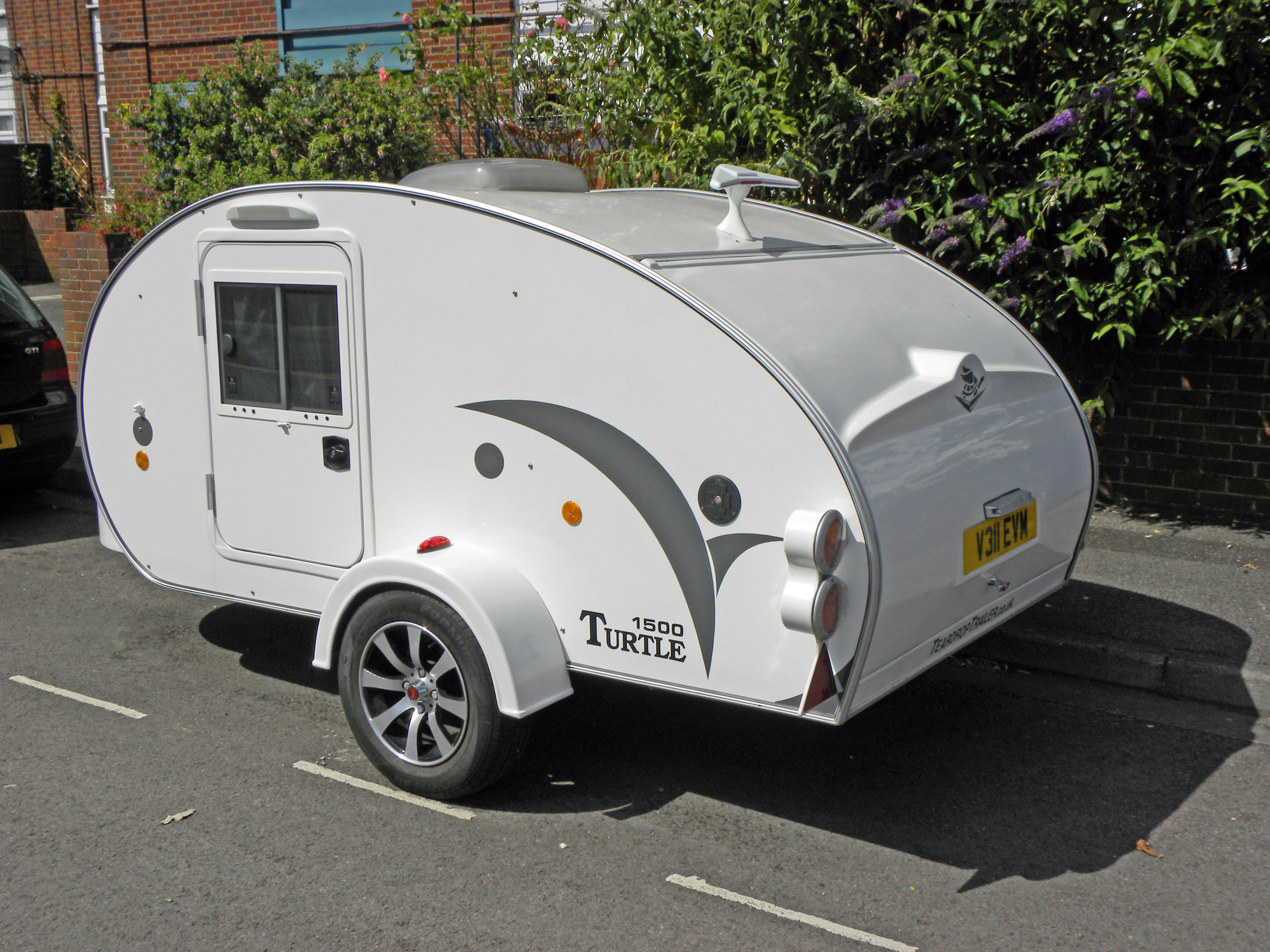
A modern teardrop trailer.

A teardrop trailer, also known as a teardrop camper trailer, is a streamlined, compact, lightweight caravan, which gets its name from its teardrop profile. They usually only have sleeping space for two adults and often have a basic kitchen in the rear.

Teardrop trailers first became popular in the 1930s, when magazines such as Mechanix Illustrated published DIY construction plans. The first teardrop designs incorporated standard 4 by 8 feet (1.22 by 2.44 m) sheets of plywood with hardwood spars. Teardrop trailers remained popular until the mid-1960s, after which they disappeared from mainstream camping. However, in the late 1990s, plans became available on the Internet and in recent years teardrop trailers have made a resurgence and are again growing in popularity.

A teardrop trailer is generally small, ranging from 4 feet (1.22 m) to 6 feet (1.83 m) in width and 8 feet (2.44 m) to 10 feet (3.05 m) in length. They are usually 4 feet (1.22 m) to 5 feet (1.52 m) in height. Wheels and tires are usually outside the body and are covered by fenders. Since teardrop trailers are so light, usually less than 1,000 pounds (450 kg), just about any car can tow one and fuel consumption is minimally affected.

There is room inside a teardrop trailer for two people to sleep, as well as storage for clothes and other items. Outside, in the rear under a hatch, there is usually a galley for cooking. Teardrop trailers tend to have lighting and other electrical power supplied by a storage battery, although some have mains power hookups like regular travel trailers.

Teardrop trailers are featured in California's Gold Episode 6001 with Huell Howser.
