= Caravan and Motorhome Club =

Tourism in the United Kingdom

- Formation: 14 June 1907
- Headquarters: East Grinstead House
- Location: East Grinstead, West Sussex, RH19 1UA
- Region served: British Isles
- Official language: English
- President: Viscount Coke
- Main organ: The Club Council
- Affiliations: FIA
- Staff: 900
- Website: www.caravanclub.co.uk

The Caravan and Motorhome Club is an organisation representing caravan and motorhome users in the United Kingdom and Ireland. It was founded in 1907 and now represents nearly one million members (caravanners, motorhomers and campervanners).

== History ==
Caravan Club logo used until 2017.

The Club was founded in 1907 as The Caravan Club of Great Britain and Ireland. Its aim was to "... bring together those interested in van life as a pastime...to improve and supply suitable vans and other appliances...to develop the pastime by collecting, publishing and supplying to members, books and periodicals and lists of camp sites etc... to arrange camping grounds...".

The Club was renamed as The Caravan Club in 1959 and celebrated its centenary on 14 June 2007. The club's current name, the Caravan and Motorhome Club was adopted in February 2017.

== Structure ==
The Caravan Club is a membership organisation. The Club is led by the Executive Committee, which airs policy issues with the Club Council. The council in turn is supported by the 10 Regional Councils. Their aim of the Regional Councils is to coordinate communications throughout The Club membership. Regional Councils provide a forum to discuss Club issues and to solve local and regional problems. Club members may also vote at the Annual Members Meeting.

The Club is a member of the Fédération Internationale de l'Automobile (FIA), an organisation that represents the interests of motoring organisations and motor car users.

The Club has over 900 staff and an annual turnover of over £100 million.

The Caravan and Motorhome Club represents nearly one million tourers.

== Sites ==
The Club operates around 200 main Caravan Club sites and over 2,200 smaller certificated "five-van" sites, known as CLs (certificated locations).

=== Certificated locations (CLs) ===
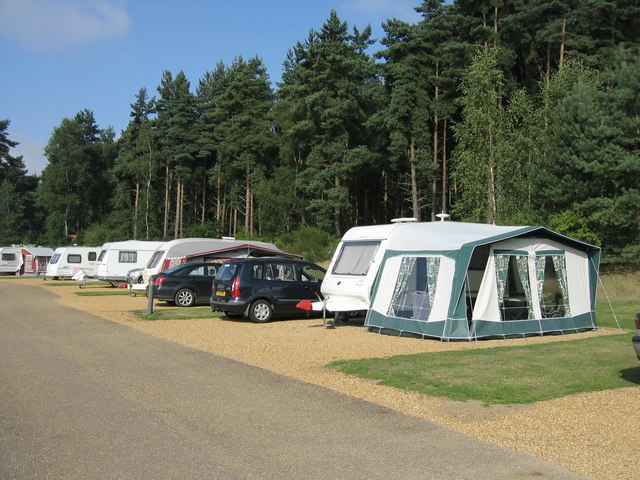
The Caravan And Motorhome Club site, the Sandringham estate

A certificated location (or 'CL') is an informal privately owned caravan site for up to 5 caravans in the United Kingdom. Visitors with caravans pay a small fee to the CL owner in order to pitch overnight. This is usually cheaper than larger commercial caravan sites. There are over 2200 CLs in the UK and they are for exclusive use by Caravan And Motorhome Club members. Each year the Caravan And Motorhome Club issues a certificate to those sites that continue to meet their standards, hence 'certificated locations'. Caravan And Motorhome Club members vote annually for the best CL in the 'CL of the Year' competition.

Most CLs are in the countryside, they are individually owned and can be on a farm or smallholding, on spare land next to a pub, golf course or hotel or on land attached to the owner's house. CLs need no site licence or formal planning permission, but are covered by two Acts of Parliament:

- Caravan Sites and Control of Development Act 1960 and
- Caravans Act (Northern Ireland) (1963) Chapter 17.

The laws state that visitors with caravans must be members of The Caravan And Motorhome Club, who are required to act responsibly and to observe the Country Code and no more than 5 caravans may be accommodated on the site at any one time. Caravans may not stay for more than 28 days per visit and must be occupied overnight. CLs are for recreational purposes and only touring caravans, motor caravans or trailer tents are permitted – tents are not permitted, other than attached caravan awnings, toilet tents or small pup tents; and permanently sited (static) caravans are not permitted on the same landholding.

There are also a number of guidelines stated. For example, CLs should be fairly level and have at least ½ acre of land; and have safe access for caravans including 12 ft wide gateway and safe approach road. If the landowner has a caravan site licence from their Local Authority, the Caravan And Motorhome Club is unlikely to issue a Certificate, unless the CL is entirely separate from the landowner's other business activities.

To become a CL, owners should provide an emptying point for chemical closets; a safe drinking water supply; A bin for dry rubbish; and public liability insurance cover. Some owners provide optional extras such as electrical hook ups, showers and toilets. Although exempt from planning permission, CL owners are liable to pay business rates and income tax on their profits.

== The National ==
Each year, the club holds a "National Rally" over the Spring Bank holiday at the end of May. The rally usually taking place in the grounds of a stately home and can attract up to 10,000 caravanners at a time.

The first National Rally was held at Leamington Spa in 1936 and attracting 100 caravans. In 2007, for the Club's Centenary year, the 80th National Rally was held in the grounds of Blenheim Palace, Oxfordshire from Friday 25th to Tuesday 29 May.

== Other services ==
The club offers a variety of other services with the intention of supporting and improving the lifestyle and holidays of its members. They offer a variety of insurance products including caravan, motorhome, car, breakdown, holiday, home and pet coverage.

They also provide overseas ferry and pitch bookings for members looking to holiday overseas, as well as technical advice.

The club is also active in lobbying on behalf of its members.

== Alliances ==
The Caravan Club has developed alliances with a number of groups:

- Haven Holidays offers Club members an exclusive deal at 21 of their Touring Parks.
- National Cycle Network (co-ordinated by Sustrans) offers 12,000 miles of signed cycle routes throughout the UK. More than half of all Club Sites are situated near cycle routes.
- RSPB – The Club is the Species Champion of the song thrush, and sponsors the RSPB’s protection of the bird.
- Highways Agency – The Club has signed a Memorandum of Understanding with the Highways Agency.

== See also ==
- Camping and Caravanning Club
- Caravan parks
- Membership campground
