= Membership campground =

Campsite restricted to members

A membership campground is a campground or RV park or network of campgrounds and parks whose facilities are restricted to members. The members typically pay a substantial one-time or ongoing membership fee, separate from any per-night charges, for the right of access.

== Membership campgrounds in North America ==
In North America, there are two main business models for membership campgrounds:

- Direct-ownership networks: One company owns or operates the campgrounds and sells memberships directly to customers
- Reciprocal or affiliate networks: Independent, privately owned campgrounds each sell memberships to their own campground (as a "home" resort), and that membership also provides reciprocal access to the other campgrounds in the network.

=== Direct-ownership networks ===
With this model, the company is primarily centered around property it owns, and sometimes they have an affiliate or discount layer layered on top of that.

The membership contracts for these networks are structurally similar to right-to-use (non-deeded) timeshares, rather than deeded timeshares: the membership is a contract granting use rights, not a recorded real-property interest. As such it cannot generally be willed or sold as real estate (though it may be transferable per the contract, often for a fee), and the member does not pay property tax directly. If the operating company becomes insolvent, membership rights (being contractual rather than a property interest) are at greater risk than a deeded interest would be.

Examples of direct-ownership networks are:

- Colorado River Adventures (CRA) owns ten camping resorts in Arizona, California, and Mexico.
- Encore RV Resorts has more than 130 locations, and Thousand Trails has 80 locations. Both Encore and Thousand Trails have an affiliate layer with each other so that members of one may optionally have reciprocal use of campgrounds in both, and are optionally bundled with the Resort Parks International (RPI) reciprocal network. Encore, Thousand Trails, and RPI are owned by Equity LifeStyle Properties.
- Holiday Trails Resorts owns three locations in British Columbia, with a maximum number of nights per year, instead of a maximum length of stay per visit. They have reciprocal agreements with two host parks in Alberta.
- Ocean Canyon Resorts owns six locations (in Alabama, Louisiana, Missouri, and Texas), and they also have a rotating list of individual guest-exchange agreements with several other campgrounds for limited access.
- Outdoor Adventures, Inc. owns five resorts in Michigan and New York and they have an affiliate layer with Venture Out Resorts. Ocean Canyon Resorts and Outdoor Adventures, Inc. are both owned by American Adventure Holdings (AAH), an investment holding company.
- Travel Resorts of America (TRA) owns and operates a small system of eleven campgrounds in the Midwest and East Coast, and they have an affiliate layer with Coast to Coast RV Resorts.

=== Reciprocal or affiliate networks ===
With this model, the company does not own property; the business is purely a reciprocal or affiliate network. Individual campgrounds may participate in multiple reciprocal programs.

Membership campground contracts for these networks are similar to a timeshare exchange company: the customer has a membership at the "home" campground and also access to an exchange system. If the reciprocal network (the exchange system) collapses, the customer continues to have a membership contract with the "home" campground but reciprocal access would disappear.

Examples are:

- Coast to Coast RV Resorts: A network of privately-owned campgrounds with an affiliate program: members join a home resort in the network, and then get access to other affiliated campgrounds. This is run by Good Sam Enterprises, which also owns Good Sam Club and Camping World.
- Resorts of Distinction (ROD): A not-for-profit association with about 100 affiliated resorts; they also offer a bundle with the North America Camping Club (NACC) discount club
- Resort Parks International (RPI): A network of camps in the US and Canada that's often sold as an add-on bundle with other memberships such as Thousand Trails. Like Thousand Trails and Encore RV Resorts, RPI's parent company is Equity LifeStyle Properties.

=== Other adjacent business models ===
There are several other types of business models that are often discussed together with membership campgrounds because they serve the same purposes to the same people, but they are slightly different.

==== Deeded ownership ====
A similar private campground option is deeded ownership. This model is not membership-based: people buy the actual title to real property—often a specific RV site or pad at a campground and usually also pay property tax and maintenance dues for shared amenities like swimming pools or roads. Unlike true membership campgrounds, if the operating company goes bankrupt, the property deed itself survives. Outdoor Resorts of America (ORA) was a corporate entity that developed several deeded ownership communities, such as Outdoor Resorts at Orlando, Outdoor Resorts Gatlinburg, Outdoor Resort Palm Spring, Hilton Head Harbor, and Nettles Island. ORA itself is no longer the management company; when the individual lots were sold, control was turned over to the owners.

==== Community memberships ====
Escapees is a membership organization for full-time RVers that offers various services to members such as a mail-forwarding service. They also own a small nonprofit park system with several Rainbow parks and eleven SKP member-run co-ops that are now affiliated with Harvest Hosts. With the member-managed co-ops, people buy a leasehold (or, right to use) a designated lot until it is sold back to the cooperative, which is governed by an elected board. Another example of a community membership model is Family RV Association, an RV travel club with various services including one campground in Ohio.

==== Discount and affinity clubs ====
Discount clubs offer a percentage off stays at participating campgrounds, but there is no ownership or reciprocal-access structure. Examples of these clubs are:

- KOA Reward is a loyalty card that provides a discount and points that can be redeemed for further discounts
- North America Camping Club (NACC) is available as a standalone annual membership, and also is bundled with reciprocal or affiliate networks such as Resorts of Distinction (ROD)
- Passport America, with participating campgrounds in the US, Canada and Mexico

=== Legal status and consumer protection ===
Starting in the 1980s, newspapers started reporting on the growth of membership campgrounds and some of their pitfalls, comparing them with timeshares with high costs and high-pressure sales tactics. Over the years, membership campground companies have periodically failed, been absorbed by competitors, or drawn regulatory scrutiny, in some cases echoing those earlier comparisons. The resultant consumer complaints and legal actions have centered on a recurring set of issues: high-pressure sales tactics, memberships that were reassigned or devalued without the member's consent when a company or campground changed ownership, and difficulty in obtaining refunds or cancellations.

==== Contractual status of memberships: All Seasons Resorts, Inc. v. Abrams ====
In 1986, the New York Court of Appeals addressed whether membership campground contracts constituted "securities" subject to the state's Martin Act, deciding that the memberships in this case were licenses for recreational use, not investment contracts. They should not be sold as investments, and members should not be led to expect profits from their purchase of the membership. The ruling meant members have less legal protection than they would as securities purchasers, since campground memberships were not subject to the disclosure requirements the Martin Act imposes on investment products.

==== Membership terms after a change of ownership: Western Horizon Resorts and affiliated networks ====
Western Horizon Resorts, Inc. (WHR) was a direct-ownership network founded in Gunnison, Colorado in 1984. They grew through campground acquisition and also created their own reciprocal network named Sunbelt USA. At the same time, they also participated in the Coast to Coast reciprocal system, and were the largest camping chain there in 2000 when they acquired Adventure Outdoor Resorts (AOR), another reciprocal campground network. During the 2010s, WHR sold a number of the campgrounds they owned directly. When WHR sold their campgrounds, they also transferred existing memberships to the companies that bought the campgrounds. Members reported that their "home park" was suddenly reassigned without their consent, and that the expensive "no dues" or fixed-rate lifetime packages were no longer in place with the new contract owners. People who had spent thousands lost access to campgrounds they had paid substantial fees to use, and were left with memberships that had no resale value.

Adventure Outdoor Resorts continued to operate under separate ownership as Ultimate Camping Network, which in 2025 entered a partnership with RSI Vacations.

==== Consumer protection enforcement: New York Attorney General settlement (2018) ====
In July 2018, the New York Attorney General's office announced a settlement with three campground membership companies that shared common ownership, resolving allegations of deceptive marketing practices. The companies used misleading direct-mail solicitations with promises of free gifts to people who took sales tours, misrepresented the available amenities and reciprocal network access, and didn't honor valid membership cancellation requests. As part of the settlement, the companies had to pay consumer restitution and reform their practices.

== Outside North America ==
Commercial membership campgrounds primarily is an English-speaking world phenomenon that is most developed in the US, with variations in a few other countries.

The Caravan and Motorhome Club and Camping and Caravanning Club directly own and operate their sites, and members also have access to independently-owned "certificated" sites. However, there is no large upfront membership fee. Annual dues are modest and provide a discount (not free stay) at club-owned sites.

The CampingCard ACSI is a discount card for independent campsites across Europe.

In Australia, BIG4 Holiday Parks is a discount club but it is a marketing cooperative governed by the individual parks that provide the discounts. The park owners collectively own the brand and reservation system. Australia also has other discount programs that are not co-ops, such as G'Day Rewards, Family Parks, Kui Parks, and NRMA Parks and Resorts.

In South Africa, Caravan Club of Southern Africa (CCSA) and Trekkers Outdoor Recreation Club are both large and active caravanning clubs for RVers that organize group camping trips ("rallies") at independently-owned parks and resorts, and sometimes negotiate discounted rates, but these clubs are primarily social rather than commercial organizations.

== See also ==
- America the Beautiful Pass
- Harvest Hosts
