= Thousand Trails =

American membership campground company

- Industry: Membership campground
- Founded: 1969
- Founder: Milton Kuolt
- Headquarters: Chicago
- Parent: Equity LifeStyle Properties
- Website: thousandtrails.com

Thousand Trails is a membership campground company operating private trailer park and campground resorts (sometimes referred to as "preserves" in company parlance) in the United States and Canada. As of 2014, the company claimed to have more than 100,000 member families and guests, and over 80 locations in 22 states and the Canadian province of British Columbia. Members typically pay a one-time membership fee and annual dues to use Thousand Trails campgrounds, which tend to cater to the owners of recreational vehicles. Over the years, Thousand Trails has offered different types of memberships. Some memberships allow members to have longer continuous stays at a campground and grant access to a greater number of campgrounds.

== History ==
=== Under Milt Kuolt (1969–1981) and Jim Jensen (1981–1981) ===
The company was founded by Milt Kuolt in 1969 with one campground in Chehalis, Washington, officially opening in 1972. In 1979, Kuolt made Thousand Trails a publicly traded corporation. Kuolt would go on to found the airline Horizon Air, which he sold in 1986 to Alaska Airlines.

=== Part of USTrails (1991–2003) ===
In 1991, Thousand Trails and another membership campground company, NACO (National American Corporation), both came under the umbrella of the newly formed USTrails, Inc. (which took the name Thousand Trails, Inc., in 1996). Concurrent with this consolidation, USTrails filed for Chapter 11 bankruptcy in May 1991.

In 1999, Thousand Trails, Inc. purchased the holding company that owned Leisure Time Resorts of America, Inc., a network of ten membership campgrounds in Washington and Oregon. Since that time, ownership has changed repeatedly.

=== Part of Kohlberg & Co. (2003–2006) ===
The private equity firm of Kohlberg & Co. purchased Thousand Trails for $113 million in 2003.

Thousand Trails began a program in the mid-2000s known as "Club Blazer", an education initiative to teach children environmental protection and stewardship. The company publishes its own magazine, TrailBlazer.

=== Part of Privileged Access (2006–2008) ===
Privileged Access Gp. Corp. of Frisco, Texas, bought it in 2006.

=== Part of Equity LifeStyle Properties (2008–present) ===
Equity LifeStyle Properties bought it in 2008.

== Chehalis campground ==
The first resort, the Chehalis Thousand Trails location was first begun on 640 acres (260 ha) and by the late 1970s, contained a pool and lodge. As of 2007, the campground is part of a nature reserve and contains 3,000 camp sites, a 100 foot (30 metres) Slip 'N Slide, and an open area known as Roy Rogers' Field, named in honor of the company's first spokesperson.

== Press characterizations ==
In an article entitled "Newest RV Phenomenon has Campgrounds Going RSVP" in the November 28, 1980 edition of the Los Angeles Times, staff writer Ted Vollmer characterized "membership-only resort parks catering to recreational vehicle owners" as "either about the smartest investment or the most ridiculous scheme ever served up to the camping public- depending on who's doing the talking." The same report noted that, "Unlike time-sharing schemes involving resort-area condominiums, the campground site is never owned by the camper who buys into a membership park. This fact alone has prompted some private campground owners and campers to question the wisdom of signing up at fees as high as $7,000."

On June 22, 1986, the New York Times ran an article entitled "Campgrounds that Double as Clubs," explaining that "membership campgrounds tout themselves as destination resorts, where families can get away for a weekend or longer in an atmosphere that is a mixture of natural retreat and private country club." The same article reported that Thousand Trails, Inc., had revenues of $128 million the previous year. It also noted that "Like time-share resorts, many of the membership campgrounds do mass mailings to invite people to tour their facilities. The trade press has sharply criticized them for badgering prospective customers with high-pressure sales techniques, or offering nonexistent prizes in promotions."
