= Harvest Hosts =

American travel company

- Type: Private
- Industry: Travel
- Founded: 2009
- Founder: Don Greene; Kim Greene
- Number of locations: 9,695+ (2026)
- Members: 260,000+ (2024)
- Website: www.harvesthosts.com

Harvest Hosts is an American travel company. Founded in 2009, it offers a membership-based network of overnight parking locations for recreational vehicles (RVs).

== History ==
Harvest Hosts was founded by Don and Kim Greene in 2009 as a passion project. While they were traveling through France in an RV, they learned about the France Passion agritourism networks in Europe and wanted to bring it to the United States. The Greenes, beginning with locations in California, Oregon, and Washington, expanded the amount of hosts into nearly six hundred, including multiple locations in Canada and Mexico.

Joel Holland, founder of stock footage company Storyblocks, bought Harvest Hosts from the Greenes in May 2018. He had been burnt out from his previous enterprise and stepped down as Storyblocks' CEO in 2016. Holland initially fell in love with the concept of agritourism after visiting an alpaca farm in Kansas run by nuns. He initially thought of starting such a company from scratch, but decided to use Harvest Hosts' initial network as a base to build from. After taking over the company, Holland hired more employees and spent money on advertising on Google and Facebook, spending nearly $1 million monthly on the latter. Later in the year, Holland purchased RV Golf Club and absorbed its locations into Harvest Hosts.

During the early stages of the COVID-19 pandemic, the company's membership base doubled in size in six months, leading to a $37 million investment from Stripes. Its membership had previously multiplied tenfold in the period from 2018 to 2020. In July 2024, Harvest Hosts acquired Escapees RV Club's membership, events, and education operations. Escapees' mail forwarding service, its company-owned RV parks, and its 11 member-owned SKP co-op parks were explicitly excluded from the deal and remained under existing ownership and management.

In September 2026, Choice Hotels International announced an agreement to acquire Harvest Hosts from Stripes and other shareholders.

== Organization ==
Harvest Hosts offers a membership that connects campers with off-the-beaten-path overnight accommodations for free. While hosts do not get commission from the company, guests are encouraged to spend money at each hosts' location to support them. They are also required to bring self-contained vehicles, meaning that they must have a bathroom and place to sleep inside.

== See also ==
- Membership campground
