= Family Motor Coach Association =

Transportation association

The Family RV Association (FRVA), (formerly known as The Family Motor Coach Association (FMCA) is an international organization of families who own and enjoy the use of recreational vehicles.

Since 1963, FMCA has issued more than 500,000 memberships to families who look to the association as their source of information about all facets of RV ownership and travel. FMCA is a member-owned association that maintains its headquarters in Cincinnati, Ohio, United States, and employs a full-time office staff. FMCA is governed by volunteer officers who are elected from within the ranks of the association.

== Formation ==
On July 20, 1963, 26 families met at the Good Will-Hinckley School in Hinckley, Maine, United States, to socialize and become acquainted with other "house car" owners. They decided to form a motor coach owners' common interest group. A monument to commemorate the founding was dedicated at the school on July 4, 1994.

== Membership ==
Membership in FMCA is contingent upon ownership of a self-contained RV — a recreational vehicle that contains all the conveniences of a home, including cooking, sleeping, and permanent sanitary facilities. These can be original-manufacture RVs, or conversions from other types of vehicle, of which buses are the most common. Those contemplating purchasing an RV can join as Pathfinders and use the benefits of FMCA while they learn about the life and decide what RV best suits their needs.

In 2017, FMCA's members passed a historic vote. Previously, the club was open to motorhome owners only. Through the vote, the membership voted to expand the club's membership criteria.

FMCA has approximately 80,000 members from every state of the US as well as Canada, Mexico, Great Britain, and beyond. FMCA also has roughly 1,500 commercial members — dealers, suppliers, manufacturers, campgrounds, service facilities, and other firms servicing the RV owner or the RV industry. Most members are only occasional users, while others live in their RVs full-time.

== Code of Ethics ==
Every member of FMCA agrees to follow the Association's Code of Ethics, which requires members to comply with all federal, state, and local laws and regulations governing the ownership and use of RVs. The Code of Ethics also calls for members to be "good neighbors, careful and responsible RV owners and operators, and good citizens of our communities."

== Purpose ==
The purpose of FMCA is to organize social activities, exchange RVing information, and supply benefits made possible, in part, by collective purchasing. The group publishes Family RVing, a monthly magazine. It provides news concerning RV technology, the RV industry, and the association. FMCA members can be identified by the FMCA “goose egg," or membership emblem, displayed on their RV.

== Chapters and conventions ==
FMCA encourages the development of local, regional and specialty chapters. These chapters — FMCA has approximately 500 of them — organize events of particular interest to their members, including numerous rallies throughout the year. Regional rallies, composed of several chapters from a geographic area, are also held annually. Many FMCA chapters cover specific or general geographic areas. Others are dedicated to an RV brand, a hobby, or a special interest. For instance, special-interest chapters include golf, crafts, amateur radio, single RVers, and handicapped RVers. New chapters are being formed as interests change including Pickleball, off roading, and NASCAR to name a few.

FMCA holds two international RV conventions each year at various locations in the United States, in which manufacturers, dealers, and RV suppliers display their latest products. The events take place over a four-day period and usually attract 3,000 to 5,000 RVs. Seminars at these conventions cover topics such as living full time in your RV, boondocking and solar power, maintaining your RV, tracing your family roots, and cooking in a small space with a convection-microwave oven.

== See also ==
- Membership campground
