= Milton Kuolt =

American entrepreneur

- Born: Milton G. Kuolt II; 1927; India
- Died: May 30, 2008 (aged 80); Seattle, Washington, US
- Education: Central Washington University

Milton "Milt" G. Kuolt II was an American entrepreneur, who most notably founded Horizon Air, a Seattle-based regional airline. He also founded Thousand Trails, a chain of private membership campgrounds. He died on May 30, 2008, due to complications from emphysema.

== Early life and education ==
Kuolt, born in 1927 in India to Christian missionaries, relocated to the United States in 1940. He lived in Missouri and in Philadelphia, Pennsylvania, and was voted (in absentia) "Least likely to succeed" by his high school class. Due to failing grades, Kuolt enlisted in the U.S. Navy before graduating from high school. After serving in the Navy for 18 months, he returned home, enrolling at Central Washington University, then called Central Washington College of Education. He graduated from Central Washington College of Education with a degree in Economics in 1951.

== Career ==
=== The Boeing Company ===
Immediately after college graduation, Kuolt began to work at The Boeing Company. Shortly after beginning his career, Kuolt was promoted to a corporate facilities planning and layout position, eventually becoming a business planning manager for the 737 and 747 aircraft program. While at Boeing, he bought and sold real estate to supplement his income.

=== Thousand Trails ===
In 1969, after purchasing a 640-acre (260 ha) real estate investment, Kuolt founded Thousand Trails, the first private, members-only RV campground chain. The company's success led Kuolt to resign from Boeing and focus solely on Thousand Trails and other business ventures. Later, in 1981, Kuolt sold his ownership in Thousand Trails for $40 million. Today, the company owns over 80 private campgrounds nationwide and in British Columbia, Canada.

=== Horizon Air ===
In 1981, the same year that he sold Thousand Trails, Kuolt created Horizon Air. The airline, one of the first regional airlines in the United States, began service on September 1, 1981, from Yakima to Seattle using two Fairchild F27 aircraft. The airline began operation with 36 employees and went public three years later. In 1987, Horizon Air, which had grown to become the fifth-largest regional airline with service to over 30 cities, was purchased by Alaska Air Group for over $68 million.

=== Elkhorn Resort ===
in 1984, After leaving Horizon, Kuolt bought Elkhorn Resort, a struggling, 300-room property in Sun Valley, Idaho, to provide a destination to reward Horizon’s frequent fliers with golfing and skiing opportunities.
