= Camping and Caravanning Club =

United Kingdom camping organisation

The Camping and Caravanning Club
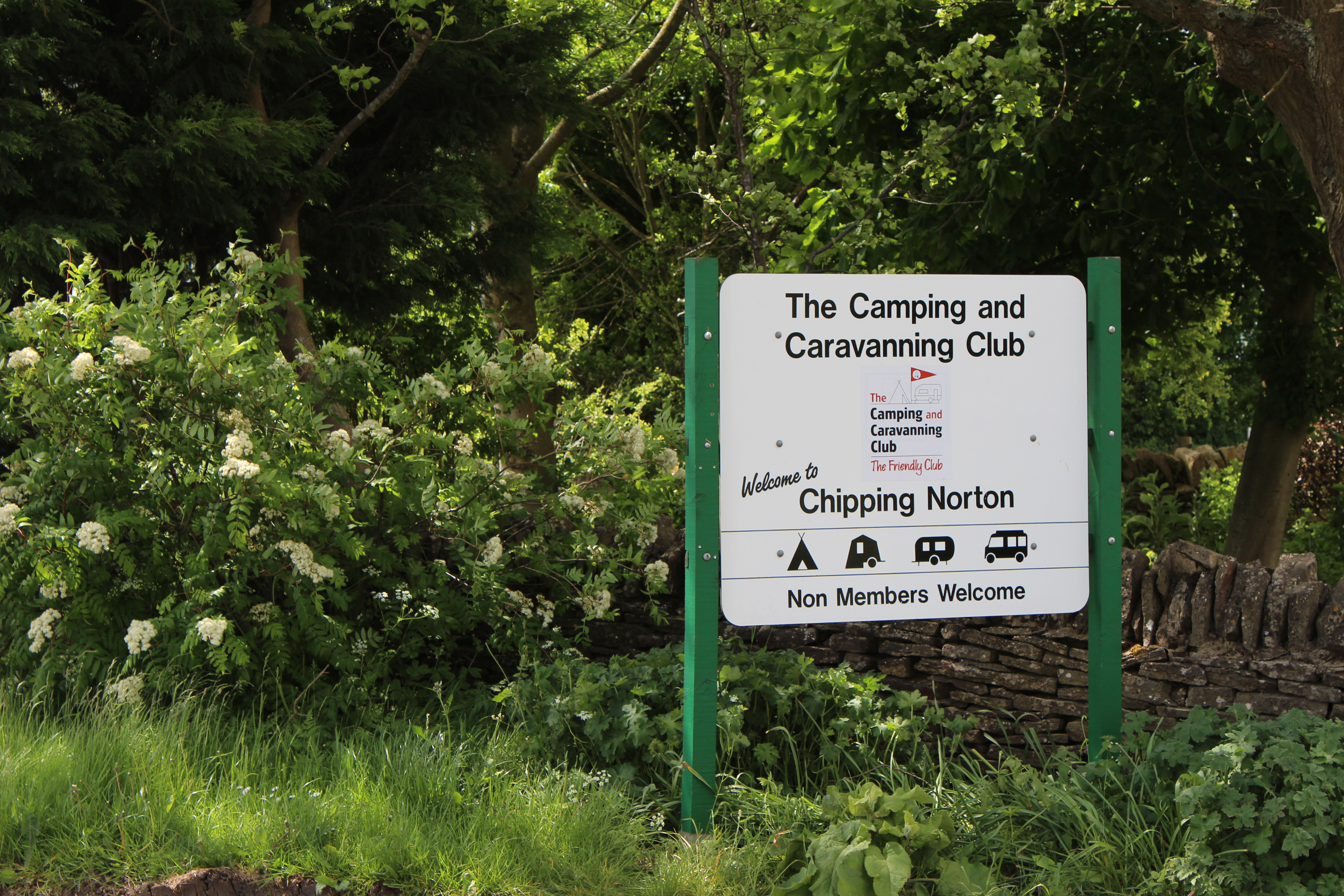
- Entrance to campsite, Chipping Norton
- Type: Not-for-profit
- Founded: 1901
- Headquarters: Greenfields House, Westwood Way, CV4 8JH, Coventry
- Area served: Global
- Key people: Hamza Yassin (President); Sabina Voysey (Director General); Darren Whittington (Deputy Director General)
- Website: www.campingandcaravanningclub.co.uk

The Camping and Caravanning Club is a not-for-profit membership organisation for camping and caravan enthusiasts in the United Kingdom. It was founded in 1901, and has over 730,000 members.

== History ==
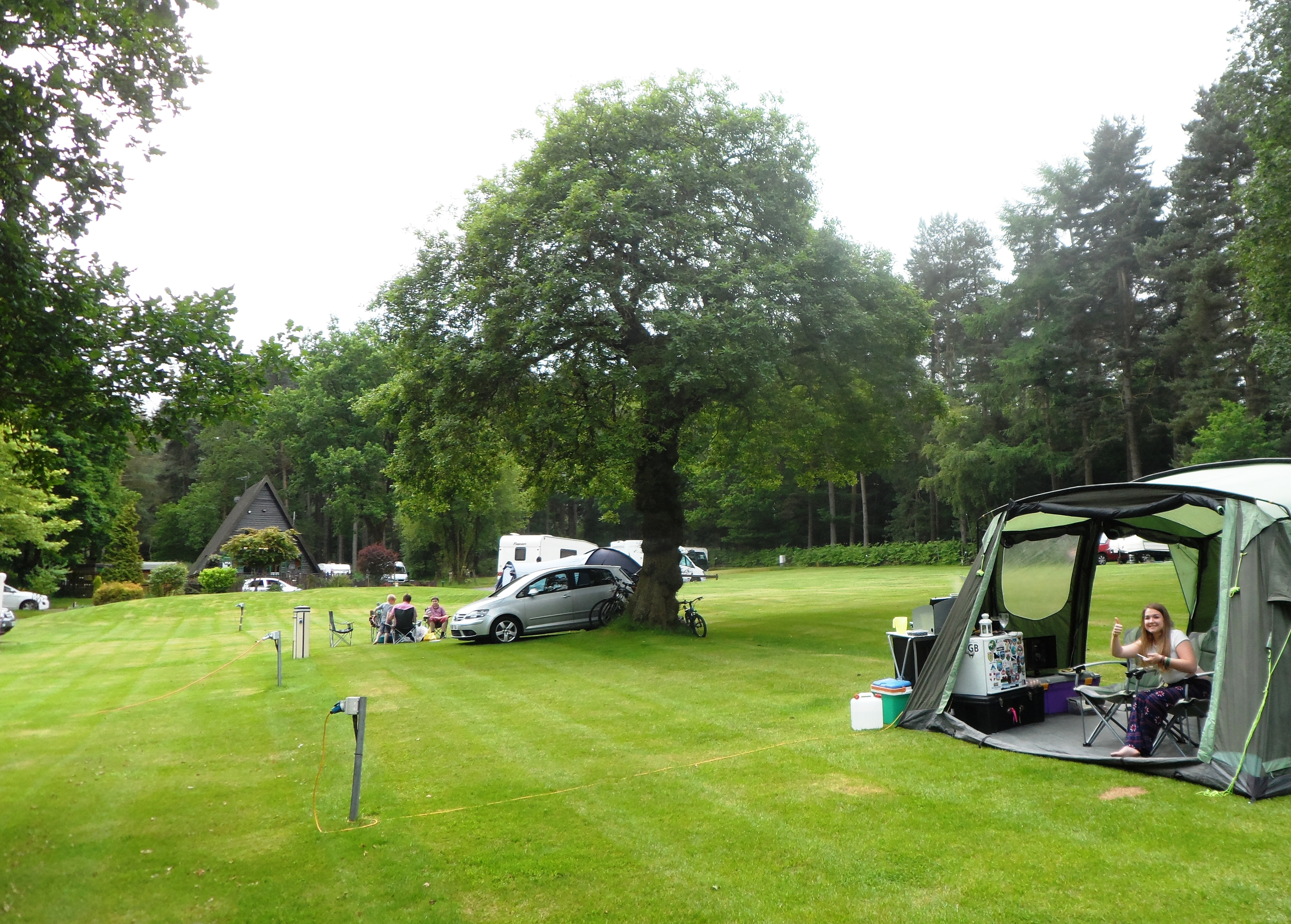
Camping pitches, Cannock Chase

The Camping and Caravanning Club was founded in 1901 as the Association of Cycle Campers. One of the club's founding members was Thomas Hiram Holding, who also founded the Bicycle Touring Club in 1878, which became the Cyclists' Touring Club, now renamed Cycling UK. Holding wrote The Campers Handbook in 1908 to share his enthusiasm for the great outdoors.

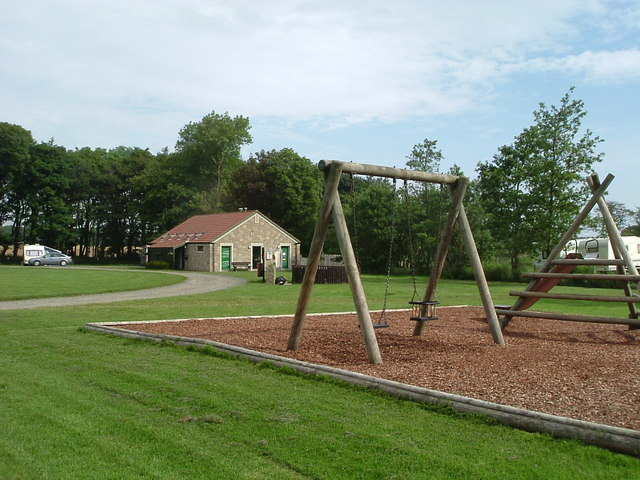
Campsite play area, Alnwick

In 1906, the association, now known as The Camping and Caravanning Club, opened its first camping site in Weybridge. By that time, the organisation had several hundred members. The club changed its name several more times, to the Amateur Camping Club (1909), The Camping Club of Great Britain and Ireland (1919), and The Camping and Caravanning Club Ltd. (1983).

Club membership rose to 100,000 by 1967, and to over 300,000 by 2000.

== Structure ==
The Camping and Caravanning Club is a not-for-profit membership organisation with over 600 staff and a turnover of more than £50 million. The club's governing body is the National Council, comprising 18 elected councillors, 15 appointed councillors, 7 section advisory officers, the chair of the National Youth Committee, and the honorary treasurer, a total of 42 individuals, all of whom are members. The club's five operational areas are headed by staff directors who report to the director-general, who in turn works closely with the club's executive committee and national council.

The club is split into 13 regions across the UK, each made up of a number of district associations (DAs). The role of the region is to support and promote communication between DAs. The club's special interest sections (including The Association of Lightweight Campers, British Caravanners Club, Canoe-Camping Club, The Walking and Cycling Section and The Folk Dance and Song Group) are also represented at regional level.

== Campsites ==
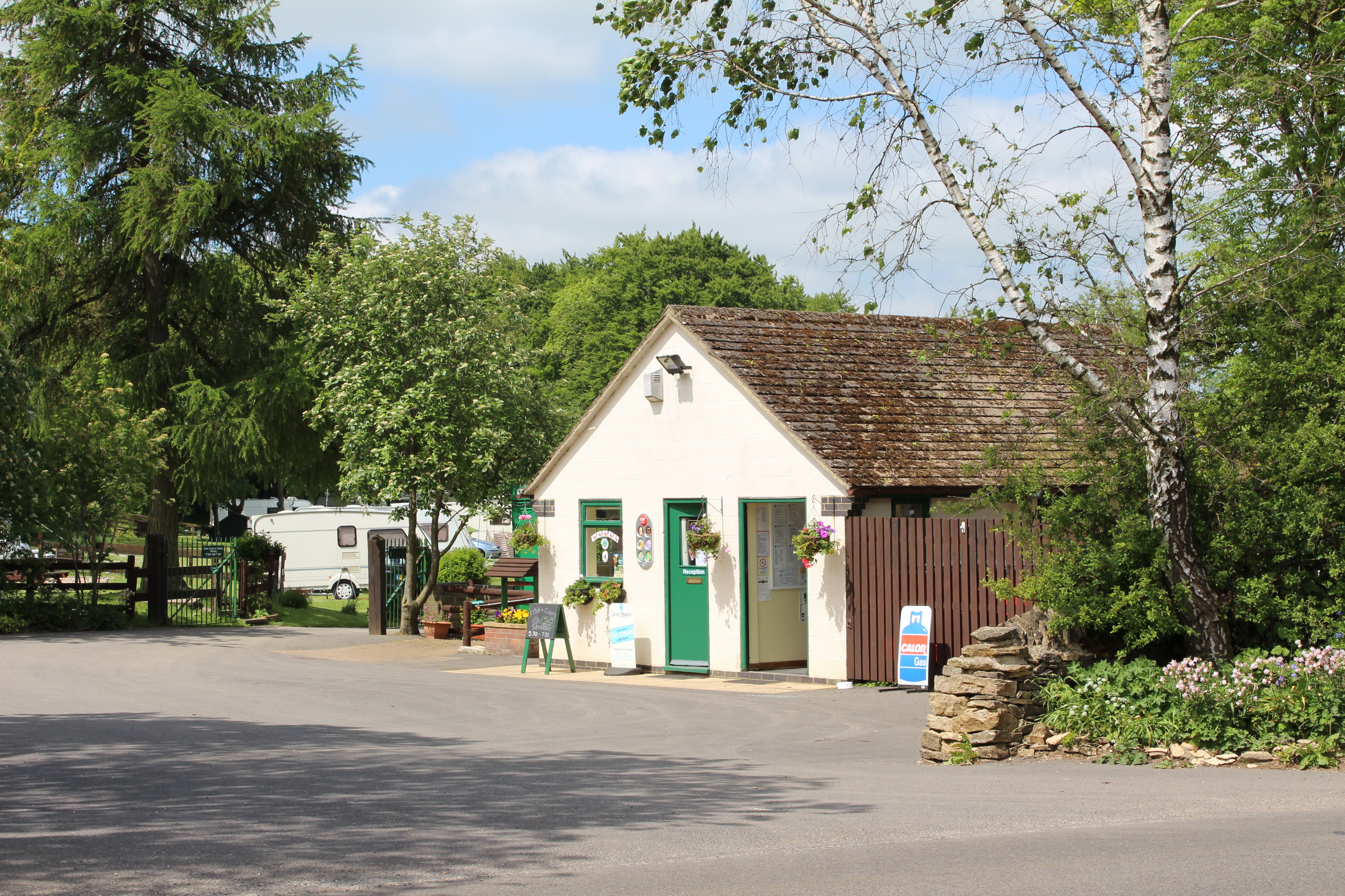
Campsite reception, Chipping Norton

The club operates nearly 100 club sites and over 1,100 certificated sites across the UK.

Certificated sites (CSs) are small campsites that can accommodate up to five caravans or motorhomes and up to ten tents at any one time. There are over 1,100 CSs across the UK; they are independently owned and open only to club members. The club is recognised as an "exempted organisation" by the Caravan Sites and Control of Development Act 1960, which allows the club to issue certificates to landowners, giving them permission to operate a small campsite on their land without specific planning permission.

== Notable presidents ==
- Hamza Yassin – current president
- Julia Bradbury – 2013–2023
- David Bellamy – 2001–2013
- Robert Crause Baden-Powell – 1992–2001
- Robert Baden-Powell – 1919–1941
- Robert Falcon Scott – 1909–1912

== See also ==
- Caravan and Motorhome Club
- Caravan parks
- Membership campground
