= Thomas Hiram Holding =

English tailor (1844–1930)

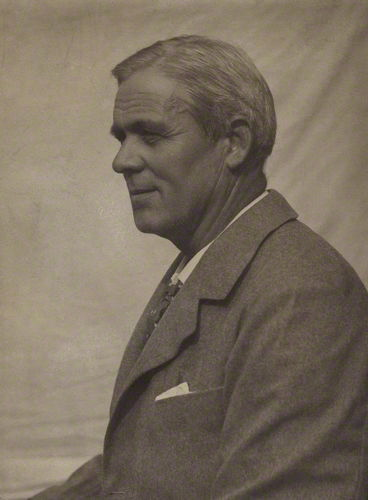
Thomas Hiram Holding

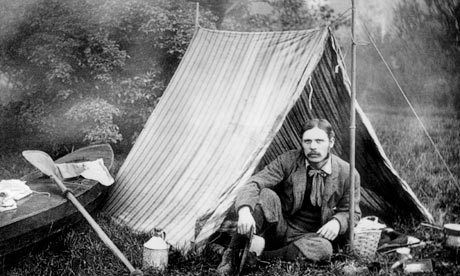
Outside his tent

Thomas Hiram Holding (c. 1844 – 1930) was an English tailor who is often considered the founder of modern camping. He wrote the first edition of The Camper's Handbook in 1908 and founded the Association of Cycle Campers, now the Camping and Caravanning Club.

His passion for camping developed as a child when he crossed the United States with his parents in a wagon train.

He was also passionate about sailing, designed his own sailing dinghies, and published Watery Wanderings 'mid Western Lochs. A practical canoe cruise in 1886.

In July 1897, at the age of 52, he designed and made a very small, lightweight tent which could be carried on a bicycle, and set off on a three-day cycle-camping tour in south-west Ireland with his son Frank and two friends, all of whom had spent much time together camping and sailing for many years. By December of that year, he had written Cycle and Camp detailing how the four made that pioneering journey and how this kind of holiday could be enjoyed by anyone for little cost.

Some of his published works on tailoring, advertised in the journal Tailor & Cutter in 1897, included: Ladies’ Garment Cutting; Breeches, Trousers, Vest, and Gaiter Cutting; Coat Cutting; Stout Cutting; Livery Cutting; Uniforms for all Services; Tailoring: How to Make it Pay; Alterations; Diagram Book; London Tailor, and Gentleman's Magazine.
