= Long travel suspension =

Vehicle component used in off road racing

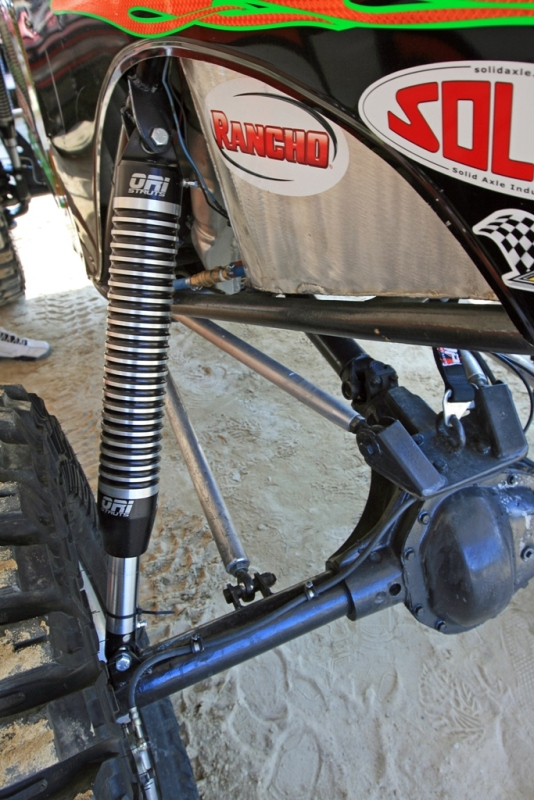
Long travel suspension on a rock racer

Long travel suspension is a type of vehicle suspension often used in off road racing. Vehicles such as dune buggies, baja racers, mountain bikes, adventure motorcycles, dirt bikes and rock crawlers use long travel suspension to dampen the effects of rough, off-road driving conditions. There is no definitive standard on what is considered long travel. Categories such as short travel, standard/stock travel, mid-travel and long travel have vague boundaries. Definitions vary depending on application and time period in history.

== Long travel suspension accessories ==
- Bump stops – Prevents suspension from bottoming out.
- Limit straps – Prevents shocks from extending all the way out.
- Sway bars – Stabilizes vehicle around hard turns.
- Coilover springs – Usually placed over the load-bearing struts, hence the name coilover.
