= Volunteers-In-Parks =

Volunteer program in US National Parks

The American National Park Service's Volunteers-In-Parks (VIP) program was authorized by Public Law 91-357 enacted in 1970. The purpose of the program is to provide a way through which the NPS can accept and utilize voluntary help in such a way that it is mutually beneficial to the NPS and volunteers. The push to establish the VIP program was led by NPS Director George B. Hartzog Jr. in the 1960s.

== Uniforms ==
Since the beginning of the VIP Program in the early 1970s, park superintendents could prescribe any volunteer uniform they wished, and that policies continues until today. The current policy on VIP uniforms, Director's Order 7, dated March 15, 2016, states the following:

VIPs should be readily identifiable as such, in a manner appropriate for their duties. VIP uniform items include the official VIP patch (shoulder or cap) and name tag. VIPs must not wear any part of the official NPS uniform or be dressed in a manner that attempts to duplicates its appearance.

=== Patches ===
==== VIP Patch, circa 1972–2006 ====
This patch was authorized for wear soon after the creation of the VIP Program and was included in uniform regulations for employees in 1973 and 1974. This design was used for over three decades, but it was likely changed due to its close resemblance to the Arrowhead Patch worn by employees. A new circular shaped patch was authorized for wear beginning in 2004, but parks had a two-year transition period.

==== VIP Patch, 2004–present ====
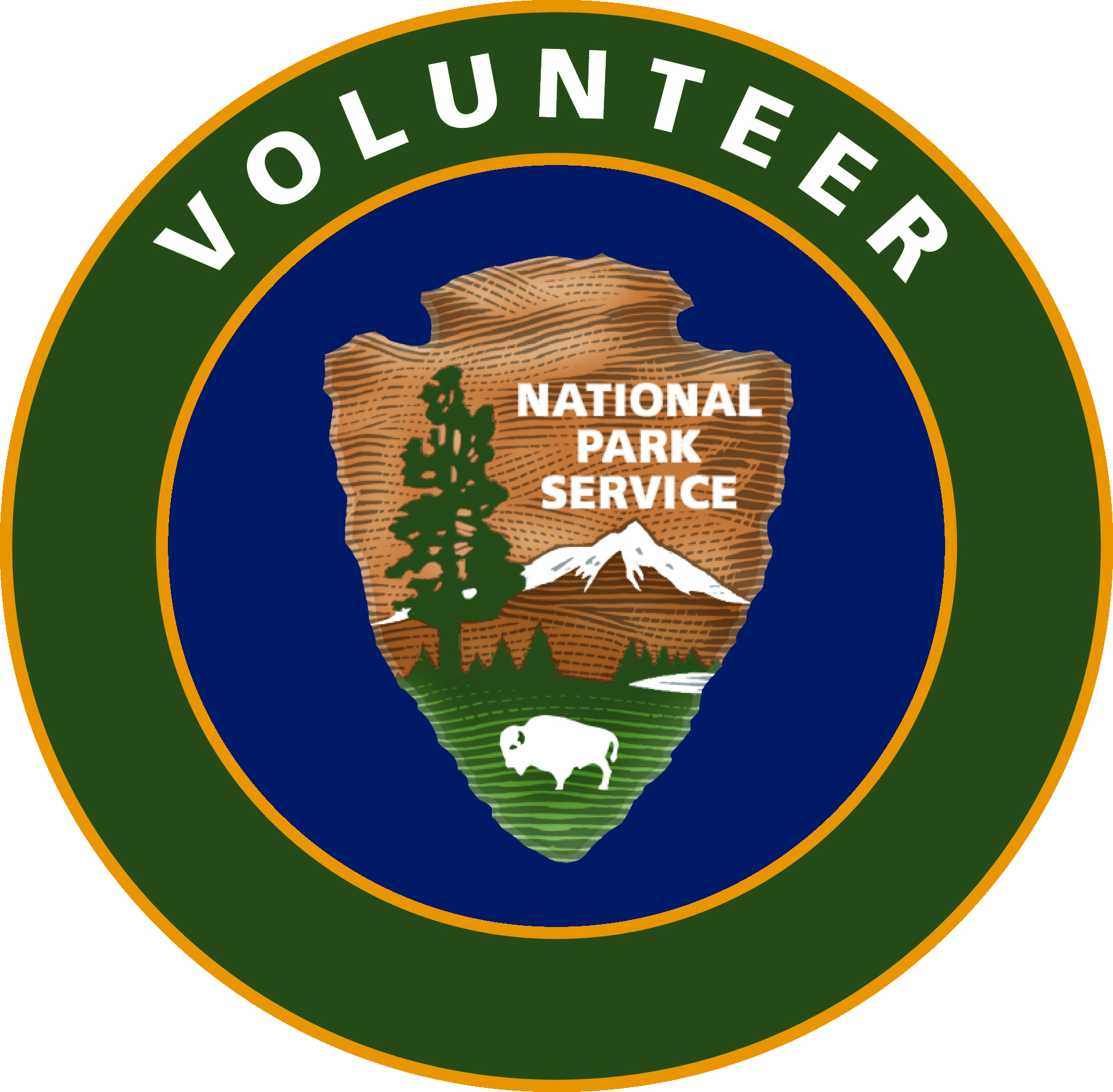
Volunteers-In-Parks Logo

Registered on October 7, 2004 (69 Federal Register 60182), the new VIP Patch was authorized for wear starting January 1, 2004, but parks had a two-year transition period.

==== Master Ranger Corps Patch, 2004–2016 ====
Registered on October 7, 2004 (Federal Register, vol. 69, no. 194, 60182), the Master Ranger Corps Patch was authorized for wear starting January 1, 2004, by any volunteer who either committed to and completed 500 hours of service and/or participated in one or more special NPS volunteer groups such as Geoscientists-In-Parks, the Natural Resources Volunteer Laureate Program, and the Volunteer Senior Ranger Corps. However, this patch is no longer authorized for wear as of March 15, 2016 (DO-7, 2016, section 10).

==== Presidential Volunteer Ranger Patch, 2005–2016 ====
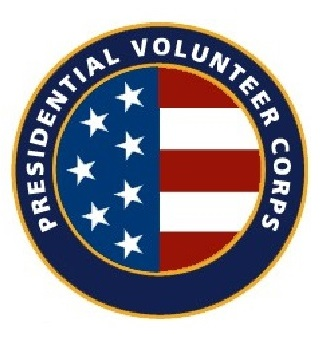
Proposed President Volunteer Corps Patch, circa 2009

The Presidential Volunteer Ranger program was established in 2005 to recognize volunteers who contributed at least 4,000 hours or more of cumulative service to the National Park Service. This program shouldn’t be confused with the President’s Volunteer Service Award which also has a Lifetime Achievement Award for individuals who complete 4,000 or more hours in their lifetime. A draft design was created circa 2009. The Presidential Volunteer Ranger program was discontinued in 2016 with the adoption of a new Director’s Order on the VIP Program (DO-7, 2016).

==== Volunteer Emeritus Patch, circa 2014 ====
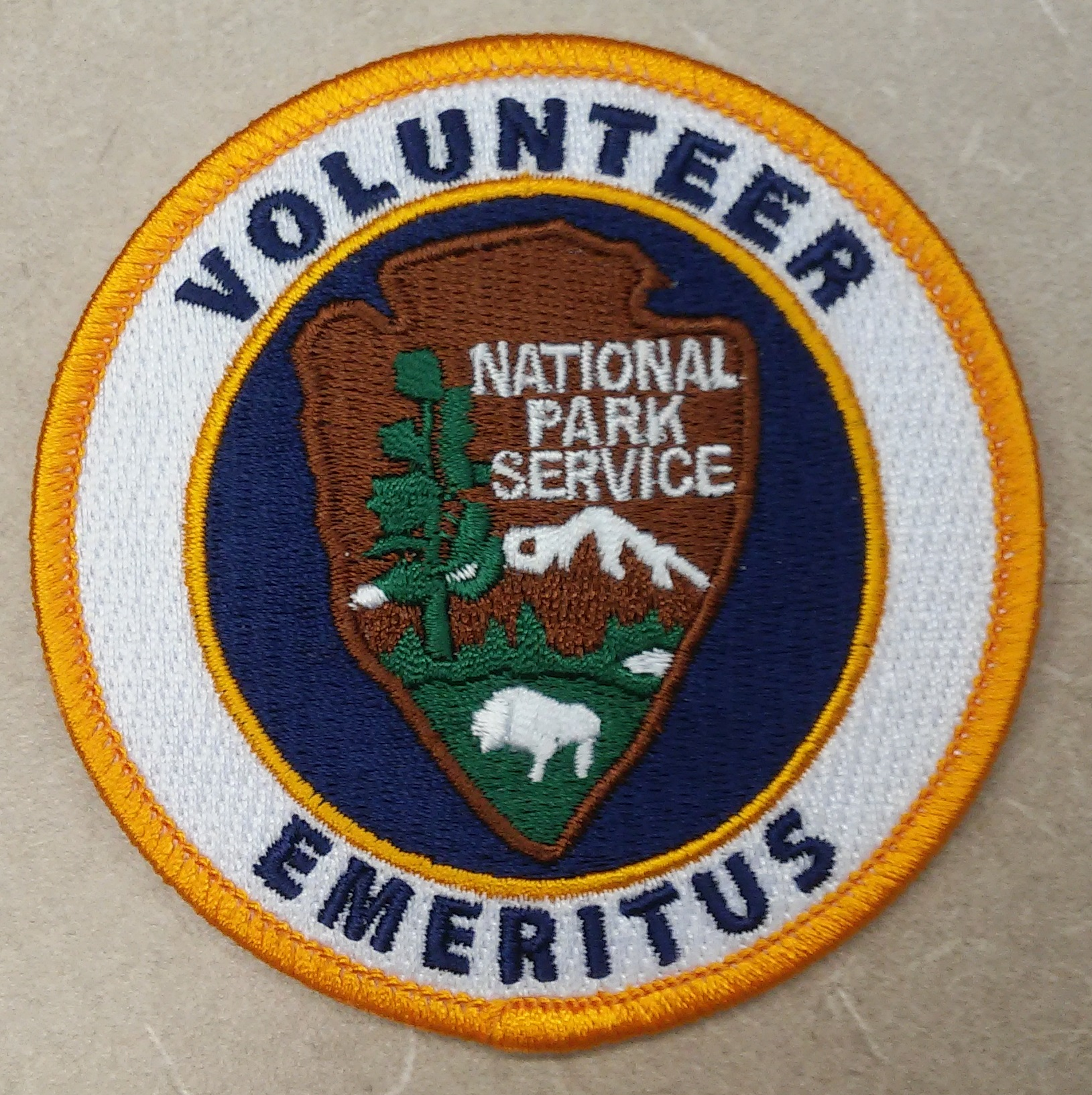
VIP Emeritus Patch, circa 2014

The idea for a Volunteer Emeritus Program was suggested in a draft Director’s Order 7 in 2014. Launched in collaboration with the Coalition of National Park Service Retirees, the Emeritus Volunteer Program seems to have been an effort to engage NPS retirees in volunteerism (http://protectnps.org/nps-emeritus-volunteer-opportunities/). Although a patch was created and available, no policies were ever issued regarding the wear of this patch.

==== Take Pride in America Tab, circa 2003–2011 ====
The Take Pride in America program was created 1985 and re-launched by the Secretary of the Interior in 2003. A Take Pride in America Tab soon appeared on VIP uniforms. Although the Take Pride in America Act is still used for certain Department of the Interior programs, it’s no longer being actively promoted.
