= Stephen Adams (businessman) =

American businessman (1937–2024)

- Born: November 7, 1937; Minneapolis, Minnesota, U.S.
- Died: March 14, 2024 (aged 86); Roxbury, Connecticut, U.S.
- Other name: Mr. S Adams
- Education: Yale University; Stanford Business School
- Occupations: Businessman, private equity investor, philanthropist
- Employer(s): Good Sam Enterprises, Adams Outdoor Advertising
- Children: 4

Stephen Adams (November 7, 1937 – March 14, 2024) was an American businessman, private equity investor, and philanthropist. His holdings have included Good Sam Enterprises, a national publisher, retail stores, and member-based direct marketing organization directed toward owners of recreational vehicles and Adams Outdoor Advertising, an operator of outdoor advertising structures in the Midwest, Southeast, and Mid-Atlantic regions of the United States. His previous holdings have included operators of television and radio stations, print publishers, cola bottlers and community banks.

== Early life ==
Adams was born at Minneapolis on November 7, 1937, and was raised in Minnesota. Adams received a bachelor's degree in 1959 from Yale University, where he was a member of Skull and Bones. He received his MBA from the Stanford Graduate School of Business in 1962. Adams is the son of long-time newspaper journalist and CBS radio and television broadcaster Cedric Adams.

== Professional career ==
As of the end of 2007, Adams served as chairman of the board of Affinity Group Inc., FreedomRoads and Affinity Bank (now known as Camping World/GoodSam, Inc.) and was also chairman and the controlling shareholder of Adams Outdoor Advertising. He has been chairman of Affinity Group Inc. since its acquisition in December 1988 and chairman of Adams Outdoor Advertising since its founding in 1983. He also served as chairman of Adams Radio Group (based in Lakeville, Minnesota) and Adams Publishing Group (based in St. Louis Park, Minnesota).

Adams began his career in banking and soft drink bottling. Since the 1970s, Adams has served as chairman of privately owned banking, bottling, publishing, outdoor advertising, television and radio companies in which he held a controlling ownership interest. Adams owned Chateau Fonplagade in Bordeaux as well as other left bank wineries, and Adamus, Michel-Schlumberger, Roblar, and Adler Fels wineries in Northern California.

In 1982, he won a protracted fight to gain control of the Bank of Montana System. In 1984, Adams failed in a bid to take control of publicly traded Union Planters. Bank of Montana System was sold to Norwest Corporation in 1993.

=== Adams Outdoor Advertising ===
Adams Outdoor Advertising
- Type: Private
- Industry: Outdoor advertising
- Predecessor: Central Outdoor Advertising
- Founded: 1983; 43 years ago
- Founder: Stephen Adams
- Headquarters: Lansing, Michigan, U.S.
- Key people: Kevin Jones (CEO); Louise Lopez (CFO); Josh Scharfberg (CRO)
- Products: Billboards
- Revenue: ▲US$ 243 billion
- Number of employees: 437
- Website: adamsoutdoor.com

Adams Outdoor Advertising was founded in 1983 with the acquisition of Central Outdoor Advertising, located in Michigan. Over the next five years, Adams pursued a rollup of billboard and other outdoor advertising assets into additional medium-sized markets, primarily through the acquisition of existing outdoor advertising businesses in selected midwest, southeast and mid-Atlantic states (examples being Central Outdoor in Michigan, Creative Displays in the Lehigh Valley, Schloss Outdoor in North Carolina, and Turner Outdoor in Atlanta, Georgia). Today the company is privately held, however in its final year of reporting public financials, 2000, the company had approximately $80 million of revenue. Since 2000, the company has increased its market position from the 6th largest outdoor advertising company in the US to the 4th largest billboard company. In January 2015, Adams Outdoor Advertising partnered with Chicago-based private equity firm GTCR, to purchase Fairway Outdoor, effectively doubling the Outdoor holdings of Adams. Fairway Outdoor was later sold to Mediaco Holding, Inc. in 2019.

On January 3, 2022, Adams Outdoor Advertising acquired the assets of Toby Outdoor Advertising in North Carolina and Virginia, effectively adding 186 faces to Adams' Winston-Salem inventory.

=== Affinity Group Inc. ===
On December 23, 1988, the direct predecessor of Affinity Group Inc. (AGI), owned by Adams, acquired a company called American Bakeries Company for about $138 million. At the time of the merger, the sole operating assets of American Bakeries Company were TL Enterprises, Inc. (Trailer Life magazine) and Camp Coast to Coast, Inc. These entities consisted of what is today the Good Sam Club, Coast to Coast, AGI's subscription-based products and services business and AGI's RV-related publications, with the exception of the Woodall's titles.

From 1990 through 1997 AGI acquired other companies. Among the purchases were Golf Card International in 1990 for about $18 million; and in May 1994, Woodall Publishing Company, L.P. and Woodall World of Travel, L.P. (collectively Woodall's) for about $11.5 million.

In 1995, AGI acquired the 13-year-old San Francisco Thrift and Loan and moved the company's headquarters to Ventura, California. In 1997, the bank was renamed Affinity Bank; in 1999, AGI transferred ownership to Affinity Bank Holdings, Inc. a separate entity controlled by Adams

In March 1997, as part of AGI's $130.0-million offering of the holding company notes due 2007, AGI acquired Camping World, Inc. and Ehlert Publishing for about $123.0 million and $22.3 million, respectively. AGI is now known as Camping World/GoodSam, and is the largest RV dealer network and camping retailer in the United States. NBC's The Profit features Camping World/GoodSam CEO Marcus Lemonis as its star. On October 7, 2016, Camping World/GoodSam sold its initial public offering as Camping World Holdings, Inc.; today, it trades on the New York Stock Exchange as CWH.

== Newspapers ==
In 2013, Stephen Adams' son, Mark Adams, formed Adams Publishing Group (APG). Stephen Adams served as Chairman of the board of Adams Publishing Group. APG is a Limited liability company that owns newspapers in over 20 states. It is currently headquartered in Greeneville, Tennessee.

== Political affiliations ==
Adams has raised funds for Republican Party candidates. He reportedly contributed over $1 million of billboard advertising (through his Adams Outdoor Advertising business) to support George W. Bush's 2000 presidential campaign.

== Philanthropy ==
The Adams Family Foundation, founded by Adams and his wife, Denise, has made grants to a variety of educational institutions including Yale University, Stanford University, Westmont College, the Lyme Academy College of Fine Arts, and The Blake School. Adams donated $100 million to the Yale School of Music in 2005, the largest single contribution in the school's history to that point. Adams made the school tuition-free, joined the board, and funded the construction of the Adams Center for Musical Arts, which was dedicated in a 2017 ceremony officiated by Yale President Peter Salovey. After being diagnosed with Parkinson's disease, Adams donated the Yale Neuroscience Center.

== Awards ==
Adams was selected to receive the Arbuckle Award from Stanford University's Graduate School of Business in 2006. In 2009, Adams received the Yale Medal, the highest award bestowed by the Yale Alumni Association.

== Personal life ==
Adams was married to his fourth wife, the former Denise Rhea. He has four sons from his first marriage to the late Virginia Susan Ridgway: Stephen Marcus, Mark Charles, Kent Ridgway, and Scott Learned Adams. Ridgway was the granddaughter of John Ridgway, co-founder of IDS (now known as Ameriprise Financial). Ameriprise Financial is a Fortune 200 company with a market capitalization of $21 billion. The Ridgway family sold their interest in IDS to American Express in 1984 for $600 million. IDS/American Express subsequently was renamed American Express Financial Advisers, and subsequently was spun off by American Express as its own publicly traded company in 2005, and renamed Ameriprise Financial. The company's flagship corporate headquarters, the IDS Centre, is the tallest building in Minneapolis, Minnesota, designed by Phillip Johnson and completed in 1974, although it no longer houses Ameriprise's corporate headquarters. Adams lived in Roxbury, Connecticut; Healdsburg, California; Big Timber, Montana; and Saint Emilion (Bordeaux), France.

He died at his home in Roxbury on March 14, 2024, at the age of 86.

== See also ==
- Camping World
