= Crumbs Bake Shop =

Former bakery chain headquartered in New York City

- Type: Public
- Traded as: Expert Market: CRMBQ
- Industry: Bakery
- Founded: 2003
- Founder: Mia & Jason Bauer
- Defunct: December 19, 2016
- Headquarters: New York, New York, U.S.
- Key people: Harley Bauer (CDO)
- Products: Cupcakes, cakes
- Revenue: $57 million (2013 revised projection)
- Website: Crumbs Bake Shop

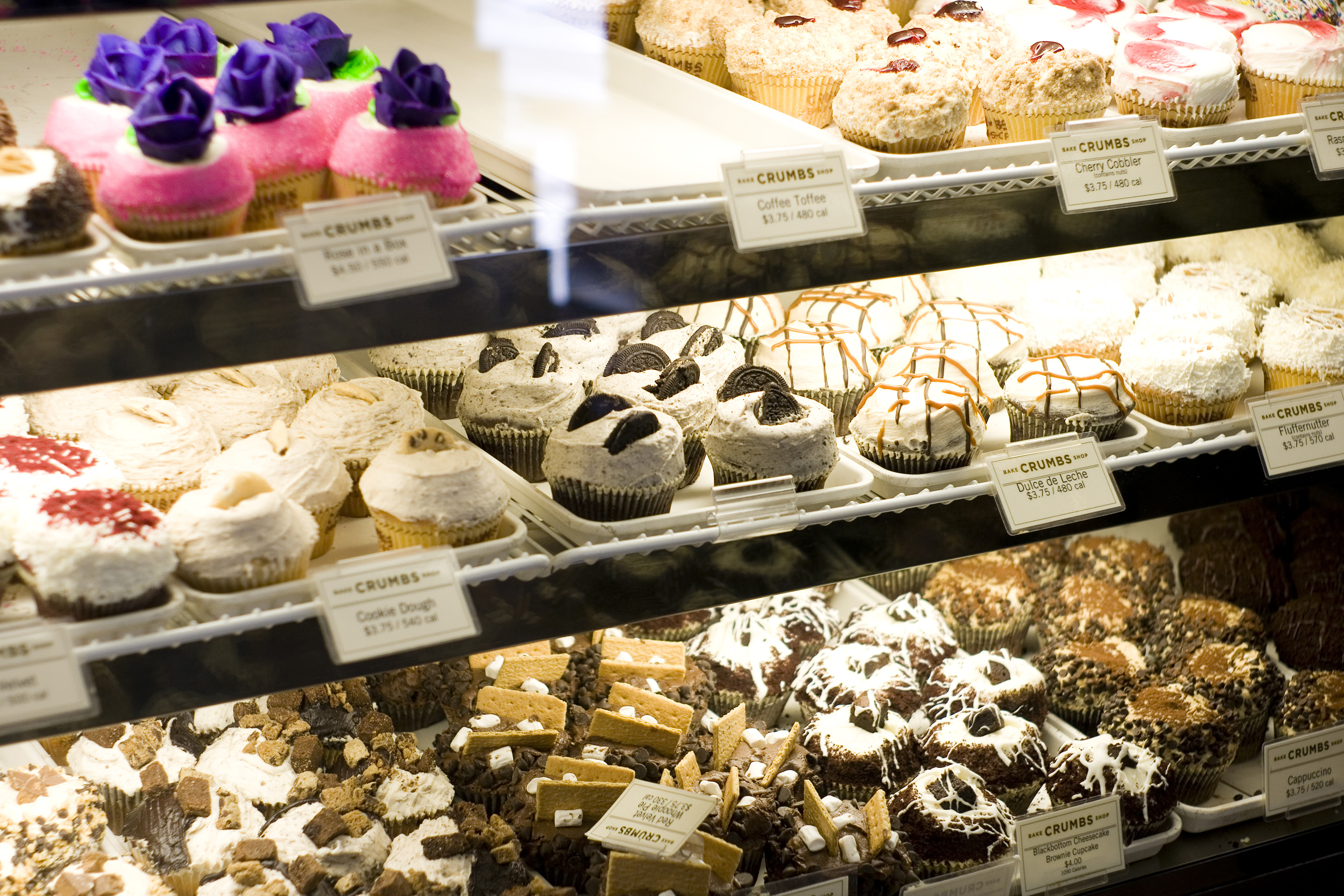
Crumbs cupcakes in a display case

Crumbs Bake Shop is an online store and a former bakery chain headquartered in New York City. Founded in 2003 as a small mom-and-pop style bakery on the Upper West Side of Manhattan by Mia & Jason Bauer, the company expanded to 79 locations in ten states (New York, Illinois, Virginia, Connecticut, New Hampshire, Massachusetts, New Jersey, Rhode Island, Maryland, and California) and Washington, D.C.

Crumbs was the largest cupcake chain in the United States. It produced more than 50 varieties of gourmet cupcakes. Crumbs reopened on October 14, 2014 at its Broadway location in New York and other locations after a three-month shutdown, and then closed all of its reopened stores permanently in December 2016. The brand is currently operating as an online store.

== Partnerships ==
On August 6, 2012, the company announced a partnership with Starbucks to serve their brand of coffees, teas, and other assorted beverages. The partnership ended in September 2013 due to a sharp decrease in sales and customer satisfaction.

On May 15, 2013, the company announced it had partnered with chef and restaurateur David Burke to begin marketing a new line of gourmet sandwiches and salads to be sold at select Crumbs locations. This partnership ended roughly a month later due to poor sales.

On September 13, 2013, the company announced the planned opening of their first ever gluten-free store in lower Manhattan. Crumbs Gluten Free featured the same cupcakes, cookies, brownies and pastries that the brand is known for in gluten-free versions.

On February 4, 2014, the company announced a partnership with Pelican Bay Ltd. to create a line of At-Home kits, including Crumbs Cupcake mixes, hot chocolate kits, cupcake-in-a-mug kits and "Colossal" cupcake kits. The line was sold at club and craft stores across the country. The company shut the doors for customers on December 19, 2016.

== Financial status ==
Crumbs Bake Shop, a publicly traded business listed on NASDAQ, reached its peak stock price in 2011. A one-time loss of US $700,000 due to Hurricane Sandy in combination with steadily declining sales due to competition from locally owned mom-and-pop cupcake shops as well as increased competition from grocery stores, caused a sharp decline in the company's prospects and stock price in 2013. Crumbs borrowed $10 million through convertible promissory notes and announced plans to close some underperforming stores in 2013.

On July 8, 2014, the company announced it was immediately closing all of the remaining locations and evaluated its options, including a possible bankruptcy filing. Crumbs, which went public three years ago at the height of the gourmet-cupcake boom, has seen its financial outlook deteriorate amid several years of losses, a dwindling cash supply, and a food craze that is petering out. The company’s stock was delisted from the NASDAQ Stock Market on July 1, a development that the company warned would trigger a default on some debt payments.

Shortly after Crumbs closed its shops, an announcement was made that a deal had been reached to transfer the rights to the chain to an investment group including Marcus Lemonis (of the CNBC reality show The Profit) and Fischer Enterprises. The group stated that their intentions were to rapidly reopen stores with more diverse offerings. As part of the agreement the existing corporation filed for bankruptcy, and court approval was needed to finalize the deal.

On August 26, 2014, Crumbs won court approval to start reopening its stores, intending to keep only about 24 stores open.

On October 14, 2014, Crumbs reopened its first shop in Manhattan.

Marcus Lemonis sold his interest in the Crumbs retail stores in September 2015, as the baked-goods venture wasn't performing to expectations.

In April 2016, the value of Crumbs stock had fallen to less than $.01 per share. In December 2016, Crumbs Bake Shop permanently closed all of its remaining stores.

In 2022, the company was sold back to the Bauer family, who reopened it as an online store and began selling their products via grocery stores and Goldbelly. It is unknown when will the stores reopen.
