= 2017 Bojangles' Southern 500 =

Auto race held at Darlington, South Carolina, United States in 2017

Race details
- Race 25 of 36 in the 2017 Monster Energy NASCAR Cup Series
- The 2017 Bojangles' Southern 500 program cover, featuring NASCAR legends Richard Petty, Dale Earnhardt, Bill Elliott, and drivers who were racing in 2017, Chase Elliott, Dale Earnhardt Jr., and Ryan Blaney.
- Date: September 3, 2017
- Location: Darlington Raceway in Darlington, South Carolina
- Course: Permanent racing facility
- Course length: 1.366 miles (2.198 km)
- Distance: 367 laps, 501.322 mi (806.666 km)
- Average speed: 132.761 miles per hour (213.658 km/h)

Pole position
Driver	Kevin Harvick	Stewart–Haas Racing
- Time: 27.669

Most laps led
Driver	Kyle Larson; Denny Hamlin	Chip Ganassi Racing; Joe Gibbs Racing
- Laps: 124

Winner
No. 11	Denny Hamlin	Joe Gibbs Racing

Television in the United States
- Network: NBCSN
- Announcers: Rick Allen, Jeff Burton and Steve Letarte; Ken Squier, Ned Jarrett, and Dale Jarrett

Radio in the United States
- Radio: MRN
- Booth announcers: Joe Moore, Jeff Striegle and Rusty Wallace
- Turn announcers: Dave Moody (1 & 2) and Mike Bagley (3 & 4)

The 2017 Bojangles' Southern 500, the 68th running of the event, was a Monster Energy NASCAR Cup Series race held on September 3, 2017 at Darlington Raceway in Darlington, South Carolina. Contested over 367 laps on the 1.366-mile (2.198 km) egg-shaped oval, it was the 25th race of the 2017 Monster Energy NASCAR Cup Series season.

== Entry list ==
No.	Driver	Team	Manufacturer	throwback
1	Jamie McMurray	Chip Ganassi Racing	Chevrolet	McDonald's David Pearson's 1980 CRC Chemicals Rebel 500 winning car
2	Brad Keselowski	Team Penske	Ford	Miller Genuine Draft Rusty Wallace's 1991–1995 car
3	Austin Dillon	Richard Childress Racing	Chevrolet	American Ethanol Dale Earnhardt's 1987 Southern 500 winning car
4	Kevin Harvick	Stewart–Haas Racing	Ford	1980s Busch Beer design, based on the “Head for the Mountains” commercials
5	Kasey Kahne	Hendrick Motorsports	Chevrolet	Great Clips Geoff Bodine's 1985 car
6	Trevor Bayne	Roush Fenway Racing	Ford	AdvoCare Mark Martin's Winston Cup Series car in 1988 and 1989
10	Danica Patrick	Stewart–Haas Racing	Ford	Ford Credit Dale Jarrett's 1999 championship-winning car
11	Denny Hamlin	Joe Gibbs Racing	Toyota	Sport Clips Ray Hendrick-inspired car
13	Ty Dillon (R)	Germain Racing	Chevrolet	GEICO Smokey Yunick's car that was driven by Johnny Rutherford in 1963
14	Clint Bowyer	Stewart–Haas Racing	Ford	Mark Martin's Busch Series car between 1988 and 1991
15	Reed Sorenson	Premium Motorsports	Toyota	Brett Bodine's 1989 car
17	Ricky Stenhouse Jr.	Roush Fenway Racing	Ford	Fifth Third Bank Darrell Waltrip's 1997 car
18	Kyle Busch	Joe Gibbs Racing	Toyota	
19	Daniel Suárez (R)	Joe Gibbs Racing	Toyota	
20	Matt Kenseth	Joe Gibbs Racing	Toyota	Retro-inspired Circle K car
21	Ryan Blaney	Wood Brothers Racing	Ford	Ford Motorcraft Kyle Petty's 1987 Coca-Cola 600 winning car
22	Joey Logano	Team Penske	Ford	Shell/Pennzoil - Jimmy Vasser's 2002 IndyCar scheme
23	Corey LaJoie (R)	BK Racing	Toyota	Dr. Pepper Davey Allison's 1984 car
24	Chase Elliott	Hendrick Motorsports	Chevrolet	NAPA Auto Parts Father Bill Elliott's 1976 Rockingham car, when Elliott made his first Winston Cup Series start
27	Paul Menard	Richard Childress Racing	Chevrolet	Retro-inspired Dutch Boy Paint car
31	Ryan Newman	Richard Childress Racing	Chevrolet	Dale Earnhardt's 1987 Southern 500 winning car
32	Matt DiBenedetto	Go Fas Racing	Ford	Bobby Allison's 1988 Daytona 500 winning car
33	Jeffrey Earnhardt	Circle Sport – The Motorsports Group	Chevrolet	Dale Earnhardt's 1989 Busch Series car
34	Landon Cassill	Front Row Motorsports	Ford	Inspired by the first Love's Travel Stop opened in 1981
37	Chris Buescher	JTG Daugherty Racing	Chevrolet	Patty Moise's 1988 Busch Series car
38	David Ragan	Front Row Motorsports	Ford	Camping World/Good Sam Club 1960s Good Sam Club design
41	Kurt Busch	Stewart–Haas Racing	Ford	
42	Kyle Larson	Chip Ganassi Racing	Chevrolet	Credit One Bank Kyle Petty's 1995 car
43	Aric Almirola	Richard Petty Motorsports	Ford	STP Richard Petty's 1984 car when he won his record-setting 200th race
47	A. J. Allmendinger	JTG Daugherty Racing	Chevrolet	Terry Labonte's 1986 car
48	Jimmie Johnson	Hendrick Motorsports	Chevrolet	Lowe's based on the delivery trucks from 1986
51	Cody Ware	Rick Ware Racing	Chevrolet	Kyle Petty's 1991–1994 and Days of Thunder protagonist Cole Trickle's Mello Yello/Pray for Texas paint schemes
55	Derrike Cope	Premium Motorsports	Toyota	Mane 'n Tail Shampoo and Conditioner based on Cope's 1994 car
66	Carl Long (i)	MBM Motorsports	Chevrolet	
72	Cole Whitt	TriStar Motorsports	Chevrolet	Grandfather Jim Whitt's 1972–73 car, known as the “Lime Green Machine”, when he won the Cajon Speedway Track Championship
77	Erik Jones (R)	Furniture Row Racing	Toyota	5-Hour Energy Special paint scheme that pays tribute to the Cup Rookie of the Year award winners from 1984 to 1989
78	Martin Truex Jr.	Furniture Row Racing	Toyota	Bass Pro Shops 40th Anniversary
83	Gray Gaulding (R)	BK Racing	Toyota	
88	Dale Earnhardt Jr.	Hendrick Motorsports	Chevrolet	Nationwide Insurance Based on Dale Jr's 1998–1999 Busch Series car
95	Michael McDowell	Leavine Family Racing	Chevrolet	Alan Kulwicki's 1986 car from his rookie season
Official entry list

== Practice ==
=== First practice ===
Kyle Larson was the fastest in the first practice session with a time of 28.415 seconds and a speed of 173.064 mph (278.520 km/h).

Pos	No.	Driver	Team	Manufacturer	Time	Speed
1	42	Kyle Larson	Chip Ganassi Racing	Chevrolet	28.415	173.064
2	11	Denny Hamlin	Joe Gibbs Racing	Toyota	28.484	172.644
3	2	Brad Keselowski	Team Penske	Ford	28.494	172.584
Official first practice results

=== Final practice ===
Kyle Busch was the fastest in the final practice session with a time of 28.373 seconds and a speed of 173.320 mph (278.932 km/h).

Pos	No.	Driver	Team	Manufacturer	Time	Speed
1	18	Kyle Busch	Joe Gibbs Racing	Toyota	28.373	173.320
2	4	Kevin Harvick	Stewart–Haas Racing	Ford	28.414	173.070
3	1	Jamie McMurray	Chip Ganassi Racing	Chevrolet	28.427	172.990
Official final practice results

== Qualifying ==
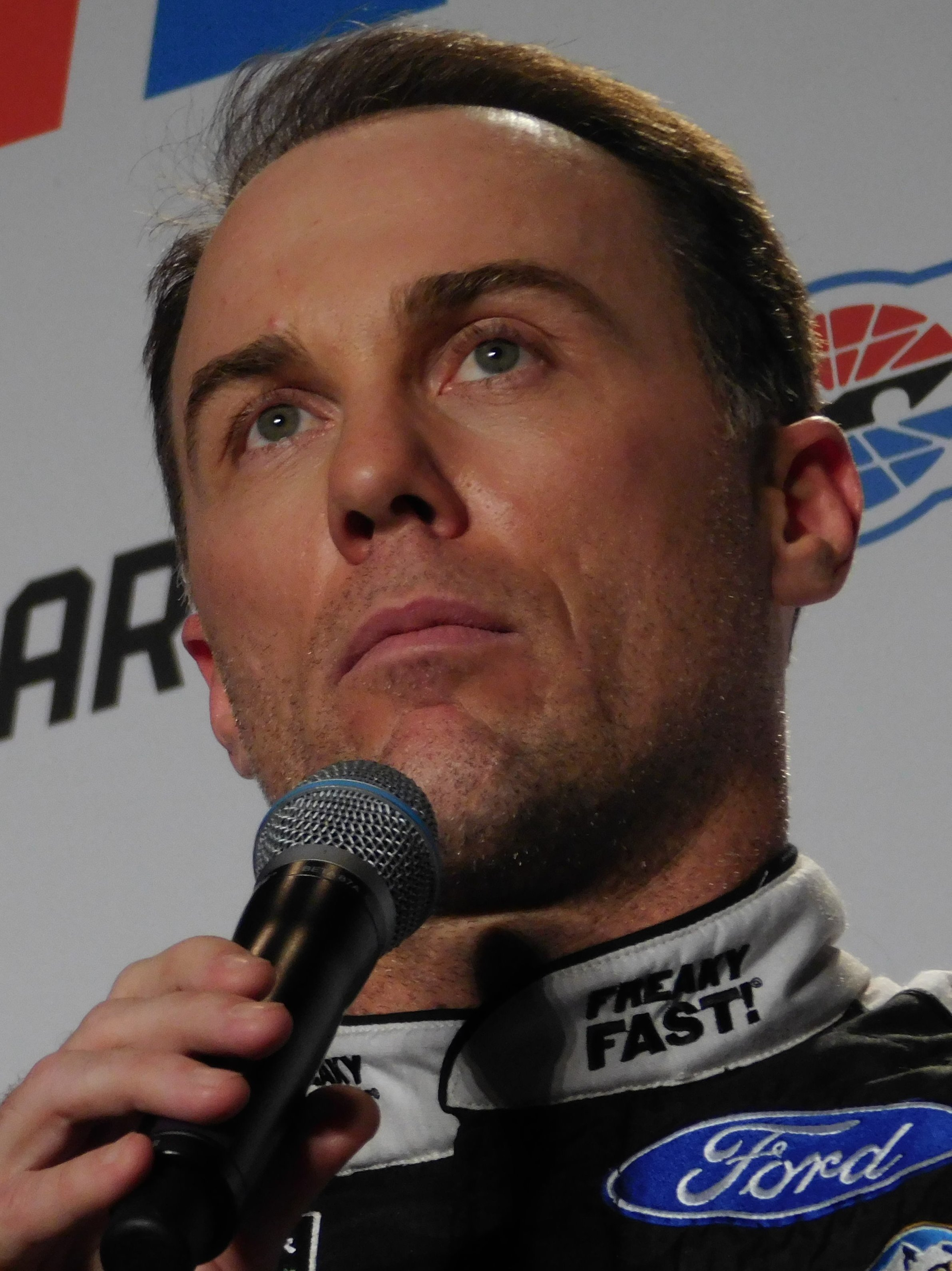
Kevin Harvick scored the pole position.

Kevin Harvick scored the pole for the race with a time of 27.669 and a speed of 177.730 mph (286.029 km/h).

=== Qualifying results ===
Pos	No.	Driver	Team	Manufacturer	R1	R2	R3
1	4	Kevin Harvick	Stewart–Haas Racing	Ford	27.598	27.703	27.669
2	78	Martin Truex Jr.	Furniture Row Racing	Toyota	27.806	27.875	27.771
3	18	Kyle Busch	Joe Gibbs Racing	Toyota	27.884	27.796	27.833
4	42	Kyle Larson	Chip Ganassi Racing	Chevrolet	27.920	27.780	27.851
5	1	Jamie McMurray	Chip Ganassi Racing	Chevrolet	27.794	27.769	27.874
6	2	Brad Keselowski	Team Penske	Ford	27.932	27.811	27.924
7	41	Kurt Busch	Stewart–Haas Racing	Ford	27.767	27.856	27.935
8	22	Joey Logano	Team Penske	Ford	27.874	27.892	27.940
9	11	Denny Hamlin	Joe Gibbs Racing	Toyota	27.985	27.824	27.954
10	77	Erik Jones (R)	Furniture Row Racing	Toyota	27.868	27.758	28.036
11	20	Matt Kenseth	Joe Gibbs Racing	Toyota	27.753	27.952	28.041
12	21	Ryan Blaney	Wood Brothers Racing	Ford	27.972	27.918	28.097
13	3	Austin Dillon	Richard Childress Racing	Chevrolet	27.816	27.968	—
14	17	Ricky Stenhouse Jr.	Roush Fenway Racing	Ford	27.852	28.038	—
15	43	Aric Almirola	Richard Petty Motorsports	Ford	27.989	28.048	—
16	14	Clint Bowyer	Stewart–Haas Racing	Ford	28.032	28.054	—
17	31	Ryan Newman	Richard Childress Racing	Chevrolet	27.958	28.091	—
18	48	Jimmie Johnson	Hendrick Motorsports	Chevrolet	27.996	28.097	—
19	19	Daniel Suárez (R)	Joe Gibbs Racing	Toyota	28.041	28.109	—
20	24	Chase Elliott	Hendrick Motorsports	Chevrolet	27.911	28.115	—
21	27	Paul Menard	Richard Childress Racing	Chevrolet	28.017	28.155	—
22	88	Dale Earnhardt Jr.	Hendrick Motorsports	Chevrolet	28.054	28.162	—
23	5	Kasey Kahne	Hendrick Motorsports	Chevrolet	28.000	28.261	—
24	6	Trevor Bayne	Roush Fenway Racing	Ford	28.112	28.309	—
25	13	Ty Dillon (R)	Germain Racing	Chevrolet	28.132	—	—
26	38	David Ragan	Front Row Motorsports	Ford	28.146	—	—
27	37	Chris Buescher	JTG Daugherty Racing	Chevrolet	28.172	—	—
28	32	Matt DiBenedetto	Go Fas Racing	Ford	28.184	—	—
29	47	A. J. Allmendinger	JTG Daugherty Racing	Chevrolet	28.301	—	—
30	95	Michael McDowell	Leavine Family Racing	Chevrolet	28.310	—	—
31	34	Landon Cassill	Front Row Motorsports	Ford	28.429	—	—
32	15	Reed Sorenson	Premium Motorsports	Toyota	28.620	—	—
33	10	Danica Patrick	Stewart–Haas Racing	Ford	28.631	—	—
34	72	Cole Whitt	TriStar Motorsports	Chevrolet	28.681	—	—
35	23	Corey LaJoie (R)	BK Racing	Toyota	28.684	—	—
36	83	Gray Gaulding (R)	BK Racing	Toyota	28.765	—	—
37	33	Jeffrey Earnhardt	Circle Sport – The Motorsports Group	Chevrolet	28.876	—	—
38	55	Derrike Cope	Premium Motorsports	Toyota	29.372	—	—
39	51	Cody Ware	Rick Ware Racing	Chevrolet	29.566	—	—
40	66	Carl Long (i)	MBM Motorsports	Chevrolet	29.697	—	—
Official qualifying results

== Race ==
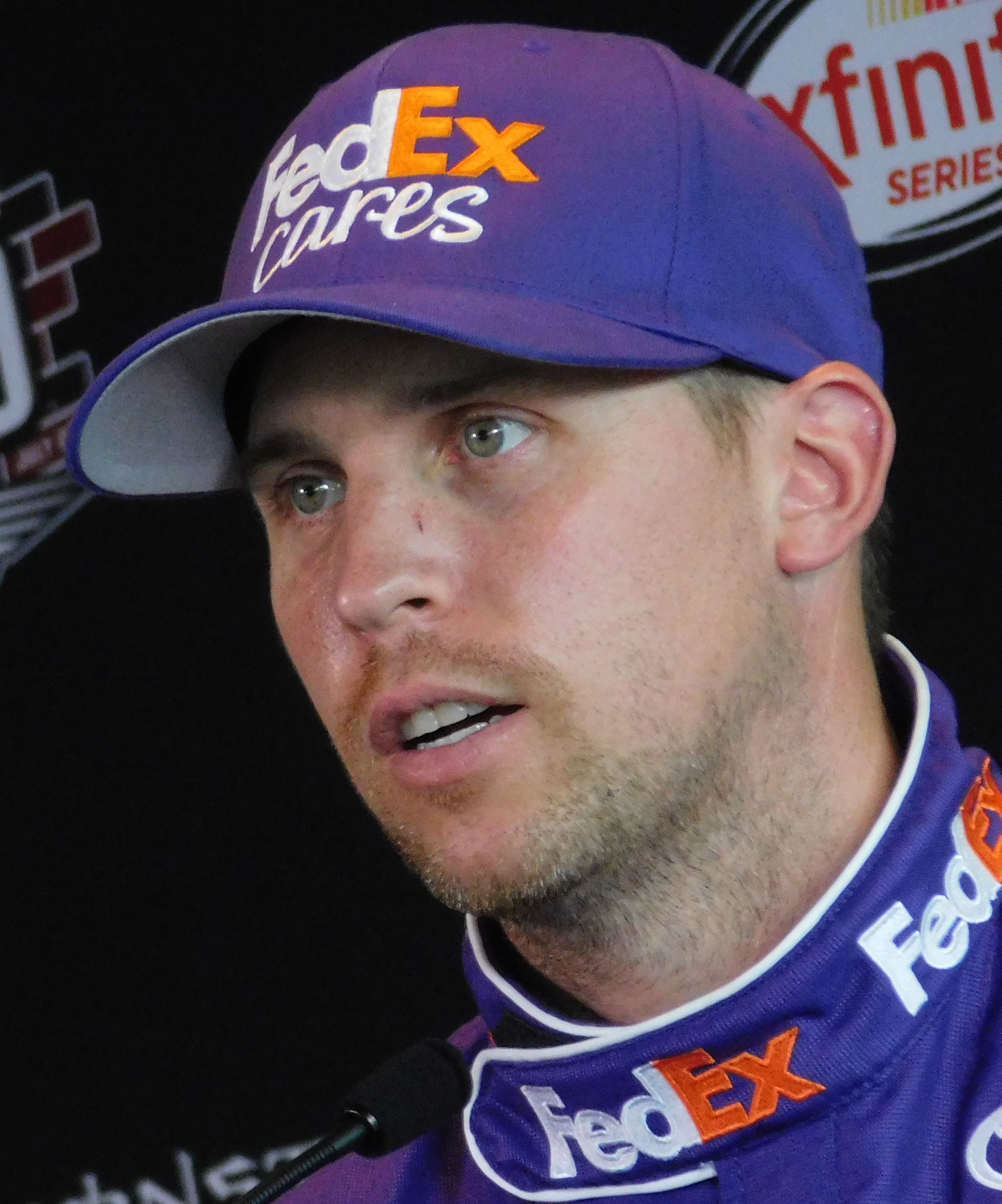
Denny Hamlin won the race.

=== Race results ===
==== Stage results ====
Stage 1 Laps: 100

Pos	No	Driver	Team	Manufacturer	Points
1	78	Martin Truex Jr.	Furniture Row Racing	Toyota	10
2	42	Kyle Larson	Chip Ganassi Racing	Chevrolet	9
3	11	Denny Hamlin	Joe Gibbs Racing	Toyota	8
4	4	Kevin Harvick	Stewart–Haas Racing	Ford	7
5	2	Brad Keselowski	Team Penske	Ford	6
6	77	Erik Jones (R)	Furniture Row Racing	Toyota	5
7	1	Jamie McMurray	Chip Ganassi Racing	Chevrolet	4
8	22	Joey Logano	Team Penske	Ford	3
9	18	Kyle Busch	Joe Gibbs Racing	Toyota	2
10	3	Austin Dillon	Richard Childress Racing	Chevrolet	1
Official stage one results

Stage 2 Laps: 100

Pos	No	Driver	Team	Manufacturer	Points
1	78	Martin Truex Jr.	Furniture Row Racing	Toyota	10
2	11	Denny Hamlin	Joe Gibbs Racing	Toyota	9
3	4	Kevin Harvick	Stewart–Haas Racing	Ford	8
4	42	Kyle Larson	Chip Ganassi Racing	Chevrolet	7
5	18	Kyle Busch	Joe Gibbs Racing	Toyota	6
6	2	Brad Keselowski	Team Penske	Ford	5
7	41	Kurt Busch	Stewart–Haas Racing	Ford	4
8	1	Jamie McMurray	Chip Ganassi Racing	Chevrolet	3
9	3	Austin Dillon	Richard Childress Racing	Chevrolet	2
10	20	Matt Kenseth	Joe Gibbs Racing	Toyota	1
Official stage two results

=== Final stage results ===
Stage 3 Laps: 167

Pos	Grid	No	Driver	Team	Manufacturer	Laps	Points
1	9	11	Denny Hamlin†	Joe Gibbs Racing	Toyota	367	32
2	3	18	Kyle Busch	Joe Gibbs Racing	Toyota	367	43
3	7	41	Kurt Busch	Stewart–Haas Racing	Ford	367	38
4	13	3	Austin Dillon	Richard Childress Racing	Chevrolet	367	36
5	10	77	Erik Jones (R)	Furniture Row Racing	Toyota	367	37
6	11	20	Matt Kenseth	Joe Gibbs Racing	Toyota	367	32
7	17	31	Ryan Newman	Richard Childress Racing	Chevrolet	367	30
8	2	78	Martin Truex Jr.	Furniture Row Racing	Toyota	367	49
9	1	4	Kevin Harvick	Stewart–Haas Racing	Ford	366	43
10	5	1	Jamie McMurray	Chip Ganassi Racing	Chevrolet	366	34
11	20	24	Chase Elliott	Hendrick Motorsports	Chevrolet	366	26
12	18	48	Jimmie Johnson	Hendrick Motorsports	Chevrolet	366	25
13	25	13	Ty Dillon (R)	Germain Racing	Chevrolet	366	24
14	4	42	Kyle Larson	Chip Ganassi Racing	Chevrolet	366	39
15	6	2	Brad Keselowski	Team Penske	Ford	366	33
16	21	27	Paul Menard	Richard Childress Racing	Chevrolet	366	21
17	27	37	Chris Buescher	JTG Daugherty Racing	Chevrolet	366	20
18	8	22	Joey Logano	Team Penske	Ford	366	22
19	30	95	Michael McDowell	Leavine Family Racing	Chevrolet	365	18
20	15	43	Aric Almirola	Richard Petty Motorsports	Ford	365	17
21	31	34	Landon Cassill	Front Row Motorsports	Ford	365	16
22	22	88	Dale Earnhardt Jr.	Hendrick Motorsports	Chevrolet	365	15
23	34	72	Cole Whitt	TriStar Motorsports	Chevrolet	364	14
24	23	5	Kasey Kahne	Hendrick Motorsports	Chevrolet	364	13
25	26	38	David Ragan	Front Row Motorsports	Ford	363	12
26	33	10	Danica Patrick	Stewart–Haas Racing	Ford	363	11
27	28	32	Matt DiBenedetto	Go Fas Racing	Ford	362	10
28	35	23	Corey LaJoie (R)	BK Racing	Toyota	360	9
29	14	17	Ricky Stenhouse Jr.	Roush Fenway Racing	Ford	358	8
30	37	33	Jeffrey Earnhardt	Circle Sport – The Motorsports Group	Chevrolet	356	7
31	12	21	Ryan Blaney	Wood Brothers Racing	Ford	356	6
32	38	55	Derrike Cope	Premium Motorsports	Toyota	351	5
33	40	66	Carl Long (i)	MBM Motorsports	Chevrolet	350	0
34	29	47	A. J. Allmendinger	JTG Daugherty Racing	Chevrolet	340	3
35	24	6	Trevor Bayne	Roush Fenway Racing	Ford	336	2
36	36	83	Gray Gaulding (R)	BK Racing	Toyota	202	1
37	39	51	Cody Ware	Rick Ware Racing	Chevrolet	144	1
38	19	19	Daniel Suárez (R)	Joe Gibbs Racing	Toyota	125	1
39	32	15	Reed Sorenson	Premium Motorsports	Toyota	104	1
40	16	14	Clint Bowyer	Stewart–Haas Racing	Ford	18	1
Official race results

† Denny Hamlin was penalized 25 points and the win is encumbered due to a rear suspension infraction post-race.

=== Race statistics ===
- Lead changes: 8 among different drivers
- Cautions/Laps: 8 for 38
- Red flags: 0
- Time of race: 3 hours, 46 minutes and 34 seconds
- Average speed: 132.761 miles per hour (213.658 km/h)

== Media ==
=== Television ===
NBC Sports covered the race on the television side. Rick Allen, two–time Darlington winner Jeff Burton and Steve Letarte had the call in the booth for the race. As part of the throwback weekend, Ken Squier, Ned Jarrett and Dale Jarrett also called a portion of the race. Dave Burns, Marty Snider and Kelli Stavast reported from pit lane during the race.

NBCSN
Booth announcers	Pit reporters
Lap-by-lap: Rick Allen and Ken Squier; Color-commentator: Jeff Burton and Ned Jarrett; Color-commentator: Steve Letarte and Dale Jarrett	Dave Burns; Marty Snider; Kelli Stavast

=== Radio ===
The Motor Racing Network had the radio call for the race, which was simulcast on Sirius XM NASCAR Radio. Dave Moody called the race from a billboard outside of turn when the field raced through turns 1 and 2, and Mike Bagley had the call of the race atop of the Darlington Raceway Club outside of turn 3 when the field raced through turns 3 and 4.

MRN
Booth announcers	Turn announcers	Pit reporters
Lead announcer: Joe Moore; Announcer: Jeff Striegle; Announcer: Rusty Wallace	Turns 1 & 2: Dave Moody; Turns 3 & 4: Mike Bagley	Alex Hayden; Winston Kelley; Steve Post

== Standings after the race ==
Drivers' Championship standings

	Pos	Driver	Points
	1	Martin Truex Jr.	1,000
	2	Kyle Busch	893 (–107)
	3	Kyle Larson	884 (–116)
	4	Kevin Harvick	867 (–133)
	5	Denny Hamlin	810 (–190)
	6	Brad Keselowski	761 (–239)
	7	Chase Elliott	737 (–263)
	8	Matt Kenseth	735 (–265)
	9	Jamie McMurray	734 (–266)
1	10	Jimmie Johnson	653 (–347)
1	11	Clint Bowyer	643 (–357)
	12	Ryan Blaney	629 (–371)
	13	Kurt Busch	624 (–376)
2	14	Erik Jones	611 (–389)
1	15	Joey Logano	605 (–395)
1	16	Ryan Newman	604 (–396)
Official driver's standings

Manufacturers' Championship standings

	Pos	Manufacturer	Points
2	1	Toyota	879
1	2	Chevrolet	878 (–1)
1	3	Ford	874 (–5)
Official manufacturers' standings

- Note: Only the first 16 positions are included for the driver standings.
- . – Driver has clinched a position in the Monster Energy NASCAR Cup Series playoffs.

Previous race: 2017 Bass Pro Shops NRA Night Race	Monster Energy NASCAR Cup Series; 2017 season	Next race: 2017 Federated Auto Parts 400
