= Good Sam =

Good Sam may refer to:

- Good Sam (1948 film), an American romantic comedy starring Gary Cooper and Ann Sheridan
- Good Sam (2019 film), an American drama starring Tiya Sircar
- Good Sam (TV series), an American medical drama starring Sophia Bush and Jason Isaacs
- Good Sam Club, an organization for recreational vehicle (RV) owners
- Good Sam Enterprises, a membership organization for RV owners and camping enthusiasts

== See also ==
- The Good Samaritan (disambiguation), a bible character and name of many organizations and related stories
- Sam Goode, a fictional character in Lorien Legacies young adult science fiction books
- Sam Goody, a music and entertainment retailer in the United States and United Kingdom
