= Farrell's Ice Cream Parlour =

American restaurant chain (1963–2019)

Farrell's Ice Cream Parlour and Restaurant
- Type: Private by Parlour Enterprises in the U.S.
- Industry: Restaurants
- Founded: 1963; 63 years ago in Portland, Oregon, U.S.
- Founder: Bob Farrell and Ken McCarthy
- Defunct: 2019; 7 years ago
- Fate: Closure of last location
- Headquarters: United States
- Number of locations: 120 (1975)
- Owner: Marcus Lemonis

Farrell's Ice Cream Parlour was an American ice cream parlor and sandwich chain that was founded in Portland, Oregon, in 1963. The chain became defunct following the closure of its last location in Brea, California, in 2019.

== History ==
=== 1963-1990: Original franchise ===
Farrell's Ice Cream Parlour was started at NW 21st Avenue in Portland, Oregon, by Bob Farrell and Ken McCarthy in 1963. Farrell's became known for their offer of a free ice cream sundae to children on their birthday. The parlors had an 1890s theme, with employees wearing period dress and straw boater hats, and each location featured a player piano.

The Farrell's chain was purchased in 1972 by the Marriott Corporation, and by 1975, there were 120 Farrell's nationwide. It peaked at 130 locations.

Thereafter, sales dropped and most of the parlors were sold off in the 1980s. Marriott sold the chain to a group of private investors in 1982, and by 1990, almost all Farrell's locations had closed.

=== 1990-2007: Independent operations ===
The remaining Farrell's locations continued to operate independently after the original chain had closed. As of 2000, there were only two locations in southern California operating under the Farrell's name. One in Mira Mesa operated by the Ortmann family who had owned and operated all the San Diego locations. A new Farrell's was opened in 1999 in Temecula, California by a former Farrell's employee, Herman Chan. One of the last original Farrell's locations in Portland, located near the Lloyd Center mall, closed in 2001. At the time of its closing, it was privately owned and known as The Original Portland Ice Cream Parlor. The final original location closed in 2007 in Eugene, Oregon. At the time, it was operating under the name of Pearl Street Ice Cream Parlour.

=== 2008-2019: Revival of franchise ===
In 2008, after a years-long legal battle over rights to the brand, Parlour Enterprises of Lake Forest, California, was confirmed as the owner and operator of Farrell's properties on the U.S. mainland. The company established a franchise model with original founder Bob Farrell as an advisor. They promptly opened seven Farrell's locations in California, including the Mountasia Family Fun Center in Santa Clarita; Rancho Cucamonga; downtown Brea; Riverside; Sacramento; and Buena Park. In 2009, there was a discussion of an eventual return to Portland, but nothing came of it. By 2014, there was a total of 8 restaurants with one each in Hawaii and Sacramento and the remainder in Southern California.

There were eight Farrell's locations in Hawaii. The last Farrell's in the state was operated by E Noa Corporation at Pearlridge shopping center in Aiea, Hawaii. After 10 years in service, it closed at the end of their lease in October 2016.

By 2016, Farrell's had accumulated $2 million in debt and was forced to start closing under-performing locations. The Mission Viejo location closed in January 2016.

In April 2016, the Farrell's inside Mountasia Family Fun Center was re-branded and named Lickity Split by Farrell's, featuring over-the-counter dining and a streamlined menu.

In August 2016, Farrell's was featured on CNBC's series The Profit, where Marcus Lemonis made a deal with the current owners and stakeholders of the Farrell's brand; three locations stayed open with a last push to bring back the iconic restaurant and ice cream parlour. Also in August 2016, the Sacramento and Rancho Cucamonga locations closed. The Santa Clarita location quietly closed sometime after the closure of the Rancho Cucamonga but before the closure of the Riverside location in late July 2017.

After purchasing the company, Lemonis immediately closed the Buena Park location for renovations and reopened the restaurant in August 2017. Besides the Buena Park location, only the Brea location remained open.

The Buena Park location closed on December 30, 2018, leaving Brea as the last remaining location. The Brea location closed on June 8, 2019, leaving no remaining locations. While Lemonis owns 51% of the brand, he had no ownership in the Brea location.

== Menu ==
The menu was printed as a tabloid-style newspaper. It featured appetizers, sandwiches, burgers, and dozens of different sundaes, as well as malts, shakes, sodas, and floats. Unusual offerings included a glass of soda water for 2 cents, and the traditional free sundae for customers celebrating a birthday. Some of the sundaes were huge and intended for a group to share. The largest, the "Zoo" sundae, was delivered with great fanfare by a number of employees carrying it wildly around the restaurant on a stretcher, accompanied by the sound of ambulance sirens. The "Zoo", weighing 6 pounds, was made with five different flavors of ice cream, three sherberts, five toppings, bananas, whipped cream, nuts, and cherries. Another sundae was the hot fudge volcano, consisting of 30 scoops of vanilla ice cream, whipped cream, nuts, and cherries, with a large side of hot fudge, and served with flaming sugar cubes doused in lemon extract. The "Pig Trough" or "Trough", a sundae served in a mini pig trough, included ice cream, bananas, whipped cream, cherries, and nuts. It was meant for two, but if one person could eat the entire sundae, employees would come out banging on a drum, announce the accomplishment to the entire restaurant, and present the customer with either a ribbon or a pinback button that said, "I made a pig of myself at Farrell's!"

One of the highlights of their original menu was a "Low-Calorie Diet" menu sheet for those who "ate too much ice cream." A bowl of "Bees Knees and Mosquito Knuckles" were among the fantasy foods that featured in the joke menu. Underneath the menu it was stated that "Anything Worth Eating Has Calories."

== Sacramento location tragedy ==
On September 24, 1972, a privately owned Canadair Sabre jet (a variant of the F-86 Sabre) piloted by Richard Bingham failed to take off while leaving the Golden West Sport Aviation Air Show at Sacramento, California's Executive Airport. It went off the end of the runway and crashed into the ice cream parlour; 22 people died and 28 were injured.

== In the news ==
In 1983, the Selective Service purchased Farrell's "Birthday Club" data and mailed warnings to young men telling them to register for the draft before their 18th birthday. Use of this data was discovered when a draft letter was mailed to the address of a nonexistent child who had been created by two siblings to obtain an extra Birthday Club membership. Farrell's blamed the situation on an unauthorized sale by a list broker, and the government announced they would stop using the list.

On August 23, 2016, the television show The Profit featured Farrell's Ice Cream Parlours, and frankly discussed the financial health of the company and their locations, as part of a reality television show. An investment was proposed as part of a turn-around for the company and as a result, Marcus Lemonis became the majority shareholder of the Farrell's franchise. He later took over ownership of the Buena Park location, but the restaurant closed in late 2018.

In 2024, a former employee and Farrell's owner published a book about the origin of Farrell's Ice Cream Parlours in Oregon. Using 195 black and white photos from the original locations, the book shared the story of how co-founders Bob Farrell and Ken McCarthy created Farrell's and grew it into a national chain before selling it to Marriott Corporation.
