= Affinity Group =

Affinity Group may refer to:

- Affinity group, a small group of political activists
- Affinity Group Inc., a provider of products and services to the recreational vehicle (RV) market
