= NASCAR Gander Outdoors Truck Series at Chicagoland Speedway =

NASCAR Truck Series race at Chicagoland Speedway

Camping World 225

NASCAR Gander Outdoors Truck Series
- Venue: Chicagoland Speedway
- Location: Joliet, Illinois, United States
- Corporate sponsor: Camping World
- First race: 2009
- Last race: 2019
- Distance: 225 miles (362.102 km)
- Laps: 150; Stages 1/2: 35 each Final stage: 80
- Previous names: Enjoyillinois.com 225 (2009–2010, 2013); Fast Five 225 (2011); American Ethanol 225 (2012); Lucas Oil 225 (2014); American Ethanol E15 225 (2015–2016); TheHouse.com 225 (2017); Overton's 225 (2018); Camping World 225 (2019)
- Most wins (driver): Kyle Busch (5)
- Most wins (team): Kyle Busch Motorsports (4)
- Most wins (manufacturer): Toyota (6)

Circuit information
- Surface: Asphalt
- Length: 1.5 mi (2.4 km)
- Turns: 4

Pickup truck racing events in the then-NASCAR Gander Outdoors Truck Series have been held annually at Chicagoland Speedway in Joliet, Illinois.

== History ==
The race debuted in 2009 and marked the first time that the Camping World Truck Series raced at Chicagoland, although the Truck Series had previously raced at Chicago Motor Speedway in 2000 and 2001. The race was run on Friday night under the lights. It was paired with an ARCA RE/MAX Series race that was run earlier the same day, and an IndyCar Series race run the following day.

From 2016 to 2017, it served as the final race of NASCAR's "regular season" for the Truck Series; following the race, the top eight drivers in points standings advance to the seven-race NASCAR Camping World Truck Series playoffs. In 2017, the race was known as TheHouse.com 225. It moved to a midseason date in 2018 under the Overton's 225.

In 2019, Camping World took over naming rights.

The 2020 race was canceled due to the COVID-19 pandemic. It was dropped entirely from the NASCAR schedule in 2021.

== Past winners ==
| Year | Date | No. | Driver | Team | Manufacturer | Race Distance | | Race Time | Average Speed (mph) | Report | Ref |
| Year | Date | No. | Driver | Team | Manufacturer | Laps | Miles (km) | Race Time | Average Speed (mph) | Report | Ref |
|---|---|---|---|---|---|---|---|---|---|---|---|
| 2009 | August 28 | 51 | Kyle Busch | Billy Ballew Motorsports | Toyota | 150 | 225 (362.102) | 1:53:13 | 119.293 | Report | |
| 2010 | August 27 | 18 | Kyle Busch | Kyle Busch Motorsports | Toyota | 154* | 231 (371.758) | 1:44:31 | 132.61 | Report | |
| 2011 | September 16 | 3 | Austin Dillon | Richard Childress Racing | Chevrolet | 150 | 225 (362.102) | 1:36:38 | 139.703 | Report | |
| 2012 | July 21 | 31 | James Buescher | Turner Motorsports | Chevrolet | 150 | 225 (362.102) | 1:53:06 | 119.363 | Report | |
| 2013 | September 13 | 51 | Kyle Busch | Kyle Busch Motorsports | Toyota | 150 | 225 (362.102) | 1:48:42 | 124.195 | Report | |
| 2014 | September 13* | 51 | Kyle Busch | Kyle Busch Motorsports | Toyota | 150 | 225 (362.102) | 1:34:29 | 142.882 | Report | |
| 2015 | September 19* | 8 | John Hunter Nemechek | SWM-NEMCO Motorsports | Chevrolet | 150 | 225 (362.102) | 1:51:50 | 120.715 | Report | |
| 2016 | September 16 | 18 | Kyle Busch | Kyle Busch Motorsports | Toyota | 151* | 226.5 (364.516) | 2:05:05 | 108.648 | Report | |
| 2017 | September 15 | 21 | Johnny Sauter | GMS Racing | Chevrolet | 150 | 225 (362.102) | 1:49:32 | 123.25 | Report | |
| 2018 | June 29 | 16 | Brett Moffitt | Hattori Racing Enterprises | Toyota | 150 | 225 (362.102) | 1:53:07 | 119.346 | Report | |
| 2019 | June 28 | 24 | Brett Moffitt | GMS Racing | Chevrolet | 150 | 225 (362.102) | 1:49:16 | 123.551 | Report | |
| 2020* | June 19 | Race canceled due to the COVID-19 pandemic | | | | | | | | | |

- 2010 and 2016: This race was extended due to a NASCAR Overtime finish.
- 2014 and 2015: Race moved from Friday to Saturday due to rain.
- 2020: Race canceled and moved to Kansas due to the COVID-19 pandemic.

=== Multiple winners (drivers) ===
| # Wins | Driver | Years won |
|---|---|---|
| 5 | Kyle Busch | 2009, 2010, 2013, 2014, 2016 |
| 2 | Brett Moffitt | 2018, 2019 |

=== Multiple winners (teams) ===
| # Wins | Team | Years won |
|---|---|---|
| 4 | Kyle Busch Motorsports | 2010, 2013, 2014, 2016 |
| 2 | GMS Racing | 2017, 2019 |

=== Manufacturer wins ===
| # Wins | Make | Years won |
|---|---|---|
| 6 | (Japan) Toyota | 2009, 2010, 2013, 2014, 2016, 2018 |
| 5 | (United States) Chevrolet | 2011, 2012, 2015, 2017, 2019 |
