= Gander Mountain =

US based outdoors equipment retailer

- The last Gander Mountain logo (2003–2017)
- Formerly: Gander Mountain, Inc. (1960–2017); Gander Outdoors, Inc. (2017–2020); Gander RV (2020–2022)
- Type: Subsidiary
- Industry: Retail
- Founded: 1960; 66 years ago, in Wilmot, Wisconsin
- Defunct: 2022; 4 years ago
- Fate: Converted into Camping World
- Successor: Camping World
- Headquarters: Saint Paul, Minnesota
- Number of locations: 162 (March 2017)
- Key people: Marcus Lemonis, CEO
- Products: Apparel, Equipment, & Accessories for: Hunting, Fishing, Camping, Outdoor Recreation
- Revenue: ▲US$ 1.32 billion (2016) ▲US$ 1.065 billion (2008)
- Net income: ▲US$ −15.5 million (2008)
- Total assets: ▼US$ 613.1 million (2008)
- Total equity: ▼US$ 179.9 million (2008)
- Number of employees: 5,606 (2,325 full-time) (January 2009)
- Parent: Camping World (2017–2022)
- Website: Archived official website at the Wayback Machine (archived March 3, 2010)

Gander Mountain, later known as Gander Outdoors and Gander RV, headquartered in St. Paul, Minnesota, was a retail network of stores for hunting, fishing, camping, and other outdoor recreation products and services.

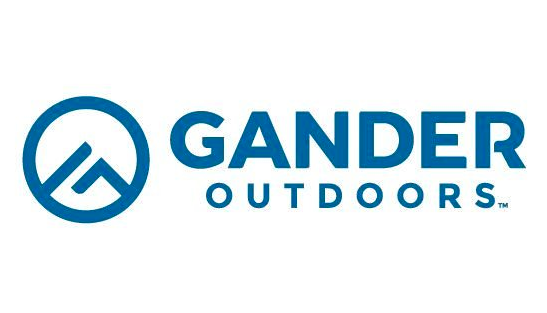
Gander Outdoors logo (2017-2020)

Gander RV logo (2020-2022)

== History ==
Gander Mountain Incorporated began as a catalog-based in Wilmot, Wisconsin. Wilmot is located near Gander Mountain, the highest point in Lake County, Illinois, a short distance across the state line. As of March 2017 the chain had 162 stores in 27 states, making it the largest chain of outdoors specialty stores in the United States.

In the 1990s the company sought bankruptcy protection and began to rebuild its business once it emerged. In 1996 it sold its mail order division and then later acquired the watersports company Overton's in order to relaunch its mail order business.

The company filed for bankruptcy in March 2017 with plans to close 32 stores. On April 28, 2017, Camping World Holdings was announced as the winner of the bankruptcy auction of Gander Mountain. On May 5, 2017, Gander Mountain announced via its website the upcoming closure of all of its locations. The new owner, Marcus Lemonis, has clarified through his account on Twitter that the bankruptcy court has sold the inventory and is liquidating it. Not all stores will remain closed if a new lease can be worked out with each landlord. On January 4, 2018, Camping World announced an official list of stores that will reopen under the new Gander Outdoors branding, where 69 stores will open.

On May 1, 2017, Camping World Holdings, Inc., acquired Gander Mountain at auction for an estimated $35.4 million. As part of the deal, Camping World was obligated to operate a minimum of 17 Gander Mountain stores. As of 2018, Gander Outdoors had 59 open locations. The revamp included incorporating Camping World merchandise at select Gander Mountain locations.

From 2019 to 2020, Gander Outdoors replaced its parent company Camping World as the title sponsor of NASCAR's Truck Series.

== Operations ==
Gander Mountain offered sportswear, hunting, fishing, camping, and other related outdoor recreation equipment. Gander Mountain was formerly traded on NASDAQ but was turned into a private company under the majority ownership of David Pratt and the Erickson family, which own Holiday gas stations. David C. Pratt was elected chairman of the board in December 2006. Pratt was elected as a director of Gander Mountain in August 2005 and named vice chairman of the board in December 2005. Jay Tibbets was chief executive officer.

== Locations ==
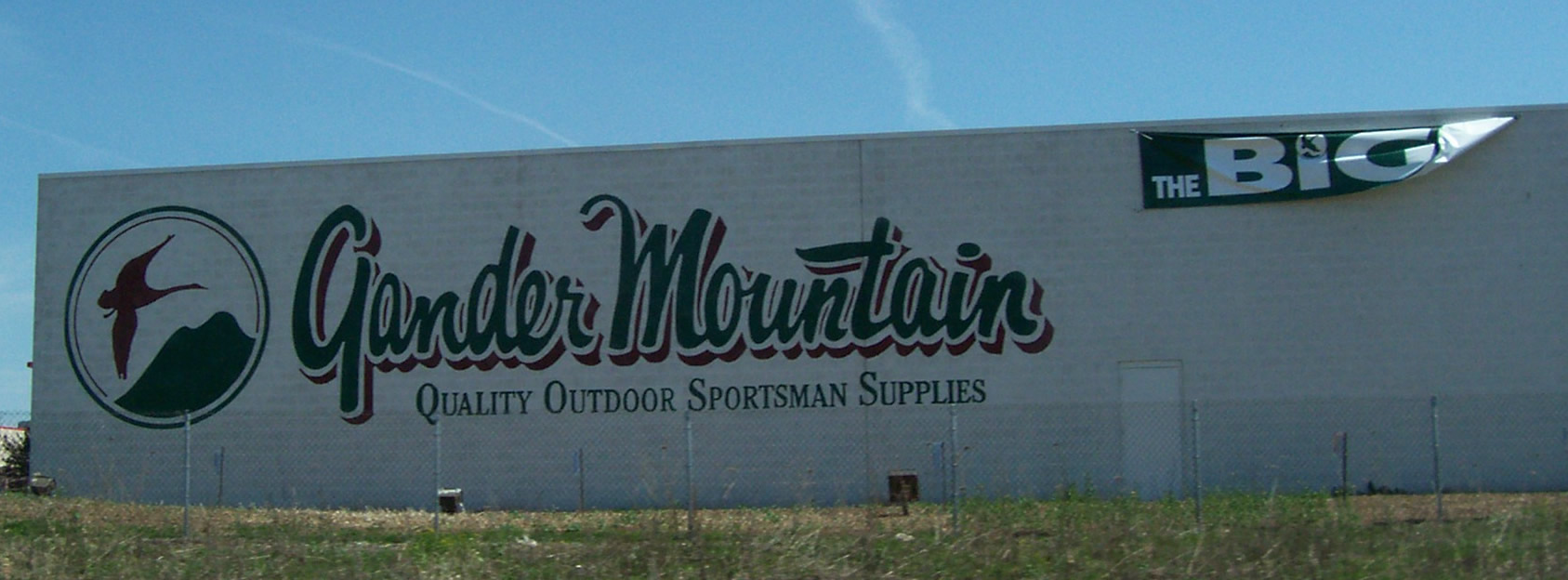
Gander Mountain store in Appleton, Wisconsin, using 1980's–2004 era logo.

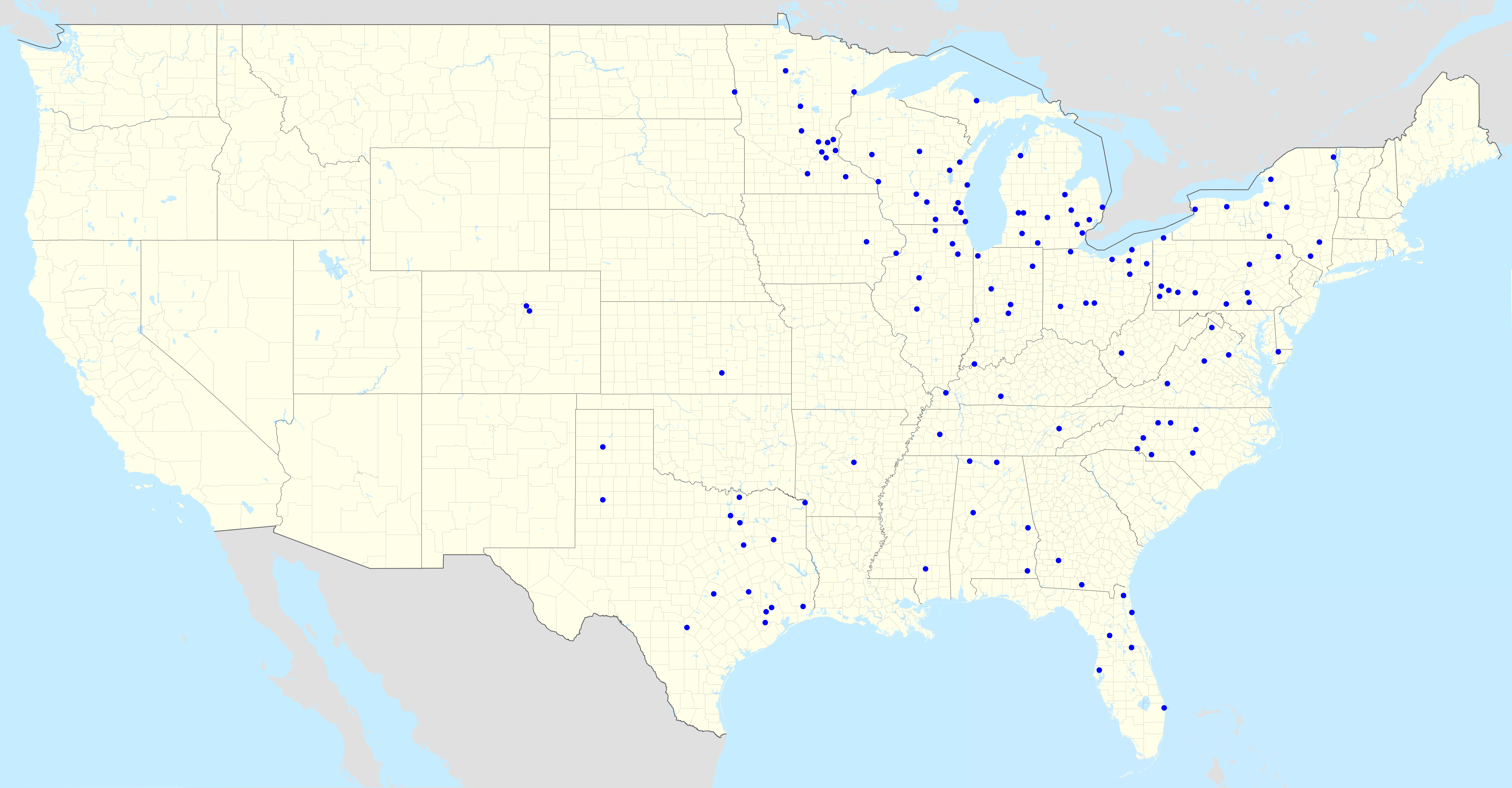
Map of Gander Mountain stores.

Gander Mountain's stores ranged in size from 50,000 to 120,000 square feet and offered an outdoor esthetic. Physically, and visually, the stores had wider shopping aisles, high-joist ceilings, brick and stone accents, log-wrapped columns, and other wilderness related decorations.

Gander Mountain online store officially opened in August 2008.

Following the closure of all Gander Mountain stores, 69 stores in 22 states reopened under the Gander Outdoors name.

== Gun sales ==
Gander Mountain called itself the top seller of new and used firearms in the United States. Starting in 2010, it had opened six Gander Mountain Academy and Firearms Supercenters, originally called “gun world”, where it estimated that over 250,000 people had received training.

== Legal ==
Gander Mountain sold its mail order business to Cabela's in 1996 with a no-compete clause. In 2007 it won a lawsuit brought by Cabela's to resume online sales. On December 6, 2007, the company announced it purchased boating and watersports catalog company Overton's for $70 million (~$102 million in 2024) from a private-equity firm. The purchase of Overton's, based in Greenville, North Carolina, helped Gander Mountain's transition back into direct marketing.

In December 2013, Gander Mountain brought suit against Cabela's claiming that the competitor was illegally using domain names related to its business. The lawsuit accused Cabela's of "violating federal and state statutes as well as common law." Additionally Gander Mountain claimed that Cabela's was in violation of the federal Anticybersquatting Consumer Protection Act, trademark infringement and trademark dilution.

=== Bankruptcy ===
In March 2017, Gander Mountain voluntarily filed for Chapter 11 bankruptcy. The retail chain decided to close 32 stores in 11 states. The company then began to seek a buyer; however, there was initially limited interest from potential buyers. Store closures began in April; the affected stores held inventory liquidation sales.
