= Bob Farrell (motivational speaker) =

American motivational speaker

- Born: December 10, 1927; New York City, U.S.
- Died: August 14, 2015 (aged 87); Vancouver, Washington, U.S.
- Occupations: Motivational speaker, entrepreneur
- Years active: 1945–2015
- Spouse: Ramona Farrell (1946-2015; his death)

Robert E. Farrell (December 10, 1927 – August 14, 2015) was an American motivational speaker, author, and founder of Farrell's Ice Cream Parlour and Restaurant.

== Early life ==
Farrell was born in Brooklyn, New York in 1927. His grandfather, Patrick Farrell, owned an auto parts company which his father later ran. Following the stock market crash in 1929 Farrell's father committed suicide. His mother placed 4-year-old Bob and his sister in an orphanage for five years, taking them back when she remarried in 1934.

In 1945 he dropped out of high school to join the Air Force, remaining in the service for a year after the war. He met and married Ramona in 1946; they later had three daughters. He earned a business degree and took a job with Heinz Foods. After a year he became a salesman for Libby Foods.

== Ice cream ==
On September 13, 1963, he and his friend Ken McCarthy created Farrell's Ice Cream Parlour, an 1890s-themed ice cream parlor in Portland, Oregon. The first franchised location was in Salem, Oregon opened in 1965. The two men continued to open company locations and franchised locations until they sold the chain to Marriott Corporation in June 1972. Among other publicity stunts, he built the World's Largest Sundae (1,551 pounds (704 kg)) for the Guinness Book of World Records. Farrell's remained with the chain as president until 1975. The chain expanded to 120 locations by 1975, but then sales began declining; by 1990 almost all Farrell's locations had closed. In 2008 the chain was revived, with Farrell serving as an advisor to the new owners.

== Motivational speaker ==
While at Farrell's he developed a speech for new employees called Give 'em the Pickle!, based on a letter he received from a disappointed customer. He expanded this speech into a career as a speaker at motivational and employee-training events. In 2002, he put his Pickle speech to video, followed by The Leadership Pickles!

== Personal ==
Farrell was active for decades in Young Life. He resided in Vancouver, Washington until his death due to Alzheimer's disease on August 14, 2015.

== Recognition ==
In 1976 he received the Horatio Alger Award.
