= The Fixer (2025 American TV series) =

2025 American reality television series

- Genre: Reality television
- Presented by: Marcus Lemonis
- Country of origin: United States
- Original language: English
- No. of seasons: 1
- No. of episodes: 8

Production
- Executive producers: Eli Holzman; Aaron Saidman; Rebekah Fry; Marcus Lemonis
- Production companies: The Intellectual Property Corporation; Marcus Entertainment

Original release
- Network: Fox
- Release: July 18, 2025 – present

The Fixer is an American reality television series starring entrepreneur Marcus Lemonis that premiered on Fox on July 18, 2025. The series follows Lemonis as he visits small businesses facing operational and branding challenges, diagnosing problems and guiding owners through fast-paced turnarounds. Produced by The Intellectual Property Corporation and Marcus Entertainment, the first season aired in summer 2025 on Friday nights and introduced companies such as Perspirology, Jazz Audio, Fluffology, Popinsanity, Tipsy Tie Dye, and Kreme & Krumb.

== Premise ==
In each episode, Marcus Lemonis visits a small business that is struggling with growth, margins, or messaging. After a rapid assessment of finances, operations, product, and branding, he proposes targeted changes ranging from pricing and packaging to workflow, merchandising, and digital strategy and helps the owners implement fixes on a tight timeline. The format emphasizes hands-on coaching and measurable improvements by the end of the episode.

== Production ==
Fox announced The Fixer on June 11, 2025, scheduling it for Friday nights in summer 2025. The series is produced by The Intellectual Property Corporation (IPC) in association with Marcus Entertainment, with Eli Holzman, Aaron Saidman, Rebekah Fry, and Marcus Lemonis serving as executive producers. Early listings and episode information were carried by industry guides ahead of the launch.

== Episodes ==
No.	Title	Original release date	Prod. code	U.S. viewers (millions)	Rating (18–49)
1	"Perspirology"	July 18, 2025	FIX-101	0.50	0.1
2	"Jazz Audio"	July 18, 2025	FIX-102	0.50	0.1
3	"Fluffology"	July 25, 2025	FIX-103	0.60	0.1
4	"Popinsanity"	July 25, 2025	FIX-104	0.60	0.1
5	"Tipsy Tie Dye"	August 1, 2025	FIX-105	0.52	0.1
6	"Kreme & Krumb"	August 1, 2025	FIX-106	0.52	0.1
7	"Good Quality Human"	August 8, 2025	FIX-107	0.49	0.1
8	"Healthy Italia"	August 8, 2025	FIX-108	0.49	0.1

== Reception ==
The July 18, 2025, premiere drew a low 0.55 million viewers and a 0.06 rating among adults 18–49, according to The TV Ratings Guide. On August 1, 2025, The Fixer maintained a similarly modest performance in daily coverage by TV Series Finale.
