= The Partner (2017 TV series) =

- Genre: Reality show
- Presented by: Marcus Lemonis
- Country of origin: United States
- Original language: English
- No. of seasons: 1
- No. of episodes: 5

Production
- Executive producers: Amber Mazzola; Marcus Lemonis
- Production companies: Machete Productions; Marcus Lemonis Productions LLC

Original release
- Network: CNBC
- Release: March 7 – April 4, 2017

Related
- The Profit

The Partner is an American reality television show that is broadcast on CNBC. The series features entrepreneur Marcus Lemonis auditioning ten candidates to help run businesses Lemonis has invested in during his other CNBC program The Profit.

Candidates will be auditioned over a six-week period, with one being selected to be Lemonis' partner. The winner will receive a three-year contract including a salary of US$163,000 and a 1% equity stake in Lemonis' portfolio. The series drew comparisons to another business themed reality format The Apprentice.

The series was announced on January 14, 2016, and was originally scheduled to debut in Summer 2016. However, the series would debut on March 7, 2017.

== Contestants ==
Name	Occupation	Current Residence	Result
Julianna Reed	Non-Profit Manager	Santa Monica, California	Became The Partner
Peilin Pratt	Candy Distribution Company Owner	Manhattan Beach, California	Eliminated Episode Five
Erin Cobb	Entrepreneur	Seattle, Washington	Eliminated Episode Five
Buffie Purselle	Tax Practice Owner	Atlanta, Georgia	Eliminated Episode Four
Chuck Brewer	Restaurant Owner	Indianapolis, Indiana	Eliminated Episode Two
Billy Canu	Marketing Director	San Diego, California	Eliminated Episode One
Carrie Chitsey	Technology Consultant	Austin, Texas	Eliminated Episode One
Michael Graves	Boutique Marketer	New York, New York	Eliminated Episode One
Ricardo Martinez	Managing Director	Atlanta, Georgia	Eliminated Episode One
Stephanie Sievers	Credit Union CEO	Shreveport, Louisiana	Eliminated Episode One

== Episodes ==
No.	Title	Original release date	U.S. viewers
1	"Ten Candidates, One Partner"	March 7, 2017	363,000
Marcus interviews ten candidates at Chicago's Drake Hotel and chooses five to move forward.
2	"What's Your Story?"	March 14, 2017	344,000
Marcus tests the character of the candidates.
3	"Tripwires & Trapdoors"	March 21, 2017	315,000
Marcus tests the teamwork of the candidates.
4	"A Day in the Life of Marcus Lemonis"	March 28, 2017	320,000
Marcus tests the candidates' ability to analyze businesses that he is already invested in.
5	"People, Process, Product, Partner"	April 4, 2017	294,000
Marcus asks the final two candidates to analyze a business that he is considering investing in and present their findings and recommendations to him. Following this he selects one candidate as his Partner.

== See also ==
- The Apprentice
- The Profit
