= Trailer Life =

Magazine that reviews recreational vehicles

- Categories: Travel
- Frequency: Monthly
- Publisher: Good Sam Enterprises
- Total circulation: 213,839 (2011)
- First issue: July 1941
- Country: United States
- Based in: Ventura, California
- Website: trailerlife.com
- ISSN: 0041-0780

Trailer Life was a magazine that reviewed recreational vehicles, provided articles on travel trailers and towing as well a focus on the outdoors, recent trends and popular destinations.

== History ==
Trailer Life was founded in July 1941 as Western Trailer Life, in California.

In 1958, Los Angeles advertising executive Art Rouse purchased the magazine. In 1992, Trailer Life Enterprises became part of the umbrella company Affinity Group Inc., since renamed Good Sam Enterprises.
