= Good Sam Club =

Organization of RV owners

- Formation: 1966; 60 years ago
- Founder: Art Rouse
- Type: Organization of recreational vehicle owners
- Headquarters: Bowling Green, Kentucky
- Members: Over 1.8 million, world's largest RV organization
- Owner: Good Sam Enterprises
- Parent organization: Good Sam Enterprises
- Affiliations: Camping World, NASCAR
- Website: www.goodsam.com/club

The Good Sam Club is an international organization of recreational vehicle (RV) owners and the largest organization of RV owners in the world. It is focused upon making RVing safer and more enjoyable, also, saving money for members through club-endorsed benefits and services. It states that it has over 2.185 million members. It was founded in 1966, and is currently owned by Good Sam Enterprises. The organization is affiliated with RV parks and campgrounds.

== Overview ==
=== History ===
Credited as the founder of the Good Sam Club is Art Rouse, founder of TL Enterprises, a California-based publishing company responsible for Trailer Life magazine and MotorHome magazine. Rouse and his two sons acquired the organization in 1968 and further developed member benefits and RV-related services for which the club is known. Rouse sold TL Enterprises in the 1980s and died on June 19, 2007, following head injuries suffered as a result of a fall, at 89 years old.

=== Today ===
Good Sam Club is based in Englewood, Colorado. The organization is currently owned by Good Sam Enterprises, which also owns Camping World (an American corporation specializing in selling parts and services for recreational vehicles and supplies for camping), Coast to Coast Resorts, Trailer Life Publications, MotorHome Publications and the Good Sam RV Travel Guide & Campground Directory. The organization also offers additional services such as roadside assistance, RV insurance, and RV extended warranties for additional fees. In 2022 Good Sam clubs across America were closed by Camping World executives.

=== Membership ===
In 1985, the club had over 450,000 members; today, it has over 2.185 million members.

=== Nomenclature ===
The club's name comes from the Bible parable of the Good Samaritan, which tells of a traveler from the region of Samaria who helped a person along the road who had been robbed and beaten.

== RV park affiliations ==
In 2017, there were over 2,100 RV parks and campgrounds affiliated with the Good Sam organization in which club members receive a 10% discount on the nightly rate for staying in their parks. These RV parks have to meet a minimum standard of services and appearance to be considered for association.

Good Sam also publishes information to help members find parks that provide stated levels of services.

== NASCAR ==
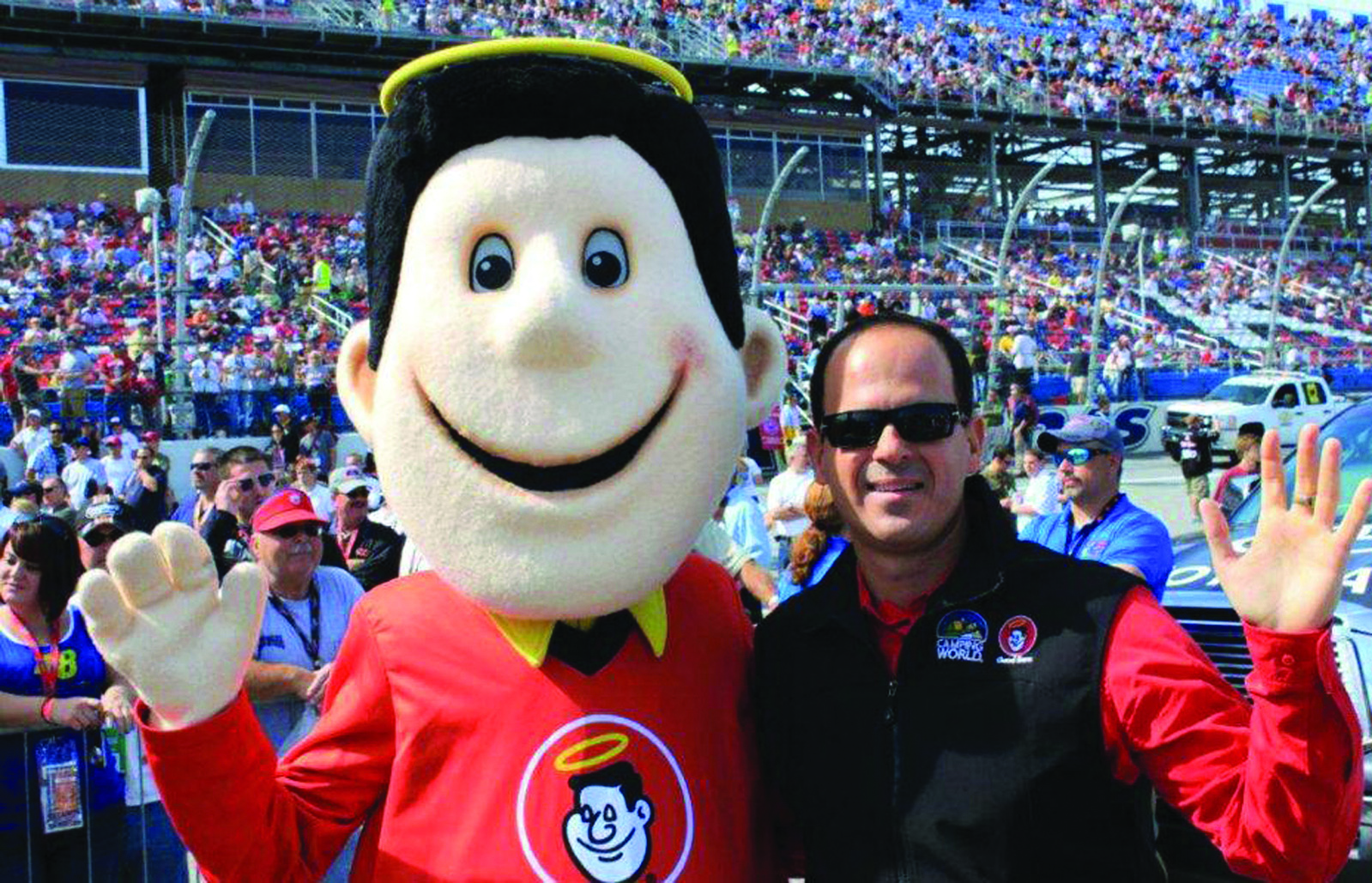
Marcus Lemonis at the NASCAR Good Sam Club 500 in 2012

The club sponsored the NASCAR Sprint Cup Series race Good Sam Club 500 at Talladega Superspeedway and the Camping World Truck Series' Good Sam Roadside Assistance Carolina 200 at Rockingham Speedway.

== See also ==
- Affinity Group Inc.
- Camping
- Camping World
- Membership campground
- Snowbird
- Stephen Adams
