= Goldbelly =

American food-ordering company

Goldbelly, Inc.
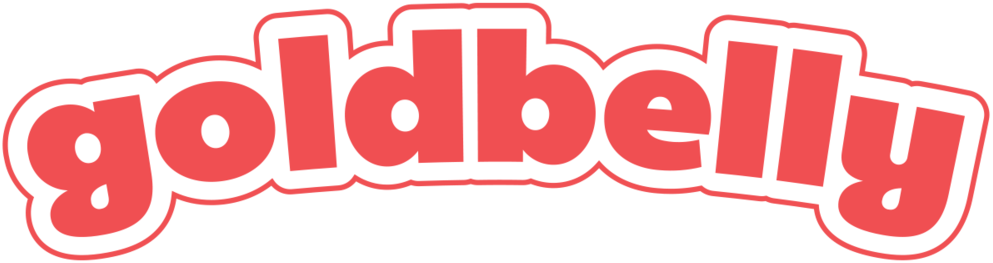
- Company type: Private company
- Website type: Online marketplace
- Founded: 2013
- Headquarters: New York, New York, United States
- Area served: United States
- Founders: Joe Ariel; Trevor Stow; Vanessa Torrivilla; Joel Gillman
- Industry: Online food ordering
- Website: www.goldbelly.com
- Current status: Active

Goldbelly is an online marketplace where customers can order gourmet food from more than 1000 restaurants in the United States. The ordered food sometimes requires preparation and cooking.

== History ==
Founded as "Goldbely" by Joe Ariel, the company began its operation from a townhouse in Noe Valley in San Francisco with a four-person team of Ariel, Trevor Stow, Vanessa Torrivilla, and Joel Gillman. The site was accepted into Y Combinator in 2013. Time magazine named Goldbelly one of the 50 Best Websites of 2013. In 2013, Goldbelly closed $3 million in seed funding led by Intel Capital.

In 2017, the company moved its headquarters from San Francisco to New York City. In October 2018, the company changed its name from Goldbely (with one L) to Goldbelly (with two Ls), raised $20 million in Series B funding led by Enlightened Hospitality Investments, the fund formed by Danny Meyer's Union Square Hospitality Group, and had Danny Meyer join the company's advisory board. In the same year, it acquired its competitor, FoodyDirect.

In 2021, Goldbelly announced that it raised $100 million in new funding. 400 new vendors were added to Goldbelly's offerings at the start of the COVID-19 pandemic.
