= Good Sam Enterprises =

Recreational vehicle-related company

Good Sam Enterprises, LLC
- Type: Private
- Industry: Recreational vehicles
- Predecessor: Affinity Group, Inc.
- Founded: 1935; 91 years ago
- Founder: Stephen Adams
- Headquarters: Lincolnshire, Illinois, U.S.
- Key people: Marcus Lemonis, Chairman & CEO
- Revenue: ▲US$ 562.2 million
- Number of employees: 1,621 (2018)
- Parent: Camping World Holdings, Inc.
- Website: www.goodsam.com

Good Sam Enterprises (formerly Affinity Group or AGI) is a provider of membership clubs, as well as subscription-based products, services and publications, targeted toward recreational vehicle and other outdoor enthusiasts in the United States and Canada. Additionally, the company operates 187 stores of Camping World, a leading RV-related specialty retailer, and RV.net, an RV-focused website.

The company is the composite of several distinct businesses acquired through a leveraged buildup in the 1980s and 1990s and traces its earliest predecessors back to 1935.

The company is based in Lincolnshire, Illinois with major operations in Englewood, Colorado and is owned by Camping World.

== History ==
AGI's antecedents date back to 1935, with the first publication of Woodall's Travel Trailer Magazine, followed by the publication of the first Woodall's directory in 1948. The Good Sam Club was founded in 1966, the same year that the first Camping World location opened in Bowling Green, Kentucky. Coast to Coast Resorts (“Coast to Coast”) and the Golf Card were introduced in 1972 and 1974, respectively.

Historical Affinity Group logo

Last Affinity Group logo

On December 23, 1988, the direct predecessor of AGI acquired a company called American Bakeries Company, owned by investor Stephen Adams, for approximately $138 million. Adams was a noted private equity investor in the 1980s completing rollups of billboard assets to form Adams Outdoor Advertising and he also owns or has owned various banking, bottling, publishing as well as television and radio companies. At the time of the merger, the sole operating assets of American Bakeries Company were TL Enterprises, Inc. and Camp Coast to Coast, Inc. These entities consisted of what is today the Good Sam Club, Coast to Coast, AGI's subscription-based products and services business and the Company's RV-related publications, with the exception of the Woodall's titles.

From 1990 through 1997, the Company made a number of significant acquisitions that expanded AGI's scale and presence. In 1990, the Company acquired Golf Card International, Inc. for approximately $18 million. Subsequently, in May 1994, AGI acquired Woodall Publishing Company, L.P. and Woodall World of Travel, L.P. (collectively Woodall's) for approximately $11.5 million.

In October 1993, AGI completed a leveraged recapitalization consisting of a $50 million credit facility and a $120 million of 11½% AGI senior subordinated notes due 2003. As part of the recapitalization, Stephen Adams increased his fully diluted ownership from approximately 71% to approximately 97%.

In 1995, AGI acquired San Francisco Thrift and Loan (founded in 1982) and the company's headquarters were relocated to Ventura, California. In 1997 the bank was renamed Affinity Bank and in 1999, AGI transferred ownership to Affinity Bank Holdings, Inc. a separate entity controlled by Adams.

U.S. bank regulators closed Affinity Bank of Ventura, California on August 28, 2009. The Federal Deposit Insurance Corp said Affinity had $1 billion in assets and about $922 million in deposits. Pacific Western Bank of San Diego agreed to assume all the deposits of Affinity. Affinity Bank had 10 branches. The FDIC estimates Affinity's failure will cost its deposit insurance fund $254 million.

In March 1997, as part of the Company's $130 million offering of the holding company notes due 2007, AGI acquired Camping World, Inc. and Ehlert Publishing for approximately $123 million and $22.3 million, respectively.

Subsequently, the Company focused on integrating its operations and repaying indebtedness. In October 1998, the Company issued $200 million of senior secured credit facilities to repay its then existing senior credit facility as well as the AGI Subordinated Notes, and in December 2001 the Company completed a $52.3 million property sale / leaseback transaction, the proceeds of which were used to repay senior indebtedness.

On August 15, 2009, AGI failed to make a $6.2 million interest payment to bondholders, and Standard & Poors subsequently lowered AGI's credit rating to D. Standard & Poor reported that they had taken this view because bondholders will be receiving less than par value for the notes and because of the company's highly leveraged financial profile, weak operating outlook, and limited liquidity given the near-term maturity of its senior credit facility. In May 2011, AGI announced that it was changing the company's name to Good Sam Enterprises. Ehlert Publishing was spun off by 2013 as a separate company under the control of the Adams family.

In early October 2016, Camping World raised $251 million in an initial public offering. The 11.4 million shares sold for $22 each. Marcus Lemonis co-owns the company with private equity firm Crestview Partners and plans to retain "substantial control" through his ownership of ML Acquisition and ML R.V. Group.

In late October 2016, Good Sam Enterprises acquired five consumer tradeshows from Odyssey Management, expanding its media and events activities, according to Camping World Holdings.

=== Strategic review ===
In January 2024, Camping World Holdings announced it was reviewing potential strategic alternatives for its Good Sam business, including a possible sale, spin-off, or other disposition, and stated that no decision had been made and no deadline had been set for the review process.

=== Financial partnerships ===
In December 2025, Good Sam announced an expanded partnership with Octane Lending to support branded financing ("Good Sam Powered by Octane") across Camping World's dealership locations and digital purchasing platforms; the announcement also said Good Sam participated in Octane's Series F funding round.

=== Programs and offerings ===
An investor presentation describing the Good Sam business lists program categories that include emergency assistance (such as roadside assistance and travel assistance), financial protection programs (including extended service plans and an insurance agency), tire and maintenance programs, and campground/destination and loyalty products (including memberships, travel guides, and Coast to Coast Resorts). Good Sam offers a variety of products and services for RV owners and outdoor travelers, including roadside assistance and protection products, insurance programs, campground and destination services, and rewards programs targeted at members of the Good Sam Club and affiliated networks.

== See also ==
- Good Sam Club
- Camping World
- Trailer Life
- Gander Mountain
- Stephen Adams
