= The Profit (TV series) =

American reality television series

- Lemonis sitting on a throne of bills
- Genre: Reality show
- Presented by: Marcus Lemonis
- Country of origin: United States
- Original language: English
- No. of seasons: 8
- No. of episodes: 72

Production
- Executive producer: Amber Mazzola
- Production company: Machete Productions

Original release
- Network: CNBC
- Release: July 30, 2013 – September 28, 2021

Related
- The Partner

The Profit is an American documentary-style reality television show broadcast on CNBC. In each episode, Marcus Lemonis typically offers a capital investment and his expertise to struggling small businesses in exchange for an ownership stake in the company, but a series of "Inside Look" episodes have commentary by Lemonis and executive producer Amber Mazzola as they watch past episodes. Some episodes simply show a business, city, or industry without any investment by Lemonis. The Partner is a spin-off series that aired in 2017, also featuring Lemonis.

Season 1 premiered on July 30, 2013; season 2 premiered on February 25, 2014. The second part of the second season returned October 2014. After a successful second season, with ratings going up 115% from the first season, the third season premiered on May 12, 2015. The Profit returned for a fourth season on August 23, 2016. A fifth season premiered on November 21, 2017 and started with a "recap" episode that looked back at different companies Lemonis had invested in and said whether they were a "win" or a "loss". The sixth season premiered on December 4, 2018. On October 14, 2019, it was announced that the seventh season was to premiere on November 5, 2019.

On September 28, 2021 Marcus Lemonis posted on his Twitter feed "2013 - 2021 thank you", indicating that season 8 would be the last season for the show.

== Production, spin-offs, and specials ==
Lemonis does not get paid by the production company, Machete Productions, nor do they help fund his investments. Occasional promotions for AT&T, Chase, and LegalZoom have appeared.

A 2017 spin-off, The Partner, featured Lemonis searching for a business partner to help run businesses featured in The Profit.

A special titled "The Profit in Cuba" aired on November 15, 2016; it featured Lemonis travelling to Cuba to explore new business opportunities in the country. It was watched by 478,000 viewers. Other specials looked at Puerto Rico and both the legal and illegal marijuana industries in California. Another special was titled "Top 10 Rules for Success".

On April 3, 2019, it was announced that a 90-minute original documentary titled The Profit: My Roots would air on April 9, 2019.

== Episodes ==
=== Season 1 (2013) ===
No.	Title	Location	Original offer	Outcome	Original release date	U.S. viewers (millions)	Follow-up
1	"1 800 Car Cash"	New York City, NY	$200,000 + licensing partnership for 1/3 of business	Deal	July 30, 2013	254,000	S2, Ep2; S2, Ep18; S3, Ep9
2	"Jacob Maarse Florists"	Pasadena, CA	$100,000 for 25% of profits	No Deal	August 6, 2013	173,000	S1, Ep6; S2, Ep18
3	"Planet Popcorn"	Newport Beach, CA	$200,000 for 50% of the business, 100% financial control	No Deal	August 13, 2013	248,000	S2, Ep16
4	"Eco-Me"	Pomona, CA	$500,000 for 20% of the business	Deal	August 20, 2013	248,000	TBA
5	"LA Dogworks"	Los Angeles, CA	$1,000,000 for 50% of the business, full operational control	No Deal	August 27, 2013	259,000	TBA
6	"Mr. Green Tea"	Keyport, NJ	$600,000 for 35% of the business	Deal	September 3, 2013	314,000	S2, Ep18; S3, E21

=== Season 2 (2014) ===
No.	Title	Location	Original offer	Outcome	Original release date	U.S. viewers (millions)	Follow-up
1	"Athans Motors"	Morton Grove, IL	$3,500,000 for 50% of the business	Deal	February 25, 2014	439,000	S2, Ep18
2	"A. Stein Meat Products"	Brooklyn, NY	$1,000,000 for 50% of the business	Partial Deal	March 4, 2014	441,000	S2, Ep18
3	"Michael Sena's Pro-Fit"	Dyer, IN	$50,000 for 50% of protein bar business, $250,000 for 75% of gym business	Partial Deal	March 11, 2014	488,000	S2, Ep18
4	"WorldWide Trailers"	Tampa, FL	$700,000 for 50% of the business	No Deal	March 18, 2014	497,000	S2, Ep18
5	"Skullduggery"	Anaheim, CA	$1,100,000 for 30% of the business, full financial control	No Deal	March 25, 2014	537,000	TBA
6	"Sweet Pete's"	Jacksonville, FL	$750,000 for 50% of the business	Deal	April 1, 2014	577,000	S3, Ep9; S3, E17; S2, Ep18
7	"Amazing Grapes"	Rancho Santa Margarita, CA	$300,000 for 51% of the business, 25% for staff	Deal	April 8, 2014	590,000	S3, E22
8	"Key West Key Lime Pie Co."	Key West, FL	$450,000 for 51% of the business	Deal	April 15, 2014	594,000	S3, Ep2
9	"Courage.b"	Greenwich, CT	$800,000 for 30% of the business	Deal	October 14, 2014	536,000	S3, Ep9
10	"Artistic Stitch"	Queens, NY	$660,000 for 50% of the business, full financial control forever	Partial Deal	October 21, 2014	702,000	S3, Ep2
11	"Swanson's Fish Market"	Fairfield, CT	$1,000,000 for purchase of the building, 0% of the business	No Deal	October 28, 2014	594,000	TBA
12	"Unique Salon & Spa"	Long Island, NY	$250,000 for 20% of the salon business, 51% of the product line	Deal	November 4, 2014	514,000	S3, Ep2
13	"West End Coffee Company"	Greenville, SC	$200,000 for 51% of the business	No Deal	November 11, 2014	640,000	TBA
14	"Coopersburg Sports"	Coopersburg, PA	$630,000 for 30% of the business + 3% royalty	Deal	November 18, 2014	586,000	S3, Ep2
15	"Shuler's Bar-B-Que"	Latta, SC	$500,000 for 40% of biscuit distribution, 40% of restaurant business	Deal	November 25, 2014	579,000	S3, E22
16	"ASL Sign Sales & Service"	Surfside Beach, SC	No offer made	TBA	December 2, 2014	647,000	TBA
17	"My Big Fat Greek Gyro"	McMurray, PA	$350,000 for 55% of the business	Deal	December 9, 2014	748,000	S3, Ep20
18	"A Progress Report"	TBA	TBA	TBA	December 16, 2014	743,000	TBA

=== Season 3 (2015–16) ===
No.	Title	Location	Original offer	Outcome	Original release date	U.S. viewers (millions)	Follow-up
1	"SJC Drums"	Southbridge, MA	$400,000 for 33% of the business	Deal	May 12, 2015	408,000	S3, E22
2	"Progress Reports"	TBA	TBA	TBA	May 19, 2015	398,000	TBA
3	"Tonnie's Minis"	New York City, NY	$125,000 for 25% of the company	Deal	May 26, 2015	442,000	TBA
4	"Standard Burger"	Staten Island, NY	$130,000 for 30% of the company	Deal	June 2, 2015	741,000	S3, Ep14
5	"Fuelfood"	West Palm Beach, FL	$300,000 for 51% of the company	No Deal	June 16, 2015	450,000	TBA
6	"Grafton Furniture"	Miami, FL	$1,500,000 for 45% of the company, full financial control	Deal	June 23, 2015	708,000	S3, E22; S4, Ep7
7	"Precise Graphix"	Emmaus, PA	$270,000 for 33.3% of the company + 100% control over all decisions	Deal	June 30, 2015	690,000	TBA
8	"The Lano Company"	Kansas City, MO	$500,000 for 30% of the company	Deal	July 7, 2015	612,000	TBA
9	"A Progress Report #3"	TBA	TBA	TBA	July 14, 2015	526,000	TBA
10	"Bentley's Corner Barkery"	Chicago metro area, IL	$400,000 for 25% of the business + $1.3M for acquisitions (Total 40%)	Deal	October 28, 2015	1,922,000	S5, Ep6
11	"Blues Jean Bar"	San Francisco, CA	$900,000 for 50% of the business	Deal	November 10, 2015	489,000	TBA
12	"Kensington Garden Rooms"	Hilmar, CA	$150,000 for 12%, 10% to staff	Deal	November 17, 2015	622,000	TBA
13.1	"Da Lobsta"	Chicago, IL	$210,000 for 51% of the business	No Deal	November 24, 2015	505,000	TBA
13.2	"Betty's Pie Whole"	Encinitas, CA	$75,000 for 25% of the business	Deal	November 24, 2015	505,000	TBA
14	"Showdown at Standard Burger"	Staten Island, NY	TBA	TBA	December 1, 2015	710,000	TBA
15	"Wick'ed"	Burbank, CA	$200,000 for 33% of the business	Deal	December 8, 2015	667,000	TBA
16	"Kota Longboards"	Denver, CO	$300,000 for 40% of the business	No Deal	December 15, 2015	356,000	TBA
17	"Vision Quest"	Ronkonkoma, NY	$375,000 for 50% of the business	Deal	January 5, 2016	540,000	TBA
18	"Inkkas Shoes"	Brooklyn, NY	$750,000 for 51% of the business	Deal	January 19, 2016	605,000	TBA
19	"240sweet"	Columbus, IN	$100,000 for 46% of the business	No Deal	January 26, 2016	697,000	TBA
20.1	"Farmgirl Flowers"	San Francisco, CA	$1,000,000 for 20% of the business & $500,000 Credit for Facilities	No Deal	February 2, 2016	679,000	TBA
20.2	"My Big Fat Greek Gyro (follow-up)"	TBA	TBA	TBA	February 2, 2016	679,000	TBA
21	"Growing Pains at Mr. Green Tea"	Keyport, NJ	TBA	TBA	February 9, 2016	577,000	TBA
22	"A Progress Report #4"	TBA	TBA	TBA	February 16, 2016	668,000	TBA

=== Season 4 (2016–17) ===
No.	Title	Location	Original offer	Outcome	Original release date	U.S. viewers (millions)
1	"Farrell's Ice Cream Parlour Restaurants"	Southern CA	$750,000 for 51% of the business	Deal	August 23, 2016	530,000
2	"DiLascia"	Los Angeles, CA	$200,000 for 50% of the business	Deal	August 30, 2016	452,000
3	"The Soup Market"	Milwaukee, WI	$315,000 for 50% of the business	No Deal	September 6, 2016	542,000
4	"Flex Watches"	Los Angeles, CA	$400,000 for 40% of the business	Deal	September 13, 2016	488,000
5	"Honest Foods"	Chicago, IL	$300,000 for 33% of the business	Deal	September 20, 2016	406,000
6	"Murchison-Hume"	Los Angeles, CA	$250,000 for 30% of the business and 70% of the trademark "Best in Show"	No Deal	September 27, 2016	437,000
7	"Pacific Hospitality"	Los Angeles, CA	$300,000 for 40% of the business (together with Grafton Furniture)	Deal	October 4, 2016	384,000
8	"Tea2Go"	Texas	$350,000 for 70% of the business	Partial deal	October 11, 2016	532,000
9	"Bowery Kitchen Supplies"	New York, NY	$350,000 for 40% of the business. Counteroffer of $350,000 for 33%	Deal	October 18, 2016	436,000
Special	"The Profit in Cuba"	Cuba	TBA	TBA	November 15, 2016	N/A
10	"Los Gemelos"	Port Chester, NY	$150,000 for 1/3 of a new business entity, owner gets 1/3 of the new business, 1/3 to George Lopez (for his endorsement & referral)	Deal	November 22, 2016	466,000
11	"Susana Monaco"	New York, NY	$600,000 for 50% of the business	Deal	November 29, 2016	475,000
12	"Swim by Chuck Handy"	North Miami Beach, FL	$600,000 for 55% of the business	Deal	June 6, 2017	431,000
13	"Windward Board Sports"	Chicago, IL	$500,000 for 50% of the business	Deal	June 13, 2017	399,000
14	"Ashtae Products"	Greensboro, NC	$300,000 for 25% of the business	Deal	June 20, 2017	513,000
15	"Overtone Acoustics"	Orlando, FL	$200,000 for 40% of the business	Deal	June 27, 2017	428,000
16	"Bodhi Leaf Coffee Traders"	Orange, CA	$1,750,000 for 30% of the business & 10% to the Bodhi Red Beard team.	Deal	July 11, 2017	379,000
17	"Hip Pops"	Fort Lauderdale, FL	$100,000 for 50% of the business	No Deal	July 18, 2017	455,000
18	"Zoe's Chocolate Co."	Waynesboro, PA	$200,000 for 40% of the business	Deal	July 25, 2017	539,000
19	"Top 10 Rules for Success"	TBA	TBA	TBA	August 1, 2017	N/A
20	"Marijuana Millions"	CA	TBA	TBA	August 8, 2017	529,000
In this special episode, Marcus shows how the legal pot industry will change California.

=== Season 5 (2017–18) ===
No.	Title	Location	Original offer	Outcome	Original release date	U.S. viewers (millions)
1	"Biggest Wins and Most Heartbreaking Losses"	TBA	TBA	TBA	November 21, 2017	409,000
2	"Tumbleweed Tiny Homes"	Colorado Springs, CO	$3,000,000 LOAN (to be paid back) for 75% of the equity	Deal	November 28, 2017	559,000
3	"Detroit Denim"	Detroit, MI	$300,000 for 51% of the business	Deal	December 5, 2017	517,000
4	"Monica Potter Home"	Garrettsville, OH	$100,000 for 50% of the business. At the end of the episode Lemonis and Monica Potter decided to cancel the deal, as Potter was uncomfortable with not being in charge of the business.	No Deal	December 12, 2017	404,000
5	"Mr. Cory's Cookies"	New York City, NY	$100,000 for 40% of the business	Deal	December 19, 2017	451,000
Special	"The Profit in Puerto Rico: An American Crisis"	Puerto Rico	TBA	TBA	December 26, 2017	507,000
Special	"The Profit in Marijuana Country"	Humboldt County, CA	TBA	TBA	January 2, 2018	492,000
Marcus visits the Emerald Triangle to show how business operate there.
6	"Rayjus / Bentley's Pet Stuff"	Morris, IL	No offer made	No Deal	January 9, 2018	547,000
Marcus initially visits Rayjus, a company that manufacturers custom T-shirts for fishermen. He was unwilling to make an offer, citing his concerns with a second job held by one of the owners. The majority of the episode re-visits one of his previous investments, Bentley's Corner Barkery (now Bentley's Pet Stuff), that is going through growing pains as it has expanded to over 80 stores.
7	"JD Custom Designs"	Fullerton, CA	$300,000 for 50% of the business	Deal	January 16, 2018	447,000
8	"Faded Royalty"	New York City, NY	$150,000 for 50% of the business	Deal	January 23, 2018	536,000
9	"Southern Culture"	Atlanta, GA	$75,000 for 34% of the business	Deal	February 6, 2018	486,000
10	"Fighting for Farrell's"	Southern CA	TBA	TBA	February 27, 2018	466,000
11	"Tankfarm & Co."	Huntington Beach, CA	$500,000 in equity and $500,000 in line of credit for 33.33% of the business	Deal	June 12, 2018	365,000
12	"The Casery"	Los Angeles, CA	$700,000 for 31% of the business and 51% of the voting shares, buyout a $350,000 loan to the company	No Deal	June 19, 2018	439,000
13	"Ellison Eyewear"	Chicago, IL	$350,000 for 50% of the business	Deal	June 26, 2018	396,000
14	"Diaper Dude"	Los Angeles, CA	$200,000 for 60% of the business	Deal	July 3, 2018	N/A
15	"Simply Slices"	Crestwood, IL	$200,000 for 50% of the franchise business. The owner agreed to the deal initially, but ended the deal later on as he and Lemonis had disagreements about running the business.	No Deal	July 10, 2018	N/A
16	"Hangout Lightning"	Chicago, IL	$200,000 for 25% of the business with 5% of that going to a shared bonus program for employees.	Deal	July 17, 2018	N/A
17	"Montiel"	Los Angeles, CA	$750,000 for 45% of the business.	No Deal	July 24, 2018	N/A
18	"Baby Bump"	New Orleans, LA	$100,000 for 50% of the business.	Deal	July 31, 2018	N/A

=== Season 6 (2018–19) ===
No.	Title	Location	Original offer	Outcome	Original release date
1	"NYC Bagel Deli"	Chicago, IL	$250,000 for 25% of the business	Deal	December 4, 2018
2	"Queork"	New Orleans, LA	$120,000 for 1/3 of the business	Deal	December 11, 2018
3	"Santas Toys"	Santa Claus, IN	$75,000 for 50% of the online business	Deal	December 18, 2018
4	"Ben's Garden"	New York City, NY	$400,000 for 40% of the business	Deal	January 15, 2019
5	"After the Casery (Everkin)"	Los Angeles, CA	$2,000,000 for 49% of the new company	Deal	January 23, 2019
6	"Jackie's Cookie Connection"	Los Angeles, CA	No offer made	No Deal	February 12, 2019
7	"Lyles BBQ"	Lexington, KY	$100,000 for 65% of Mall location and new business opportunities, plus son of owners given job with Lemonis' company	Deal	February 19, 2019
8	"Snowdays"	New York City, NY	$300,000 for 50% of the business	Deal	February 26, 2019
9	"FEAT Socks"	Los Angeles, CA	No offer made. Lemonis wanted to test out the owners’ marketing skills with a concept called ‘Marcus Lemonis Community’, but were eventually dismissed.	No Deal	March 5, 2019
10	"SmithFly"	Troy, OH	$1,000,000 for 50% of the business	Deal	March 12, 2019
11	"Handi Products"	Libertyville, IL	$1,000,000 for 15% of the business and an option to invest another $1,000,000 for 15% within 4 years	Deal	March 19, 2019

=== Season 7 (2019–20) ===
No.	Title	Location	Original offer	Outcome	Original release date
1	"Dante's"	Rockaway, NJ	$30,000 loan to be repaid whenever the owner of the business felt comfortable.	Deal	November 5, 2019
2	"CocoTaps"	Las Vegas, NV	$100,000 down payment for exclusive taps distribution license in Florida, contingent on utility patent being issued. Utility patent was denied 4 times and Vinny hid it from Marcus.	No Deal	November 12, 2019
3	"Skinny Latina"	Daytona Beach, FL	$200,000 for 40% of the business in partnership with another investor.	Deal	November 19, 2019
4	"Polar Bear Coolers"	Atlanta, GA	$540,000 revolving line of credit (5% interest) for 25% equity.	Deal	November 26, 2019
5	"Macaron Queen"	Atlanta, GA	Five tier investment, each tier is $100,000 for 10% of the business.	Deal	December 3, 2019
6	"Hatbox & Ramp"	Austin, TX & Park City, UT	No offer for Hatbox, $1,250,000 for 33% of Ramp	No Deal	December 10, 2019
7	"Las Vegas Mini Gran Prix"	Las Vegas, NV	Funding for real estate purchase	No Deal	December 17, 2019
8	"First Look: Mississippi River Cleanup"	Grafton, IL	TBA	TBA	January 7, 2020
9	"Floodtown"	TBA	TBA	TBA	January 21, 2020
10	"B Sweet"	Los Angeles, CA	$250,000 for 50% of the beverage part of the business.	Deal	January 28, 2020
11	"Cover your Hide"	Los Angeles, CA	$115,000 for 50% of the business under the condition to rename the company (renamed from Lumillamingus to Lumilla)	Deal	February 11, 2020
12	"Who's the Big Cheese"	New York City, NY	$125,000 for one third of the Ideal Cheese Shop company as a preferred investor. The deal was later restructured and Lemonis investment became a loan.	Deal	February 18, 2020
13	"A Crash Course in Van Life"	Los Angeles, CA	No Offer	No Deal	February 25, 2020

=== Season 8 (2021) ===
No.	Title	Location	Original offer	Outcome	Original release date
1	"Mo Honey, Mo Problems"	Salt Lake City, UT	$1,050,000 ($650,000 cash, $400,000 letter of credit to vendor) for 25% of the business	Deal	August 10, 2021
2	"Any Way You Slice It"	Santa Monica, CA	$20,000 loan that the owner agreed to pay back $30,000	Deal	August 17, 2021
3	"Checks and Balances"	Los Angeles, CA	$200,000 for 20% of the business	Deal	August 24, 2021
4	"Sweet Dreams Are Made of This"	Salt Lake City, UT	$50,000 for 10% of the business	Deal	August 31, 2021
5	"Who's the Boss?"	Petaluma, CA	$300,000 for 25% of the business	No Deal	September 7, 2021
6	"A New Leash of Life"	Draper, UT	$500,000 for 50% of the business	Deal	September 14, 2021
7	"Claws and Effect"	Brooklyn, NY	$100,000 for 10% of the business	Deal	September 21, 2021
8	"Raise the Roof"	Cedar City, UT	$1,000,000 for 30% of the business	Deal	September 28, 2021

== Broadcast ==
In Australia, the series airs on A&E.

In Netherlands, the series airs on RTL Z.

In Brazil, the series airs on History Channel and on Band.

In Portugal, the series airs on SIC Radical.

In Romania and later in Hungary, the series airs on Digi Life.

In New Zealand, the series airs on Bravo.

== Controversies ==
Will Yakowicz of Inc. described the show as embodying "the American faith in second chances and reinvention" in a 2018 article discussing the aftermaths of Lemonis's investments. Yakowicz, however, argued that the most successful businesses had already been in a healthy financial condition. Mr. Green Tea (from season one), for example, made $1.2 million in revenue the year before Lemonis invested in it. Other businessowners interviewed by Yakowicz alleged that Lemonis acted "more like a callous private equity investor than a small-business savior" and accused him of exploiting them for entertainment purposes. Inc. obtained a copy of the show's contract, which included the use of hidden cameras and warnings that the production company may "portray [a] company" that appears on the show "in a false light."

Multiple businessowners also filed lawsuits against Lemonis and the production company. These included Michael and Kathleen Ference, the owners of Big Fat Greek Gyro from season two. The Ferences alleged Lemonis never paid them the promised $350,000 in exchange for 55% of the business. During the episode, the restaurant was renamed to The Simple Greek. The Simple Greek, however, operated as a separate company controlled by Lemonis with no involvement from the Ferences. In a statement to Courthouse News Service, Lemonis described The Simple Greek as "a brand new concept that I created" and added that "I don't just create a concept and then just hand it over to people for doing nothing."

Nicholas Goureau and Stephanie Menkin, the owners of Courage.B (also from season two), filed a separate lawsuit against Lemonis. The pair alleged that Lemonis defrauded them and saddled their company with debt. Courage.B was folded into another company controlled exclusively by Lemonis. Over fifty businesses later joined Goureau and Menkin's lawsuit. Lemonis described the suit as "a grand shake down from people who are not entitled to anything."

Dean and Keith Layden, the owners of Precise Graphix (featured in episode 7 of season 3) sued Lemonis, Camping World, and the production company with a fraud claim after their company went into bankruptcy. The business sued for $30 million. In July 2023, an arbitrator found for the defendants. The arbitrator found the claims baseless, and awarded over $7 million in costs to the defendant.

Fans of the show also purportedly harassed businessowners who did not do a deal with Lemonis on social media. This harassment led to death threats in some instances.

== See also ==
- Bar Rescue
- Shark Tank
- Kitchen Nightmares
- Nathan for You
- Secret Millionaire
- The Partner (TV series)
