= Camping World =

Camping vehicle and equipment manufacturer

Camping World Holdings
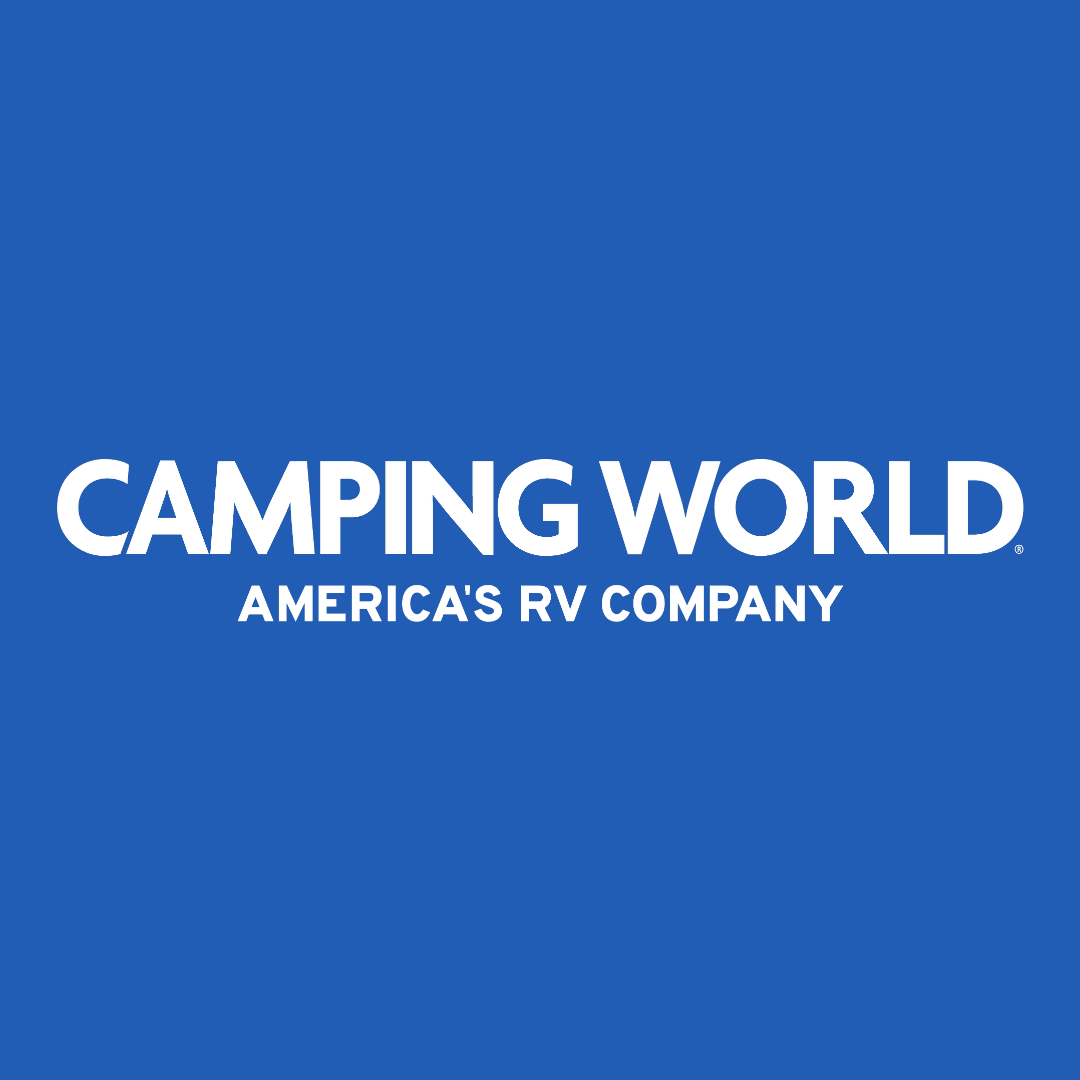
- Type: Public
- Traded as: NYSE: CWH (Class A); Russell 2000 Component
- Industry: Recreational Vehicle; Retail; Vehicle Insurance
- Founded: 1966; 60 years ago
- Founder: David Garvin
- Headquarters: Lincolnshire, Illinois
- Number of locations: 206 (Dec 2024)
- Key people: Matthew Wagner, CEO; Brent Moody, Chairman; Tom Kirn, CFO
- Products: Recreational Vehicles, RV Parts and Accessories, Camping and Outdoor Supplies
- Revenue: ▲US$6.099 billion (2024)
- Operating income: ▼US$148.570 million (2024)
- Net income: ▼US$52.929 million (2024)
- Total assets: ▲US$4.863 billion (2024)
- Total equity: ▼US$484.914 million (2024)
- Number of employees: 13,060 (2024)
- Subsidiaries: Good Sam Enterprises Gander Outdoors
- Website: rv.campingworld.com www.campingworld.com

Camping World Holdings, Inc. is an American corporation specializing in selling recreational vehicles (RVs), recreational vehicle parts, and recreational vehicle service. They also sell supplies for camping. The company has its headquarters in Lincolnshire, Illinois. In October 2016 it became a publicly traded company when it raised $251 million in an IPO. Camping World has 202 locations. In addition to its RV dealerships and accessories stores, the company sells goods through phone order and online. It claims to be the world's largest supplier of RV parts and supplies.

The company is heavily involved in sponsorship of sports entities, such as serving as the title sponsor of Camping World Stadium and the Camping World Kickoff, which is played in the same stadium. From 2023 to 2025 the company held the title sponsor of the PBR Team Series. It was previously the presenting sponsor of Major League Baseball's League Championship Series, NASCAR's Truck Series, and the National Hot Rod Association's Drag Racing Series.

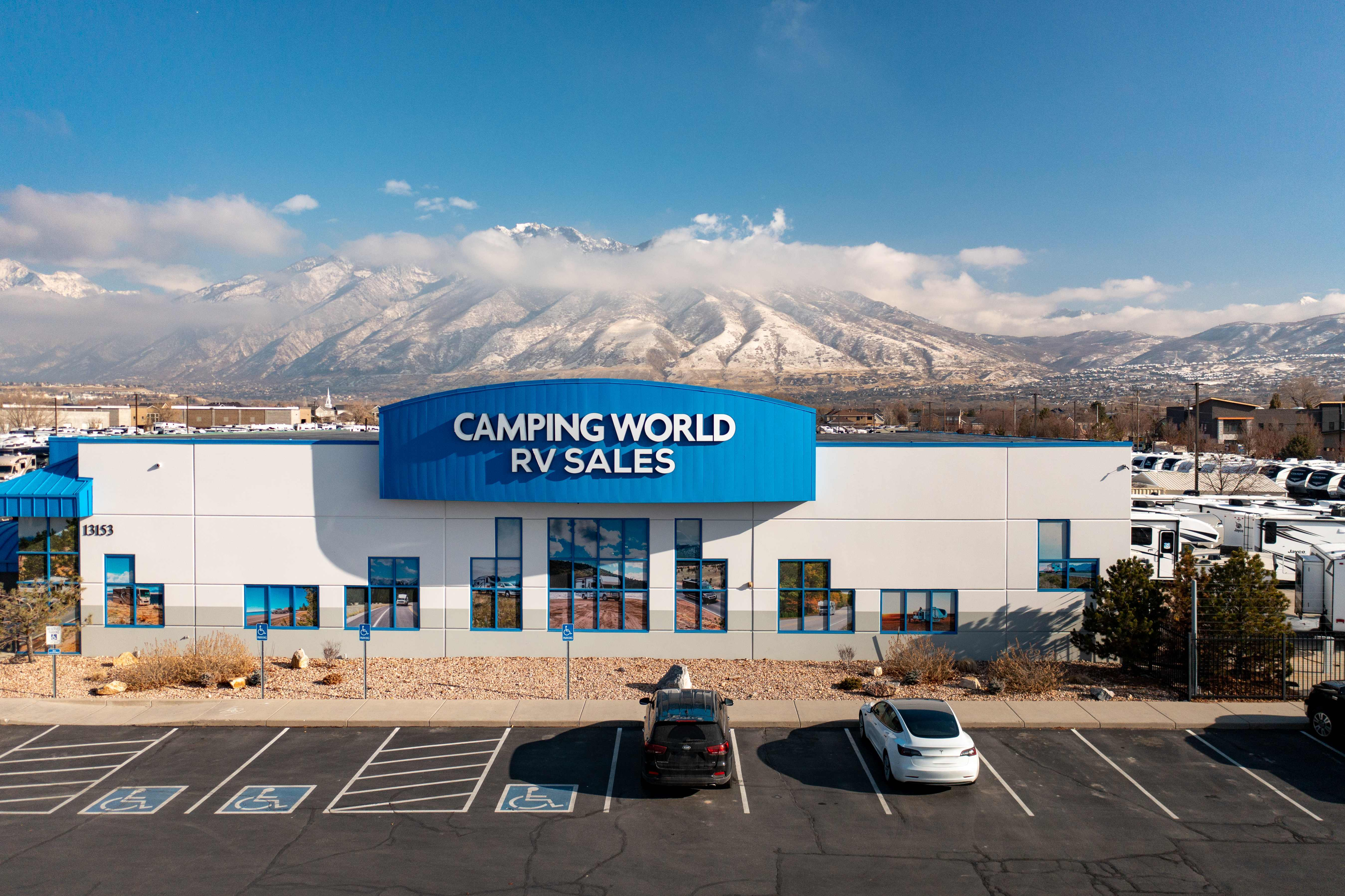
Camping World location in Draper, UT

== History ==
Camping World began in 1966 with a small store in Beech Bend Park, an amusement park outside of Bowling Green, Kentucky, which billed its campground as the world's largest. Campers at the park were requesting a store where they could buy supplies, so David Garvin—son of the park's owner—took out a loan and opened the store. Garvin amassed a large customer list as the years went by, which proved to be sagacious later when he added a mail-order division to the company. That division thrived, fueling the company's growth for years to come.

In 1997, Garvin sold the company to Affinity Group (now known as Good Sam Enterprises), of Ventura, California.

In 2005, Garvin announced plans for a huge development near Franklin, Kentucky called "Garvin's". The development, described by Garvin as "a combination of Disney World, Camping World and Bass Pro Shops", will feature a large Camping World store with RV 250 service bays; a five-story, 650,000 square foot (60,000 m^{2}) permanent RV trade show and exhibition area; a "free-range" campground with dry-camping sites; camping museum; and much more. Due to the recession, however, the venture never got off the ground and much of the land proposed for development was sold at auction in October 2011.

In early October 2016 Camping World raised $251 million in an initial public offering. The 11.4 million shares sold for $22 each. Marcus Lemonis co-owns the company with private equity firm Crestview Partners and plans to retain "substantial control" through his ownership of ML Acquisition and ML R.V. Group.

On December 8, 2025, it was announced that current President Matthew Wagner would be succeeding Marcus Lemonis as CEO of Camping World starting January 1, 2026, and Lemonis will serve as Special Advisor to the company after he retires from his CEO position.

== Operations ==
Under the Freedom Roads brand, the company sold RVs through a network of about three dozen independent dealers. In 2007, the company opened the Camping World RV Sales dealership; formerly known as Stout's RV. It is located on Interstate 65 south of Indianapolis, Indiana. Since then, the chain of dealerships has expanded to more than 200 locations across 44 US states.

The company also operates RVs.com.

In 2017, the company expanded into hunting and fishing gear by acquisition of Gander Mountain, which includes the Gander Outdoors, Gander RV, and Overton's brands. The company also acquired the outdoor gear retailer The House in 2017.

In December 2020, Lemonis announced a partnership with electric vehicle manufacturer Lordstown Motors. The deal stated that Camping World act as the service and maintenance provider for the Lordstown Endurance pickup truck, as well as potentially marketing and selling the truck at their Camping World centers. As of June 2021, the two companies announced the deal was off.

The company launched a brand-specific dealership format in 2023 aimed at showcasing a specific brand's products in several markets.

In late 2026, the company introduced ClearPrice, a pricing policy in which advertised RV prices include freight, preparation and documentation fees, with government fees added separately.

== Sports sponsorship ==
Camping World has major sponsorship involvement in sports, particularly college football and auto racing. In a 2020 interview with Autoweek, Lemonis emphasized the importance of a "conversion rate of familiarity" for sports fans—particularly those from racing series—into potential Camping World customers.

Since 2016, the company has held the naming rights to Camping World Stadium in Orlando, Florida, and also sponsors the stadium's Camping World Kickoff college football game. The stadium's bowl game was known as the Camping World Bowl from 2017 to 2019.

In 2017, the company became the inaugural title sponsor of Major League Baseball's League Championship Series. This sponsorship lasted through 2022.

In 2023, the company became the inaugural title sponsor of the Professional Bull Riders' Team Series. This sponsorship lasted through 2025.

=== Auto racing ===
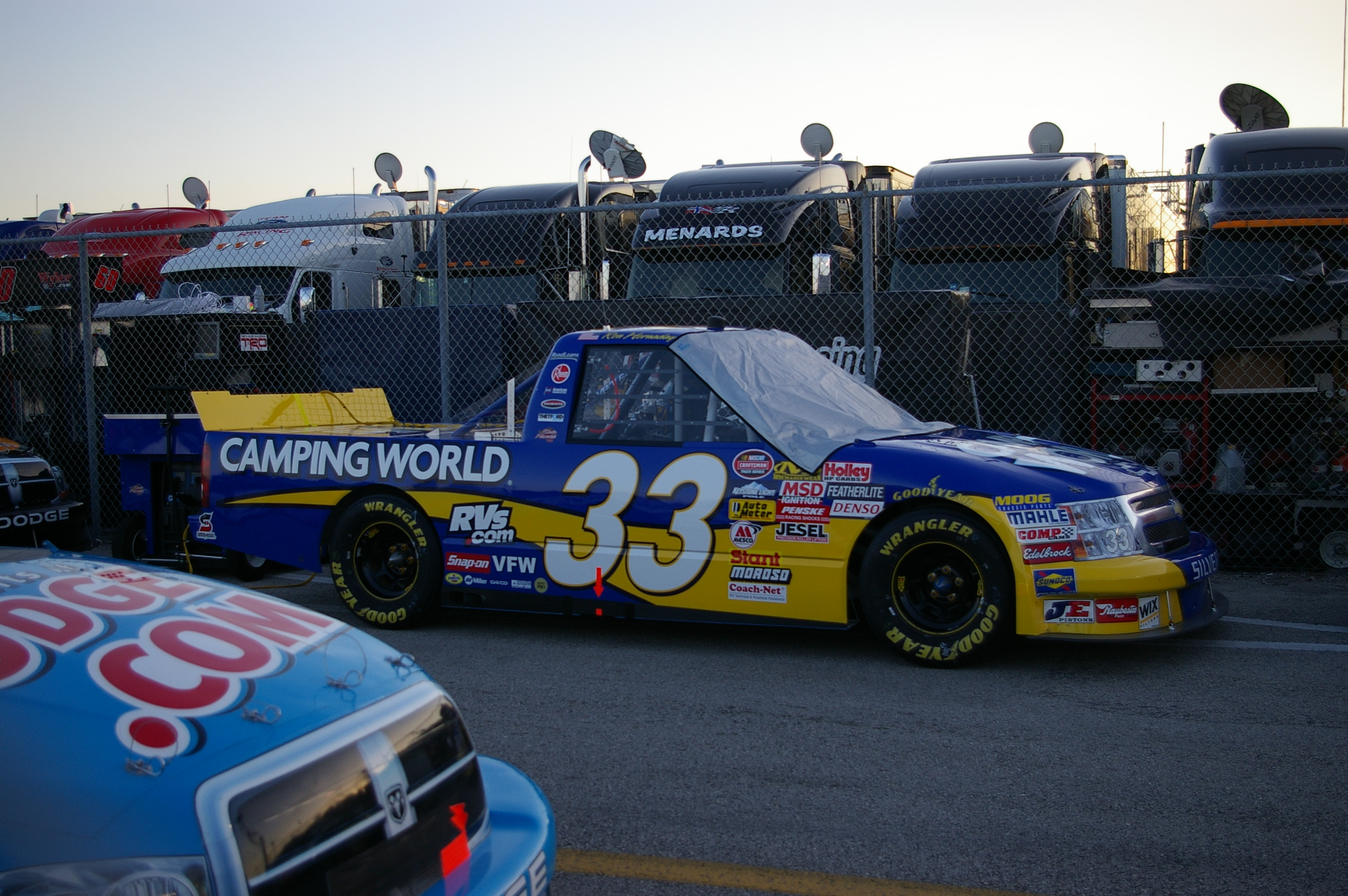
The Camping World-sponsored NASCAR Truck of Ron Hornaday Jr.

Camping World's involvement in racing began in 2006 as a sponsor of NASCAR Busch Series driver John Andretti. The following year, Andretti would also race with Camping World sponsorship in the NASCAR Cup Series and Indianapolis 500. Other Camping World promotions during the 2007 season included sponsoring races like the IndyCar Series' Grand Prix at The Glen and forming partnerships with NASCAR team Kevin Harvick Incorporated. Camping World would also sponsor various races and teams in both series over the years, such as Cup driver David Ragan and IndyCar's Scott Dixon in 2017.

In 2008, Camping World assumed title sponsorship of the NASCAR Busch East Series and NASCAR Autozone West Series, dubbing them the Camping World Series East and West. Both series names lasted until 2010 when K&N Engineering became the new sponsor.

Camping World became the title sponsor of NASCAR's Truck Series in 2009, replacing 13-year sponsor Sears through its Craftsman brand (since sold to Stanley Black & Decker). The sponsorship started in 2009 and lasted until 2022.

On May 8, 2018, NASCAR announced an extension of Camping World Holdings' involvement in NASCAR, including a rebrand of the Truck Series to the Gander Outdoors Truck Series, a move made as Camping World's 2017 acquisition of the brand has allowed them to brand the series with an outdoors store. After two years with Gander Outdoors branding (the second of which was as the Gander RV & Outdoors Truck Series), the series reverted to the Camping World Truck Series name in 2021.

In October 2020, Camping World acquired the naming rights to the National Hot Rod Association's pro series, branding it the NHRA Camping World Drag Racing Series. The sponsorship had been spurred by a tweet from Lemonis in September expressing his interest in supporting the NHRA after it had lost its title sponsorship with Coca-Cola.

In February 2021, in response to the previous season's Truck Series champion Sheldon Creed's truck running nearly unsponsored during the first two races of the 2021 NASCAR Camping World Truck Series, Lemonis made a "challenge" to all unsponsored teams for the 2021 Bucked Up 200 at Las Vegas Motor Speedway. His deal was to give teams $15,000 just to have the truck wrapped in Camping World colors and logos, $25,000 if the truck comes in the top 10, $35,000 for a top 5, and $50,000 if the truck wins. Numerous drivers and owners took Lemonis up on his offer, including Creed. Lemonis' sponsorship campaign continued in later races, with his other companies like Good Sam also being involved, and included supporting NASCAR Xfinity Series teams.

Ahead of its inaugural season in June 2021, Camping World became the title sponsor for the Superstar Racing Experience, naming it the Camping World SRX Series. The collaboration was led by Lemonis' donation to the Plating Change charity.

== See also ==
- Good Sam Enterprises
- Good Sam Club
- Gander Mountain
- Stephen Adams
