= Marcus Lemonis =

American businessman (born 1973)

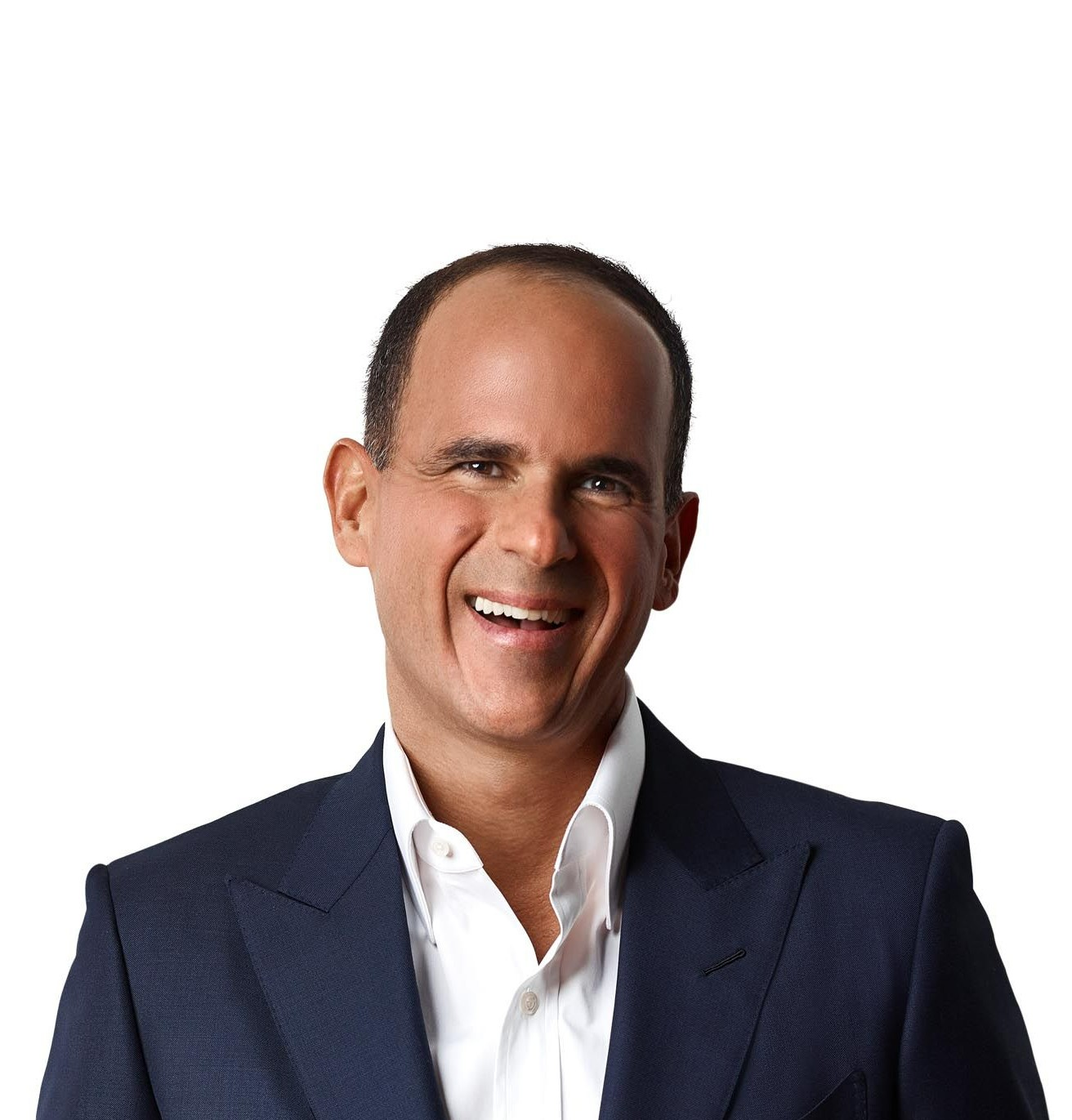
- Lemonis in 2019
- Born: November 16, 1973 (age 52); Beirut, Lebanon
- Education: Marquette University
- Occupations: Businessman, television personality, philanthropist
- Television: The Profit (on CNBC); Let's Make a Deal; The Fixer
- Spouse: Roberta "Bobbi" Raffel (m. 2018)
- Website: marcuslemonis.com

Marcus Anthony Lemonis (born November 16, 1973) is an American businessman, TV personality, and entrepreneur. He is the co-owner of Camping World and the executive chairman of Bed Bath & Beyond. Additionally, he is the star of The Profit, a CNBC reality show about saving small businesses and co-owner of Marcus/Glass Entertainment, which owns Let's Make a Deal. He stars in the Fox reality series, The Fixer.

== Early life and education ==
Lemonis was born in Beirut, Lebanon, during the Lebanese Civil War, to Abdelmasih, and Nadia, who was from Baniyas, Syria.

He was given the name Ricardo but was abandoned at an orphanage four days after his birth. He was adopted during his infancy on July 29, 1974, by Leo and Sophia Lemonis, a couple living in Miami, Florida. His adoptive father was Greek, and his adoptive mother was Lebanese.

Throughout his upbringing, Lemonis was exposed to the automotive industry, with his great uncle (Anthony Abraham) owning two of the largest Chevrolet dealerships in the United States. Family friend Lee Iacocca mentored Lemonis and invested millions to help him start a recreational vehicle business.

Lemonis graduated in 1991 from Christopher Columbus High School in Miami-Dade County, Florida. In 1995, he earned a bachelor's degree in political science, with a minor in criminology, from Marquette University in Milwaukee, Wisconsin. He unsuccessfully ran as a Democrat for a seat in the Florida House of Representatives shortly after his graduation, whereupon he refocused his career on the automotive industry.

== Career ==
=== 1996 Florida House campaign ===
Lemonis, appearing on the ballot as Marc Anthony Lemonis, lost to two-term Republican incumbent Bruno Barreiro, 42.44 percent to 57.56 percent. The Miami Herald called Lemonis, a Democrat, a "political neophyte" but endorsed him because "he exudes energy and ideas."

=== Automotive career ===
Lemonis worked for his great uncle's car dealership in South Florida, Anthony Abraham Chevrolet. That dealership was acquired by AutoNation in 1997, and Lemonis subsequently held several sales and managerial roles under the new ownership. A family friend, Lee Iacocca approached Lemonis and told him he wanted to "Create the largest RV chain" as the RV business model in the United States was "fractured". Iacocca helped Lemonis start and acquire Holiday RV Superstores. From June 2001 to February 2003 he was CEO of Holiday RV Superstores Inc. Following that, he co-founded a company called FreedomRoads and began acquiring RV dealerships. In 2006, the company merged with Camping World with Lemonis as CEO, and then, in 2011, merged with Good Sam Enterprises, with Lemonis again at the helm.

=== Camping World ===
As the CEO of Camping World, Lemonis sponsored NASCAR driver John Andretti in 2004. In 2007, Lemonis and Camping World announced they were taking over sponsorship of the NASCAR East Series from Busch Beer for the 2008–2009 seasons, rebranding it the NASCAR Camping World Series. Later that same year, they also announced sponsorship of the then Craftsman Truck Series, rebranding it the NASCAR Camping World Truck Series, making the company one of the sport's top three sponsors. They renewed their sponsorship in 2014.

Crain's Chicago Business featured him in their 2005 edition of "40 under 40"; and in 2008, Ernst & Young named him "Entrepreneur of the Year".

In October 2016, Camping World went public on the New York Stock Exchange (NYSE: CWH) at $22 a share, giving the company a market value of approximately $2 billion. As of October 31, 2024, Camping World was trading at $20.06 per share.

In April 2017, Camping World announced the acquisition of the assets of Gander Mountain, a camping, fishing and hunting gear retailer.

In July 2017, Camping World announced the acquisition of The House Boardshop, an online retailer specializing in bikes, sailboards, skateboards, wakeboards, snowboards and outdoor gear.

In November 2021, Pamela Perry sued Camping World, Inc. and Lemonis for Breach of Contract, after defendants made a "promise to the citizens of Nashville for information identifying" the bomber in the 2020 Nashville Christmas bombing but refused to pay. A spokesman for Lemonis replied that the reward offered was for information leading to the "capture and conviction" of the person responsible for (and killed in) the bombing. The lawsuit was dismissed.

On December 8, 2025, it was announced that Marcus Lemonis would step down from his position of CEO for Camping World starting January 1, 2026. After retiring as CEO, he will be a senior advisor to the company.

=== Bed Bath & Beyond ===
In August 2025, in his new capacity as executive chairman of Bed Bath & Beyond, Lemonis said the company would not open stores in California. The company had previously gone bankrupt and closed all stores in 2023. In a statement, he wrote, "This decision isn't about politics – it's about reality. California has created one of the most overregulated, expensive, and risky environments for businesses in America. It's a system that makes it harder to employ people, harder to keep doors open, and harder to deliver value to customers." California Governor Gavin Newsom's Press Office responded on X, saying: "After their bankruptcy and closure of every store, like most Americans, we thought Bed, Bath & Beyond no longer existed. We wish them well in their efforts to become relevant again as they try to open a 2nd store." The company backtracked on this with the opening of brick-and-mortar store locations in the state of California in 2026.

It was announced on January 5, 2026, that Lemonis would become the new CEO of Bed Bath & Beyond, effective January 8, 2026. In the announcement, Lemonis outlined a "three-pillar strategy" for the company which includes offering services, insurance, financing tool options, and "mortgage related solutions."

=== Television ===
Lemonis appeared on two episodes of NBC's Celebrity Apprentice. In 2012, Lemonis appeared on an episode of ABC's Secret Millionaire, returning to his hometown of Miami to help local charities.

In 2013, Lemonis starred in the CNBC reality show The Profit, which follows his efforts to turn around struggling small businesses. In the show, Lemonis invests his own money for part ownership in the businesses to make them profitable.

In 2017, Lemonis starred in, and co-produced, the CNBC program The Partner, in which he searches for a business manager to assist him with running the businesses that he invests in on The Profit.

In August 2021, NBCUniversal, Machete, and Lemonis were accused of harmful business practices by over 50 small businesses that appeared on The Profit.

In 2021, it was announced that Lemonis and Nancy Glass had acquired the rights of the game show Let's Make a Deal.

In 2022, it was announced that Lemonis would star in a new HGTV show called The Renovator. The show debuted on October 11, 2022, and two episodes aired before it entered a hiatus.

On July 18, 2025, Lemonis' new show, The Fixer, aired on Fox where he works to turn around struggling businesses.

== Philanthropy ==
Lemonis founded the Lemon-AID Foundation in 2020. The foundation supports women and minority entrepreneurs as well as small businesses. Lemonis also founded the Business Learning Center, a virtual platform for resources and business tools for those struggling as a result of the COVID-19 pandemic.

Lemonis's foundation launched "Plating Change," an initiative to fight food insecurity in partnership with Grubhub and World Central Kitchen.

In 2020, Lemonis challenged Dave Portnoy of Barstool Sports to donate $500,000 to small businesses during the COVID-19 pandemic. Not only did Portnoy donate the $500,000, but he started the Barstool Fund, which raised over $39 million for small businesses.

Lemonis has donated to his alma maters, including Christopher Columbus High School and $15Μ to Marquette University. He has supported the Joffrey Ballet Bridge Program in the Chicago public school system. In 2016–17, Lemonis launched a matching campaign to support the sports program at University of Miami. After the 2020 Nashville bombing on Christmas Day, Lemonis established a fund to support the business owners affected by the event. In 2021 Lemonis gave $3.1 million to the staff of Christopher Columbus High School ($18,000 to each staff member).

== Personal life ==
Lemonis married Roberta "Bobbi" Raffel in 2018 and lives in Lake Forest, Illinois.
