= Truck camper =

Type of vehicle

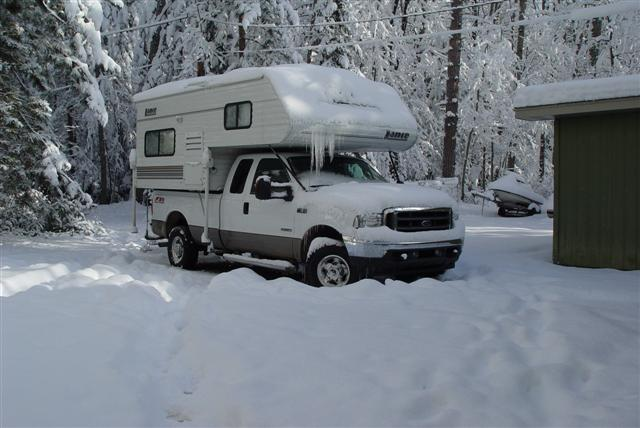
A truck camper

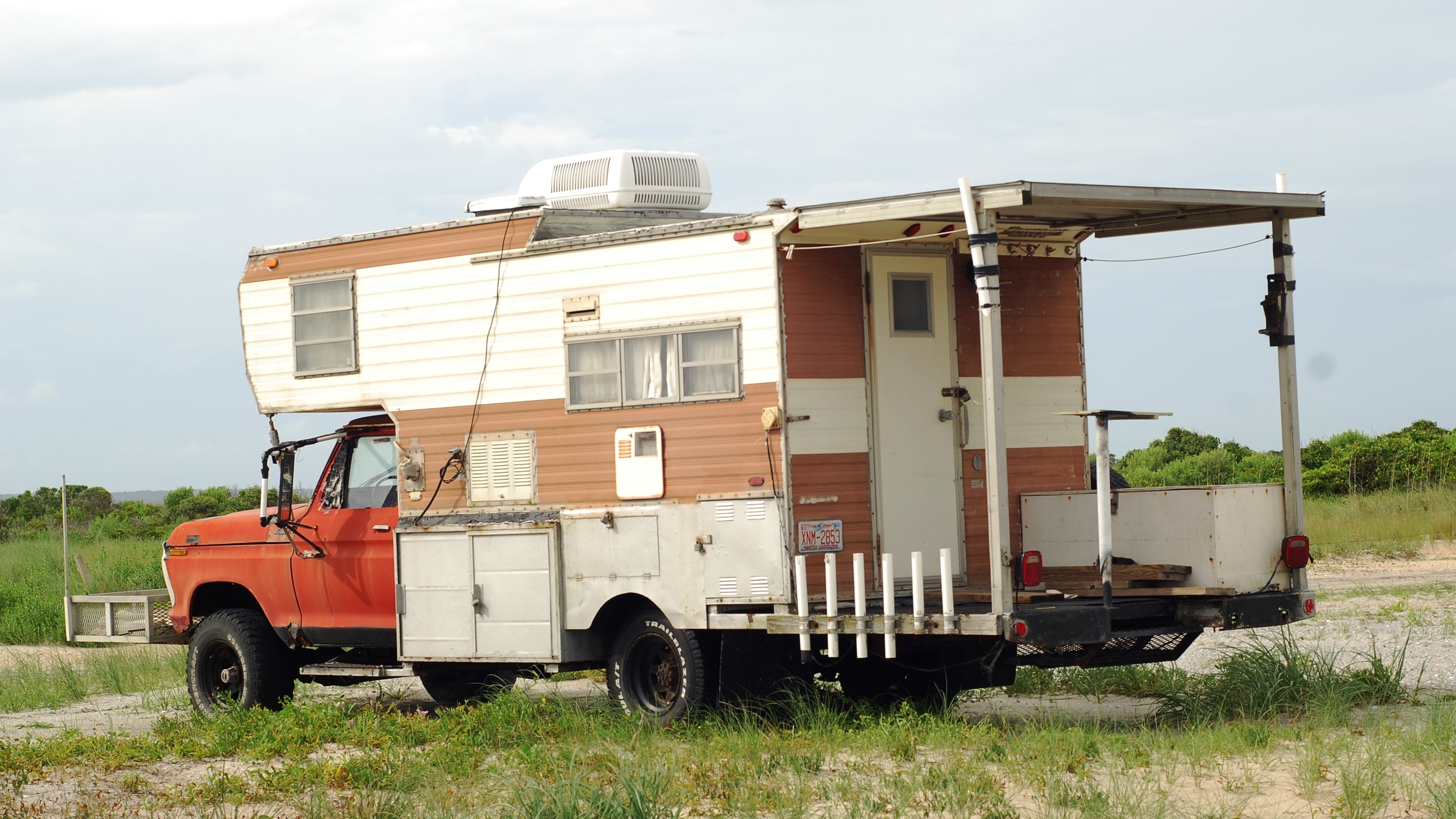
A truck camper customized for beach driving and offshore fishing

In North America, the term truck camper (TC) is generally used to refer to any recreational vehicle (RV) that may be carried in the bed of a pickup truck. In North America, this RV type is sometimes known as a slide-in or cab-over.

In English-speaking Europe the term demountable or dismountable is more frequently used, and in Australia, the term slide-on or jack-off is used to describe RVs of this type. In the vast majority of states in the United States truck campers are not registered, titled and are thus not considered a recreational vehicle but rather cargo or a truck accessory.

Long term/full-time residence is sometimes referred to as "Trucklife" in contrast with the more popular "vanlife" movement.

== History ==
The earliest truck campers date to the mid-1950s and appeared almost at the same time. They were the Cree Truck Coach built in Saline, Michigan, by Howard Cree and the Sport King built by Walter King's company in Torrance, California. King built the first cab-over camper. The first Cree models were displayed at a sports-and-travel show at Navy Pier in Chicago in 1945.

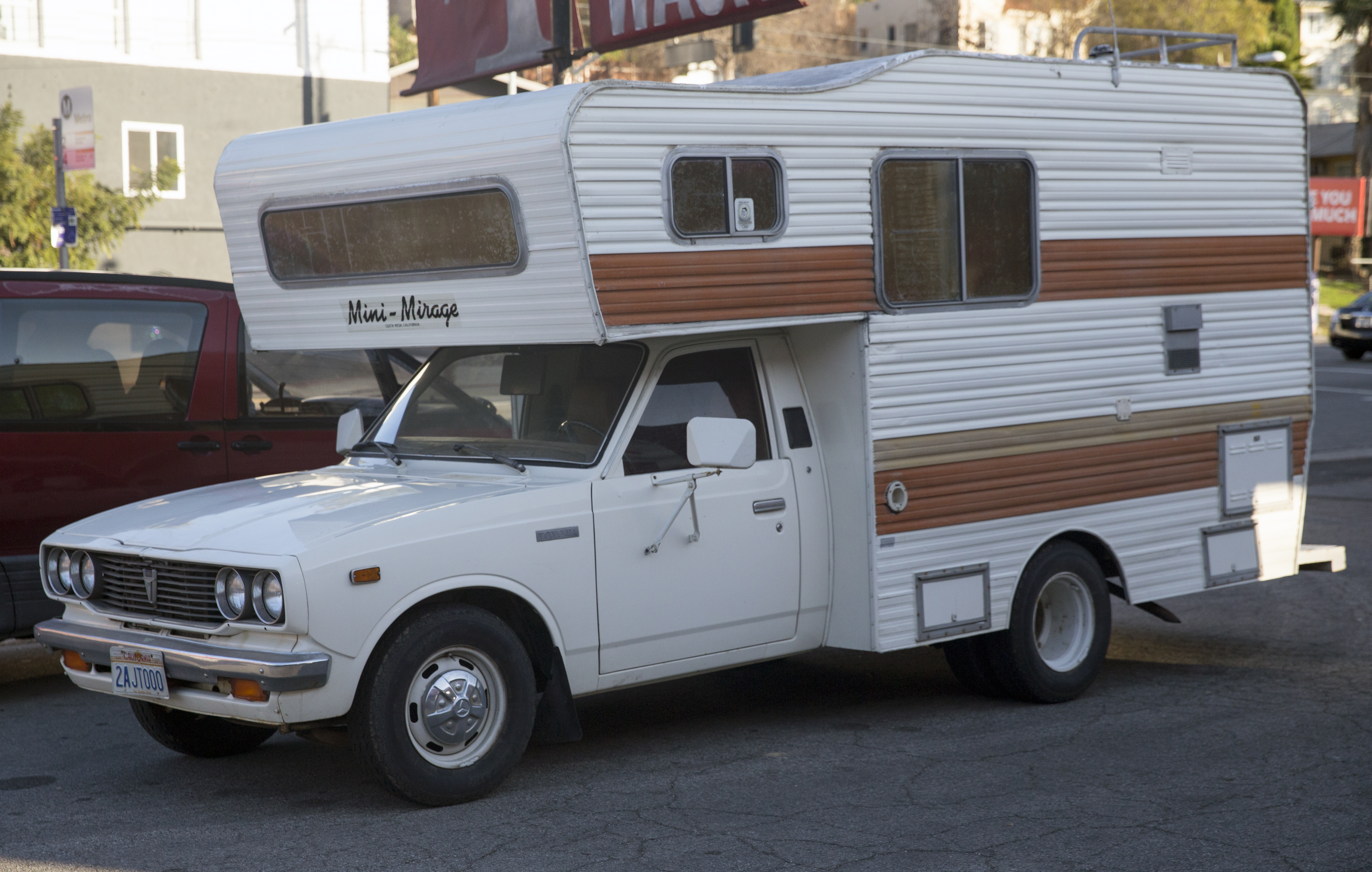
1978 Toyota Hilux compact truck with a Mini-Mirage camper. This would be classed as a RV, because the camper section is permanently attached to the frame of the truck.

In the 1970s and 1980s, campers for compact trucks (mainly Toyotas and Datsuns) were popular in North America. Many were built on bare chassis with twin rear wheels. After a number of manufacturers sold units that were heavier than the chassis could take, the boom ended and nowadays nearly all truck campers sold in North America are mounted on full-size pickups. What is believed to be the world's largest truck camper (18 foot, 6 metre) was manufactured by Interior RV (now defunct) of Penticton, BC, Canada. It was a one-of-a-kind concept unit. It was sold in 2008 or 2009 and its current location is unknown. Interior RV was also the first company to develop a slide out for a truck camper.

The truck camper has gone through an evolution in development that places it on par with many larger and more expensive RV types in terms of amenities.

North America's largest truck camper manufacturer is Lance Camper Manufacturing Corporation of Lancaster, California, followed by Arctic Fox of La Grande, Oregon. Lance's most popular model is the Lance 1172. Truck campers continue to be most popular in the Western United States and Canada, and this is where most manufacturers are headquartered. They are slowly making inroads into the eastern part of the continent as the baby boomer generation retires, and are looking for comfort combined with freedom and versatility. The truck camper is also becoming a very popular RV type in Australia, where rugged terrain makes them a practical choice.

== Features and classification of truck campers ==
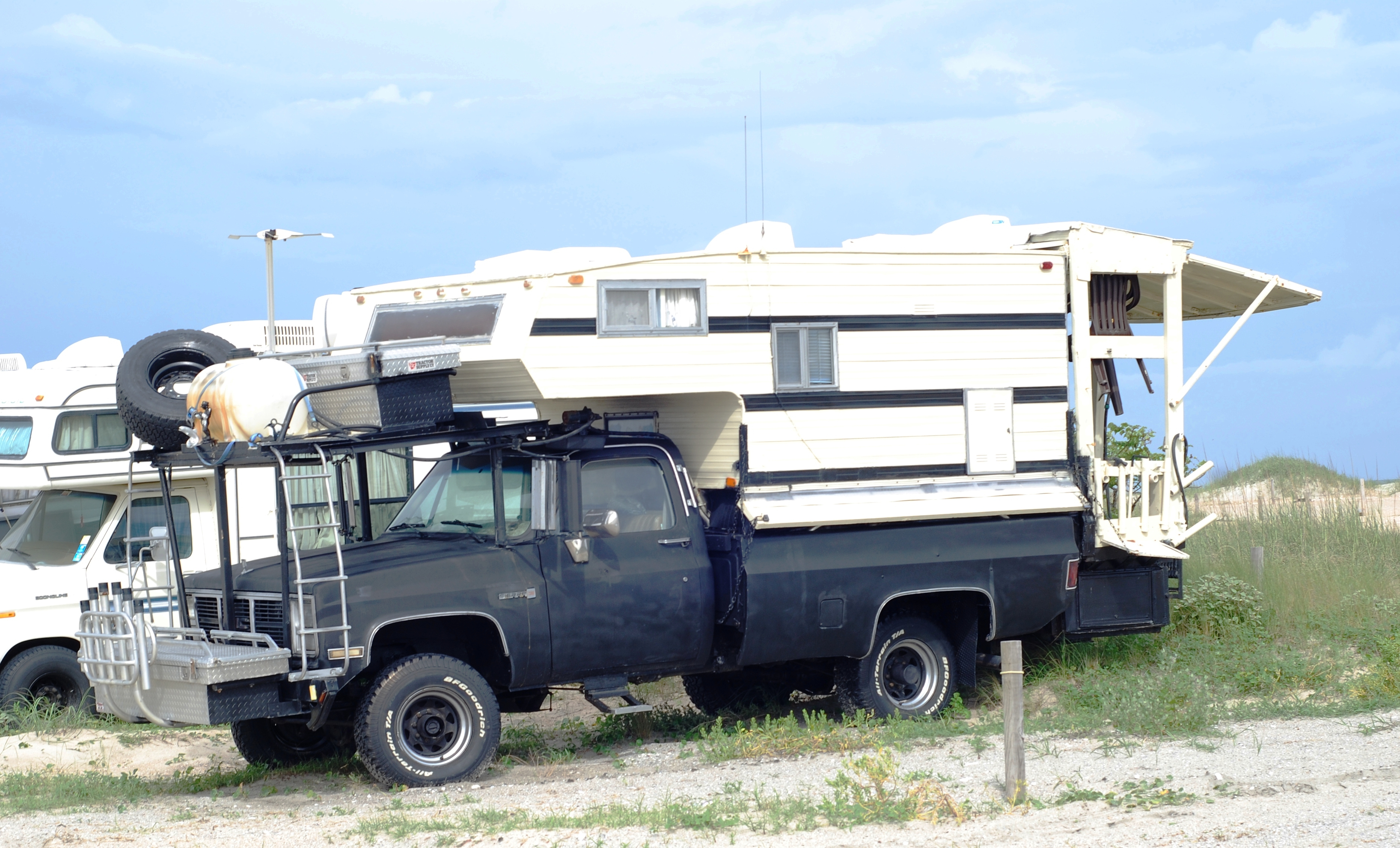
A truck camper customized for beach driving and offshore fishing

Technically speaking, any RV that can be easily dismounted from its carrying vehicle qualifies as a truck camper. In Australia it is very common to see them mounted on flatbed trucks, or even on what, in North America, would be considered a car.

The lines of definition can blur between a truck camper and a recreational vehicle (RV) with some expedition vehicles like the xpcamper or the EarthRoamer. Truck campers are temporarily mounted, while the camper part of a RV is typically not designed to be easily removed from the vehicle it is attached to.

Modern truck campers contain most of the amenities found in larger RV types, including refrigerators, stoves, furnaces, ovens, microwaves, bathrooms, showers, etc. Many modern truck campers utilize "slides", which are a movable sections of exterior wall, usually containing the dinette.

Truck campers are loaded and off-loaded to a vehicle utilizing four corner jacks which enable the camper to be raised, and the truck backed up underneath. The camper is then secured to the vehicle with chains or spring-loaded tie-downs.

Truck campers are a popular choice for horseback riders, fishermen, hunters, and other sportsmen as a boat or horse trailer may be easily towed. They facilitate camping "off-road" in relative comfort.

A good quality truck camper can cost as much as a much larger RV. All the amenities have to be put into a much smaller package, and the RV has to be able to tolerate the abuse of rough roads.

There are different classes of RVs generally labeled as truck campers:

- Clamshell: The clamshell construction is utilized by two Canadian manufacturers, Bigfoot and Northern Lite and consists of two fiberglass shells, joined horizontally, at the center.
- Hardside Filon, Wood Framed: This is a camper using wood framing (usually fir), finished in Filon, a thin fiberglass layer on a wood backing.
- Hardside Filon, Aluminum-framed: This is a camper using aluminum framing, finished in Filon, a thin fiberglass layer on a wood backing.
- Hardside aluminum: This is a camper using wood or aluminum framing, finished with aluminum siding.
- Pop-up: A low-profile truck camper designed to cut back on weight and wind resistance.

Construction techniques may utilize any of the above methods except clamshell. The roof may be raised by mechanical means to add height while camping. There are two types prevalent in the industry: soft-walled, utilizing a fabric (canvas or Weblon), or the hard-walled, solid frame unit. Examples include Four Wheel Campers (softwall), All Terrain Campers (softwall), Northstar (softwall), Hallmark (softwall), or Alaskan Camper(hardwall).

- Campers with slides: These are campers with a one or more movable wall sections. These sections known as "slides", and increase the interior living space. Some contain only the dinette, others, called "full wall" slides, may contain the dinette, the fridge and other appliances. Examples are Snow River, Arctic Fox, Lance, Okanagan, Adventurer and Host. Companies currently producing double slides are Lance, Adventurer and Host. Host produces a triple-slide model. A slide is currently only possible in campers with frame construction, not pop-ups or fiberglass clamshell types.

== Shows and rallies ==
There are several RV shows each year featuring truck campers. The major Truck Camper Show held bi-annually in the US Midwest features truck campers exclusively. This is usually combined with a national rally. It is currently suspended due to economic conditions in the industry (2008-2012).

== Clubs and manufacturer organizations ==
The North American Truck Camper Owners Association is a non-profit organization representing manufacturers & users of Truck Campers. It also runs the national show through an associated S-Corporation (North American Truck Campers of America, also NATCOA).

The Lance Owners of America (LOA) is another truck camper club representing Lance owners and also open to any other truck camper enthusiasts. There are many other clubs that are brand specific, but not truck camper specific.

== Truck camper in popular culture ==
American author John Steinbeck owned a truck camper, a Wolverine cabin on a GMC 1960 model 3/4 ton truck that he named "Rocinante" after Don Quixote's horse. He used it for a tour around the US with his French poodle Charley in 1960. Steinbeck's book Travels with Charley in Search of America (1962) is a travelogue of that trip. The camper still exists at the National Steinbeck Center in Salinas, California.

== See also ==
- Campervan
- List of truck types
- Motorhome stopover
- RV park
- Trailer park
