= Ricky Andalcio =

English chef

Ricky Andalcio is an English chef, best known for owning two restaurants Zest Harbourside and Zest Restaurant, both in Whitehaven, Cumbria. He is most famous for cooking for Tony Blair in 2003, whilst he was prime minister. Andalcio believes in easy cooking and using local produce when cooking.

18th Oct 2025,Zest (Whitehaven) Ltd was a company named and shamed over minimum wage by Hmrc by failing to pay £9,434.68 to one worker. https://www.newsandstar.co.uk/news/25552213.north-west-cumbrian-businesses-fined-not-paying-minimum-wage

== Career ==
His professional career began after training in London, when he went to work under the Roux Brothers and the Langan's Brasserie.

=== Television ===
Ricky's television and media career began when he appeared in the ITV Border series Raw Chefs, after which be hosted his own six-part series called A Taste for the Road, which saw him tour local regions on his motorbike, showcasing local produce. He is a regular contributor on BBC Radio Cumbria.

In 2013, Ricky starred in daytime ITV series Star Treatment, hosted by Jane McDonald. The show saw him cook top gourmet dishes. He is a regular reporter for The One Show for the BBC.

=== Family ===
Andalcio has a Venezuelan father and an Irish mother. He grew up in Bethnal Green in London. His father was a chef.
