= One Moment in Time =

- Cover art for North American and UK editions

Single by Whitney Houston

from the album 1988 Summer Olympics Album: One Moment in Time
- B-side: "Love Is a Contact Sport"
- Released: August 27, 1988
- Recorded: May–July 1988
- Studio: AIR Studios (London, England)
- Genre: Pop; soul
- Length: 4:44
- Label: Arista
- Songwriters: Albert Hammond; John Bettis
- Producer: Narada Michael Walden

Whitney Houston singles chronology
"Love Will Save the Day" (1988)	"One Moment in Time" (1988)	"I Know Him So Well" (1988)

Music video
- "One Moment in Time" on YouTube

"One Moment in Time" is a sentimental ballad by American singer Whitney Houston, written by Albert Hammond and John Bettis, and produced by Narada Michael Walden as a promotional song for the 1988 Summer Olympics in Seoul, South Korea. It was released by Arista Records on August 27, 1988, as the first single from the compilation album 1988 Summer Olympics Album: One Moment in Time, produced in conjunction with NBC Sports' coverage of the games.

The song was a critical and commercial success, topping the Eurochart Hot 100 and the individual European countries Germany and the United Kingdom while reaching the top ten in several other countries, including the United States where it peaked at number five on the Billboard Hot 100 and topped its Adult Contemporary singles chart. The song won Houston the Grammy Award nomination for Best Female Pop Vocal Performance in 1989.

The song was later included on the second disc of her first greatest hits Whitney: The Greatest Hits; it is also on The Ultimate Collection and on the second disc of I Will Always Love You: The Best of Whitney Houston.

It has been considered by media outlets as one of the greatest Olympic anthem songs ever recorded, with some such as Billboard citing it as the standard for all Olympics anthems to be measured by.

== Background, recording and composition ==
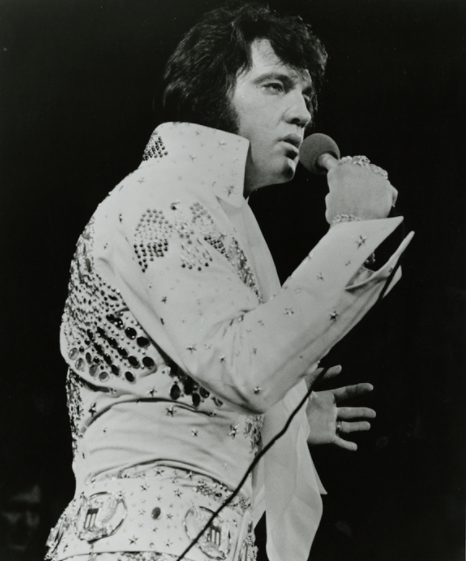
Elvis Presley inspired the melody of "One Moment in Time".

Veteran songwriters Albert Hammond and John Bettis were tasked by executives for NBC to write a song for coverage of the 1988 Summer Olympics in Seoul. Hammond explained that the melody of the song was inspired by Elvis Presley, with the composer imagining it as being sung by Presley "in lavish style" at the Olympics' opening ceremony.

Hammond later explained that after talking about composing the song over the phone that lyricist Bettis came up with the lyrics "within an hour". After Bettis gave Hammond the chorus that he took to his piano and sang it with the melody he composed for the song, which amazed Bettis.

After finishing the song, it was decided that Whitney Houston, then in the middle of a nine-date historic concert residency at London's Wembley Arena during her Moment of Truth World Tour that May, would record the song with production of the song being given to Houston collaborator Narada Michael Walden.

Walden recalled to Newsweek on arranging and producing the track, stating he took inspiration from the "high-pocket trumpets" used in the Beatles' 1967 song "Penny Lane", further explaining "I pulled forth little things I thought would push people and wake them up."

The producer was also inspired by the instrumental theme to Chariots of Fire in making the track.

Walden and Houston recorded the song at the AIR Studios complex owned by former Beatles producer George Martin with the backing of the London Symphony Orchestra. Martin, at one point, stopped by the studio and, according to Walden, was "amazed by [Houston's] vocal prowess, infusing a pop ballad with the gospel that she had been steeped in all of her life."

Hearing playback of the song that July, Arista boss Clive Davis requested Houston to record extra vocals for his satisfaction. Though Houston chagrined at this request due to taking a break from her expansive tour, she agreed to record the extra vocals.

The track is an anthem for believing in yourself against all odds as Houston asks for "One moment in time/when I'm racing with destiny/Then, in that one moment of time, I will feel eternity."

"One Moment in Time" is a pop ballad with elements of soul and gospel. According to the sheet notes provided by Warner Chappell Music, the song mostly plays in the key of C major and shifts to C♯ after the bridge. The song has a medium ballad tempo with 80 beats per minute. Houston's vocal range in the song spans from the low note of G_{3} to the high note of F_{5}.

== Release and reception ==
The song appeared on the aforementioned 1988 Summer Olympics Album: One Moment in Time compilation album from Arista Records, which (in addition to Houston) also featured artists such as The Four Tops, The Bee Gees, Eric Carmen, Taylor Dayne and film composer John Williams and was released as its first single on August 27, 1988.

=== Chart performance ===
==== North America ====
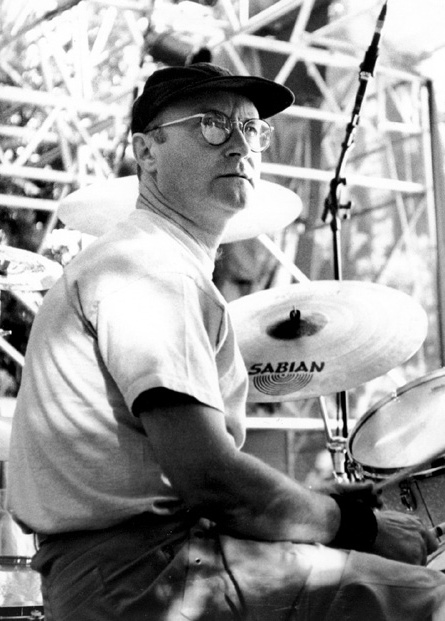
"One Moment in Time" replaced Phil Collins's "A Groovy Kind of Love" from the top spot of both the US adult contemporary chart and the Eurochart Hot 100.

The song debuted at number 57 on the Billboard Hot 100 on the issue dated September 10, 1988 as the "Hot Shot Debut" of that week. It entered the top ten on the chart for the week of October 29, 1988 at number nine. The song reached its peak position of number five on the chart on the issue date of November 12, 1988.

With that accomplishment, Houston joined Madonna as just the second female artist to produce ten consecutive top ten singles on the Billboard Hot 100, surpassing Brenda Lee and the Supremes, who had nine. The song itself became the first and only Olympic anthem to become a top five pop hit. It spent four weeks in the top ten, ten weeks in the top 40 and 17 cumulative weeks on the chart altogether.

The song debuted on the Billboard Hot R&B/Hip-Hop Songs (formerly "Hot Black Singles") at number 78, the issue dated September 17, 1988, and six weeks later, on the week of October 22, reached a peak of 22, her lowest position on the R&B chart at the time. The song's lackluster performance on the R&B charts was the catalyst for pushing Houston towards more urban music as her next lead single, "I'm Your Baby Tonight", would be one of her first forays into the new jack swing genre that was popular at the time.

The song entered the Billboard Hot Adult Contemporary chart at number 40 on the week of September 10, 1988. Eight weeks later, on the issue date of October 29, 1988, the single peaked at number one on the Billboard Hot Adult Contemporary chart, replacing "A Groovy Kind of Love" by Phil Collins. It would become her seventh number one single on the chart, staying for two weeks. It was also the singer's eleventh consecutive top ten single on the Adult Contemporary chart. It ranked number 89 on the Billboard Hot 100 Year-End chart of 1988. In Canada, "One Moment in Time" peaked at number four, becoming Houston's 10th consecutive top-ten hit in the nation.

==== Europe and Oceania ====
Worldwide, it was a big hit. In the United Kingdom, the song entered the UK Singles Chart at number 24, the week ending date of September 24, 1988, and within four weeks of its release reached the top position replacing U2's "Desire", a peak it maintained for two weeks, becoming Houston's third UK number-one single. The single was certified Silver by the British Phonographic Industry (BPI) for shipments of 200,000 copies on October 1, 1988. According to The Official Charts Company, the single has sold 400,000 copies in the country. In West Germany, it debuted at number 58 on the Media Control Top 100 Singles chart, the week dated September 26, 1988, and the following week went straight into the top ten. On October 24, 1988, the fifth week of its release, the song reached number one on the chart and stayed there for two weeks, making it her second West German number-one hit. The single was certified Gold for shipments of 250,000 copies or more by the Bundesverband Musikindustrie (BVMI) in 1988. It peaked inside the top five in Austria, Belgium, Finland, Iceland, Norway, Sweden, and Switzerland, and reached top ten in France and the Netherlands. Its European success led to Houston achieving her second number one on the Eurochart Hot 100, peaking at that position for the week of the 15th of October 15, 1988, replacing Collins' "A Groovy Kind of Love" and staying there for five consecutive weeks. The single was a more moderate hit in Oceania region, peaking at number 53 and 34 on the singles chart, in Australia and New Zealand, respectively. The song re-entered the UK Singles Chart for week ending February 18, 2012, following Houston's death.

=== Critical reception ===
Pan-European magazine Music & Media described "One Moment in Time" as "a grand ballad in a pompous production by Narada Michael Walden." Cashbox called it an "anthemic ballad" that was "about striving to achieve your goals and dreams, a jock's "Greatest Love of All."

== Live performances ==
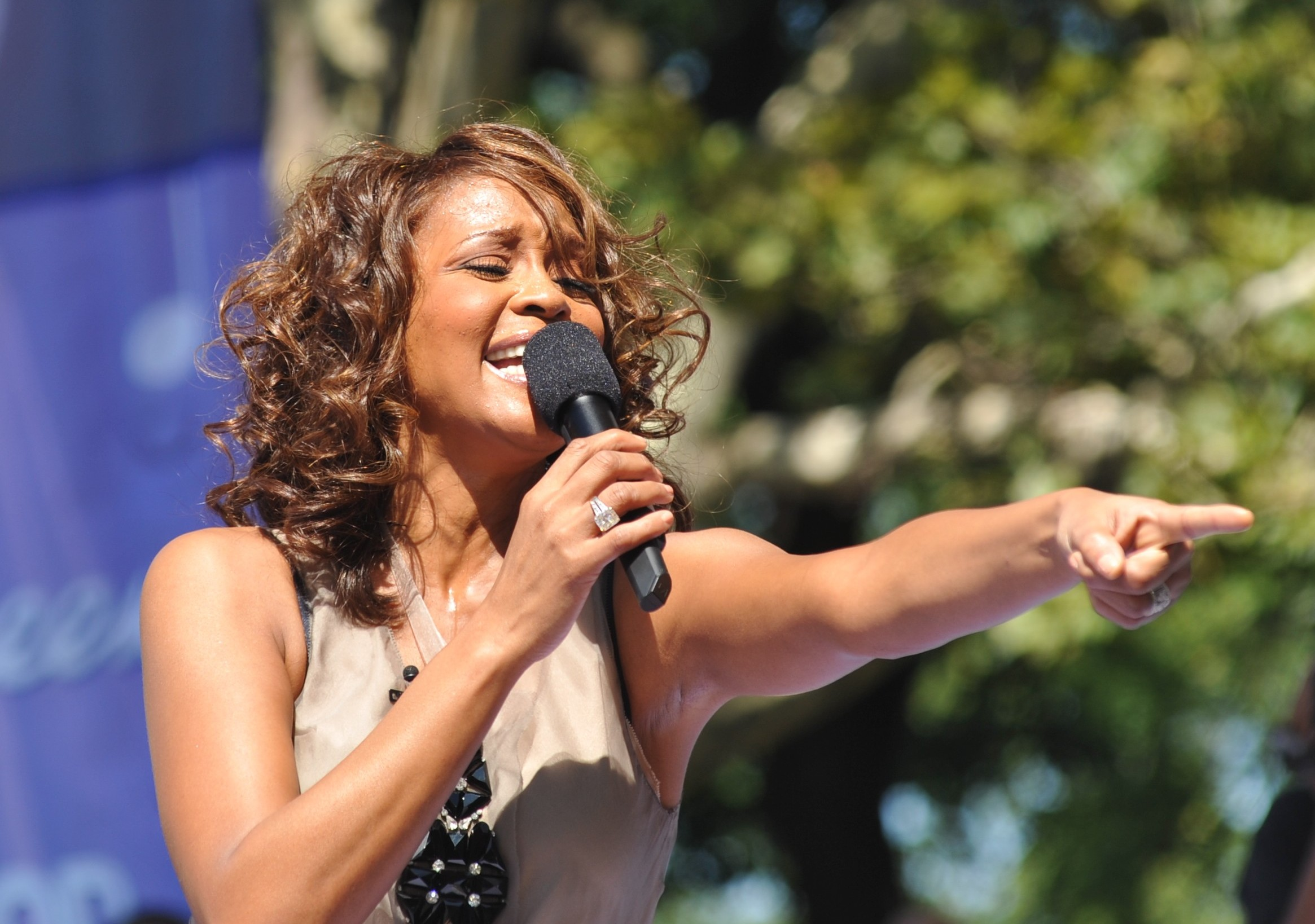
Houston (pictured in 2009) gave selected performances of "One Moment in Time" for special occasions.

Unlike most of her hit songs, Houston never included the song in any of her concert set lists on any of her tours. Instead, Houston only performed the song during special occasions, mostly at sporting-related events.

Houston's first live performance of the song occurred at the 31st Annual Grammy Awards on February 22, 1989, where she opened the live telecast without introduction after the airing of a monologue of Olympic athletes that participated in the Seoul Olympics. Houston's performance was so well received that the audience gave the singer a standing ovation.

This performance was broadcast live on CBS and released on the videos and CD: Grammy's Greatest Moments, Vol II (1994), and Whitney: The Greatest Hits (2000). It also appears on the CD/DVD Live: Her Greatest Performances.

Later, in the same year, Houston performed the song during Sammy Davis Jr.'s 60th Anniversary Celebration in Show Business, taped at the Shrine Auditorium in Los Angeles on November 13, 1989, and broadcast on ABC on February 4, 1990.

Three years later, Houston performed the song at the 1992 Olympic Flag Jam at Atlanta's Georgia Dome on September 17, 1992. The concert, which Houston co-hosted with Dick Clark, was organized to welcome the Olympic flag to Atlanta ahead of the city hosting the 1996 Summer Olympics.

Five years after that, Houston performed the song again at the US Open Tennis Championships: the Arthur Ashe Stadium Inauguration Ceremonies on August 25, 1997.

Houston also performed the song at the 2006 Winter Olympics in Torino, Italy on February 19, 2006, during a snowstorm. It was her first performance of the song in nine years.

== Music video ==
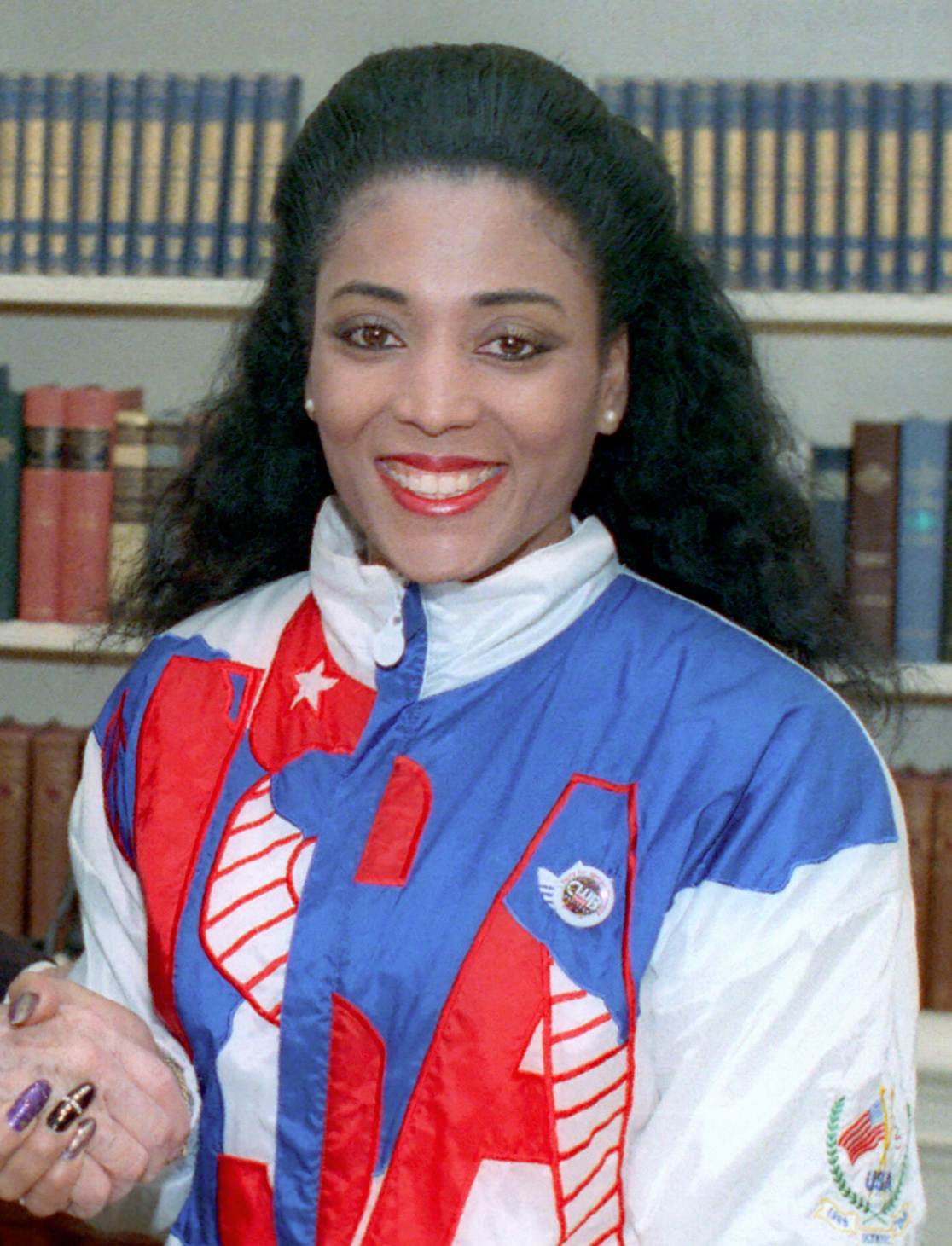
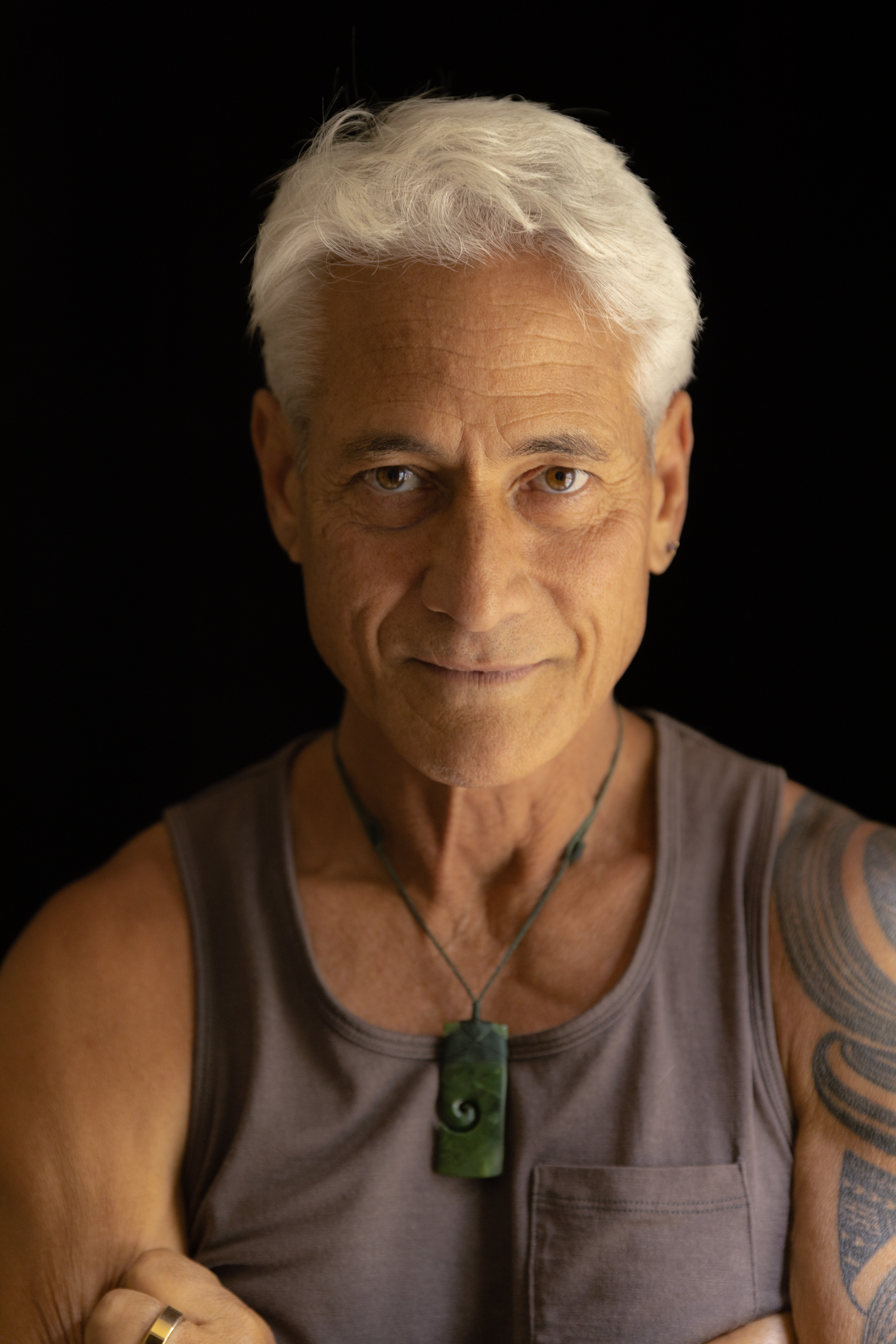
Florence Griffith Joyner and Greg Louganis were two of the Olympic athletes from the Seoul Olympics prominently featured in the music video to “One Moment in Time”.

Two music videos were produced for the song. One video showed children dreaming of becoming an Olympic medalist with scenes of their running, balancing on a beam, swimming and playing baseball. The latter contains various players in sports games. In that video, a three-minute-edited song from the original album version was played. A second video, which became the official clip and premiered in October 1988, was a basic collage of clips from the 1988 Summer Olympics.

The latter video opens with a black and white clip of the Olympic torch in Seoul with the Mannheim Steamroller song "Come Home to the Sea" being played throughout the opening until the lighting of the cauldron at the opening ceremony is shown, during which it fades to color. As the song plays throughout, more scenes from the Olympic games are shown.

When the chorus is sung for the last time, midway through it, scenes of the awarding of winners are depicted. The video ends with the aforementioned games' cauldron blazing.

The featured athletes include Florence Griffith Joyner, Steffi Graf, Greg Louganis, Carl Lewis, Janet Evans, Kennedy McKinney, Matt Biondi, Phoebe Mills, Rosa Mota, John Smith, and Sergey Bubka.

Since its upload on Houston's YouTube channel in September 2010, the official music video has been viewed more than 55 million times on the channel.

== Legacy and accolades ==
=== Awards and achievements ===
The record won Houston the Grammy Award nomination for Best Female Pop Vocal Performance at the 31st Annual Grammy Awards in February 1989, losing to "Fast Car" by Tracy Chapman.

The song also won a Grammy nomination for Best Song Written for Visual Media for the songwriters Albert Hammond and John Bettis, losing to "Two Hearts by Phil Collins and Lamont Dozier. The coverage of the song being aired during the NBC airings of the Seoul games led to Hammond, Bettis, Walden and Houston winning Sports Emmy Awards for the song.

For the Billboard year-end list of 1988, the power ballad was ranked the 89th best performing song of the year, becoming one of the singer's three songs to be included on the list including "So Emotional" and "Where Do Broken Hearts Go". It was ranked the 50th best performing song on the year-end adult contemporary list on the same magazine.

It was one of four Houston singles that made the top ten that year, with Houston spending 15 cumulative weeks inside the top ten of the chart and three cumulative weeks atop the Hot 100, which led to Houston winning a Billboard Number-One Award as the best female singles artist of 1988.

"One Moment in Time" holds the distinction of being the only top ten Olympics anthem in the history of the Billboard Hot 100.

=== Retrospective accolades ===
"One Moment in Time" is regarded by media outlets as one of Houston's best songs in her career as well as one of the greatest Olympic anthems recorded. Following Houston's death in 2012, Entertainment Weekly published a list of her 25 best songs and ranked it #14 because: "The Seoul Olympics needed an anthem, and Houston rose to meet the challenge with this majestic carpe diem chest-thumper. The song, a staple of sports montages, yielded one of Houston's all-time best performances at the 1989 Grammys ceremony." In their list of the 25 best Whitney Houston songs, Billboard ranked it #24 and wrote that the song "went a long way toward establishing Houston as a breathtaking vocal dynamo on the global stage for those who slept on her first two albums." Rolling Stone readers ranked it the 7th greatest Whitney Houston song of all time, stating that Houston "deliver[ed] one of the most triumphant climaxes of her career." Forbes ranked the song the sixth best Houston song, writing that the song "married sports and music in a way that was perfectly suitable for the purpose for which it was intended."

In a Newsweek article about the song, they wrote "it takes a special kind of song, a special kind of artist, and even a little bit of luck, to be able to step out of the shadow of the Olympic torch", citing the song for arguably being the "most memorable" of all Olympic anthems.

In 2016, Billboard ranked the song the greatest Olympic anthem out of seven listed. That same year, USA Today also ranked it first place among the best Olympics anthems ever released, writing that the song was "the gold standard by which all Olympic theme songs should be judged," while also calling it an "expertly constructed pop anthem, which gradually builds to a trumpeting finish as Houston belts 'I will be free'. It's a knockout performance that only she was capable of giving, and one that elevates this from a rousing torch song to a timeless classic." The Daily Emerald also ranked the song first place in their list of most memorable Olympics anthems, writing "Unlike every other song on this list, she could put her soul behind lyrics about the human drive for gold and genuinely make you believe it. By the end of the track, you'll feel capable of lifting a weight heavy enough to snap your brittle untrained arms in two".

=== Cover versions ===
"One Moment in Time" was performed live by then-11-year-old Teodora Sava in the auditions of the first edition of the Romanian children's talent show Next Star in 2013. Her performance gathered praise and positive reactions from all of the judges (who were seeing her for the first time) and online, and had 2.65 million combined YouTube views, making her well known to a wider audience in Romania and abroad. Soon after, she recorded the song in a studio.

British instrumental rock group the Shadows did a version on their 1989 album, Steppin' to the Shadows: 16 Great Tracks As Only the Shadows Can Play Them.

In 1998, diva Jane McDonald did a cover of the song that was included as the first track on her self-titled album.

Dana Winner also covered the song; her version has garnered more than 35 million views on YouTube.

According to WhoSampled, the Olympic theme ballad has been covered 88 times, making it one of Houston's most covered songs.

=== In popular culture ===
Appropriately for the song's origins as an Olympic anthem, British Olympic gold medal-winning heptathlete Denise Lewis selected the song as one of her eight recordings on the BBC's Desert Island Discs in February 2012. That same month, the song was featured at the beginning of the 2012 Brit Awards at London's O2 Arena in tribute to Houston (who had died earlier in the month), accompanied by a 30-second-video montage of her music videos.

The song was featured in the Saved by the Bell revival episode "Let the Games Begin." It was also included on the soundtrack to the 2022 biographical film Whitney Houston: I Wanna Dance with Somebody.

== Track listing and formats ==
- West Germany, 12" vinyl single/CD maxi-single / UK 12" vinyl single (Version 1)
1. "One Moment in Time" by Whitney Houston ― 4:42
2. "Midnight Wind" by Tony Carey ― 5:03
3. "Olympic Joy" (Instrumental) by Kashif ― 4:03
- UK, 12" vinyl single (Version 2)
1. "One Moment in Time" by Whitney Houston ― 4:42
2. "Olympic Joy" (Instrumental) by Kashif ― 4:03
3. "Rise to the Occasion" by Jermaine Jackson & Lala ― 4:43
- UK, 12" vinyl single (Version 3)
1. "One Moment in Time" by Whitney Houston ― 4:42
2. "Love Will Save the Day" (Jellybean Remix)
3. "Olympic Joy" (Instrumental) by Kashif ― 4:03
- UK / Europe 7" vinyl single
1. "One Moment in Time" by Whitney Houston ― 4:42
2. "Olympic Joy" (Instrumental) by Kashif ― 4:03
- US, 7" vinyl single
1. "One Moment in Time" ― 4:42
2. "Love Is a Contact Sport" ― 4:16
- West Germany, 5" CD maxi-single
1. "One Moment in Time" by Whitney Houston ― 4:42
2. "Olympic Joy" (Instrumental) by Kashif ― 4:03
3. "Rise to the Occasion" by Jermaine Jackson & Lala ― 4:43
4. "One Moment in Time" (Instrumental) ― 4:42
- JAPAN, 3" CD single
1. "One Moment in Time" by Whitney Houston ― 4:42
2. "Olympic Joy" (Instrumental) by Kashif ― 4:03

== Charts ==
=== Weekly charts ===
Chart (1988–1989)	Peak position
Australia (ARIA)	53
Austria (Ö3 Austria Top 40)	5
Belgium (Ultratop 50 Flanders)	3
Canada Top Singles (RPM)	4
Canada Retail Singles (The Record)	9
Denmark (Tracklisten)	7
Europe (Eurochart Hot 100)	1
Finland (Suomen virallinen lista)	5
France (SNEP)	8
Iceland (Íslenski Listinn Topp 10)	5
Ireland (IRMA)	2
Luxembourg (Radio Luxembourg)	2
Netherlands (Dutch Top 40)	6
Netherlands (Single Top 100)	6
New Zealand (Recorded Music NZ)	34
Norway (VG-lista)	3
Quebec (ADISQ)	9
South Africa (Springbok Radio)	21
Spain (AFYVE)	7
Sweden (Sverigetopplistan)	3
Switzerland (Schweizer Hitparade)	4
UK Singles (Official Charts)	1
US Billboard Hot 100	5
US Adult Contemporary (Billboard)	1
US Hot R&B/Hip-Hop Songs (Billboard)	22
US Top 100 Singles (Cashbox)	6
US Top Black Contemporary Singles (Cashbox)	19
US CHR/Pop Airplay (Radio & Records)	7
West Germany (GfK)	1

Chart (2012)	Peak position
Austria (Ö3 Austria Top 40)	34
France (SNEP)	61
Ireland (IRMA)	42
Spain (Promusicae)	26
South Korea International (Circle)	96
Switzerland (Schweizer Hitparade)	18
UK Singles (Official Charts)	40
UK Hip Hop/R&B (Official Charts)	11
US Digital Song Sales (Billboard)	56
US R&B/Hip-Hop Digital Song Sales (Billboard)	19

=== Year-end charts ===
Chart (1988)	Position
Belgium (Ultratop)	26
Canada Top Singles (RPM)	65
Europe (Eurochart Hot 100)	27
Netherlands (Single Top 100)	53
UK Singles (OCC)	14
US Billboard Hot 100	89
US Adult Contemporary (Billboard)	50
West Germany (Media Control)	32

== Certifications ==
Region	Certification	Certified units/sales
France (SNEP)	Silver	200,000^{*}
Germany (BVMI)	Gold	250,000^{^}
Sweden (GLF)	Gold	25,000^{^}
United Kingdom (BPI)	Gold	400,000^{‡}
United States (RIAA)	Gold	500,000^{‡}
^{*} Sales figures based on certification alone.^{^} Shipments figures based on certification alone.^{‡} Sales+streaming figures based on certification alone.

== Personnel ==
- Whitney Houston: vocals, vocal arranger
- Narada Michael Walden: producer, arranger, drums
- Walter "Baby Love" Afanasieff: keyboards
- Randy "The Emperor" Jackson: Moog Source synth bass
- Robert "Bongo Bob" Smith: SP-12 percussion, drum sampling, programming
- Ren Klyce: Fairlight synthesizer
- Vernon "Ice" Black: guitar
- The London Symphony Orchestra: orchestra
- Claytoven Richardson, Jeanie Tracy, Jim Gilstrap, Karen "Kitty Beethoven" Brewington, Lynette Stephens, Rosie Gaines, Walter Hawkins: background vocals

== See also ==
- List of European number-one hits of 1988
- List of number-one adult contemporary singles of 1988 (U.S.)
- List of number-one singles from the 1980s (UK)
- List of number-one hits of 1988 (Germany)

== Bibliography ==
- Walden, Narada Michael (2012). Whitney Houston: The Voice, The Music, The Inspiration. Insight Editions. ISBN 978-1-608-87200-8.
