= List of European number-one hits of 1988 =

This is a list of the European Hot 100 Singles and European Top 100 Albums number ones of 1988, as published by Music & Media magazine.

== Chart history ==
Key
†	Indicates best-performing single and album of 1988

Issue date	Song	Artist	Album	Artist	Ref.
9 January	"Always on My Mind"	Pet Shop Boys	Whenever You Need Somebody	Rick Astley	
16 January	No chart published				
23 January	"Always on My Mind"	Pet Shop Boys	Whenever You Need Somebody	Rick Astley	
30 January	"Always on My Mind"	Pet Shop Boys	Whenever You Need Somebody	Rick Astley	
6 February	"Heaven Is a Place on Earth"	Belinda Carlisle	Introducing the Hardline According to Terence Trent D'Arby	Terence Trent D'Arby	
13 February	"Heaven Is a Place on Earth"	Belinda Carlisle	Introducing the Hardline According to Terence Trent D'Arby	Terence Trent D'Arby	
20 February	"Always on My Mind"	Pet Shop Boys	Introducing the Hardline According to Terence Trent D'Arby	Terence Trent D'Arby	
27 February	"Always on My Mind"	Pet Shop Boys	Introducing the Hardline According to Terence Trent D'Arby	Terence Trent D'Arby	
5 March	"Tell It to My Heart"	Taylor Dayne	Introducing the Hardline According to Terence Trent D'Arby	Terence Trent D'Arby	
12 March	"Tell It to My Heart"	Taylor Dayne	Introducing the Hardline According to Terence Trent D'Arby	Terence Trent D'Arby	
19 March	"Together Forever"	Rick Astley	Introducing the Hardline According to Terence Trent D'Arby	Terence Trent D'Arby	
26 March	"I Should Be So Lucky" †	Kylie Minogue	Introducing the Hardline According to Terence Trent D'Arby	Terence Trent D'Arby	
2 April	"I Should Be So Lucky" †	Kylie Minogue	Dirty Dancing	Soundtrack	
9 April	"Tell It to My Heart"	Taylor Dayne	Dirty Dancing	Soundtrack	
16 April	"I Should Be So Lucky" †	Kylie Minogue	Dirty Dancing	Soundtrack	
23 April	"I Should Be So Lucky" †	Kylie Minogue	Dirty Dancing	Soundtrack	
30 April	"Heart"	Pet Shop Boys	Dirty Dancing	Soundtrack	
7 May	"Heart"	Pet Shop Boys	Dirty Dancing	Soundtrack	
14 May	"Heart"	Pet Shop Boys	Dirty Dancing	Soundtrack	
21 May	"Heart"	Pet Shop Boys	Dirty Dancing	Soundtrack	
28 May	"Heart"	Pet Shop Boys	Stronger Than Pride	Sade	
4 June	"Heart"	Pet Shop Boys	Lovesexy	Prince	
11 June	"Theme from S-Express"	S-Express	Stronger Than Pride	Sade	
18 June	"Theme from S-Express"	S-Express	Stronger Than Pride	Sade	
25 June	"Yéké Yéké"	Mory Kanté	Stronger Than Pride	Sade	
2 July	"Yéké Yéké"	Mory Kanté	Stronger Than Pride	Sade	
9 July	"Yéké Yéké"	Mory Kanté	Stronger Than Pride	Sade	
16 July	"Nothing's Gonna Change My Love for You"	Glenn Medeiros	Stronger Than Pride	Sade	
23 July	"Dirty Diana"	Michael Jackson	Bad †	Michael Jackson	
30 July	"Dirty Diana"	Michael Jackson	Bad †	Michael Jackson	
6 August	"Dirty Diana"	Michael Jackson	Bad †	Michael Jackson	
13 August	"Im Nin'alu"	Ofra Haza	Bad †	Michael Jackson	
20 August	"Im Nin'alu"	Ofra Haza	Bad †	Michael Jackson	
27 August	"The Loco-Motion"	Kylie Minogue	Bad †	Michael Jackson	
3 September	"The Loco-Motion"	Kylie Minogue	Bad †	Michael Jackson	
10 September	"The Loco-Motion"	Kylie Minogue	Bad †	Michael Jackson	
17 September	"The Only Way Is Up"	Yazz and the Plastic Population	Tracy Chapman	Tracy Chapman	
24 September	"The Only Way Is Up"	Yazz and the Plastic Population	Tracy Chapman	Tracy Chapman	
1 October	"The Only Way Is Up"	Yazz and the Plastic Population	Tracy Chapman	Tracy Chapman	
8 October	"A Groovy Kind of Love"	Phil Collins	Tracy Chapman	Tracy Chapman	
15 October	"One Moment in Time"	Whitney Houston	Tracy Chapman	Tracy Chapman	
22 October	"One Moment in Time"	Whitney Houston	Tracy Chapman	Tracy Chapman	
29 October	"One Moment in Time"	Whitney Houston	Rattle and Hum	U2	
5 November	"One Moment in Time"	Whitney Houston	Rattle and Hum	U2	
12 November	"One Moment in Time"	Whitney Houston	Rattle and Hum	U2	
19 November	"Girl You Know It's True"	Milli Vanilli	Rattle and Hum	U2	
26 November	"Don't Worry, Be Happy"	Bobby McFerrin	Rattle and Hum	U2	
3 December	"Don't Worry, Be Happy"	Bobby McFerrin	Money for Nothing	Dire Straits	
10 December	"Don't Worry, Be Happy"	Bobby McFerrin	Money for Nothing	Dire Straits	
17 December	"Don't Worry, Be Happy"	Bobby McFerrin	Money for Nothing	Dire Straits	
24 December	No chart published				
31 December	No chart published				
