= Living the Dream (Jane McDonald album) =

Studio album by English singer Jane McDonald

Studio album by Jane McDonald
- Released: 20 March 2026
- Studio: Blackbird (Nashville)
- Length: 48:50
- Label: Jeanie
- Producer: Seán Barry; Chris Eaton

Jane McDonald chronology
With All My Love (2024)	Living the Dream (2026)

Singles from Living the Dream
- 1. "Don't Mind If I Do" Released: 13 March 2026

Living the Dream is the twelfth studio album by the English singer Jane McDonald. It was released on 20 March 2026 by Jeanie Productions. The album's lead single, "Don't Mind If I Do", was released on 13 March 2026.

== Background ==
The album was conceived as a nod to country music and recorded at Nashville's Blackbird Studio. The project was announced alongside a 2026 United Kingdom tour and described by McDonald as a personal exploration of country storytelling. The lead single, "Don't Mind If I Do", was released ahead of the album; McDonald co-wrote the track with Chris Eaton and AJ Brown, with Eaton producing alongside Seán Barry.

== Commercial performance ==
On the midweek UK Albums Chart Update published by the Official Charts Company on 23 March 2026, Living the Dream was at number five. The album debuted at number 10 on the UK Albums Chart, on 27 March 2026, becoming McDonald's fifth Top 10 album in the United Kingdom. The album also debuted at number one on the UK Independent Albums Chart.

== Track listing ==
Living the Dream track listing
No.	Title	Writer(s)	Length
1.	"Living the Dream"	Jane McDonald; Seán Barry	3:55
2.	"Try a Little Kindness"	James Campbell; Reginald Connelly; Harry Woods	3:17
3.	"The Next Chapter"	McDonald; AJ Brown; Chris Eaton	4:23
4.	"Don't Mind If I Do"	Brown; Eaton	3:37
5.	"Heartache Tonight"	Glenn Frey; Don Henley; Bob Seger; John Souther	4:19
6.	"Right Where I Belong"	McDonald; Brown; Eaton	3:16
7.	"How Do I Move On"	McDonald; Wayne Pollock	3:31
8.	"Ain't Gonna Beg"	McDonald; Barry	4:15
9.	"Stuck in My Head"	McDonald; Brown; Eaton	3:48
10.	"I Saw the Light"	Lisa Angelle; Andrew Gold	3:49
11.	"Canada Skies"	McDonald; Brown; Eaton	3:48
12.	"Beautiful Soul"	McDonald; Brown; Eaton	3:25
13.	"To Know Him Is to Love Him"	Phil Spector	3:27
Total length:			48:50

== Personnel ==
Credits are adapted from Tidal.

- Jane McDonald – vocals
- Seán Barry – production (all tracks), keyboards (tracks 1, 7, 10), piano (7, 8), background vocals (8)
- Chris Eaton – production (all tracks), piano (3, 4, 12), programming (6)
- David Watts – mixing
- Sam Proctor – mastering
- Katie Holmes-Smith – background vocals (1–11)
- Abby Eaton – background vocals (1, 3–7, 9, 11)
- Jimmie Lee Sloas – bass (1, 3, 4, 6–9, 11, 12)
- Dan Needham – drums (1, 3, 4, 6–9, 11, 12)
- Dan Wheeler – guitar (1, 3, 4, 6–9, 11, 12)
- Gideon Klein – acoustic guitar, bass (2, 5, 10, 13); electric guitar (2, 10, 13)
- Gabe Klein – drums, keyboards, programming, engineering (2, 5, 10, 13)
- Jerry McPherson – guitar (3, 4, 6, 8, 9, 11, 12)
- Blair Masters – keyboards (3), piano (6, 9), Hammond organ (8, 9, 11), string production (12)
- Jacob Shaw – saxophone (4)
- Patrick Hayes – trombone (4)
- Josh Short – trumpet (4)
- Ben Sailors – electric guitar (5)
- Owen Parker – string production (7)
- Izzi Dunn – cello (7)

== Charts ==
Chart performance for Living the Dream
Chart (2026)	Peak position
Scottish Albums (OCC)	3
UK Albums (OCC)	10
UK Country Albums (OCC)	2
UK Independent Albums (OCC)	1
