= The Dyrt =

Subscription software for camping

- Website type: Outdoor/travel service
- Available in: English
- Founded: 2013
- Headquarters: Portland, Oregon, United States
- Founders: Sarah Smith and Kevin Long
- Industry: Travel, Outdoors
- Employees: 60
- Website: www.thedyrt.com
- Commercial: Yes

The Dyrt is consumer subscription software for camping, and the largest source of information for campgrounds throughout the United States, via a website and mobile app. The content on The Dyrt is user-generated as campers post photos, videos and reviews about campgrounds in the US. This content draws in 30 million visits per year. Campers can also book campsites on The Dyrt, which is commission-free for campground owners. The Dyrt PRO, a premium service that costs $59.99 annually, allows campers to access PRO maps that show free camping on public lands, download maps for offline use and plan camping road trips.

== History ==
Sarah Smith first had the idea for The Dyrt in 2013. She and her husband, The Dyrt co-founder and CEO Kevin Long, were both avid campers who went camping every weekend, but finding information on campgrounds was always a source of frustration and they would end up fighting every week about where to go. Smith had a career in international education but decided to focus full time on building The Dyrt. The first iteration of The Dyrt was a simple WordPress site. The vision was to make the Yelp for camping.

In 2015, Smith earned a coveted spot and spent six months at the Telluride Venture Accelerator. Not long after, Long left his job to join Smith and fully commit to The Dyrt.

One of the strategies employed to populate the website with photos, videos and reviews was to gamify the experience for users. The Dyrt partnered with 27 outdoor brands and held competitions in every state and offered prizes to the top-ranking users for submitting content. Campers who are regular visitors to The Dyrt post reviews and photos and climb the ranks. Members of The Dyrt community become “Rangers,” “Guides” and “Legends” on the site. The Dyrt now has over 4 million campground reviews, photos and tips.

When the Covid pandemic hit in March 2020, The Dyrt employees began to work remotely. This ended up becoming a permanent situation in 2021 when the lease on the office space was allowed to expire. The Dyrt employees can work from anywhere in US timezones if they have strong internet service for a video call. They can also be paid bonuses for using The Dyrt to find camping and documenting the experience.

Smith was named to the 2022 Inc. Female Founders 100 list of the top women entrepreneurs. The Dyrt was named to the Inc. 5000 list of fastest growing companies each year from 2022 through 2026 and was recognized in the app category of Fast Company's World Changing Ideas Awards in 2023.

== The Dyrt PRO ==
The Dyrt PRO is a premium service that costs $59.99 annually and provides additional features to The Dyrt's free app. The Dyrt PRO members can access PRO Maps that show free dispersed camping on public lands, download maps for offline use and plan camping road trips. PRO members can also book campsites on The Dyrt without paying any extra bookings fees. The Dyrt partners with more than 1,000 campgrounds across the US at which PRO subscribers get a 40 percent discount.

Due to increased traffic to National Park destinations and tourist areas, The Dyrt focuses on relieving pressure on the country's most popular camping sites and being committed to the Leave No Trace set of outdoor ethics.

== Commission-free bookings and Instant Book ==
In 2021, The Dyrt launched its Instant Book feature in which campers can reserve campsites on The Dyrt, which does not charge a commission to campground owners. Sarah Smith explained the new program in an interview with Glamping Business Americas Magazine.

As we began opening up our marketplace to campgrounds, we saw an entirely different segment of campground owners from non-traditional campgrounds. These were individuals with private land looking for ways to generate passive or active income by hosting campers. They don’t have a built-in base for demand and they were actively looking for ways to market their properties. We designed our campground product to be inclusive for all hosts.

== Cross-country vanlife trip ==
In 2021, Smith and Long embarked on a cross-country vanlife trip in their camper van during which they managed The Dyrt and fundraised remotely. During this trip, The Dyrt secured $11 million in Series B funding to support a new round of hiring.

Smith and Long left Portland in July 2021 and headed east, stopping and working at campgrounds and RV parks along the way. Smith and Long were able to continue running the company from their van by using an antenna to pull in nearby cellular service with SIM cards in the van acting as mobile hotspots.

== Camping Report ==
In January 2023, The Dyrt released its 2023 Camping Report based on a survey of its users and camping property hosts. Called "the statistically most meaningful picture of what it’s like to go camping in America" by RV Travel, key findings included:

- 15 million new campers in the US since 2021
- It was 5 times harder to find an available campsite to book in 2022 than it was in 2019
- Glamping increased 10% in 2022
- Nearly half of private camping properties added capacity in 2022
- Solo camping increased 28% between 2021 and 2022
