= Star Treatment =

TV make-over show

- Presented by: Jane McDonald
- Country of origin: United Kingdom
- Original language: English
- No. of series: 1
- No. of episodes: 15

Production
- Running time: 60 minutes (inc. adverts)
- Production company: Shiver Productions

Original release
- Network: ITV
- Release: 19 August – 6 September 2013

Star Treatment is a British television show that aired on ITV from 19 August to 6 September 2013 and was hosted by Jane McDonald.

== Format ==
Star Treatment sees presenter Jane McDonald and the 'Style Team', consisting of Cassie Lomas (Make-up), Lorraine McCulloch (Fashion) and Andrew Trott-Barn (Hair) as they visit workplaces around the Midlands and Wales, in offices, factories, clubs and institutions. The team give a star treatment makeover to the colleagues who have been nominated by their bosses. As a way to thank them for their hard work and positive attitude in the workplace.

Whilst the workers are being treated to their 'star' makeover, their boss works alongside top chef (Ricky Andalcio) to prepare a surprise gourmet meal for them. At the end of the day, the workers walk the catwalk in the company of their family and friends, who come along to show their support, before they are treated to their gourmet meal.

Not to be confused with the 1979 Southern Television series Star Treatment in which young, up-and-coming entertainers were given an opportunity to showcase their talent.
