= Jane McDonald (album) =

Studio album by Jane McDonald
- Released: 1998
- Genre: Vocal pop
- Length: 54:37
- Label: Focus Music International

Jane McDonald chronology
Jane McDonald (1998)	Inspiration (2000)

Jane McDonald is the debut studio album by the English singer Jane McDonald, released in 1998 by Focus Music International. It is a covers album of popular songs. The album peaked at number one on the UK Albums Chart. It also reached number 44 in New Zealand in April 1999.

== Track listing ==
1. "One Moment in Time" – 4:40
2. "The Twelfth of Never" – 4:41
3. "Do You Know the Way to San Jose" – 3:35
4. "You're My World" – 3:06
5. "How Do I Live" – 3:56
6. "(You Make Me Feel Like a) Natural Woman" – 3:11
7. "The Wind Beneath My Wings" – 4:21
8. "Downtown" – 3:32
9. "Have I Told You Lately" – 4:50
10. "When I Fall in Love" – 3:31
11. "I'll Never Love This Way Again" – 4:01
12. "Some You Win Some You Lose" – 3:48
13. "You Don't Have to Say You Love Me" – 2:50
14. "I Will Always Love You" – 4:35

== Charts ==
=== Weekly charts ===
Chart (1998)	Peak position
New Zealand Albums (RMNZ)	44
Scottish Albums (OCC)	5
UK Albums (OCC)	1

=== Year-end charts ===
Chart (1998)	Position
UK Albums (OCC)	47

== Certifications ==
Region	Certification	Certified units/sales
United Kingdom (BPI)	Platinum	300,000^{^}
^{^} Shipments figures based on certification alone.
