= Lucy Siegle =

British journalist and writer

- Born: 8 November 1974 (age 51); Chester, England, United Kingdom
- Occupations: Journalist, author, broadcaster
- Spouse: Ben Siegle (m. 2000)

Lucy Siegle (born 8 November 1974) is a British journalist and writer on environmental issues. She is a reporter on The One Show.

== Career ==
=== Writing ===
After working for a textile company in South London, Siegle joined The Observer Magazine (then Life magazine) as an administrator in 2000. She has said she had no ambitions to write at the time but that the editorial team nurtured her ability and were enthused by her interest in environmental issues. She wrote her first feature in 2001 on London's new Civil Partnerships and then has gone on to write articles, features and op-ed pieces for The Guardian group, among other publications on themes of environmental and social justice.

In 2004, Siegle went freelance, editing a section for Marie Claire UK magazine and became a columnist on ethical living for The Observer. In the same year, Siegle founded and launched the Observer Ethical Awards which celebrated their tenth anniversary in an awards ceremony at the V&A Museum in London.

Her books include Green Living in the Urban Jungle (Green Books 2001), A Good Life (Guardian books, contributing author) and To Die For: is fashion wearing out the world? (Fourth Estate 2011). To Die For was nominated for the Orwell Prize 2012. It forms the basis of the 2015 documentary The True Cost, by director Andrew Morgan. Siegle appears in the movie and was one of the executive producers.

=== Television ===
Siegle is a reporter on the nightly BBC One programme The One Show, having joined in 2007. In 2009 and 2012, she stood in as co-presenter of The One Show on several occasions.

She speaks on environmental issues on Sky News and Good Morning Britain. She was a contestant on the BBC's Pointless Celebrities.

Siegle has chaired several debates on the fashion industry in the House of Commons and House of Lords taken part in main stage debates at the Royal Society and in 2016 interviewed both Dame Vivienne Westwood and Stella McCartney live on stage, the latter as part of the Kering sustainability Awards in London In December 2016, she hosted the APSE in Blackpool.

=== Fashion ===
Siegle is critical of large fast fashion brands pretending to be ethical. She has said the whole UK movement is in danger of being co-opted and bought up by big brands and has been particularly critical of clothes recycling initiatives.

Siegle is credited by friend and colleague Livia Firth with devising the Green Carpet Challenge (now run by Firth and her Eco Age brand). Together Firth and Siegle attended the 2011 Oscars to promote sustainable fashion and have worked on other events such as the Met Ball and the Golden Globes and BAFTAs.

Siegle has also directed a short film, Green Cut, on sustainable fashion that was screened at the 2012 London Film Festival.

In 2014, Siegle travelled to the Brazilian Amazon and on her return, established a project with Firth and Gucci to produce zero deforestation handbags.

== Personal life ==
Siegle married Ben Siegle in 2000 in an eco wedding at Hazelwood House in South Devon.

== Publications ==
- Green Living in the Urban Jungle. Green Books Ltd, 2001.
- A Good Life. Co-author. London: Transworld / The Guardian, 2005.
- To Die For. Fourth Estate, HarperCollins, 2010.
- Turning the Tide on Plastic. Trapeze, 2018.
