= The One Show =

British television magazine and chat show programme

- Genre: News magazine
- Presented by: Alex Jones; Roman Kemp; JB Gill; Lauren Laverne; Clara Amfo; Vernon Kay; See full list)
- Country of origin: United Kingdom
- Original language: English
- No. of episodes: 4,408

Production
- News editor: Rob Unsworth
- Production locations: The Mailbox (2006); BBC Media Village (2007–2013); Studio V, Broadcasting House (2014–)
- Running time: 30–60 minutes
- Production company: BBC Studios Factual Entertainment Productions

Original release
- Network: BBC One (2006–present); BBC Two (occasionally, see below)
- Release: 14 August 2006 – present

The One Show is a British television magazine and chat show programme. Broadcast live on BBC One weekdays at 7:00 pm, it features topical stories and studio guests. It is currently co-hosted by a team of presenters including Alex Jones, Roman Kemp, JB Gill and Lauren Laverne, as well as others. Various reporters also assist with subject-specific presenting, both in the studio and on location, or through filmed segments. Originally produced in Birmingham and then in the BBC Media Village in White City, London, since 2014 the studio has been based in Broadcasting House, the BBC's headquarters in London.

Launched with a pilot series in 2006, leading to a full series from 2007, it has had various previous permanent and temporary hosts. After initial low ratings, the partnership of Adrian Chiles and Christine Bleakley from 2007 to 2010 has been credited with boosting ratings and establishing the show as a popular staple of British viewing. The longest-serving partnership was between Jones and Matt Baker, who hosted together between 2011 and 2020.

The programme is usually 30 minutes long, although it is occasionally extended to an hour. It runs all year round, apart from a two-week break at Christmas and a four-week summer holiday, with the summer slot filled with a highlights show, The One Show: Best of British, presented by Matt Allwright and Lucy Siegle. In 2020 the consumer affairs programme Watchdog became a slot on the One Show, on Wednesdays at 19:00. When River City is broadcast on BBC One Scotland, The One Show is not broadcast on Tuesdays and Thursdays in Scotland.

Launching the full series represented a major financial commitment for the BBC, and was seen by it as a first test of a wide-ranging restructuring of the BBC's production arm into a more flexible and creative organisation, with the show seen as a potential platform for piloting other programme ideas.

== Format ==
As a topical magazine programme, The One Show covers a variety of stories, ranging from light-hearted humour to serious issues or tragic current events. The broadcast features a mix of in-studio presenting, outside live broadcasting, and pre-recorded segments. Reporters and other experts are included to provide contributions on various topics, both in the studio and as part of segments. Special guests are usually introduced at the top of the show, and remain throughout, often being encouraged to interact with it in various ways, as opposed to simply answering questions.

Inside the studio, videotaping is done in front of a small standing audience, and focuses on two sofas (one for the two presenters, one for guests and contributors) arranged around a coffee table, often serving a practical use, e.g. during food tasting. Use of the forecourt of Broadcasting House for outside live broadcasts is common, allowing for a larger audience and/or a bigger stage for a performance or demonstration.

The show often takes an active part in events such as Comic Relief/Sport Relief and Children in Need. Cross-promotion of other BBC shows is common, although under BBC rules the show cannot give the BBC preferential coverage.

Typically the show airs in a 7pm timeslot on BBC One; however, it is occasionally moved later in the evening or to BBC Two to allow BBC One to broadcast extended breaking news coverage or due to overrunning sports events such as Wimbledon. Non England BBC regions such as Wales or Northern Ireland show the programme on BBC2 slightly more than English transmitters due to regional programmes being shown on BBC1 in those areas.

== History ==
The One Show was initially commissioned for a four-week trial run. It was broadcast on weeknights at 6:55 pm between 14 August and 8 September 2006. The programme was billed as a topical magazine show that was to showcase stories of interest from around the United Kingdom. The trial was hosted by Adrian Chiles and Nadia Sawalha, featuring reports from a variety of people across the UK. The show was intended to be an updated version of the BBC news magazine show Nationwide (1969–83).

After favourable viewing figures for the pilot, the show returned for a full series after being revamped on 9 July 2007. Team members were Adrian Chiles, studio presenter; Hardeep Singh Kohli, head roving reporter; and 13 other reporters or contributors. A number of changes were made to the format. The show was moved from Birmingham to London. Sawalha was replaced by Myleene Klass. Klass then left in August to give birth to her first child, and was replaced by Christine Bleakley. The line-up was completed by the addition of a new team of reporters. The show replaced Real Story, and Holiday. As part of the revamp, the show's logo was changed to align with the new BBC One lowercase logo design, although it was not changed again when the BBC One logo was changed once more in 2021.

The show's 400th episode aired on 18 March 2009; this was an hour long instead of the usual 30 minutes. From September 2009, The One Show included a 60-minute episode every week, after successfully trying the format in May 2009. The hour-long format continued until December 2009, and was revived in April 2011.

On 13 April 2010, it was announced the show was being revamped with an hour-long Friday episode, to be hosted by Chris Evans. He was not due to start until after the summer break, but prior to this, both Chiles and Bleakley left the show. Chiles departed first, this being announced on 19 April, his last appearance being on 30 April. His replacement was announced on 26 May as Jason Manford, to begin in July. Bleakley continued alongside stand-ins until the last show before the break, on 10 June 2010, with her departure confirmed during the break, on 8 July. The BBC had also confirmed that following the break, The One Show would be broadcast in high-definition, with the set updated to HD standards.

The show returned on 12 July with stand-in presenters. On 26 July, S4C presenter Alex Jones was announced as the new female co-host. The new lineup of Jones and Manford on Monday to Thursday, and Jones and Evans on Friday, did not debut until the week beginning 16 August, Evans' first show being Friday 20 August.

On Friday 19 November, it was announced Manford was resigning due to his involvement in a "sexting" scandal; his last show had aired that Wednesday, for – owing to the Children in Need telethon being on Friday – Chris Evans had presented the end-of-week episode on Thursday. Filling in, Jones was joined by guest presenters including Matt Baker, Alexander Armstrong, and Matt Allwright on Monday to Thursday, with Evans also presenting extra episodes on occasion.

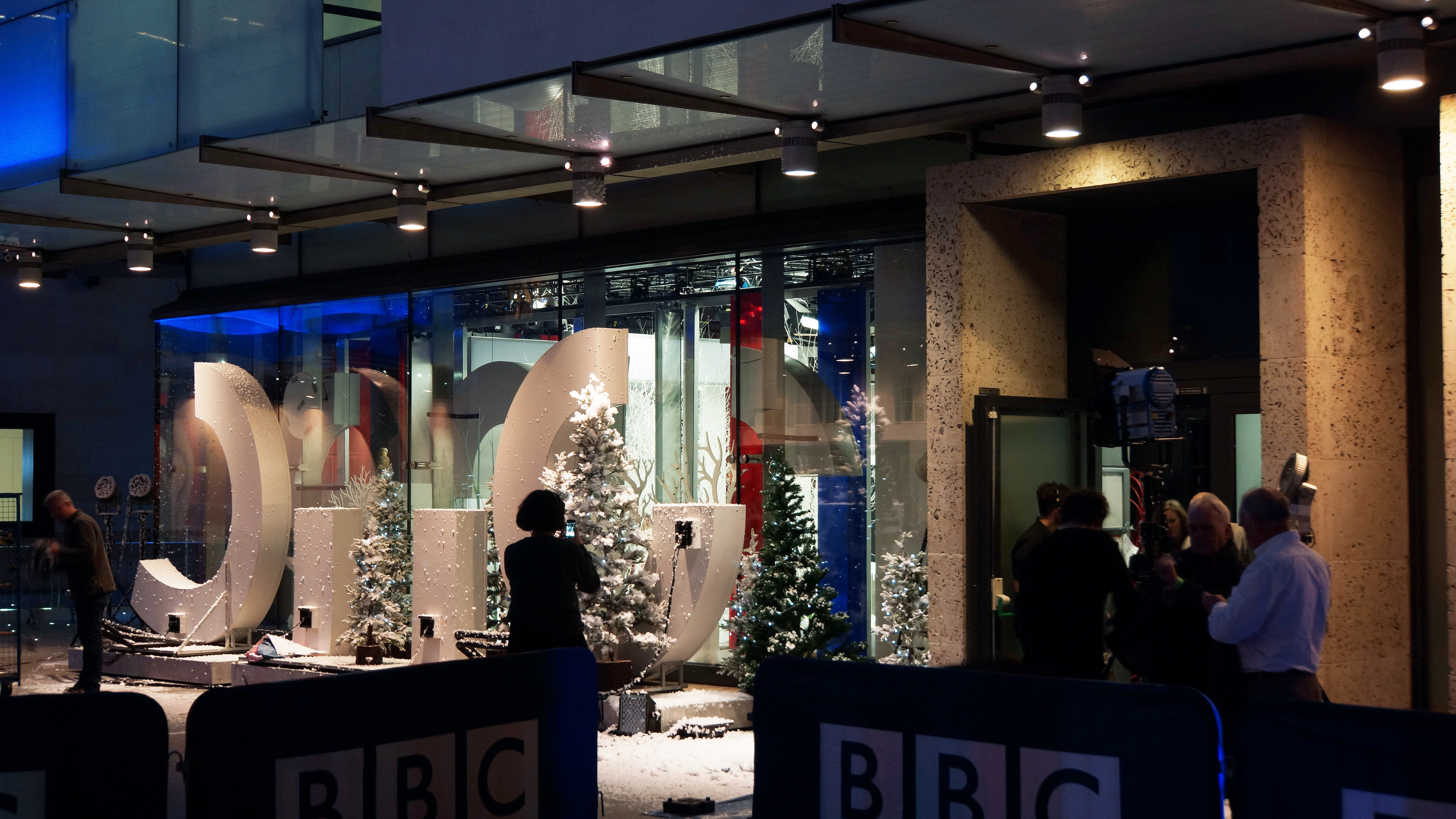
Shooting stage outside the studio

The show began broadcasting from New Broadcasting House on 6 January 2014 with revamped opening title sequence graphics. The opening sequence is also enhanced for the run-up to Christmas each year with extra vocals and visual sparkle.

On 25 January 2011, Matt Baker was announced as Manford's replacement. On 19 June 2015 it was announced Evans would be leaving, his last show being 10 July 2015. Following the departure of Evans, the Friday show has been presented by Jones alongside various guest presenters, the first being Patrick Kielty on 17 July.

On 26 January 2015, an FA Cup draw was performed on the show for the first time, for the 2014–15 FA Cup fifth round proper. The BBC regained the broadcasting rights for the Cup from that season and since then, draws have been a semi-regular occurrence on the programme.

On 1 February 2016, the show broadcast an extended one-hour tribute to TV and radio host Sir Terry Wogan, who had died the previous day. This format was repeated (albeit for the usual 30-minute duration) on 31 March 2016 as a tribute to comedian Ronnie Corbett who had died earlier in the day.

On 17 May 2016, the show broadcast a 25-minute EastEnders special, EastEnders: Last Orders, to mark the end of the era of the character Peggy Mitchell, who was to be leaving the soap for the final time; the show went out live from Albert Square, with cast members talking about Peggy and the show itself.

On 6 January 2017, Jones presented her last show before going on maternity leave; guest presenters Angela Scanlon and Michelle Ackerley began to take over for Jones effective 9 January. Jones called into the show on 26 January to announce that she had given birth to a baby boy.

In April 2019, Jones went on maternity leave for a second time. Jones' maternity cover was provided by: Michelle Ackerley, Angellica Bell, and Angela Scanlon, among others.

On 4 December 2019, Matt Baker announced he would leave the show in spring 2020 to spend more time with his family, but reassured viewers that he would continue to work with the BBC. Baker left on 31 March 2020, and the BBC confirmed that he would not be replaced, with the programme instead relying on guest hosts to present alongside Jones on a permanent basis.

In February 2020, the BBC Watchdog consumer affairs series was discontinued as a standalone programme after 35 years, becoming a segment on The One Show to be presented by Matt Allwright and Nikki Fox on Wednesdays at 19:00.

In July 2020, The One Show aired its 3,000th edition. It aired on 3 July, and was presented by Alex Jones and Alex Scott. In April 2021, the BBC announced Jermaine Jenas and Ronan Keating as "new permanent co-presenters". Jenas presents Mondays to Wednesdays and Keating on Thursdays and Fridays. Speaking on The One Show that evening, Jones said: "We'll still have Amol, and Alex Scott, and Rylan, and the lovely Michael Ball popping in now and again, as well."

In August 2021, Jones went on maternity leave ahead of the birth of her third child.

In August 2023, ahead of the show's return from its summer break, it was announced Roman Kemp would be joining the show as an official presenter alongside Jones and Jenas. He had been guest-presenting the show for a year. Keating, it was announced, would be stepping back as a main presenter but would be "continuing to host shows". It was also announced that Lauren Laverne had also officially joined the presenting team, having been a guest presenter since 2021. On 22 August 2024, it was announced that Jermaine Jenas, who had been a The One Show co-host since 2021 alongside his work as a football pundit for the network, had been sacked by the BBC following allegations of "inappropriate behaviour", thus ending his role on The One Show and in BBC Sport's football output.

== Production ==
The pilot show was transmitted from a temporary studio built at The Mailbox complex in Birmingham. It was produced by BBC Birmingham, with production input from various BBC regions. When The One Show returned for a full series, it was moved to BBC Media Village in White City, London, in 2007. It moved again to Broadcasting House in January 2014.

On 23 February 2011, the fire alarm at the BBC White City studios went off, causing the programme to be taken off air and the remainder of the show was replaced with a recording of Nigel Slater's Simple Suppers.

== Ratings ==
In 2014, the show was attracting an average daily audience of 5 million viewers. It received its lowest ever audience on Friday 24 June 2011, with just 1.92 million tuning in; the reason for this unusually low figure was the show was unexpectedly moved to BBC Two after a Wimbledon match overran. The trend to a Friday ratings slump coincided with Evans' being handed the role of co-host for the pre-weekend edition in early 2011. The show shed two million viewers for the Friday edition after Evans joined the programme.

The show reached a 12-month-high audience on 18 January 2013 of 5.83 million viewers.

== Unofficial podcast ==
An unofficial companion podcast, The The One Show Show, launched in 2018. Presented by writer and comedian Jon Holmes with co-host Marc Haynes and guests, it "takes a deep dive into TV's shallowest programme". The weekly show (in two parts) analyses The One Show in detail. A live version of the podcast in 2019 featured the guest Fi Glover. Other guests have included Jane Garvey and Jay Rayner.

== Presenters ==
=== Current presenters ===
Presenter	Duration
Alex Jones	2010–
Roman Kemp	2022–
Lauren Laverne	2023–
Angellica Bell	2007-
Clara Amfo	2023-
Vernon Kay	2024-

=== Relief presenters ===
Presenter	Duration
Gabby Logan	2009–2010, 2013–
Gethin Jones	2009, 2020–
Alex Scott	2020-

=== Former presenters ===
Presenter	Duration
Adrian Chiles	2006–2010
Nadia Sawalha	2006–2007
Myleene Klass	2007
Christine Bleakley	2007–2010
Chris Evans	2010–2015
Jason Manford	2010
Matt Baker	2011–2020
Jermaine Jenas	2021–2024
Ronan Keating	2021–2023

=== The One Show: Best of Britain presenters ===
Presenter	Duration
Louise Minchin	2010–2014
Matt Allwright	2010–2014

== Reporters ==
=== Current ===
- General
  - Ade Adepitan
  - Matt Allwright
  - Angela Scanlon
  - Angellica Bell
  - Gyles Brandreth
  - Joe Crowley
  - Michael Douglas
  - Carrie Grant
  - Andy Kershaw
  - Alex Riley
  - John Sergeant
  - Lucy Siegle
  - Iwan Thomas
  - Lauren Layfield
  - Lindsey Russell
- Consumer affairs
  - Dan Donnelly
  - Dominic Littlewood
  - Anita Rani
  - Angela Rippon
  - Justin Rowlatt
  - Nick Wallis
  - Jasmine Harman
- Current affairs
  - Helen Fospero
  - Fiona Foster
  - Andy Kershaw
  - Anita Rani
  - Alex Riley
  - Lucy Siegle
- Nature and wildlife
  - Mike Dilger
  - Miranda Krestovnikoff
  - Dr George McGavin
- Crime
  - Dan Donnelly
- Health and medical
  - Dr Sarah Jarvis
  - Dr Mark Porter
- Weather
  - Carol Kirkwood
- History
  - Gyles Brandreth
  - Joe Crowley
  - Ruth Goodman
  - Larry Lamb
  - David Olusoga - wills
  - Arthur Smith - cultural
  - Dan Snow
- Food
  - Jay Rayner
  - Ricky Andalcio
  - Nadiya Hussain
- Gardening
  - Christine Walkden
- Holidays
  - Christine Walkden
- Sport
  - Phil Tufnell
- Art critic
  - Phil Tufnell
- Music
  - Carrie Grant
  - Andy Kershaw
  - Cerys Matthews
  - Richard Mainwaring
- Culture
  - Cerys Matthews
  - Arthur Smith
- Hairstyles
  - Michael Douglas
- Science & Technology
  - Marty Jopson
- Scotland
  - Sarah Mack
- Accents
  - Alistair McGowan
- Adventure
  - Andy Torbet
- Business Advice
  - Theo Paphitis
- Space
  - Tim Peake

=== Former ===
- General reporters:
  Clare Balding
  Kaye Adams
  Anna Adams
  Matt Baker
  Rajesh Mirchandani
  Carol Thatcher
  Hardeep Singh Kohli
  Myleene Klass
  Iain Lee
  Colin Jackson
  Paraic O'Brien
  Paddy O'Connell
  David Whiteley
- Composer:
  Mitch Benn
- Nature and wildlife
  Kate Humble
  Ellie Harrison
  David Lindo
- Financial
  Martin Lewis
- Astronomy
  Mark Thompson
- Dance
  Arlene Phillips
- Crime
  Rav Wilding
  Martin Bayfield
- Health and medical
  Dr Phil Hammond
  Dr Michael Mosley
- Weather
  Peter Gibbs
- History
  Neil Oliver
- Domestic pets
  Joe Inglis
- Culture
  Tony Livesey

== Controversies ==
=== Carol Thatcher ===
Carol Thatcher did not have her short-term contract as a One Show roving reporter renewed after the BBC refused to accept her apology following an allegedly racist comment made in January 2009 following filming. It was made during a private conversation between her, presenter Adrian Chiles and a guest, comedian Jo Brand, but the comment was subsequently reported to BBC staff. Thatcher argued that the comment had been meant in jest, and that she considered the way the incident had been handled to be a breach of trust, for which she expected an apology from the BBC.

=== Jordan Shelley ===
Screen capture of Roxy on The One Show

On 15 September 2011, The One Show presenters introduced what they described as a new member of The One Show family, dog trainer Jordan Shelley. The following day, he was shown treating a problem of food guarding by a Jack Russell Terrier. Using confrontational methods, he forced the dog away from the bowl, stepping on its foot and getting bitten in the process. Presenter Alex Jones remarked that "some people out there might argue that some of your techniques were a little aggressive".

The harm caused was condemned by dog welfare professionals and organisations.

=== Jeremy Clarkson ===
On 30 November 2011, more than 21,000 complaints were received because Jeremy Clarkson made two offensive comments on the show, one in relation to the recent public sector strikes (that striking public sector workers should be "executed in front of their families"), and another on suicide. The One Show apologised for the suicide comment. The incident registered 763 complaints to regulator Ofcom, the third highest recorded in 2011.

=== Jimmy Carr ===
Two jokes told by comedian Jimmy Carr on 4 November 2015 episode were referred to regulator Ofcom for investigation regarding their potentially discriminatory nature. The jokes were found to be in breach of their broadcasting code, leading the BBC to alter its existing arrangements for ensuring guests do not swear or use offensive language to also explicitly discourage jokes made at the expense of minorities.

=== Paul O'Grady ===
The BBC received complaints that while being interviewed in January 2014 about the issue of benefit reform, the Labour Party supporter and television presenter Paul O'Grady was not adequately challenged on his views, described as forthright in their condemnation of the Channel 4 documentary Benefits Street. The BBC responded by arguing that a variety of opinions had been heard, and that balance need not be addressed simply through a single programme.

=== Rita Ora ===
Singer Rita Ora generated hundreds of complaints to the BBC over her choice of clothing for a 5 January 2015 appearance on the show, in which she wore a trouser suit with nothing underneath the jacket, the fit of which exposed her full cleavage. The BBC defended her clothing as being broadly in line with most viewers' expectations of a pop star's choice of attire, while also making clear it would have requested a more modest outfit had she consulted with them first.

=== Jermaine Jenas ===
On 22 August 2024, it was announced that the BBC had dismissed Jermaine Jenas as presenter, due to "inappropriate behaviour".
