= Bob Bull =

British entrepreneur

- Born: Robert Bull Jr.
- Occupation: Businessman
- Years active: 2007–present
- Known for: Head of RoyaleLife
- Spouse: Sara Nilsen
- Children: 2

Robert Bull Jr. is a British businessman who managed caravan park companies. His net worth rose to around £1.9 billion before his company RoyaleLife was declared bankrupt in 2023. He received large loans from Topland Group, ICG plc, and Avenue Capital Group.

== Early life and education ==
Robert Bull Jr. was born to Bob Bull Sr and is Romani. His grandfather started a caravan park in 1945, and the rest of his family joined the business. Bull Sr. was a millionaire by the 1990s, but lost his money due to Black Wednesday. Bull Jr. dropped out of school at age 13 in order to work at his father's caravan park. He later attended the Embley private school and interned at an attorney's office.

== Career ==
=== Early career ===
In 2007, Bull acquired his first caravan park, which was next to one owned by his father. Bull pled guilty to unfair commercial practices in 2013, after he sold retirement caravans that were on land approved for temporary holiday accommodation. He provided compensation to the people he sold the caravans to and received a small fine. Bull declared bankruptcy on 7 March 2016, with around £3.5 million in debts.

=== RoyaleLife ===
RoyaleLife was founded after Bull's father gave him a loan of £9.7 million to restart his business career. Around 200 companies were loosely affiliated with RoyaleLife. RoyaleLife acquired its first property in 2017, after Bull purchased one from family and friends in the Romani community. Bull acquired hundreds of rural plots for use as caravan parks using money borrowed from private equity and hedge funds. Half of the parks acquired by RoyaleLife were fields or "land in the middle of nowhere".

The first private loan for RoyaleLife was £45 million from Topland Group. ICG plc initially gave RoyaleLife a £200 million loan and loaned the company millions more. Sun Communities considered purchasing RoyaleLife for up to £2 billion. Avenue Capital Group gave the company a £186 million loan. One of RoyaleLife's property was a site used by paintball players to reenact the Battle of Nam Dong; it was initially valued below £3.8 million, but Bull had it revalued to £79 million and used as collateral for a loan.

Some of the loans Bull received were given to members of his family. RoyaleLife acquired properties from Bull's family at inflated values. Senior roles in the company were held by Bull's son, sister, and father. Bull took £300 million in personal loans from RoyaleLife and said that his family took £5 million from the company per year.

Bull's net worth was around £1.9 billion and The Sunday Times listed him as the 88th richest Briton in 2023. Bull was given the nickname "Bob the Builder". Jane McDonald was paid £500,000 a year to be a brand ambassador for RoyaleLife.

=== Bankruptcy ===
Contractors and bailiffs started requesting their payment at RoyaleLife's headquarters in Hampshire. Bull hired a security team for the office, but they stopped performing their services after they received no payment.

Fred Doe, who was alleged to have connections with the Kinahan Organised Crime Group during testimony given to the High Court of Justice in 2018, gave Bull a loan of £3 million with an interest rate of 100% per month in 2022. In May 2023, Fred filed a legal petition to place one of RoyaleLife's companies into insolvency. Bull's other creditors filed claims to protect their interests in response.

Judge Michael Giddins declared that Bull, who had £725 million in debts, was bankrupt on 1 December 2023. RoyaleLife collapsed with a debt of £1.5 billion. Bull's lawyers told his creditors that they could only received less than 0.5% of what they were owed. Bull's lawyers filed lawsuits against him due to unpaid legal fees.

Bull blamed Vladimir Putin for his financial difficulties as interest rates rose after the Russian invasion of Ukraine.

== Personal life ==
Bull was married twice and had two children. Bull received a hair transplant and gastric band surgery. He met Sara Nilsen, a Norwegian model, in 2021, and married her, but Nilsen now lives with her family in Norway.

Bull owned at least ten luxury vehicles. His £10 million Georgian architecture mansion had bowling alleys and six double garages, but was later seized and placed for sale online after his bankruptcy.

== Works cited ==
- Barr, Luke (14 August 2023). "'Bob the builder' tycoon's holiday parks tumble into administration". The Daily Telegraph. Archived from the original on 20 April 2025.
- Chellel, Kit; de Paoli, Lucca (12 June 2026). "The Bankrupting of a Mobile Home Billionaire". Bloomberg News.
- de Paoli, Lucca (1 December 2023). "Bungalow Tycoon Owing £725 Million Declared Bankrupt by Court". Bloomberg News.
- Gill, Oliver (2 March 2024). "From billionaire to bankrupt: Bob Bull vows to make a comeback". The Sunday Times. Archived from the original on 8 June 2024.
- Perez, Irene; de Paoli, Lucca (3 August 2023). "Alleged Gangster Sends Bungalow Billionaire Into Insolvency Spat". Bloomberg News.
- Scott, Caroline (28 May 2023). "The man who went from bankrupt to bungalow billionaire in seven years". The Sunday Times.
