= Motorhome stopover =

Overnight stopping area for recreational vehicles or motorhomes

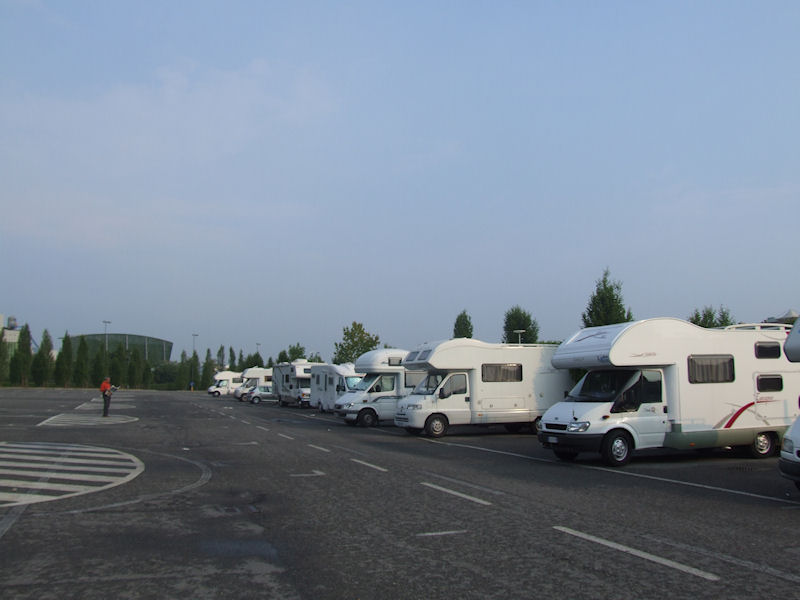
A motorhome stopover in Alba, Italy

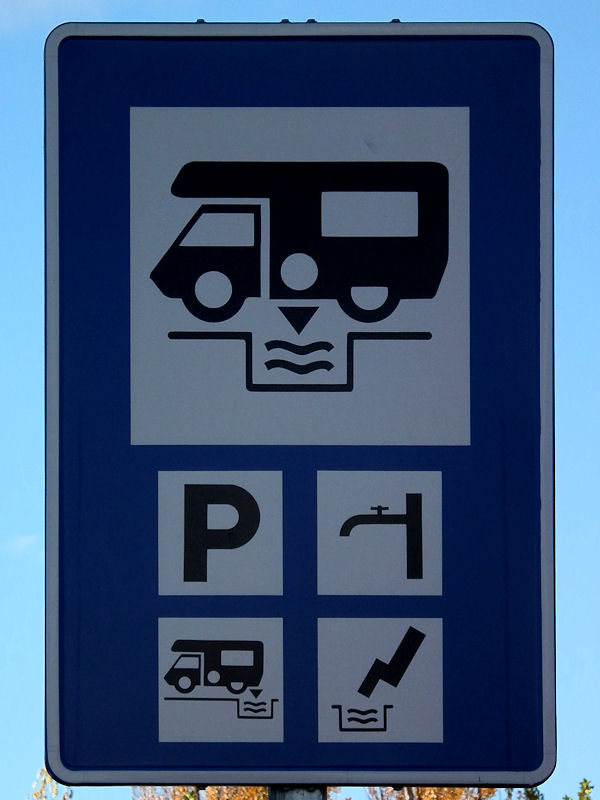
Sign indicating a motorhome stopover area with available services

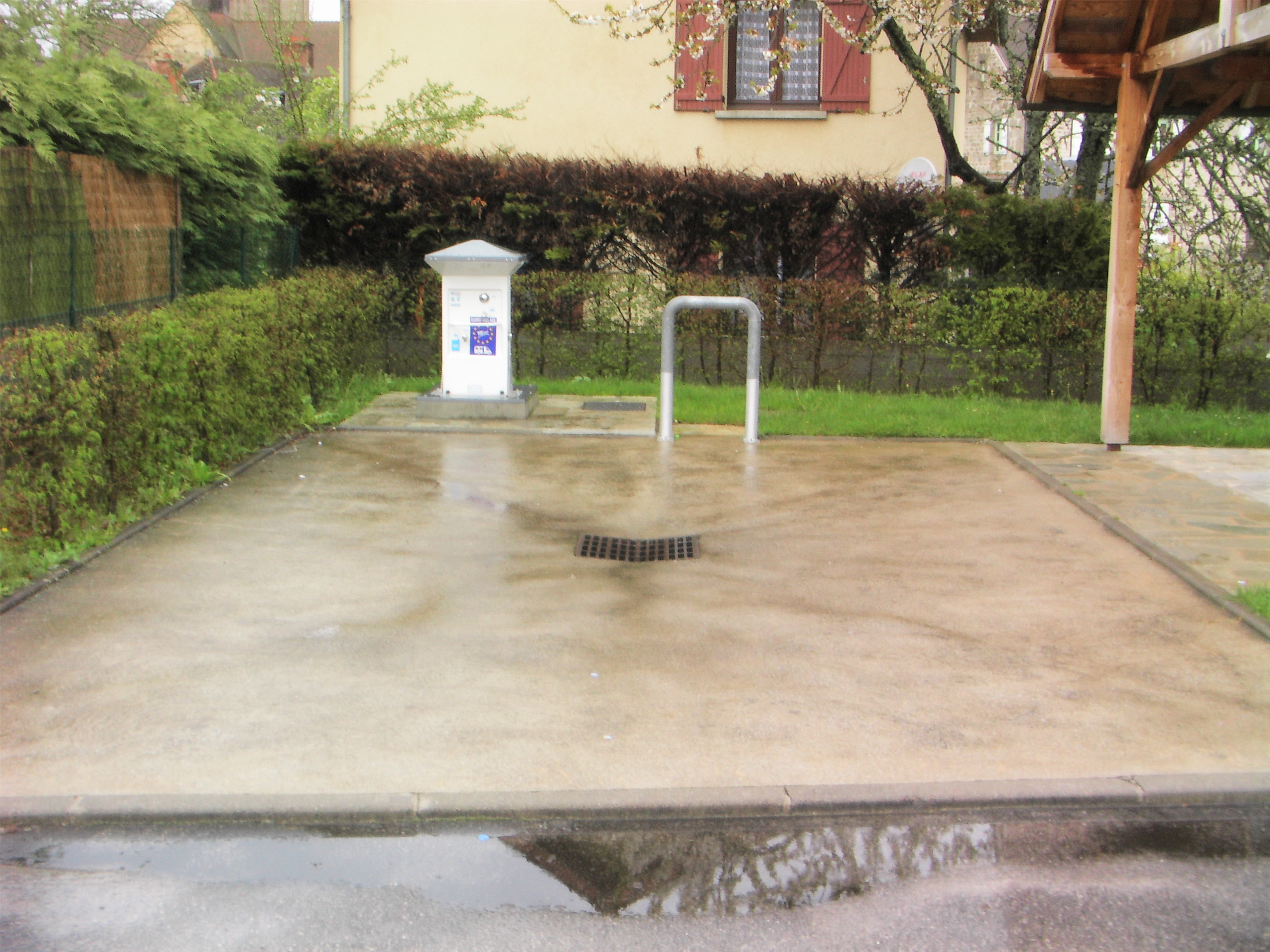
A typical area for motorhome in Felletin, France

A motorhome stopover (German: Reisemobil-Stellplatz, Italian: Aree di Sosta, French: Aire de Service) is a place designated for the purpose of overnight stopping for recreational vehicles or motorhomes. Motorhome stopovers are usually operated by local authorities. These vehicles can stay overnight or longer depending on terms and conditions specified on a sign by each locality. Parking is in accordance with local building codes and road traffic law.

There are three main purposes of these stopping places: providing a place for a short-term overnight stay without paperwork involved or restrictions of checking-in and checking-out time constraints imposed by formal campsites, allowing for travellers who prefer to move frequently from one place to the next during a short period of vacation and allowing parking places that are generally within walking distance to tourist sights.

These stopovers differ from campsites in that they are usually intended for a very short-term usage—usually one or two days—thus they provide very limited space for parking and limited facilities or at times no service at all. Some stopovers may provide services like campsites but these places generally will not provide much space around the vehicles as most campsites do. In most cases these places are usually located at the center of or at the edge of a town or a village and are convenient for visiting such places and generally do not have a management facility like a campsite. In addition, the majority of these place are free of charge, in particular those that belong to smaller localities. Where fees are applied, they are usually very nominal. Motorhome stopovers are a very popular mean of travelling in Germany, France and Italy but are gradually gaining more popularity in Spain and some other countries in Europe.

A formal motorhome stopover in Europe is usually indicated by a sign post. Locations of these stopovers vary depending on the locality. Some stopovers are part of a town's public parking, a part of the town sports facility, or next to a church—some with designated parking bays and some without. Others are specifically created for such purposes.

Countries like Germany permit the staying in a vehicle as long as the driver can resume driving when necessary. This rule applies to motorhome parking in public places as well. Therefore "camping-like behavior" such as setting out an awning or picnic table and chairs is not usually permitted in these motorhome stopovers.

== Services ==
Basic services may include:

- Drinking water
- Disposal facility for emptying chemical toilets
- Electrical hook up

A campsite-like motorhome stopover may provide more services than those indicated above.

== See also ==
- Motorhome
- RV park
