= RV park =

Place where people with recreational vehicles can stay

Map symbol used by the U.S. National Park Service to indicate an RV campground

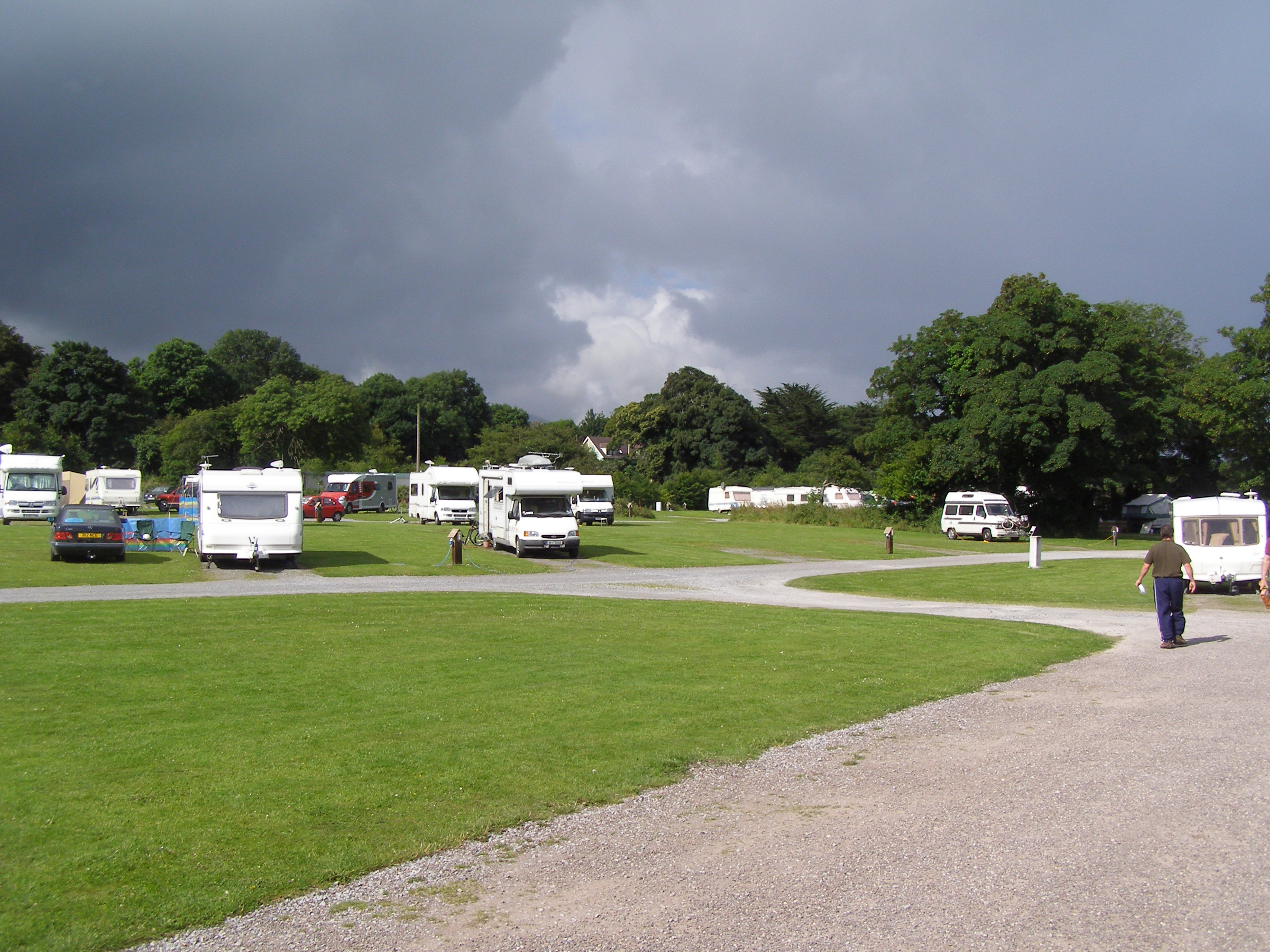
A European town campground in Tralee, Ireland

A recreational vehicle park (RV park) or caravan park is a place where people with recreational vehicles can stay overnight, or longer, in allotted spaces known as "sites" or "campsites". They are also referred to as campgrounds, though a true campground also provides facilities for tent camping; many facilities calling themselves "RV parks" also offer tent camping or cabins with limited facilities.

== Services ==
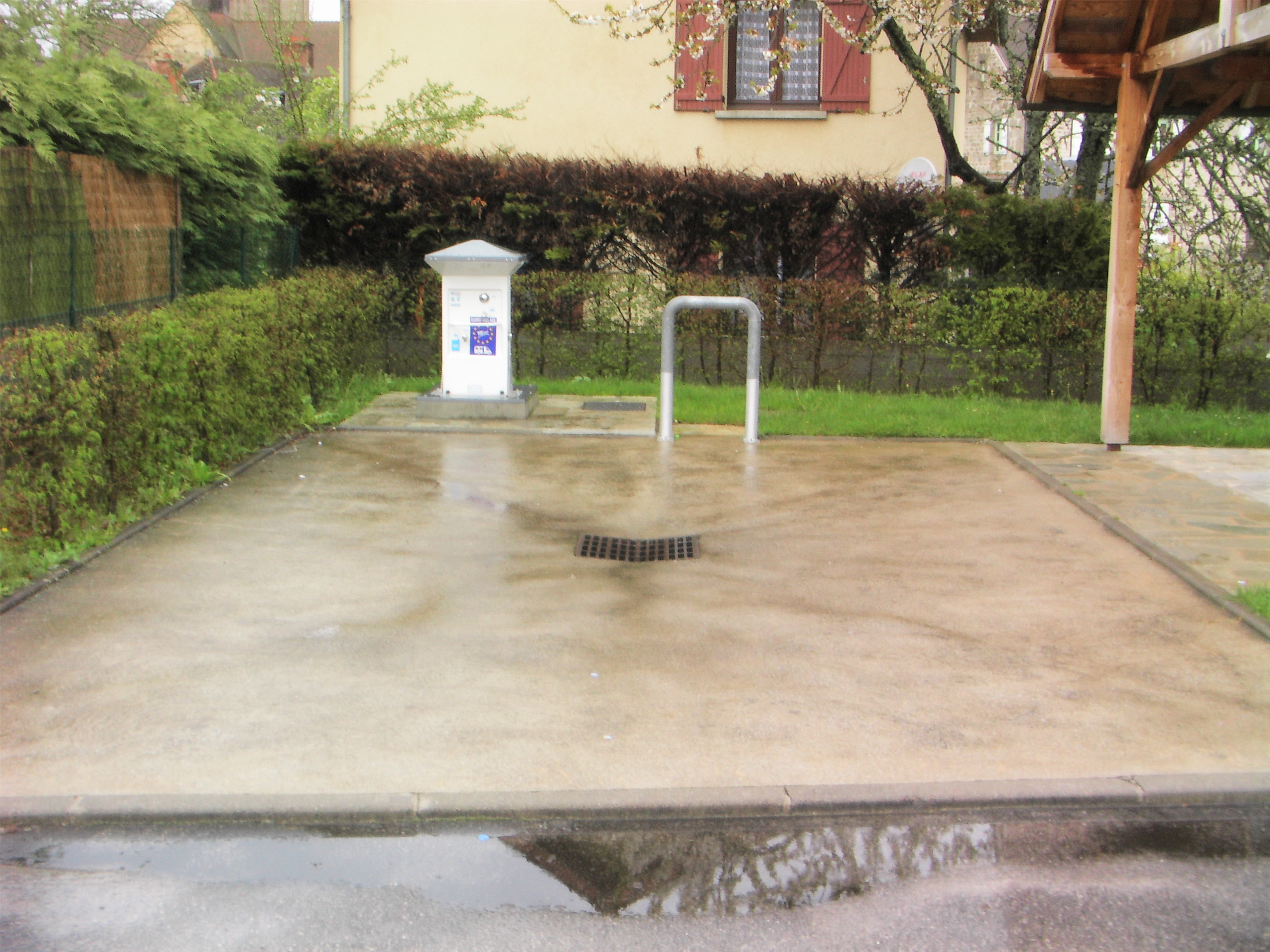
A typical area for motorhome in Felletin, France

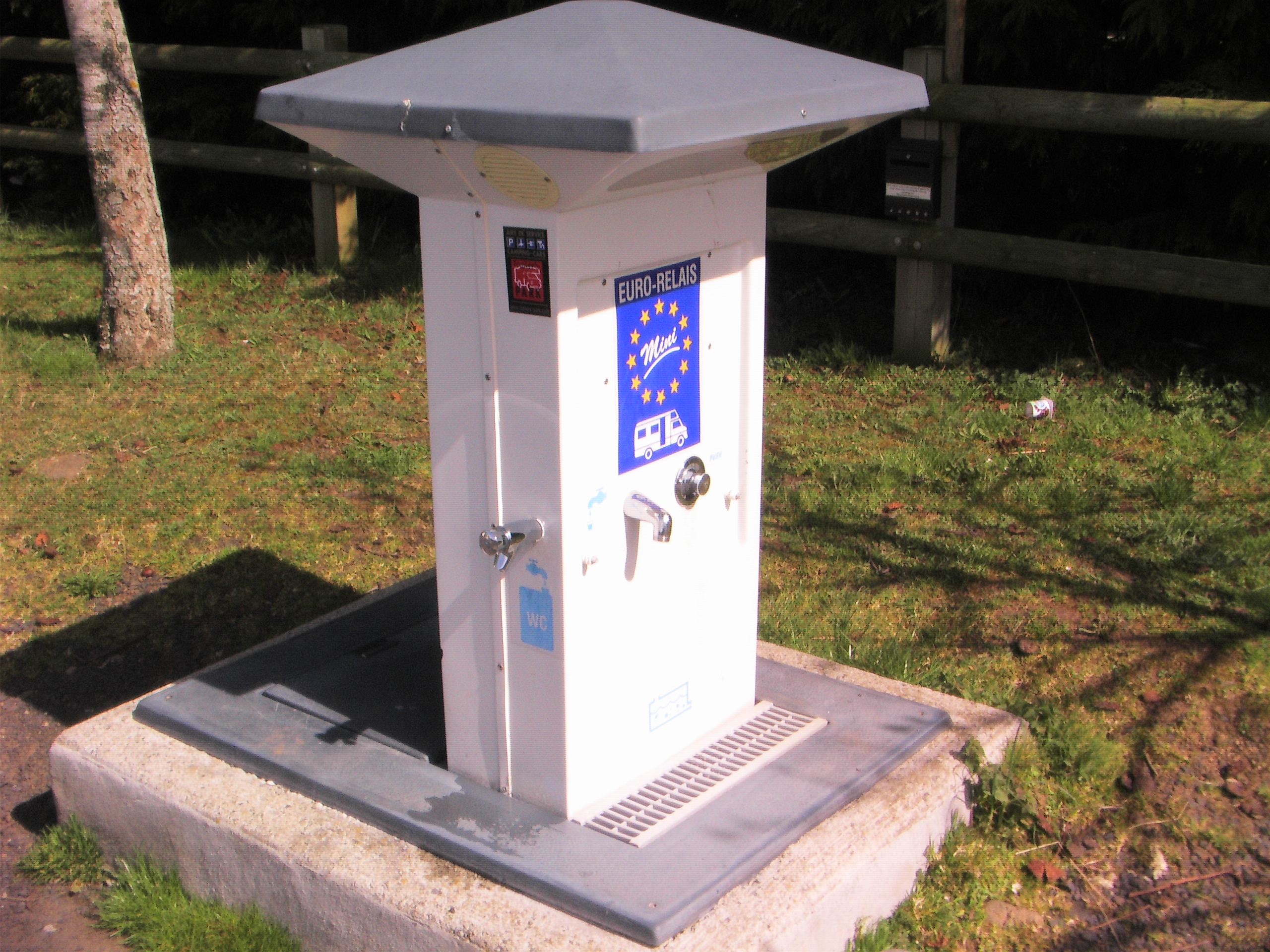
Point service of Valuejols, France

Allocated space (pitch/site) facilities may include:

- AC power connection. (Usually rated by capacity such as 15, 20, 30 or 50 amperes.)
- Drinking water connection
- Sewer connection
- Television connection (relevant to local area standards)
- Telephone connection (rare outside North America)
- Hotspot (Wi-Fi)

Park facilities may include:

- Barbecue area
- Bathhouses
- Convenience store
- Dump station
- Exercise equipment
- Gift shop
- Golf Courses
- Hot tubs
- Laundry
- Picnic tables
- Restrooms
- Recreation Hall
- Showers
- Swimming pool
- Bar/restaurant

Occasionally, electric vehicle owners will use the electrical facilities at RV parks to charge their cars - especially in rural areas where other charging facilities are unavailable. In North America, "50 amp" (NEMA 14-50) connections are especially desirable for EV charging. The "30 amp" (TT-30), "20 amp" (NEMA 5-20), and "15 amp" (NEMA 5-15) connections may also be used, but offer progressively slower charging speeds. Outside of North America, 16 amp (caravan mains sockets) are common.

== RV parks by region ==
=== Australia ===
In Australia there is generally no differentiation between an RV park and a trailer park. The term "caravan park" is used to refer to both. The term "holiday park" is becoming increasingly common, with many parks increasing their stock of on-site cabins, often accompanied by a reduction in the number of caravan sites, generally having higher quality facilities than the standard caravan park.

=== Europe ===
Caravan sites in Europe range in facilities depending on their age. Most new sites will be built to high environmentally friendly standards and have facilities compatible with the newest vehicles.

The Caravan Club has 1 million members in Europe with around 200 self-owned campsites and over 2,500 third party certificated locations, more commonly known as CL sites. The Camping and Caravanning Club is a non-profit organisation which has been running for over a century and has over 400,000 members and 100 campsites in the United Kingdom.

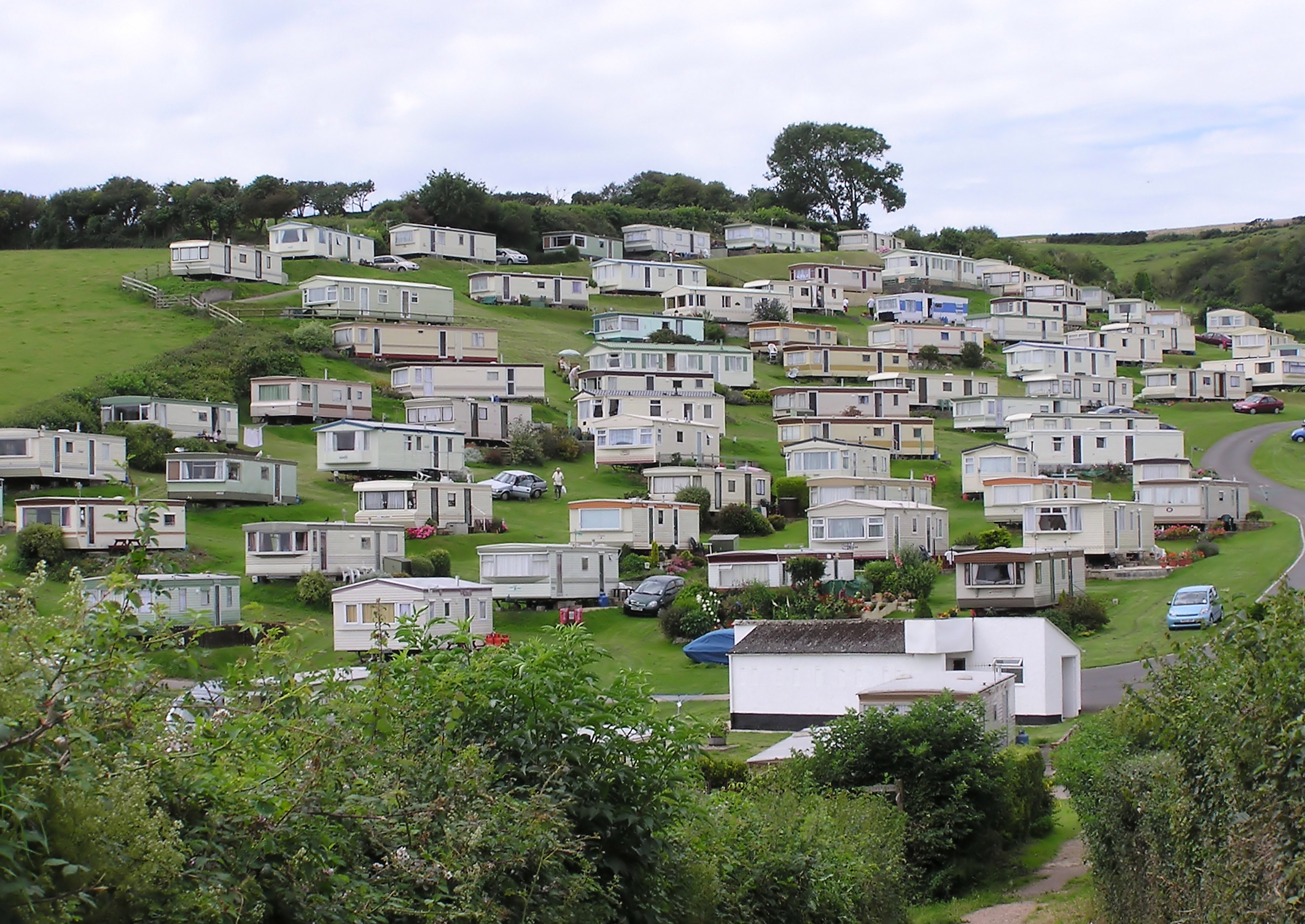
A caravan park on the cliffs above Beer, Devon, England. This caravan park is primarily made up of semi-movable static caravans.

In France, Germany and Italy, to a lesser degree also in Norway and the Netherlands, a large network of dedicated stopover sites for motorhomes has grown since about 1980. These sites are called Reisemobil-Stellplatz in German or Aire de Camping-car in French. While these sites can usually not be compared to North American RV sites regarding size and facilities, they still fulfill the same purpose.

Bob Bull, who operated the RV park company RoyaleLife, saw his net worth rise to around £1.9 billion before his company collapsed in 2023.

=== New Zealand ===
In New Zealand, motor camp, caravan park or holiday park are all terms typically used to describe overnight or long term vehicle-based camping. Along with powered sites for caravans, the parks usually offer tent sites and cabins, and a shared building with cooking facilities.

=== North America ===
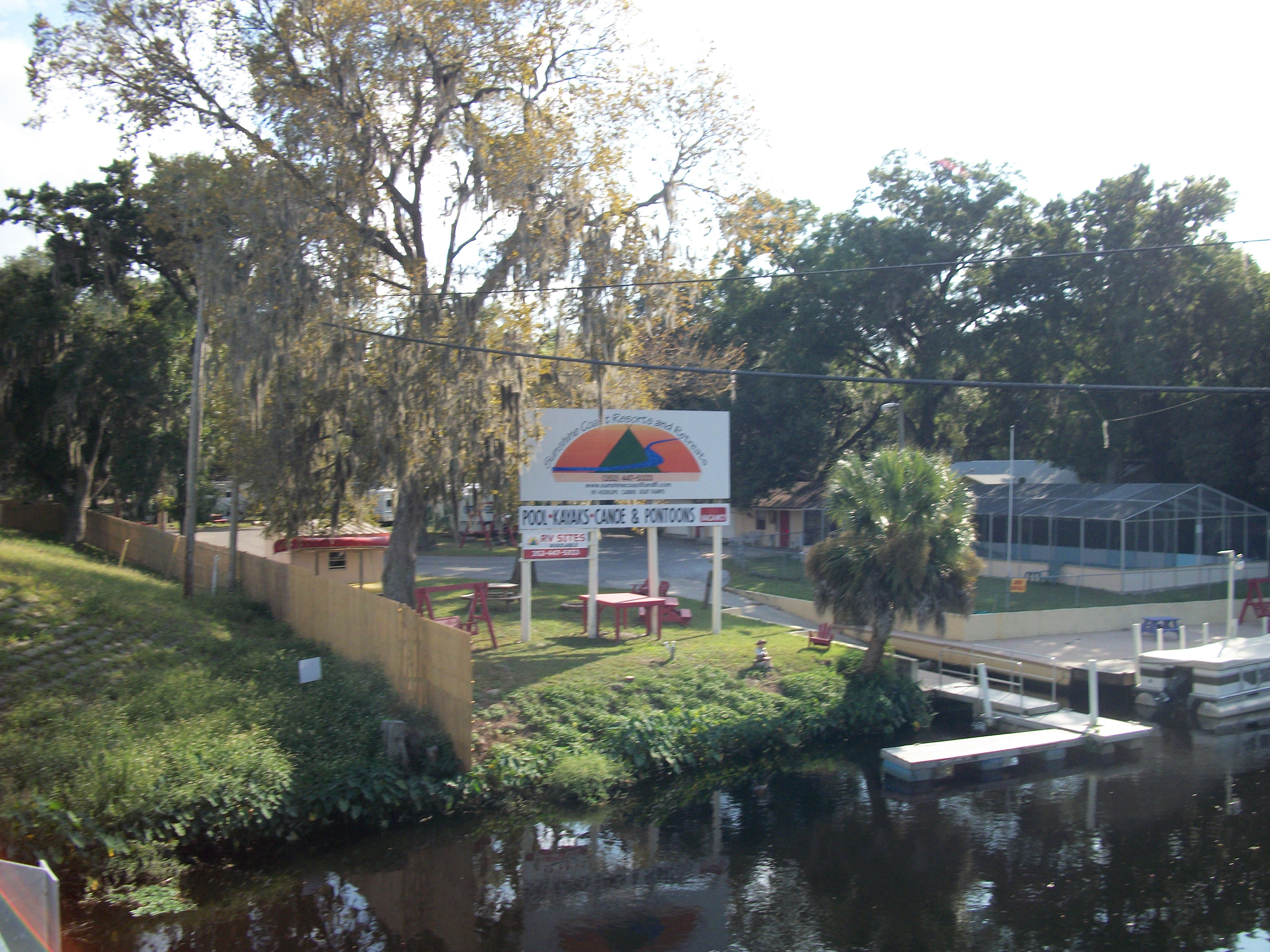
Trailer park and recreational boating resort on the Withlacoochee River at the foot of the bridge carrying Southbound US 19–98 in Florida

RV parks range from rustic facilities with no or limited utility hookups, as often found in state/provincial parks and national parks, to luxury resorts with amenities that rival fine hotels. Some high-end resorts restrict the type of RV that can stay to motorhomes of a certain length or longer, and/or newer than a certain year.

Most RV parks are open to allcomers and rent spaces on a nightly or weekly basis, much like a motel or hotel. A few parks operate on a time-share basis. Membership campground networks like Thousand Trails operate like clubs, with members paying an initial membership fee and annual dues. There are over 13,000 privately owned RV parks and over 1,600 state parks that cater to RVers in the USA. Many of these RV parks offer WiFi hotspot access on a daily, weekly, or monthly basis; occasionally, WiFi is included in the campsite fee.

Most RV parks are independent or operated by a government entity. In the United States, Kampgrounds of America (KOA), is the largest and best-known chain of RV parks, with Yogi Bear's Jellystone Park Camp Resorts a distant second. Good Sam Parks are mostly independently owned RV campgrounds endorsed by the Good Sam Club, a large association of US RVers that is operated for profit by the Affinity Group, Inc. Listings of RV parks can be found in printed directories; the best known are the annual ones by Woodall's and Trailer Life Magazine. Online and mobile app RV directories are provided by AmericaOnWheels.com, CampRate, Campendium, eCampGuide, MobileRVing.com, Reserve RV, RoverPass, RV Parks & Campgrounds, RVParkReviews, RVThereYet, The Dyrt and others. Overnight rates for most USA RV parks are US$15 to US$50, although some in cities and country parks may be US$10 or less; even free.

There is a subculture of "fulltiming" RV owners who live in their recreational vehicles on a permanent basis. They typically move from one RV park to another. The length of time that someone is allowed to stay in an RV park varies from park to park.

== See also ==
- Camping
- Membership campground
- Motorhome stopover
- Trailer park
