= Jane McDonald =

English singer, songwriter, and television presenter (born 1963)

- Jane McDonald in Blackpool, 2026
- Born: 4 April 1963 (age 63); Wakefield, England
- Occupations: Singer; songwriter; television presenter
- Years active: 1998–present
- Spouse: Henrik Brixen (m. 1998; div. 2003)
- Partner(s): Eddie Rothe (2008–2021; his death)
- Website: jane-mcdonald.com

Jane Ann McDonald (born 4 April 1963) is an English singer, songwriter, and television presenter. She first became known following her appearance on the BBC One show The Cruise in 1998. Later that year, her eponymous debut studio album topped the UK Albums Chart for three weeks and she has had five UK top 10 albums. Her eleventh studio album, Living the Dream, was released in March 2026.

McDonald has hosted or co-hosted daytime television shows including Loose Women and Star Treatment, with travel show Cruising with Jane McDonald winning a British Academy Television Award. She has also presented the travel shows Jane & Friends, Holidaying with Jane McDonald, Jane McDonald: My Yorkshire, Jane McDonald: Lost in Japan and Jane McDonald: From Pole to Pole.

== Early life ==
Jane Ann McDonald was born in Wakefield on 4 April 1963. She spent most of her life living with her mother, Jean, whom she regarded as her best friend; they shared a bungalow in Wakefield until Jean's death when McDonald was 45 years old.

== Career ==
After appearing on the series The Cruise in 1998, McDonald was signed by independent record label Focus Music International to make a covers album and a Christmas single. Her self-titled debut album spent three weeks at No. 1 on the UK Albums Chart, while the single "Cruise into Christmas" (a medley of Christmas classics) reached the top 10 of the UK singles chart. She then signed a recording contract with Universal Music TV, guest hosted the National Lottery, and appeared on Star for a Night.

Beginning in 2004, McDonald was a regular presenter on the daytime television show Loose Women. It was confirmed on 16 July 2010 that she would depart the show for at least a year to concentrate on her music career, with a planned tour of Australia and New Zealand. Although the tour never developed, she proceeded to tour the UK and returned to the series in 2012. She left permanently in January 2014. In 2017, she wrote and recorded the album Hold the Covers Back and continued to tour the UK.

In 2011, Wakefield Council awarded McDonald a star on its walk of fame.

In 2013, McDonald hosted the makeover show Star Treatment. In 2015, she played Grizabella in the musical Cats. She has become more widely known for hosting travel shows such as Cruising with Jane McDonald, Jane and Friends, Holidaying with Jane McDonald, Jane McDonald: My Yorkshire, and Jane McDonald: Lost in Japan. Cruising with Jane McDonald won the 2018 BAFTA Award for Best Feature, making it the first win for a Channel 5 show.

McDonald was paid £500,000 a year to be a brand ambassador for Bob Bull's RoyaleLife.

On 1 June 2023, McDonald was announced as Phillip Schofield's replacement as the host of the British Soap Awards. On 27 November 2023, she released the single "Believe in Christmas Eve"; it peaked at number 41 on the UK Singles Downloads Chart, becoming McDonald's second single to chart on a UK Singles chart.

On 17 November 2025, McDonald announced the release of her then-upcoming eleventh studio album, Living the Dream, and announced her 2026 UK Tour.

On 13 March 2026, McDonald released the single "Don't Mind If I Do" as the lead single from Living the Dream. Living the Dream was released on 20 March 2026, and debuted at number 10 on the UK Albums Chart, becoming her fifth UK Top 10 album; it also debuted at number one on the UK Independent Albums Chart.

== Personal life ==
In 1998, McDonald married Danish ship plumbing engineer Henrik Brixen, who later became her manager. They divorced in 2003. Brixen later admitted that he did not understand the music industry.

In 2008, McDonald reunited with The Searchers drummer Eddie Rothe, whom she had briefly dated in 1980 when she was 17 and he was 26. They became engaged on 24 December 2008, but never married. Rothe died of lung cancer at the age of 67 on 26 March 2021.

== Discography ==
=== Albums ===
Title	Details	Peak chart positions	Certifications
Title	Details	UK	Certifications
Jane McDonald	Released: 1 June 1998; Label: Focus Music International; Formats: Digital download, CD	1	BPI: Platinum
Inspiration (Note: Co-produced by Ted Carfrae and Jamel Badaoui.)	Released: 5 June 2000; Label: Universal Music TV; Formats: Digital download, CD	6	
Love at the Movies (Note: Co-produced by David Sandcastle.)	Released: 15 October 2001; Label: Universal Music TV; Formats: Digital download, CD	24	
You Belong to Me	Released: 24 January 2005; Label: DMG TV; Formats: Digital download, CD	21	
Jane	Released: 11 August 2008; Label: JMD; Formats: Digital download, CD	7	
The Singer of Your Song	Released: 14 September 2014; Label: JMD; Formats: Digital download, CD	—	
Hold the Covers Back	Released: 3 November 2017; Label: JMD; Formats: Digital download, CD	69	
Cruising with Jane McDonald	Released: 22 June 2018; Label: Channel 5 Broadcasting; Formats: Digital download, CD	6	
Cruising with Jane McDonald: Volume Two	Released: 28 October 2020; Label: Channel 5 Broadcasting; Formats: Digital download, CD	24	
Let the Light In	Released: 20 August 2021; Label: JMD; Formats: Digital download, CD	21	
With All My Love	Released: 6 December 2024; Label: JMD; Formats: Digital download, CD	—	
Living the Dream	Released: 20 March 2026; Label: Jeanie; Formats: Digital download, CD	10	

=== Compilation albums ===
Title	Details
The Collection	Released: April 2003; Formats: Digital download, CD
Because You Loved Me	Released: August 2007; Formats: Digital download, CD
Just for You (Note: Four-track CD available from concerts.)	Released: October 2010; Formats: Digital download, CD
Is It Love You're After (Note: Four-track CD available from concerts.)	Released: March 2014; Formats: Digital download, CD
Remixed	Released: September 2014; Formats: Digital download, CD

=== Live albums ===
Title	Details	Peak chart positions
Title	Details	UK
Live at the London Palladium (Note: Live recording of the DVD.)	Released: October 2010; Formats: Digital download, CD	31

=== Extended plays ===
Title	Details
From Me to You (limited edition)	Released: September 2006; Formats: Digital download, CD

=== Singles ===
Title	Year	Peak chart positions	Album
Title	Year	UK	Album
"Cruise into Christmas Medley"	1998	10	Non-album single
"You're My World"	1998	—	Jane McDonald
"Ain't No Mountain High Enough"	2000	—	Love at the Movies
"The Hand That Leads Me"	2001	—	Inspiration
"Winner"	2001	—	Inspiration
"Doctors Orders"	2008	—	Jane
"It's Getting Better"	2010	—	Non-album single
"The Singer of Your Song"	2014	—	Singer of Your Song
"Dance Yourself Dizzy (7th Heaven Mirrorball Radio Edit)"	2016	—	Non-album single
"You Still Lead Me"	2021	—	Let the Light In
"The Hand That Leads Me (Acoustic)"	2021	—	Let the Light In
"Let the Light In"	2021	—	Let the Light In
"You're My World (Piano Sessions)"	2021	—	Let the Light In
"Believe in Christmas Eve"	2023	— (Note: "Believe in Christmas Eve" did not enter the UK Singles Chart Top 100, but peaked at number 41 on the UK Singles Downloads Chart.)	Non-album single
"Don't Mind If I Do"	2026	—	Living the Dream
"Living the Dream"	2026	—	Living the Dream
"—" denotes a recording that did not chart or was not released in that territory.

=== DVDs ===
- Jane McDonald in Concert (1999)
- Jane McDonald Live in Las Vegas (2001) (available to view on YouTube)
- Being Jane (filmed 2005)
- The Very Best of Loose Women (2008)
- Late Night with the Loose Women (2009)
- Jane McDonald – Live at the London Palladium (18 October 2010)
- Jane McDonald – A Live Christmas Concert Special (15 November 2019) (No. 2 in the DVD music charts)

== Books ==
- Jane McDonald – Follow Your Dreams, autobiography (2000)
- Jane McDonald – Riding the Waves: My Story, autobiography, Virgin Books (2019)
- Jane McDonald – Let The Light In, Ebury Publishing (2024)
