= Camping =

Outdoor recreational activity

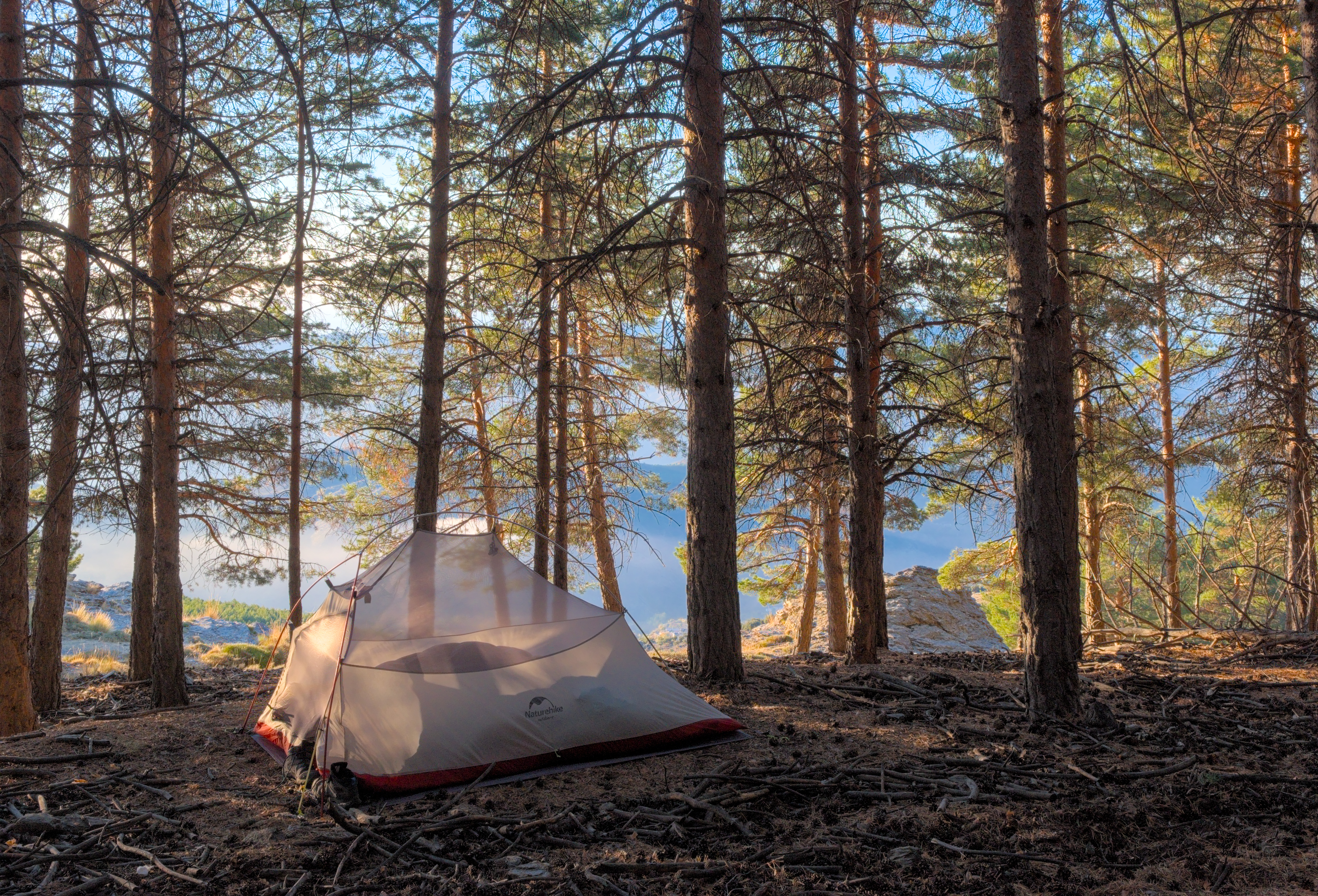
Tent camping in Sierra Nevada National Park

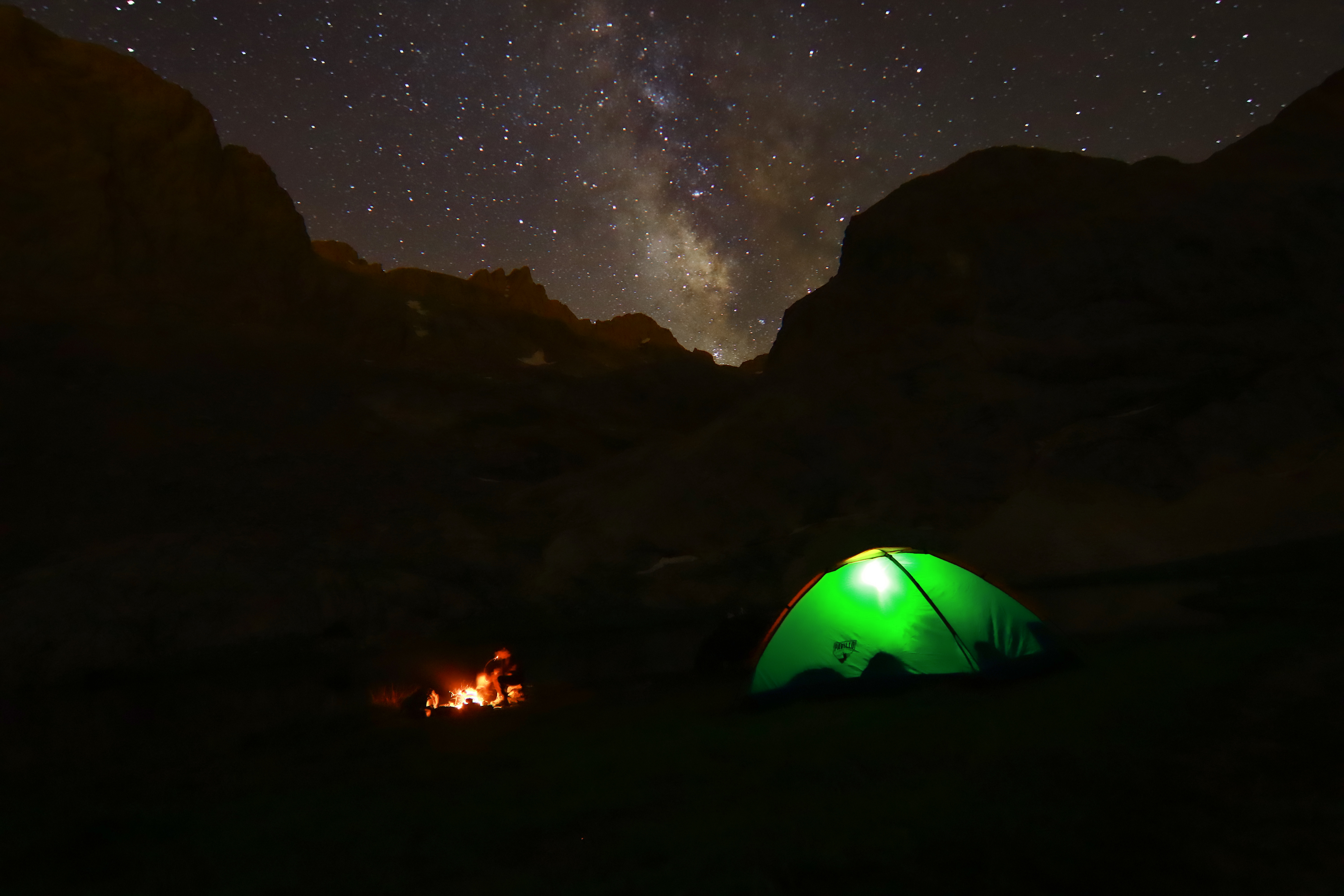
Tent camping in Turkey

Camping is a form of outdoor recreation or outdoor education involving overnight stays with a basic temporary shelter, such as a tent. Camping can also include a recreational vehicle, a sheltered cabin, a permanent tent, a bivy or tarp, a hammock, or no shelter at all. Typically, participants leave developed areas to spend time outdoors in pursuit of activities that provide enjoyment or educational experiences. Spending the night away from home distinguishes camping from day-tripping, picnicking, and other outdoor activities.

Camping as a recreational activity became popular among elites in the early 20th century. With time, it grew in popularity among other socioeconomic classes. Modern campers frequent publicly owned natural resources such as national and state parks, wilderness areas, and commercial campgrounds. In a few countries, including Sweden and Scotland, public camping is legal on privately held land as well. Camping is a key part of many youth organizations around the world, such as Scouting, which use it to teach both self-reliance and teamwork. School camping trips also have numerous benefits and can play an essential role in the personal growth and development of students.

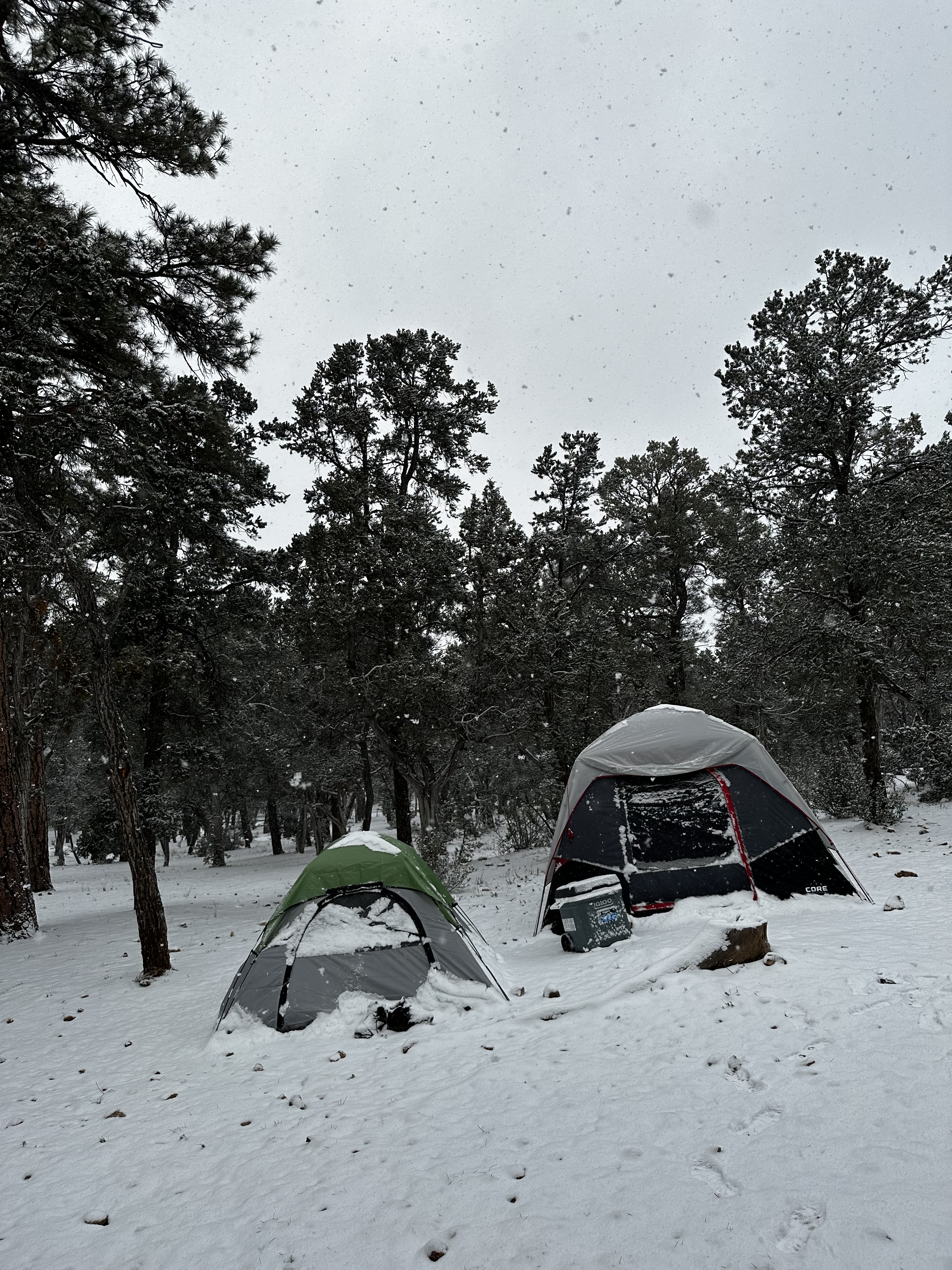
Tent camping, Arizona, Grand Canyon National Park, Camping ground, April 6

== Definition ==
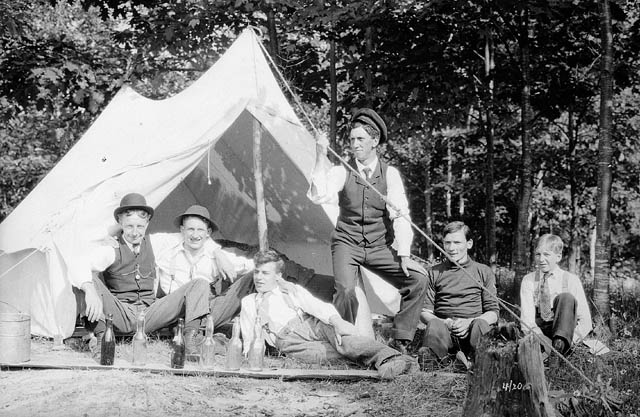
Camping in Ontario, c. 1907

The Cambridge Academic Content Dictionary defines camping as:

The act of staying and sleeping in an outside area for one or more days and nights, usually in a tent.

The Britannica Dictionary defines camping as:

The activity of sleeping outdoors in a tent usually for enjoyment.

Camping describes a range of activities and approaches to outdoor accommodation. Survivalist and wild campers typically set off with as little as possible to get by. Other campers might use specialized camping gear designed to provide comfort, including their own power and heat sources as well as camping furniture. Camping may be combined with hiking, as in backpacking, and is often enjoyed in conjunction with other outdoor activities such as canoeing, kayaking, climbing, fishing, and hunting. Fastpacking involves both running and camping.

There is no universally held definition of what is and what is not camping. Just as with motels, which serve both recreational and business guests, the same campground may serve recreational campers, school field trips, migrant workers, and the homeless at the same time. Fundamentally, it reflects a combination of intent and the nature of the activities involved. A children's summer camp with dining hall meals and bunkhouse accommodations may have "camp" in its name but fails to reflect the spirit and form of "camping" as it is broadly understood. Similarly, a homeless person's lifestyle may involve many common camping activities, such as sleeping out and preparing meals over a fire but fails to reflect the elective nature and pursuit of spirit rejuvenation that are an integral aspect of camping.

== History ==
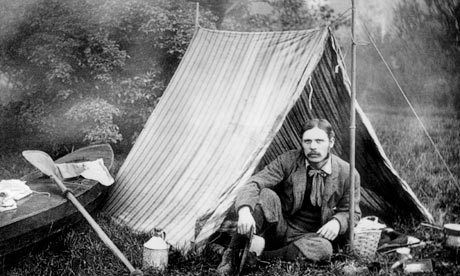
Thomas Hiram Holding outside his camping tent

The history of recreational camping is often traced back to Thomas Hiram Holding, a British traveling tailor, but it was first popularised in the UK on the River Thames. By the 1880s, large numbers of visitors took part in the pastime, which was connected to the late Victorian craze for pleasure boating. Although Holding is often seen as the father of modern camping in the UK, he was responsible for popularising a different type of camping in the early twentieth century. He experienced the activity in his youth when he spent much time traveling across the American prairies with his parents. Later he embarked on a cycling and camping tour with some friends across Ireland. His book on his Ireland experience, Cycle and Camp in Connemara led to the formation of the first camping group in 1901, the Association of Cycle Campers, later to become the Camping and Caravanning Club. He wrote The Camper's Handbook in 1908, so that he could share his enthusiasm for the great outdoors with the world.

Possibly the first commercial camping ground in the world was Cunningham's camp, near Douglas, Isle of Man, which opened in 1894. In 1906, the Association of Cycle Campers opened its first camping site in Weybridge. By that time, the organization had several hundred members. In 1910 the Association was merged into the National Camping Club. Although the First World War was responsible for a certain hiatus in camping activity, the association received a new lease of life after the war when Sir Robert Baden-Powell (founder of the Boy Scouts movement) became its president in 1919.

In the US, camping may be traced to William Henry Harrison Murray's 1869 publication of Camp-Life in the Adirondacks, resulting in a flood of visitors to the Adirondacks that summer.

During the early twentieth century, the popularity of camping in the United States grew as a result of the publicity created by The Vagabonds: Henry Ford, Thomas Edison, John Burroughs, and Harvey S. Firestone. This group of famous American businessmen, inventors, and authors traveled for ten years to different states, and the press highly documented their trips from across the country. Oftentimes, "...these rough and tumble pioneers would drive toward the Adirondacks and essentially live off the land, camping at farms and buying food along the way just like ordinary Americans out for a holiday on the road."

The International Federation of Camping Clubs (Fédération Internationale de Camping et de Caravanning) was founded in 1932, and national clubs from many countries affiliated with it. By the 1960s, camping had become an established family holiday standard, and today, campsites are widespread across Europe and North America.

== Types ==
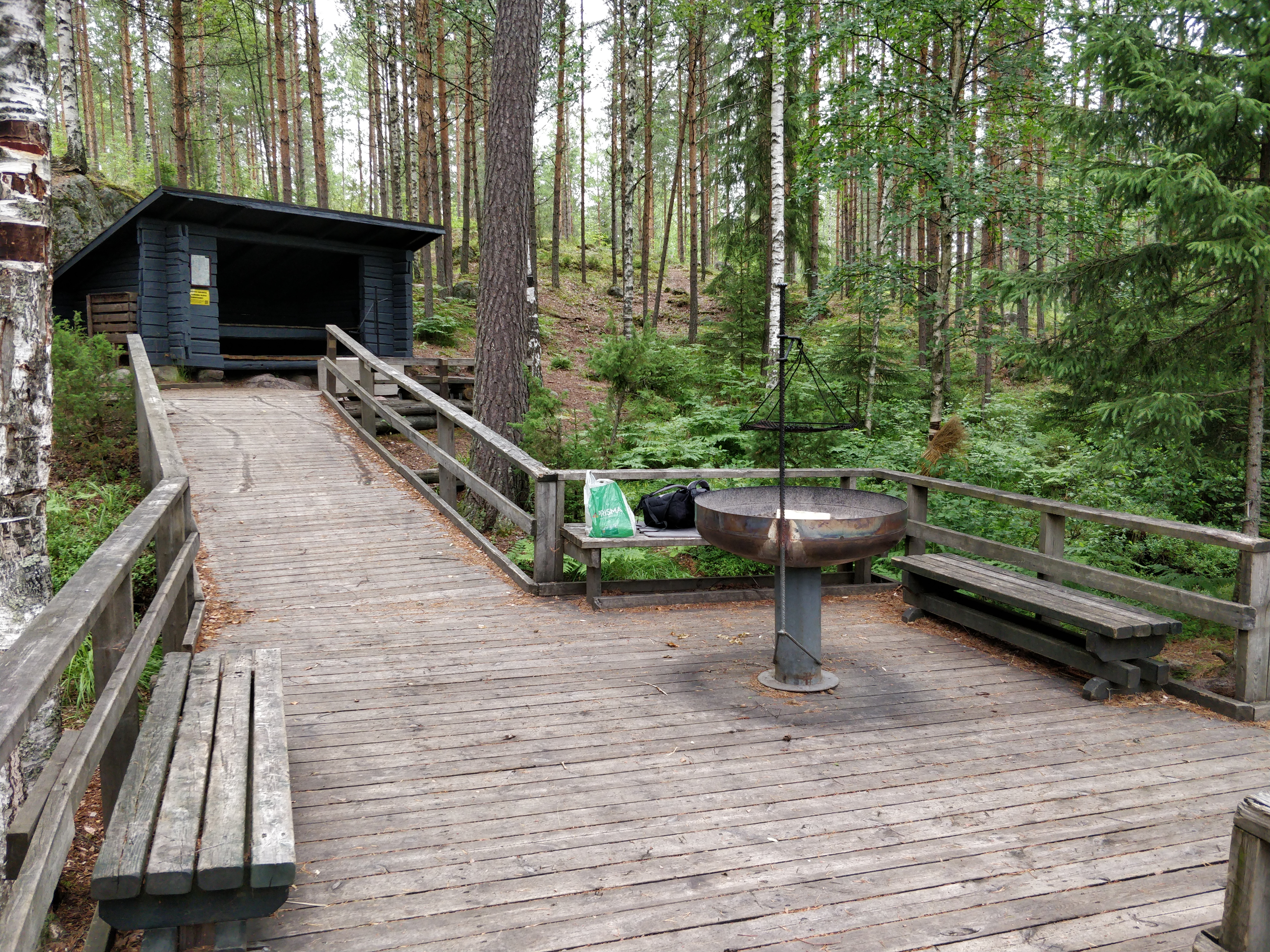
Seelammi lean-to in Lapakisto, Lahti, Finland

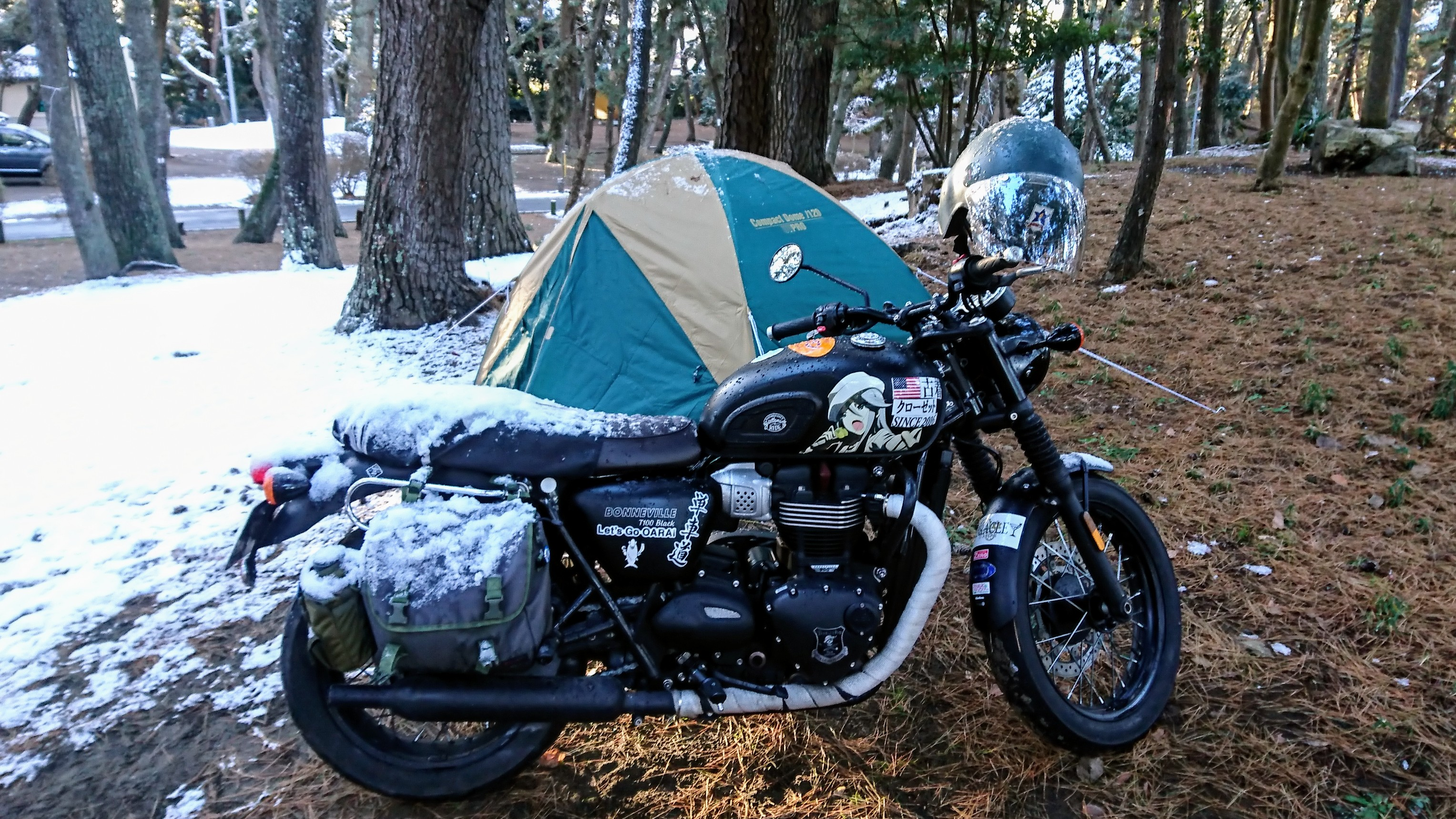
Car campsite in Ōarai Japan

Different types of camping may be named after their form of transportation, such as canoe camping, car camping, RVing, and backpacking, including ultralight backpacking.

Camping is also labeled by lifestyle. Glamping (glamorous camping) combines camping with the luxury and amenities of a home or hotel, and has its roots in the early 1900s European and American safaris in Africa. Workamping allows campers to trade their labor for discounts on campsite fees, campground utilities, and even some degree of pay. Migrant camps are formed not for recreation but as a temporary housing arrangement. Campgrounds for custom harvesters in the United States may include room to park combines and other large farm equipment. Camping is also popular at air shows, notably at the Oshkosh air show, where people often camp in small tents under their aircraft's wing.

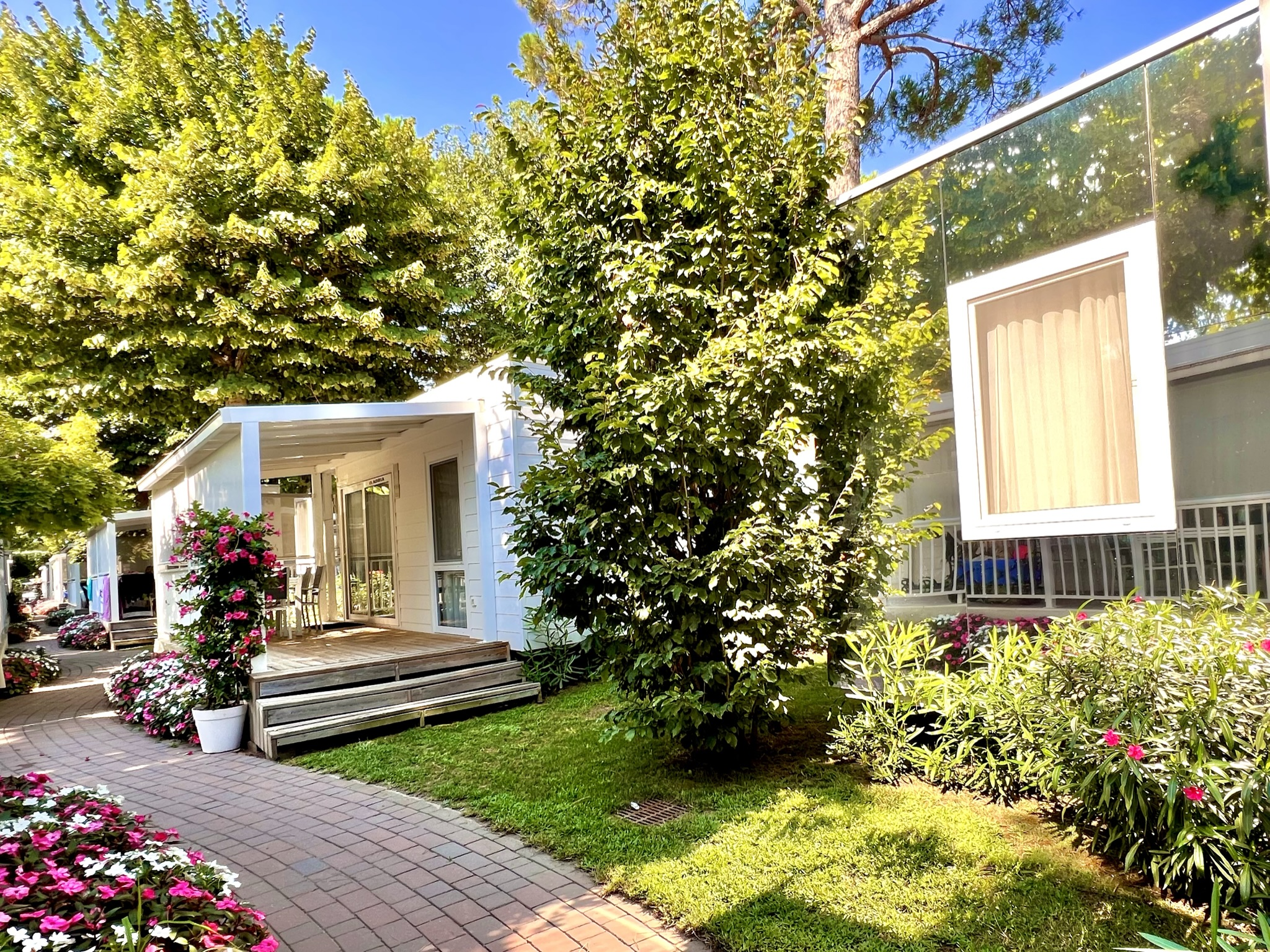
Luxury camping with mobile homes and verandas in Cavallino Treporti, Veneto, Italy

=== Religious camping ===
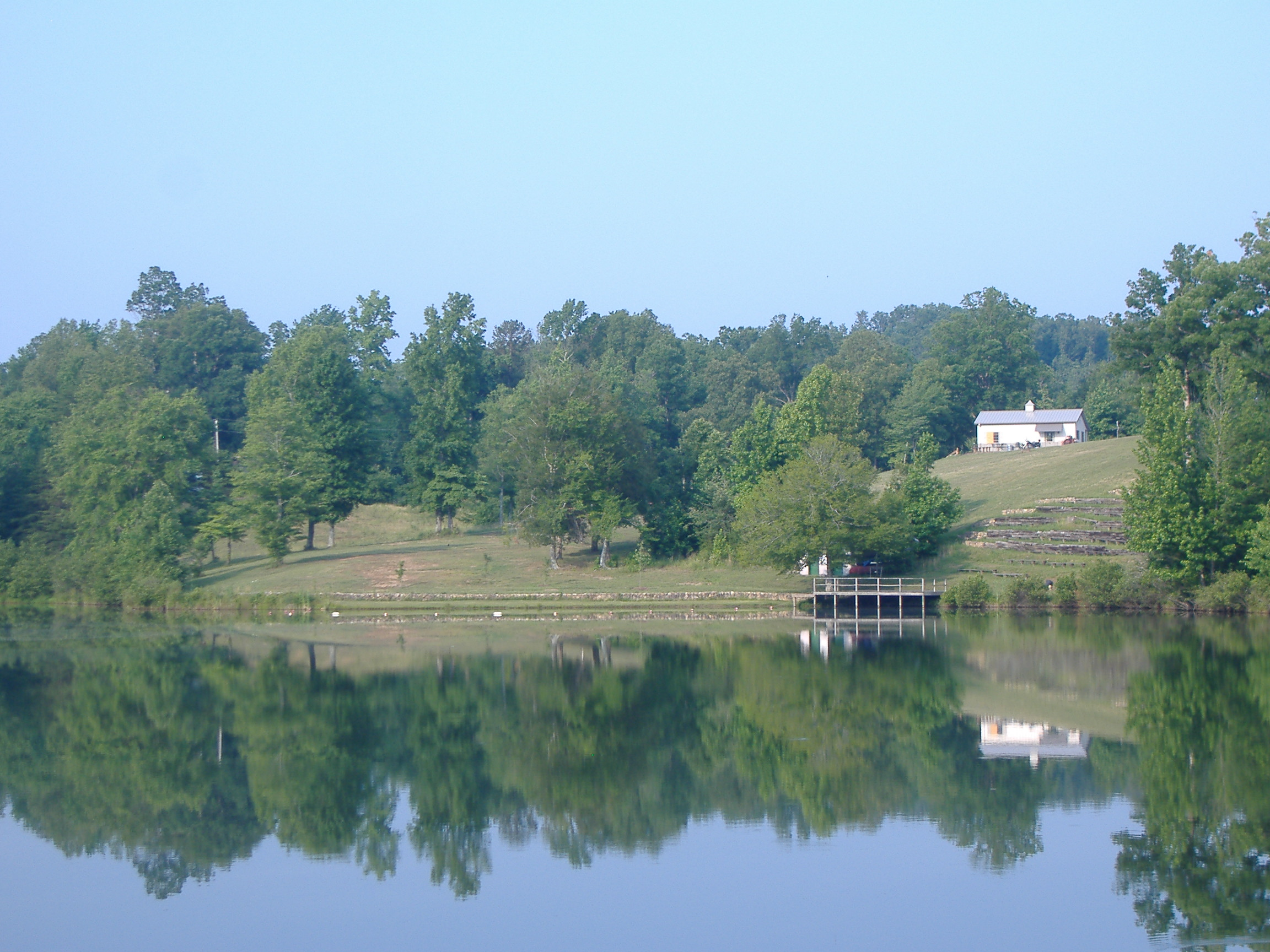
Camp Agape in Benton, Tennessee, United States.

In Evangelical Christianity, camping for a spiritual retreat was encouraged by the development of camp meetings in the 19th century to promote spiritual renewal far from the city, out in nature. These camps were an opportunity to pray, sing, and listen to sermons for several days.

Various evangelical associations have also established campgrounds or conference centers in isolated locations that provide retreat times for children and adults.

== Equipment ==
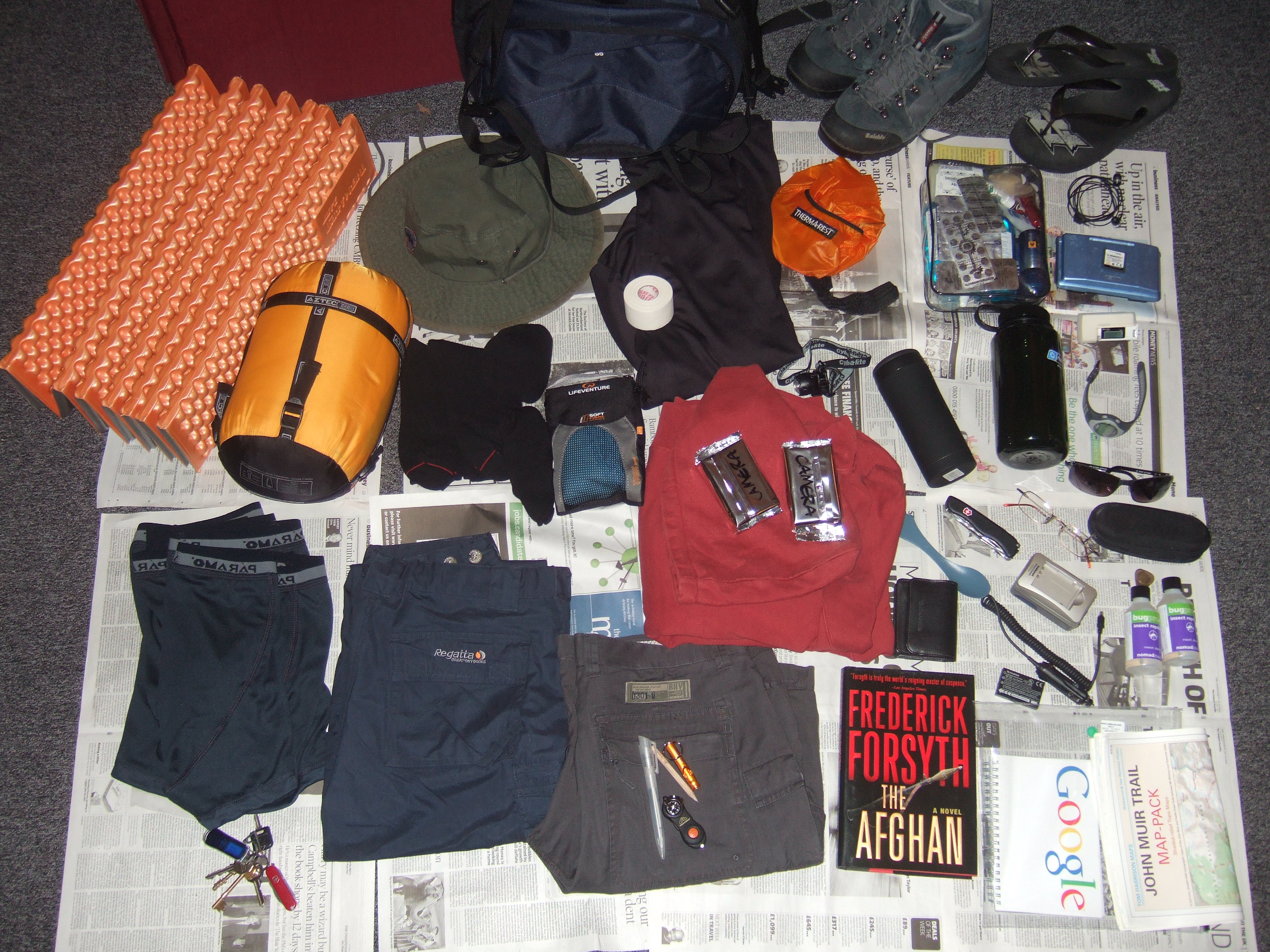
Camping equipment

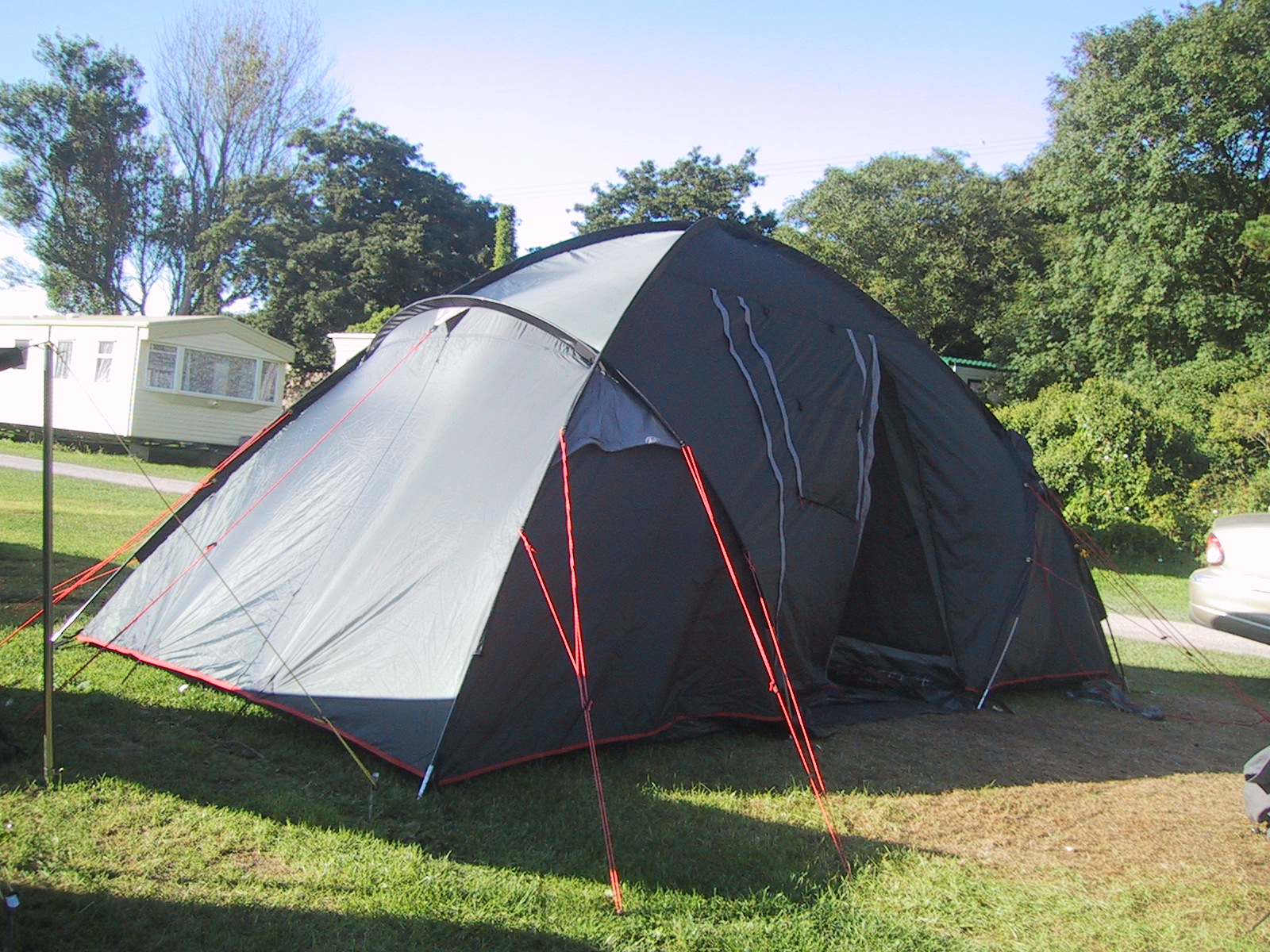
A dome tent

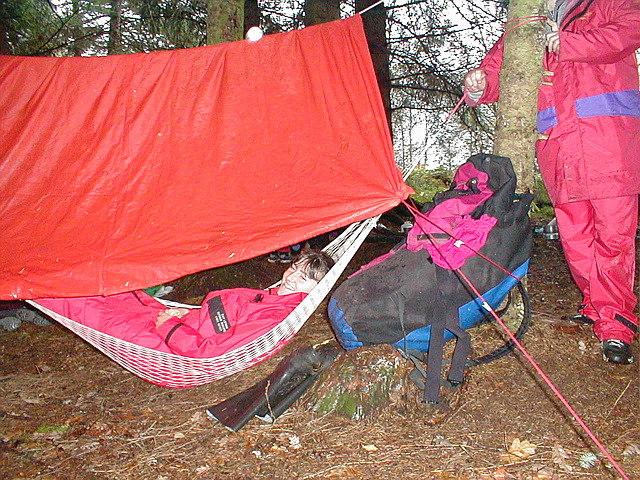
Shelter constructed from a tarp

The equipment used in camping varies by intended activity. For instance, in survival camping, the equipment consists of small items designed to help the camper with food procurement, heat generation, and safety. Equipment for this type of camping is typically lightweight and limited to essential items. Other types of camping, such as winter camping, require specialized tents or clothing designed to protect the camper from wind and cold temperatures.

=== List of common equipment ===
The following is a list of commonly used camping equipment:

- First aid kit
- Tent, lean-to, or other form of shelter
- Hammer or mallet to drive tent stakes into the soil (hammers are often a claw hammer, which is also helpful for removing them)
- Sleeping bag and/or blankets for warmth
- Sleeping pad or air mattress to be placed underneath the sleeping bag for cushioning from stones and twigs, as well as for insulation from the ground
- Lantern or flashlight
- Hatchet, axe or saw for cutting firewood for a campfire
- Fire starter for starting a campfire
- Camping chairs for placement around a campfire
- Ropes for stringing clothes line and for securing the shelter
- Tarp for adding a layer of storm protection to a tent, and to shelter dining areas
- Raincoat or poncho
- Hiking boots
- Fishing pole
- Canteen (bottle)
- Chuck box to hold camp kitchen items for food preparation, consumption, and cleanup
- Trash bags, for the handling of waste; see leave no trace
- Cathole trowel for sanitation in areas where a toilet is not provided
- Insect repellent
- Sunscreen for protecting skin
- rope for climbing or in case someone gets stuck
- Personal care products and towel
- Cooler to store perishables and beverages. If electricity is available, a thermoelectric or stirling engine cooler can be used without the need for ice. Campers at modern campgrounds will normally bring perishable foods in coolers while backcountry campers will bring non-perishable foods such as dried fruits, nuts, jerky, and MREs.
- Bottled water or portable water filter for areas that have access to rivers or lakes
- Cooking implements such as a tripod chained grill, Dutch oven, or La Cotta clay pot can be used for cooking on a campfire. A portable stove can be used where campfires are forbidden or impractical. If using a campground with electricity, an electric frying pan or slow cooker can be used.
- Firewood for campfires
- Emergency Preparedness Kit
- Multi-tool or knife
- Global Positioning System (GPS)

Much of the remaining camping equipment is commonly available in the home, including dishes, pots, and pans; however, many people choose to use gear better tailored for outdoor use. These amenities include heavy plastic tableware and salt and pepper shakers with tops that close to shelter them from rain. Alternatively, old kitchen gear purchased from thrift stores or garage sales can be used instead of standard household items to avoid buying expensive, specialized camping equipment. Backpackers use lightweight and portable equipment.

== Campgrounds and commercial campsites ==
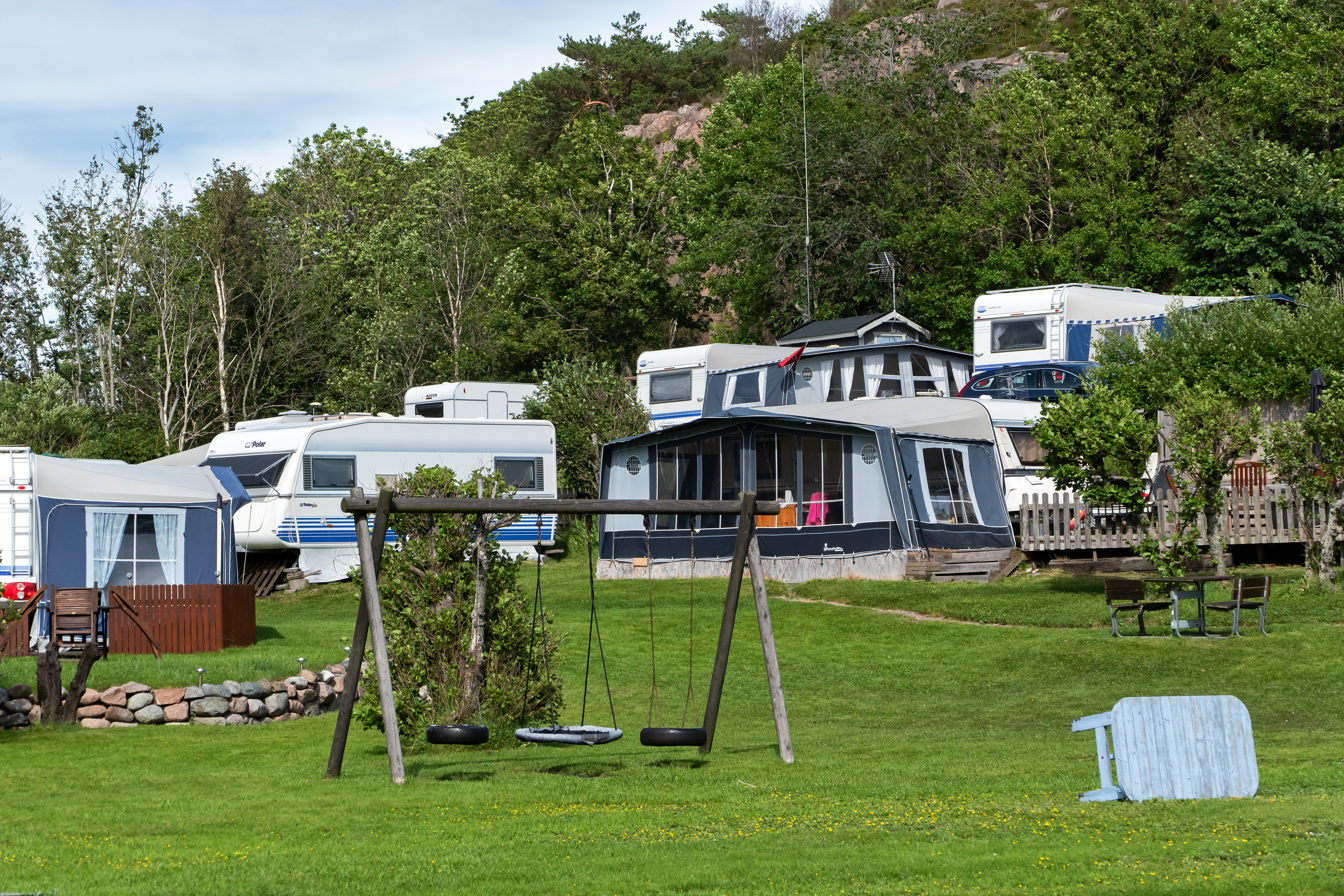
By the 1960s camping had become an established family holiday standard and today camp sites are ubiquitous across Europe and North America.

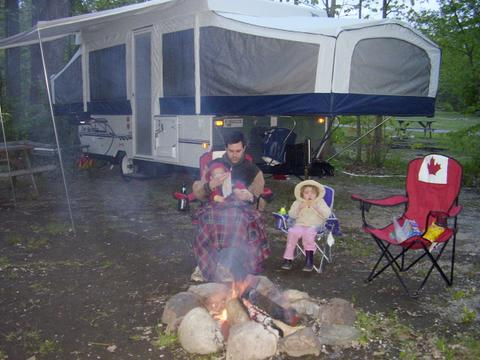
Tent trailer camping provides comfort in a towable package

Campers span a broad range of age, ability, and ruggedness, and campsites are designed in many ways as well. Many campgrounds have sites with facilities such as fire rings, barbecue grills, utilities, shared bathrooms, and laundry, as well as access to nearby recreational facilities, however, not all campsites have similar levels of development. Campsites can range from a patch of dirt to a level, paved pad with sewer and electricity with many public and private campgrounds also offering cabin options. (For more information on facilities, see the campsite and RV park articles.)

Other vehicles used for camping include motorcycles, touring bicycles, boats, canoes, pack animals, and even bush planes; although backpacking on foot is a popular alternative.

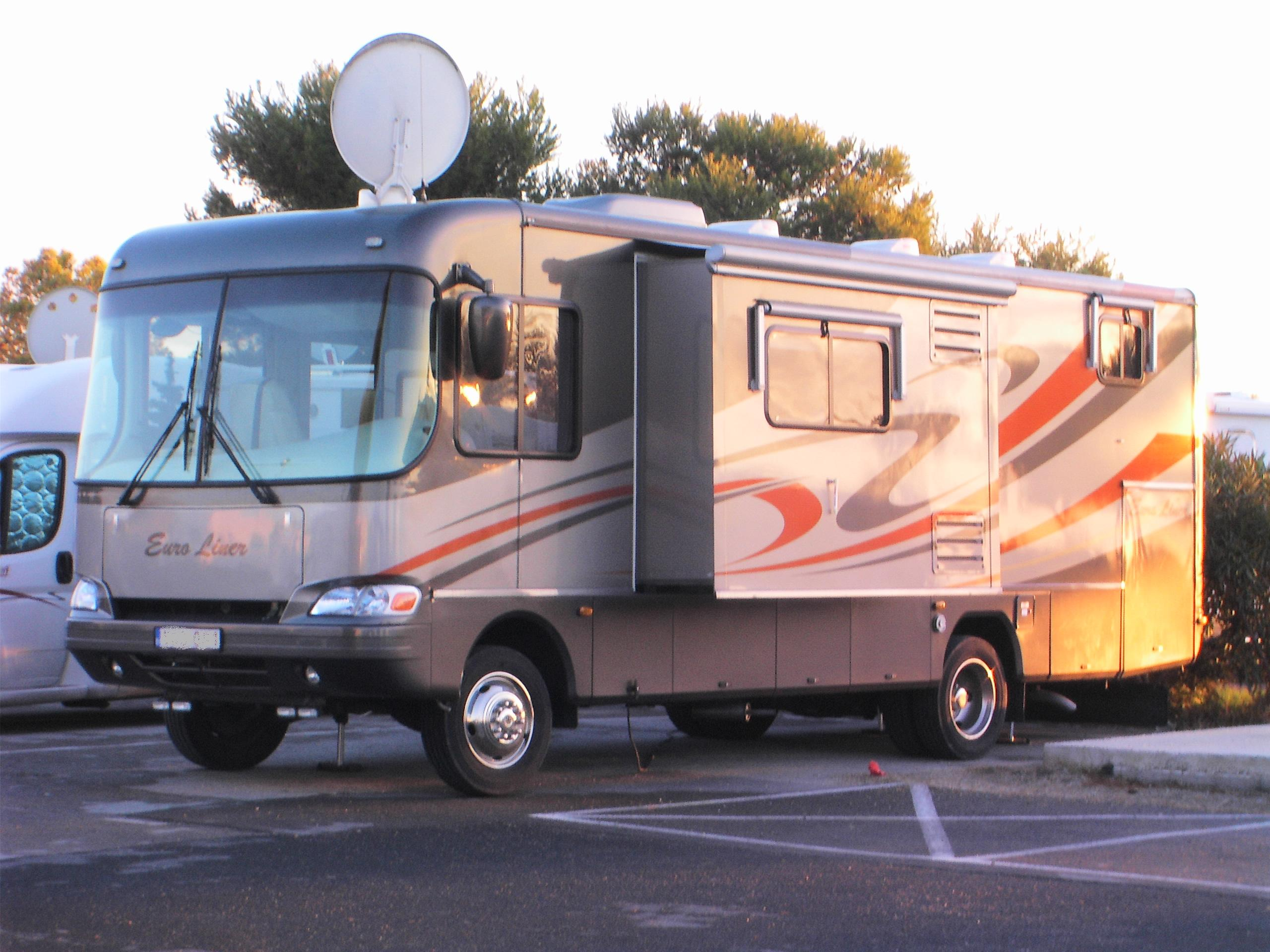
A large recreational vehicle provides many amenities when camping.

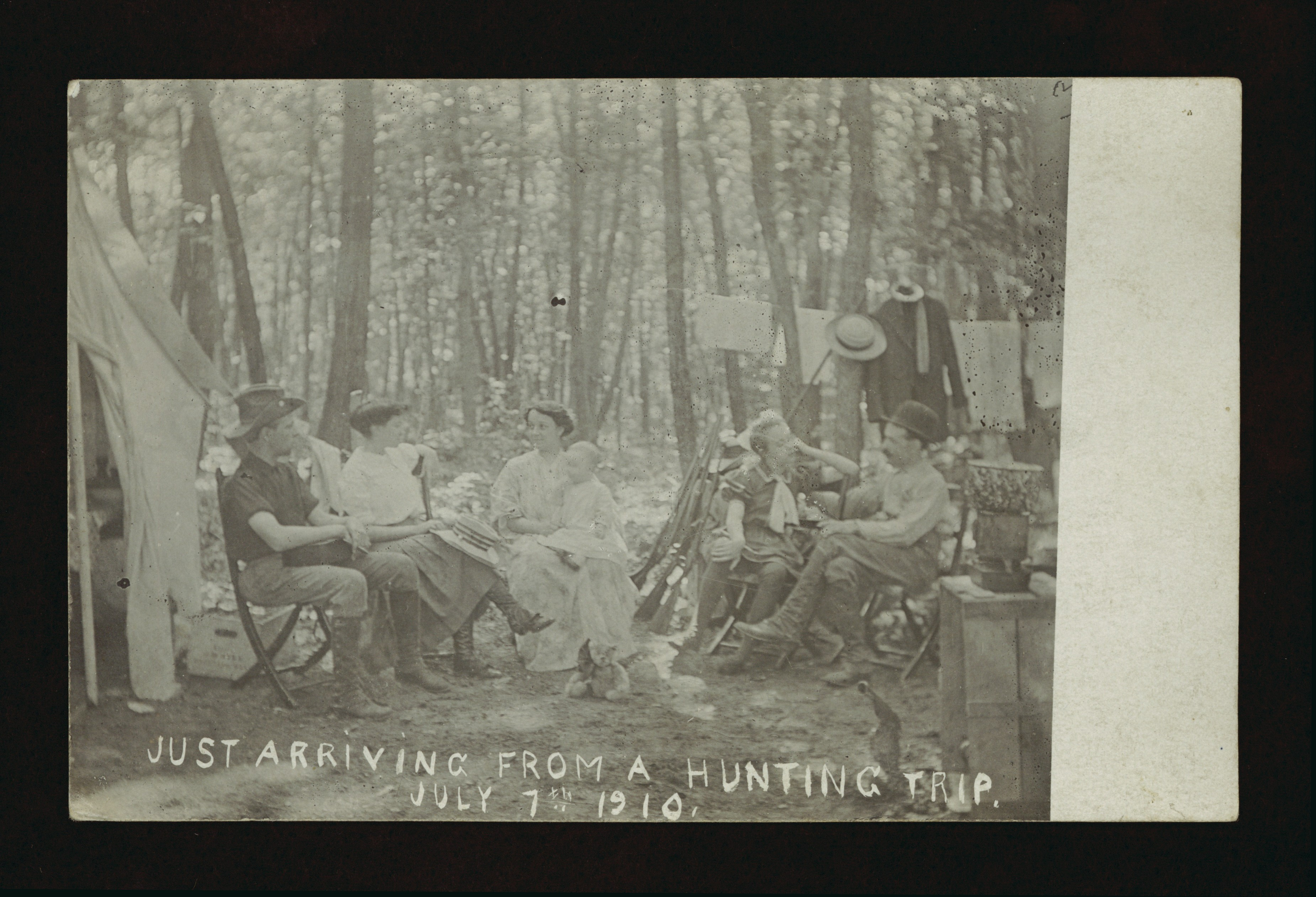
A group of men, women, and children sitting on the chairs in a camp in the forest. July 7th, 1910, Wainwright, Alberta.

Tent camping sites often cost less than campsites with full amenities, and most allow direct access by car. Some "walk-in" sites lie a short walk away from the nearest road but do not require full backpacking equipment. Those who seek a rugged experience in the outdoors prefer to camp with only tents, or with no shelter at all ("under the stars").

== Popularity ==
=== United States ===
According to an infographic produced by Red Rover Camping and based on data from the 2014 American Camper Report published by the Coleman Company, Inc. and the Outdoor Foundation, camping in the United States is gaining popularity after a fall of 4.2 million participants from 2011 to 2012.

=== United Kingdom ===
According to data provided by the Great British Tourism Survey conducted by Visit England, almost 4.5 million camping and caravanning holidays were taken by British residents during the first half of 2015, for an average of 3.7 nights. As in the United States, camping is gaining popularity, with an 8% increase in trips compared to the same period in 2014. The Caravan Club and the Camping and Caravanning Club represent UK campers.

Scotland allows wild camping on privately owned wilderness.

=== France ===
Data collected by the Fédération Nationale de l'Hôtellerie de Plein Air (FNHPA) shows that about 113 million overnight stays were recorded at French campsites in 2015, representing a 3.9% increase from 2014. French holidaymakers accounted for 77 million of these, and the rest consisted of foreign tourists, the majority of whom were of Dutch, German, and UK nationality. The French government aims to attract 100 million tourists annually by 2030. The most popular region for camping is Languedoc-Roussillon, with around 19.3 million overnight stays at campsites in 2015, while the Vendée department contained the highest number of individual campsites.

=== Canada ===
Canada experiences four seasons throughout the year. Advances in modern camping equipment make year-round camping possible across the country. At the end of the 19th century, Canada began establishing protected areas, which were later designated as National Parks. The parks now contain some of the most popular campgrounds in the country. But it was not always accessible to everyone; prior to the 1910s, camping in Canada was reserved only for men. The first campground established within a Canadian National Park opened in 1964 at Lake Louise.

A 2016 study by Camping Québec found that 20% of the population of Québec, about 1,600,000 people, participated in camping. The research also indicated that 8% of those campers were visitors from other countries. About 34% of campers in Québec use campgrounds within National Parks or Provincial Parks.

=== Australia ===
According to the Australian government, camping and caravanning hold a significant place in Australian culture, offering opportunities to connect with the country's natural landscapes and outdoor heritage. Australia benefits from a favorable climate and an expansive array of camping grounds and sites throughout the country.

Before the onset of COVID-19, there was a notable 67% increase in the number of caravan and camping trips over the preceding decade. In the year concluding in 2019, Australians embarked on a record-breaking 13.9 million caravan and camping journeys. Of these excursions, commercial caravan parks and camping grounds contributed to 52% of trips, 62% of nights spent, and 64% of total expenditure. Since the lifting of COVID-related restrictions, there has been a strong rebound in numbers. By the conclusion of the year in June 2022, trips had reached 12.7 million, while spending surged to an unprecedented $10.5 billion. With over 770,000 caravan and campervan registrations nationwide in 2021, this upward trend is poised to persist.

== Camping and public access ==
Camping on open land, regardless of ownership, is legal in a few countries, including Sweden and Scotland. In Sweden, a right of public access – allowing outdoor recreational activity on privately held wilderness – is enshrined in the constitution. Large groups, however, must obtain the landowner's permission. In Scotland, people may camp on most unenclosed land, whether state- or privately owned. There is however a "leave-no-trace" policy and a common-law outdoor-access code.

== In popular culture ==
Many films and other media have focused on camping or portrayed events regarding camping. Music includes the c. 1962 Phil Ochs album, Camp Favorites.

== See also ==
- Backpacking (hiking)
- Backpacking with animals
- Bell tent
- Bow drill
- Camping food
- Wild camping
- Firelighting
- Hammock camping
- Kitafahrten
- Outdoor cooking
- Overlanding
- Swag
- Tarp tent
- Wilderness-acquired diarrhea
