= The Bells (poem) =

Heavily onomatopoeic poem by Edgar Allan Poe

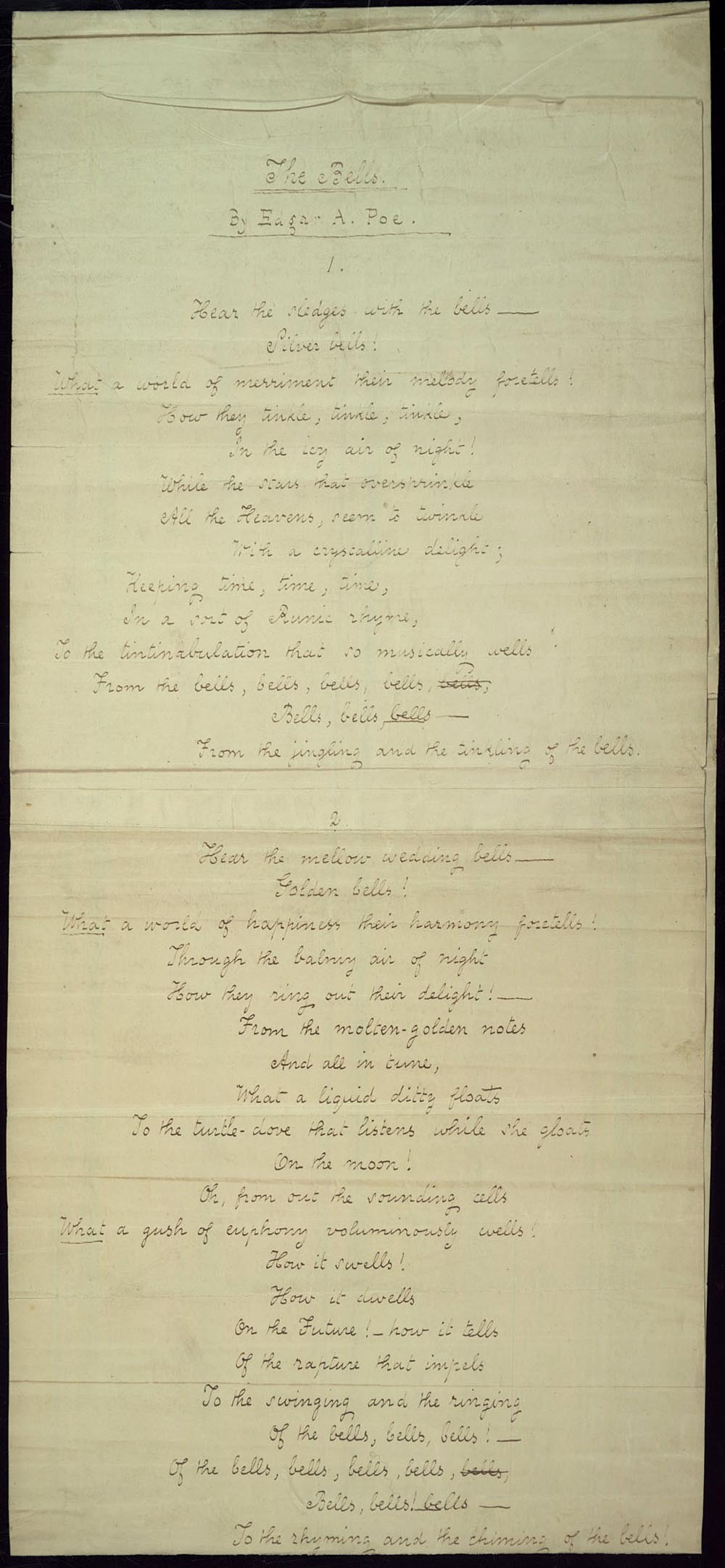
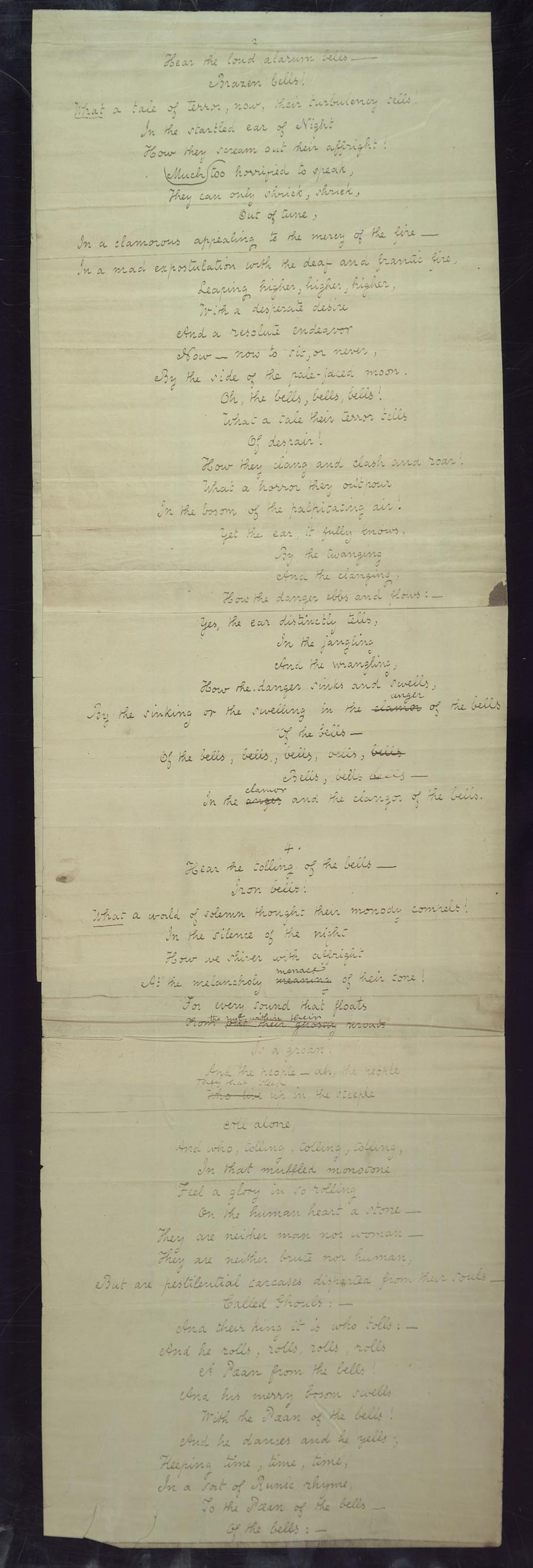
The original handwritten manuscript for "The Bells", 1848

"The Bells" is a heavily onomatopoeic poem by Edgar Allan Poe which was not published until after his death in 1849. It is perhaps best known for the diacopic use of the word "bells". The poem has four parts to it; each part becomes darker and darker as the poem progresses from "the jingling and the tinkling" of the bells in part 1 to the "moaning and the groaning" of the bells in part 4.

== Publication history ==
Poe is believed to have written "The Bells" in May 1848 and submitted it three times to Sartain's Union Magazine, a magazine co-owned by his friend John Sartain, until it was finally accepted. He was paid fifteen dollars for his work, though it was not published until after his death in the November 1849 issue. It was also published in Horace Greeley's the New York Daily Tribune newspaper on the front page of its October 17, 1849 issue as "Poe's Last Poem".

Inspiration for the poem is often granted to Marie Louise Shew, a woman who had helped care for Poe's wife Virginia as she lay dying. One day, as Shew was visiting Poe at his cottage in Fordham, New York, Poe needed to write a poem but had no inspiration. Shew allegedly heard ringing bells from afar and playfully suggested to start there, possibly even writing the first line of each stanza. The bells of which he writes are thought to be those he heard from Fordham University church's bell tower, since Poe resided in the same neighborhood as that university. He also frequently strolled about Fordham's campus conversing with both the students and the Jesuits.

== Analysis ==
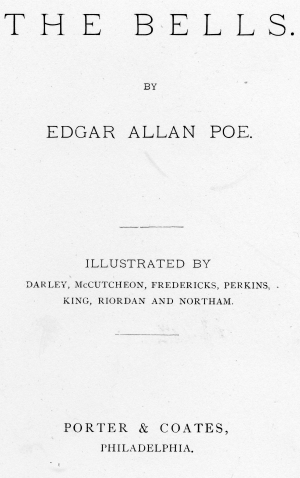
Title page for publication of "The Bells" circa 1881

This poem can be interpreted in many different ways, the most basic of which is simply a reflection of the sounds that bells can make, and the emotions evoked from that sound. For example, "From the bells bells bells bells/Bells bells bells!" brings to mind the clamoring of myriad church bells. Several deeper interpretations exist as well. One is that the poem is a representation of life from the nimbleness of youth to the pain of age. Growing despair is emphasized alongside the growing frenzy in the tone of the poem.

The sounds of the verses, specifically the repetitive "bells, bells, bells, bells, bells, bells, bells", lie on a narrow line between sense and nonsense, causing a feeling of instability. Poe uses – and popularized – the word "tintinnabulation", often wrongly thought to be his own coinage, based on the Latin word for "bell", tintinnabulum. The series of "bells" echo the imagined sounds of the various bells, from the silver bells following the klip-klop of the horses, to the "dong, ding-dong" of the swinging golden and iron bells, to screeching "whee-aaah" of the brazen bells. The series are always four, followed by three, always beginning and ending on a stressed syllable. The meter changes to iambic in the lines with repeated "bells", bringing the reader into their rhythm. Most of the poem is a more hurried trochaic tetrameter.

== Critical response ==
Richard Wilbur characterized "The Bells" as "altogether a tour de force". Critics have analyzed the musical or sound of the poem as opposed to its literary meaning. A. E. DuBois in "The Jazz Bells of Poe" places the emphasis on the musical quality of the poem which presages jazz and 20th century musical idioms. DuBois sees the poem as a dramatic song that is a precursor for Vachel Lindsay. DuBois makes comparisons to jazz music and places the poem in the style of musical and poetic "primativism" which was ahead of its time in the 1840s.

F. O. Matthiessen rejected the repetitive sounds employed and musical tone as "a case of onomatopoeia pushed to a point where it would hardly be possible or desirable to go again". Poe biographer Jeffrey Meyers noted that "The Bells" is often criticized for sounding mechanical and forced. Edward H. Davidson, however, praised its use of repetitive sounds: "It has been rightly praised for its experimental and effective onomatopoeia; its theme is probably nothing more profound than the four ages of man".

== Adaptations ==
Sergei Rachmaninoff composed a choral symphony The Bells, Op. 35, based on a Russian adaptation of the poem by Konstantin Balmont. The symphony follows classical sonata form: first movement, slow movement, scherzo, and finale, thus honoring the poem's four sections. (The work is sometimes performed in English, using not Poe's original, but a translation of Balmont's adaptation by Fanny S. Copeland.)

The Scottish composer Hugh S. Roberton published "Hear the Tolling of the Bells" (1909), "The Sledge Bells" (1909), and "Hear the Sledges with the Bells" (1919) based on Poe's poem.

Josef Holbrooke composed his "The Bells, Prelude, Op. 50" on Poe's poem, which was first performed in 1906.

American folksinger Phil Ochs composed a tune to the poem recorded on his 1964 album All the News That's Fit to Sing.

Eric Woolfson, musical partner to Alan Parsons in the Alan Parsons Project, has written two albums based on the writings of Poe. His second, Poe: More Tales of Mystery and Imagination, includes a song entitled "The Bells", for which he set Poe's words to music. This album was also the basis for a musical stage production that was performed in England, Austria, and other European countries.

In 1993 Danish composer Poul Ruders wrote a piece "The Bells" for high soprano and ten instruments, using Poe's text in its entirety although in Dutch. The piece was premiered in London, and has appeared on a CD from Bridge Records, New York.

MC Lars, a nerdcore hip hop musician, sang a complete version of the poem on his 2012 Edgar Allan Poe EP titled "(Rock) The Bells".
