= All the News That's Fit to Sing =

Studio album by Phil Ochs
- Released: 1964
- Recorded: 1964
- Genre: Folk
- Length: 42:46
- Label: Elektra
- Producer: Jac Holzman and Paul A. Rothchild

Phil Ochs chronology
Camp Favorites (1963)	All the News That's Fit to Sing (1964)	I Ain't Marching Anymore (1965)

Professional ratings
Review scores
Source	Rating
Allmusic	3/5 stars

All the News That's Fit to Sing was Phil Ochs's first official album. Recorded in 1964 for Elektra Records, it was full of many elements that would come back throughout his career. It was the album that defined his "singing journalist" phase, strewn with songs whose roots were allegedly pulled from Newsweek magazine.

Among these stories was that of William Worthy, an American journalist who traveled to Cuba in spite of an embargo on the country who was forbidden to return to the United States. Civil rights figures Medgar Evers and Emmett Till were lionized in "Too Many Martyrs" (alternatively known as "The Ballad of Medgar Evers".) Two talking blues jabbed sarcastically at Vietnam and the Cuban Missile Crisis. Even a poem by Edgar Allan Poe, "The Bells", was set to music. "The Thresher" was an ode to the sinking of the nuclear-powered American submarine USS Thresher: "And she'll always run silent/And she'll always run deep." The song "Celia" is about the long separation of William J. Pomeroy and his wife, Celia Mariano Pomeroy, because of their opposition to the colonial occupation of the Philippines by the United States. Also included was one of Ochs' most well-known songs, "Power and the Glory".

The title references the motto of The New York Times, "All the news that's fit to print." The Times was founded by Adolph Ochs (no relation to Phil), so this may be a joke or allusion to the coincidence.

== Track listing ==
All songs by Phil Ochs unless otherwise noted.

1. "One More Parade" (Ochs, Bob Gibson) – 3:00
2. "The Thresher" – 2:50
3. "Talkin' Vietnam" – 3:38
4. "Lou Marsh" – 4:04
5. "Power and the Glory" – 2:15
6. "Celia" – 3:08
7. "The Bells" (E. A. Poe, with musical adaptation by Phil Ochs) – 3:00
8. "Automation Song" – 2:08
9. "Ballad of William Worthy" – 2:15
10. "Knock on the Door" – 2:47
11. "Talkin' Cuban Crisis" – 2:40
12. "Bound for Glory" – 3:15
13. "Too Many Martyrs" (Ochs, Bob Gibson) – 2:46
14. "What's That I Hear" – 2:00
15. "Bullets of Mexico" – 2:34 - bonus track on CD

== Personnel ==
- Phil Ochs – first guitar, vocals
- Danny Kalb – second guitar
- John Sebastian – harmonica on "Bound for Glory" (uncredited)

Technical

- Paul A. Rothchild – recording director
- Jac Holzman – production supervisor
