= Chuck box =

Patrol box
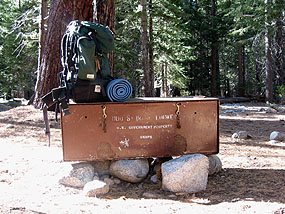

A chuck box, also called a patrol box or grub box, is a device used by campers for storing the many items associated with a camp kitchen. When packed up, it looks like a large box and traditionally contains kitchen items such as cooking pots, pans, plates, utensils, and cleaning items. The box will unpack (usually with a fold down front and sides) to reveal its contents in specifically designed compartments, shelves, drawers and racks. A patrol box is sometimes referred to jokingly as the "ark of the condiments."

== Background ==
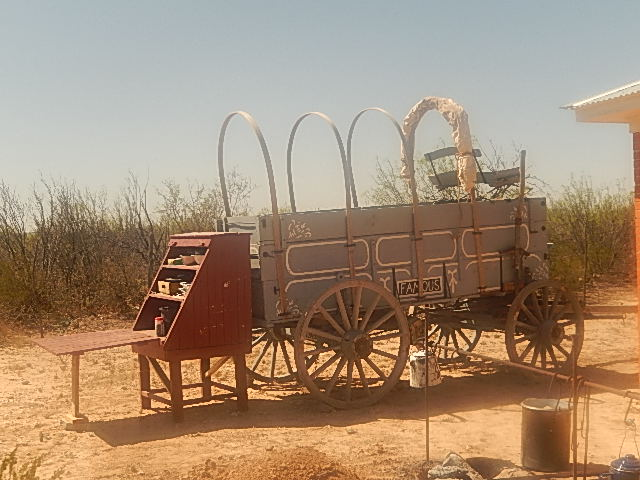
Chuck box next to wagon

It is generally believed that a chuck box evolved from a chuckwagon. (Chuck and grub are both "cowboy" terms for food.) A chuck box, grub box, camp box and patrol box (scouting version) are all the same thing.

The box is especially popular with Boy Scout camping, and boy scout troops generally maintain one box for each patrol, where they are referred to as patrol boxes. Building such boxes is often a service project for which scouts can earn awards while learning carpentry.

There are several models commercially available, but many campers choose to build their own to suit their personal camping checklist. Some campers use plastic storage containers or crates in lieu of custom built chuck boxes.

== Features ==
The minimum requirement of a chuck box is that it store the camper's camp kitchen devices. Additionally, common personal items such as toothbrushes, razor and toilet paper may also be stored in a chuck box. The primary advantage of having a chuck box is that it is easier to go camping quickly, because these numerous kitchen items are always packed and ready. However, some chuck boxes are also designed to provide work surfaces and utility features, providing the significant benefit of additional kitchen table space.

== See also ==
- Duluth pack
