= Chuckwagon =

American field kitchen covered wagon

An authentic chuckwagon at the Frontier Town grounds in Cheyenne, Wyoming

A chuckwagon, or chuck wagon, is a horse-drawn wagon operating as a mobile field kitchen and frequently covered with a white tarpaulin, also called a camp wagon or round-up wagon. It was historically used for the storage and transportation of food and cooking equipment on the prairies of the United States and Canada. They were included in wagon trains for settlers and traveling workers such as cowboys or loggers. In modern times, chuckwagons feature in special cooking competitions and events. Chuckwagons are also used in a type of competition known as chuckwagon racing.

== History and description ==
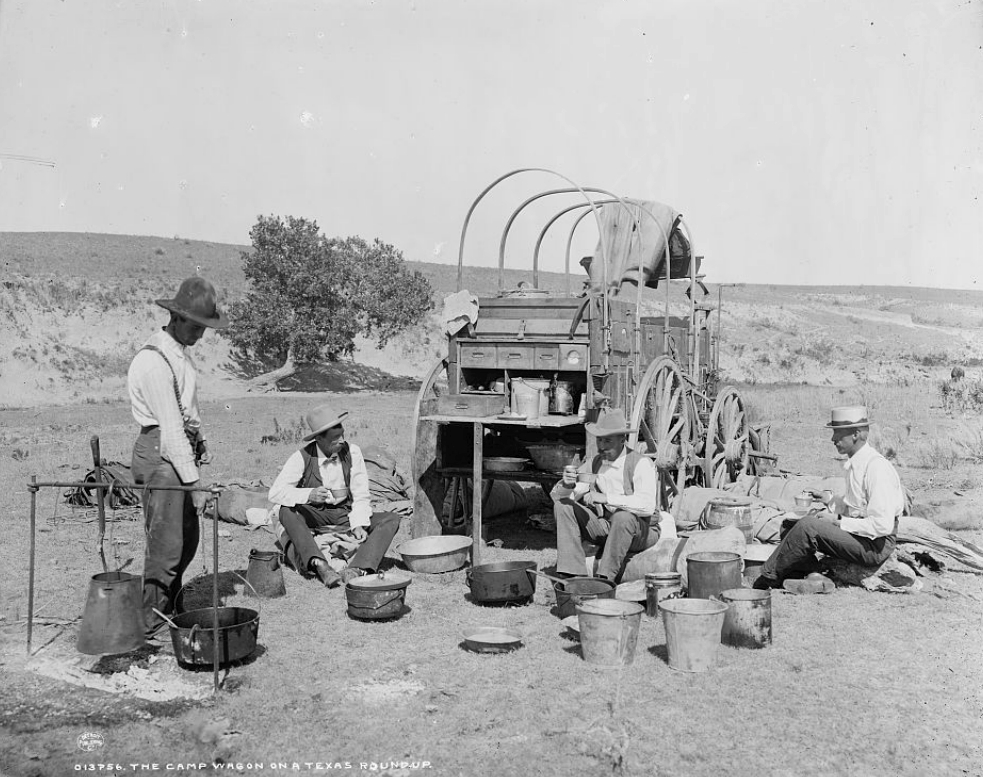
Chuckwagon on a Texas roundup, 1900

While some form of mobile kitchens had existed for generations, the invention of the chuckwagon is attributed to Charles Goodnight, a Texas rancher known as the "father of the Texas Panhandle," who introduced the concept in 1866. After the American Civil War, the beef market in Texas expanded. Some cattlemen herded cattle in parts of the country that did not have railroads, requiring them to be fed on the road for months at a time. Goodnight modified a Studebaker-manufactured covered wagon, a durable Civil War army-surplus wagon, to suit the needs of cowboys driving cattle from Texas to sell in New Mexico. He added a "chuck box" to the back of the wagon, with drawers and shelves for storage space and a hinged lid to provide a flat working surface. A water barrel was also attached to the wagon and canvas was hung underneath to carry firewood. A wagon box was used to store cooking supplies and cowboys' personal items.

Chuckwagon food typically included easy-to-preserve items such as baked beans, salted meats, coffee, and sourdough biscuits. Food would also be gathered en route. There were no fresh fruit, vegetables, or eggs available, and meat was not fresh unless an animal was injured during the drive and therefore had to be killed. The meats were greasy cloth-wrapped bacon, salt pork, and beef, usually dried, salted or smoked. On cattle drives, it was common for the "cookie" who ran the wagon to be second in authority only to the "trailboss." The cookie would often act as cook, barber, dentist, and banker.

Doug Hansen, a contemporary restorer of old chuckwagons and maker of replicas, describes a chuck wagon as "a factory made-vehicle that [was] retrofitted with the chuck wagon equipment, to support a cowboss and his dozen wranglers in a cross-country trek." He says it takes about 750 man-hours to construct a new chuckwagon.

On the back of the wagon, they bolt in the chuck box, ... a combined cupboard and workspace that folds down as a work table. It stores cooking utensils, spices, and essential ingredients, such as dried beans and coffee. ... Underneath the chuck box [is] a pan boot to hold heavy pots and pans, such as a Dutch oven, which could bake well when surrounded by coals. ... [C]arrying fuel, food, cooking implements, a water barrel, and bedding ... loaded chuck wagons could weigh several tons.

== Contemporary use ==
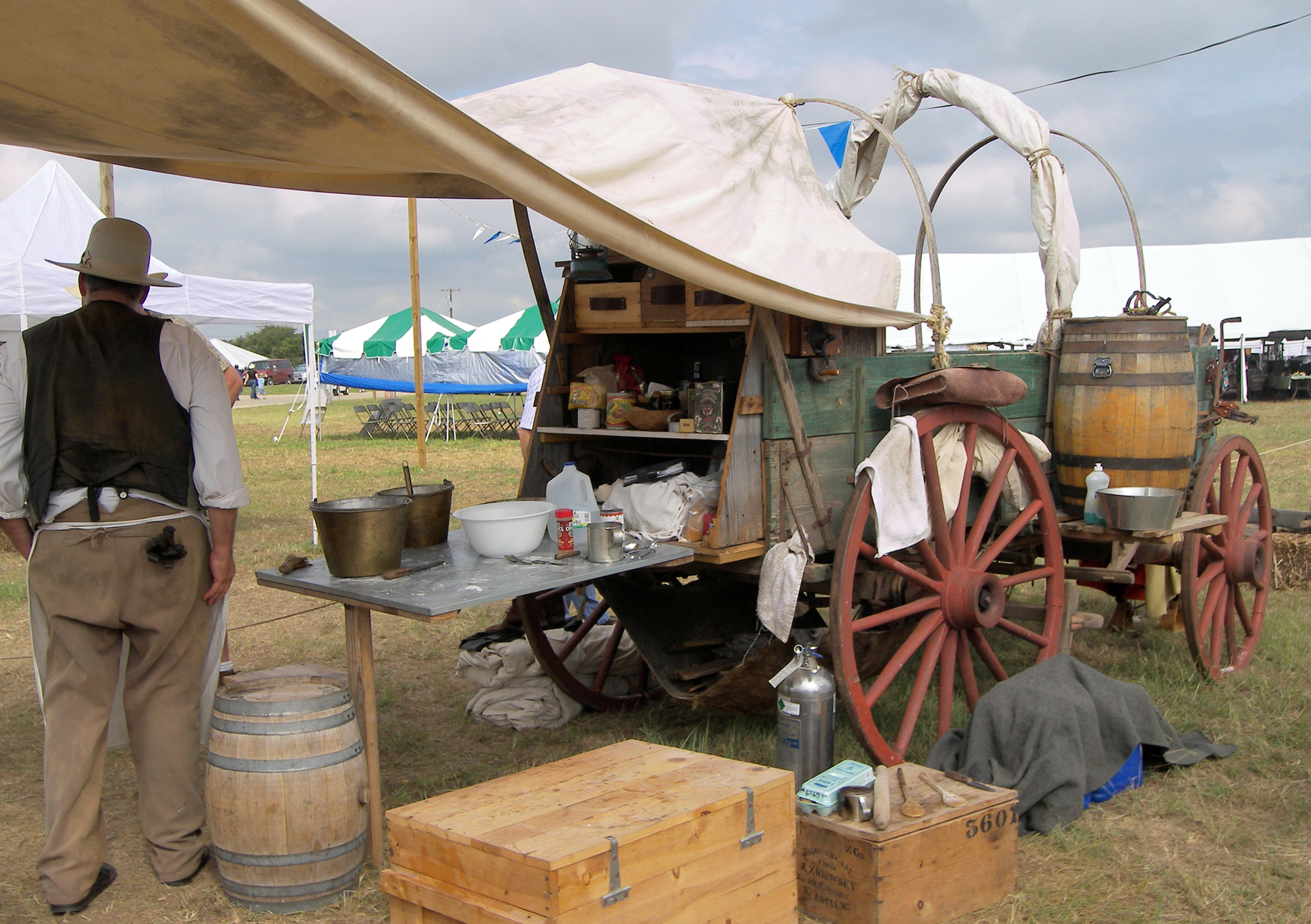
An authentic chuckwagon, Texas 2007

The American Chuck Wagon Association was formed in 1997 to "preserve the heritage of the chuck wagon" including educating the public and promoting chuckwagon activities. They document chuckwagon heritage including equipment, food, cooking styles, campsites, and clothing, and keep a registry of wagons. Its members participate in chuckwagon cook-off competitions throughout the US where teams are judged on their cooking as well as the authenticity of their vehicle.

The Academy of Western Artists presents an annual award for outstanding chuckwagon cooking, as well as honors in other fields relating to the culture of the American cowboy.

Chuckwagon cook-offs are typically annual events open to the public or private events with hired chuckwagon caterers. Chuckwagon suppers are held across the traditional cattle ranges of the Western United States and Western Canada, either on their own or as part of a trail ride or stay at a dude ranch.

== Chuckwagon races ==
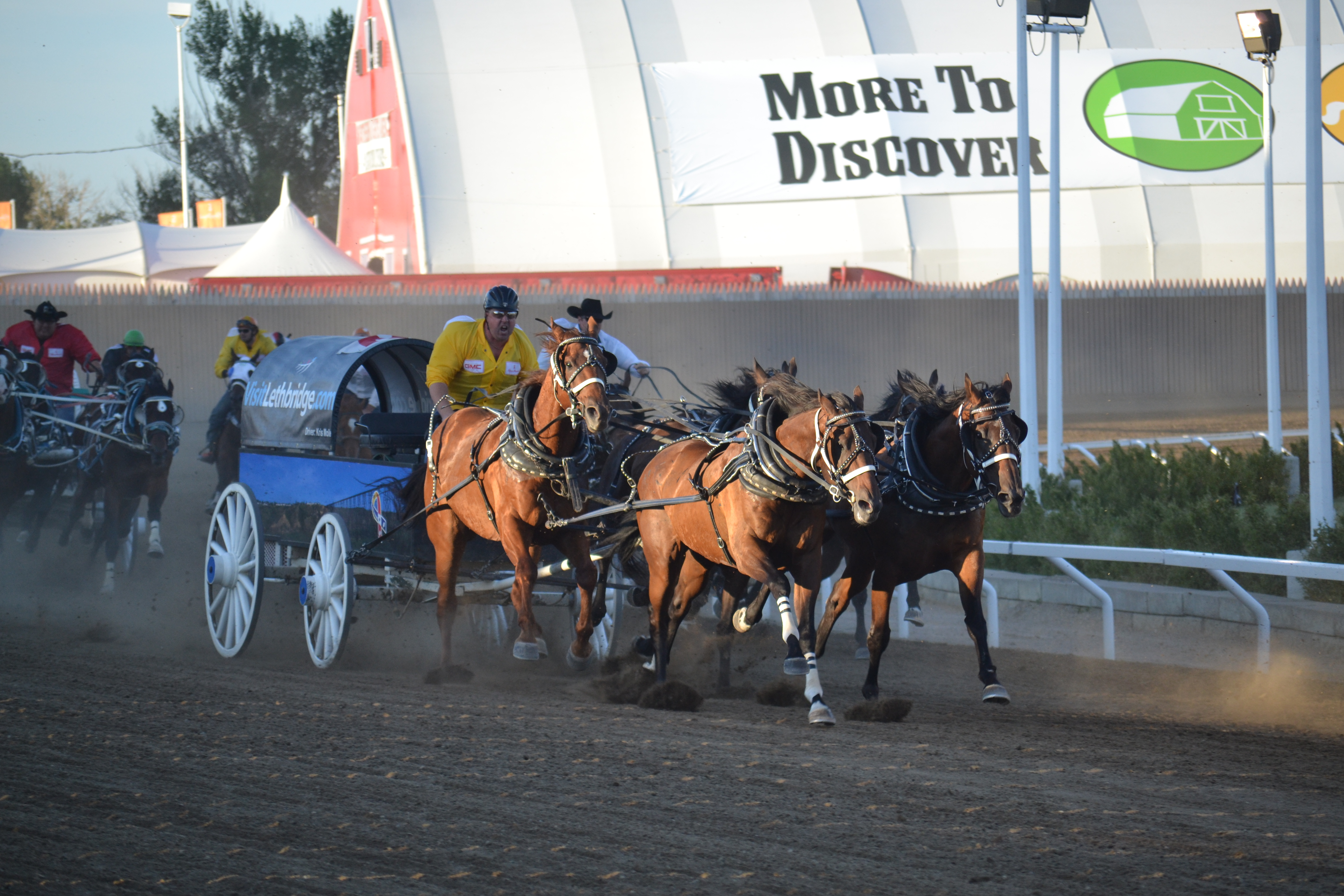
The Rangeland Derby race at the Calgary Stampede (2017)

Chuckwagon racing is an event at some rodeos, such as the Calgary Stampede which started in 1923. Chuckwagon races were held from 1952 until 1998 at Cheyenne Frontier Days, one of America's biggest rodeos. The National Championship Chuckwagon Race in Clinton, Arkansas draws tens of thousands each Labor Day weekend.

These competitions use modern stripped-down versions of chuckwagons usually pulled by a team of four horses. The driver and his outriders "break camp" by tossing a barrel (the 'stove') and some 'tent poles' into the wagon, complete a figure eight around two barrels, then circle a race track. The outriders and all equipment must finish the race course along with the chuckwagon.

== See also ==
- Cookhouse
- Covered wagon
- Field kitchen
- Food truck
