= Kitafahrten =

Kitafahrten (fahrten means "trip" or "wanderings" and Kita is short for Kindertagesstätte or "children's daycare center") is an annual multi-day camping trip for German kindergarten children, designed to increase responsibility for self and others by placing them in nature and away from their parents. A teacher supervises the children during the camping trip and contact with parents is only allowed in emergencies. The concept and the word itself were created by Friedrich Fröbel in the 19th century. He also created the concept of kindergarten. It is popular in Berlin but not throughout all of Germany.
