= Cunningham's Camp Escalator =

Coordinates: 54.167°N 4.468°W

Cunningham's Camp Escalator was a moving seated escalator open c. 1919 to 1968 from a short distance behind the promenade in Douglas, Isle of Man, to Cunningham's holiday camp on Victoria Road.

Although sometimes described as a 'chairlift', this was a ground-level escalator covered by a roof, albeit with seats, rather than an overhead chairlift as used in ski resorts.

Cunningham's camp, one of the earliest holiday camps in the British Isles (pre-dating Butlins), opened around 1902 and initially had only steps leading to it from the seafront. The escalator was installed just after the First World War. It is thought to have been built by JT Skillicorn of Onchan. In 1938, a second escalator was provided, both working in only the up direction and running within a wooden shelter.

The escalator last functioned in 1968, after which it was closed off but not demolished. In the 1990s the entrance was bricked over owing to the site being the target of vandalism. Since that time visitors can only view the large red brick and stone archway midway up Little Switzerland Road (site of today's Edelweiss Hotel). Behind the facade remain the turnstiles, and toilets with ceramic tiles and copper pipework, before reaching the approach steps to the escalator. The fascinating design is split into two parts, an "up" and "down" section, and each has its own set of moving wooden seats accompanied by steps for the more energetic.

The system has been left to decay since closure, particularly since being bricked up. At the start of 2013 it was announced that it is to be demolished.

== See also ==
- Transport on the Isle of Man
