= Camp Favorites =

Studio album / Children's album by Phil Ochs (made anonymously)
- Released: 1962–63
- Recorded: 1962–63
- Genre: Folk, children's music
- Label: Cameo

Phil Ochs (made anonymously) chronology
Camp Favorites (1962)	All the News That's Fit to Sing (1964)

Camp Favorites is a studio album by "The Campers" that was released in 1962 or 1963 by Cameo Records. It is the first known commercial record made by folksinger, songwriter, and social activist Phil Ochs.

"The Campers" consist of Ochs (who is not credited on the record), an unknown female vocalist, and a group of young singers, accompanied by Dick Weissman on banjo.

The tracks on Camp Favorites are traditional songs that children might sing at summer camp, and the record sleeve is illustrated with a group of youngsters singing around a campfire.

Camp Favorites was unknown among Phil Ochs fans until 2000, when David Cohen prepared his comprehensive catalog of Ochs' works (Phil Ochs: A Bio-Bibliography, ISBN 0-313-31029-7). Michael Ochs, Ochs' brother and former manager, told Cohen that Phil had recorded a record of campfire songs, but that his name was not used on the album. Nobody in the Ochs family had ever seen a copy of the album. After considerable research, Cohen was able to identify Camp Favorites and locate a copy.

This album can be listened to online.

== Track listing ==
=== Side one ===
1. "The Welcome Song" (Traditional – 1:46)
2. "We'll Build a Bungalow" (Traditional – 2:02)
3. "Polly Wolly Doodle" (Traditional – 2:08)
4. "Gee Mom" (Traditional – 2:13)
5. "Patsy Ory Ory Aye" (Traditional – 2:11)
6. "Cannibal King" (Traditional – 2:21)

=== Side two ===
1. "Hambone" (Traditional – 3:11)
2. "Friends Friends Friends" (Traditional – 1:49)
3. "I've Got Sixpence" (Traditional – 2:00)
4. "A Thousand Years Ago" (Traditional – 2:10)
5. "Adam and Eve" (Traditional – 2:05)
6. "Hand Me Down My Walkin' Cane" (Traditional – 2:01)

== Participants ==
- Phil Ochs – vocals
- Other unknown vocalists
- Dick Weissman – banjo
