= Mack's Apples =

Farm in Londonderry, New Hampshire, United States

Coordinates: 42°51′30.4″N 71°22′10.7″W

- Mack's Apples' logo
- Type: Private
- Industry: Farming
- Founded: 1732; 294 years ago
- Founder: John Mack
- Headquarters: 230 Mammoth Rd, Londonderry, New Hampshire, United States
- Key people: Andrew Mack Jr., co-owner Carol Mack, co-owner
- Website: macksapples.com

Mack's Apples (also known as Moose Hill Orchards) is a farm and orchard in Londonderry, New Hampshire, United States. It is the oldest family-run farm in the state, having been run by the Mack family for eight generations until its sale in 2021.

== History ==
The farm was founded in 1732 when John Mack emigrated from Londonderry, Ireland, to Londonderry, New Hampshire. In the 1800s, the family began to concentrate on growing apples, and the farm was formally registered as a business in 1962. The farm eliminated its wholesale operations in the early 2000s. In 2015, Andy Mack Sr. transferred ownership to his son, Andy Mack Jr., and his daughter-in-law, Carol Mack.

In 2021, after eight generations of Mack family ownership, the farm was sold to MHO Acquisitions LLC who intend to continue operating the orchard.

== Operations ==
Mack's Apples operates on approximately 400 acres (160 ha) of land in the center of Londonderry, with 100 acres (40 ha) devoted to apples. The farm store sells numerous varieties of apples, as well as peaches, pumpkins, squash, maple syrup, and honey. The farm also runs a pick-your-own apples offering and an ice cream stand.

The town of Londonderry has purchased conservation easements to help preserve the farm as green space, including a 23-acre parcel of orchard land along Pillsbury Road.

The farm is a frequent stop for liberal politicians visiting Londonderry, including Barack Obama on three occasions, Kamala Harris, Joe Biden, Bernie Sanders, and members of the Bush family. Andy Mack Sr. often places signs on the property supporting progressive issues.

== Gallery ==
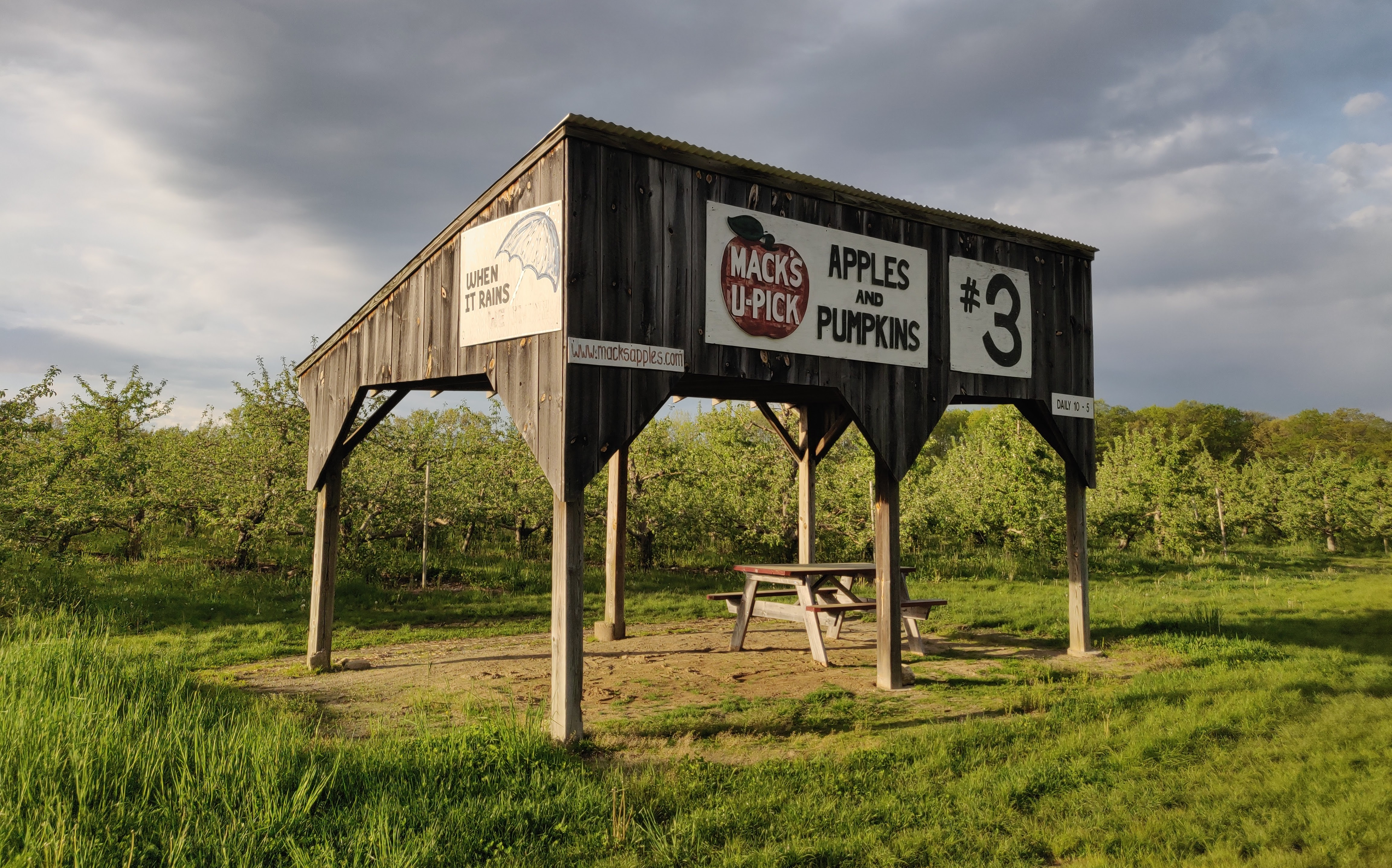
Orchard shed

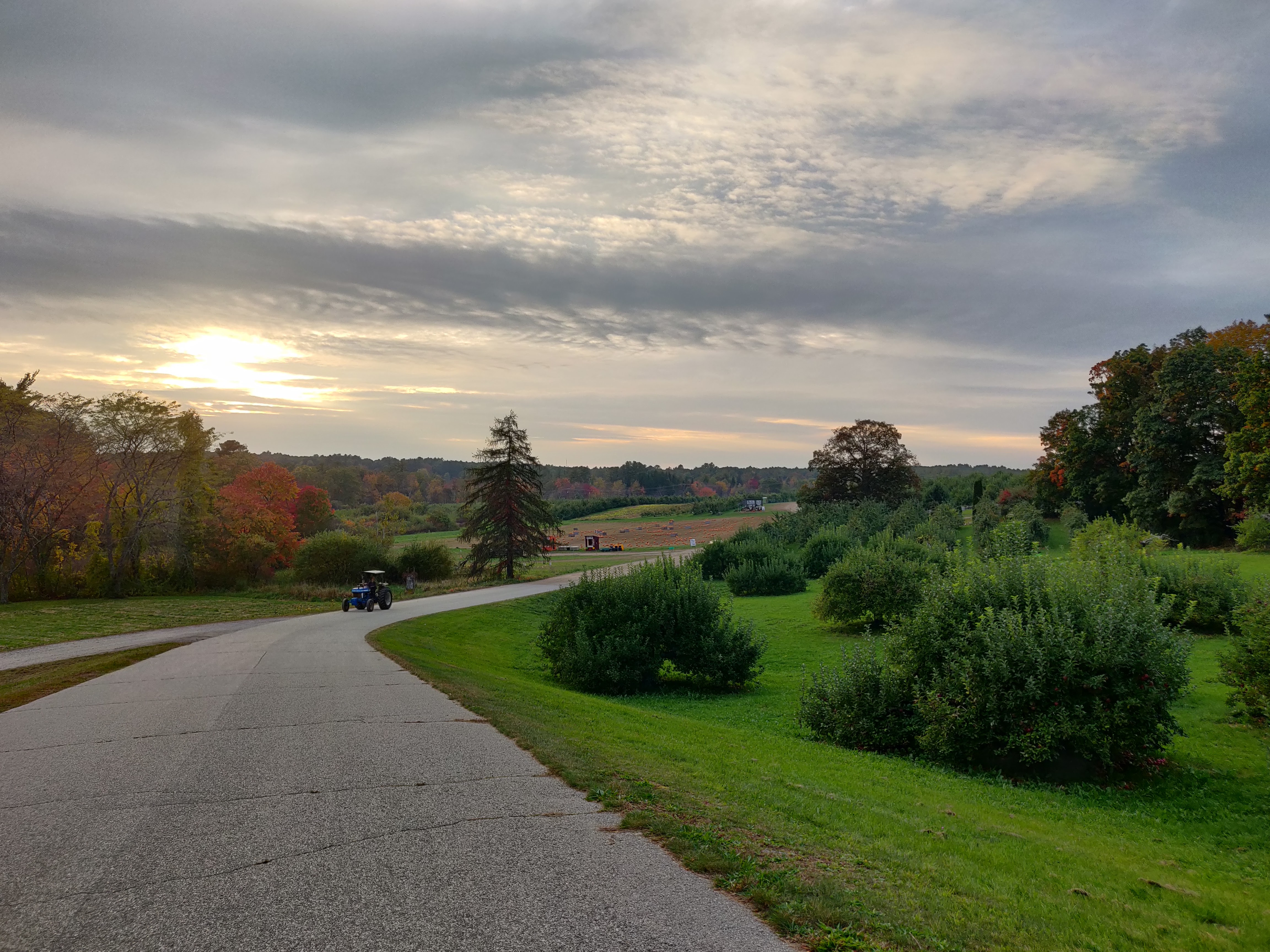
Farm road and apple trees

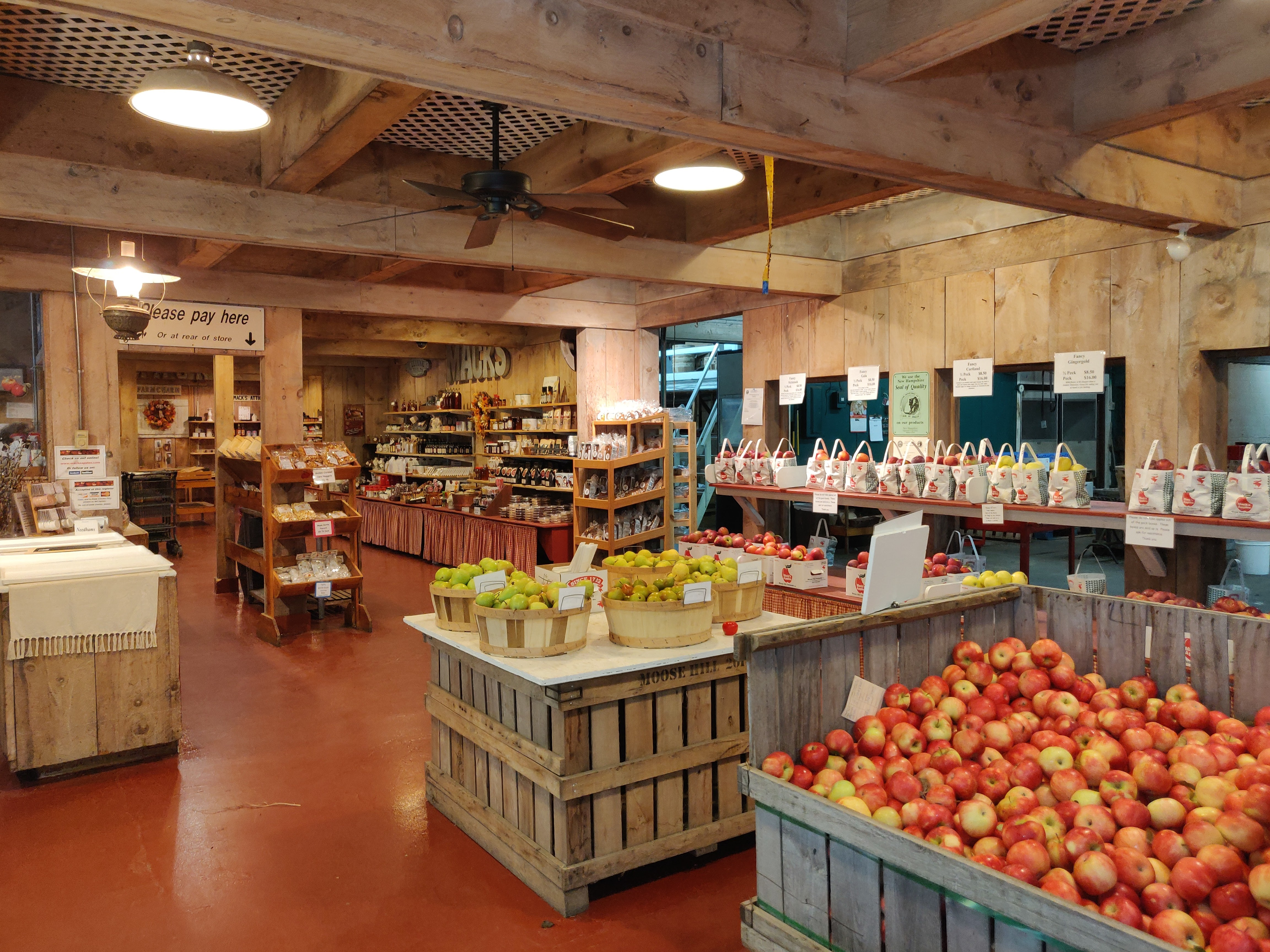
Farmers' market interior

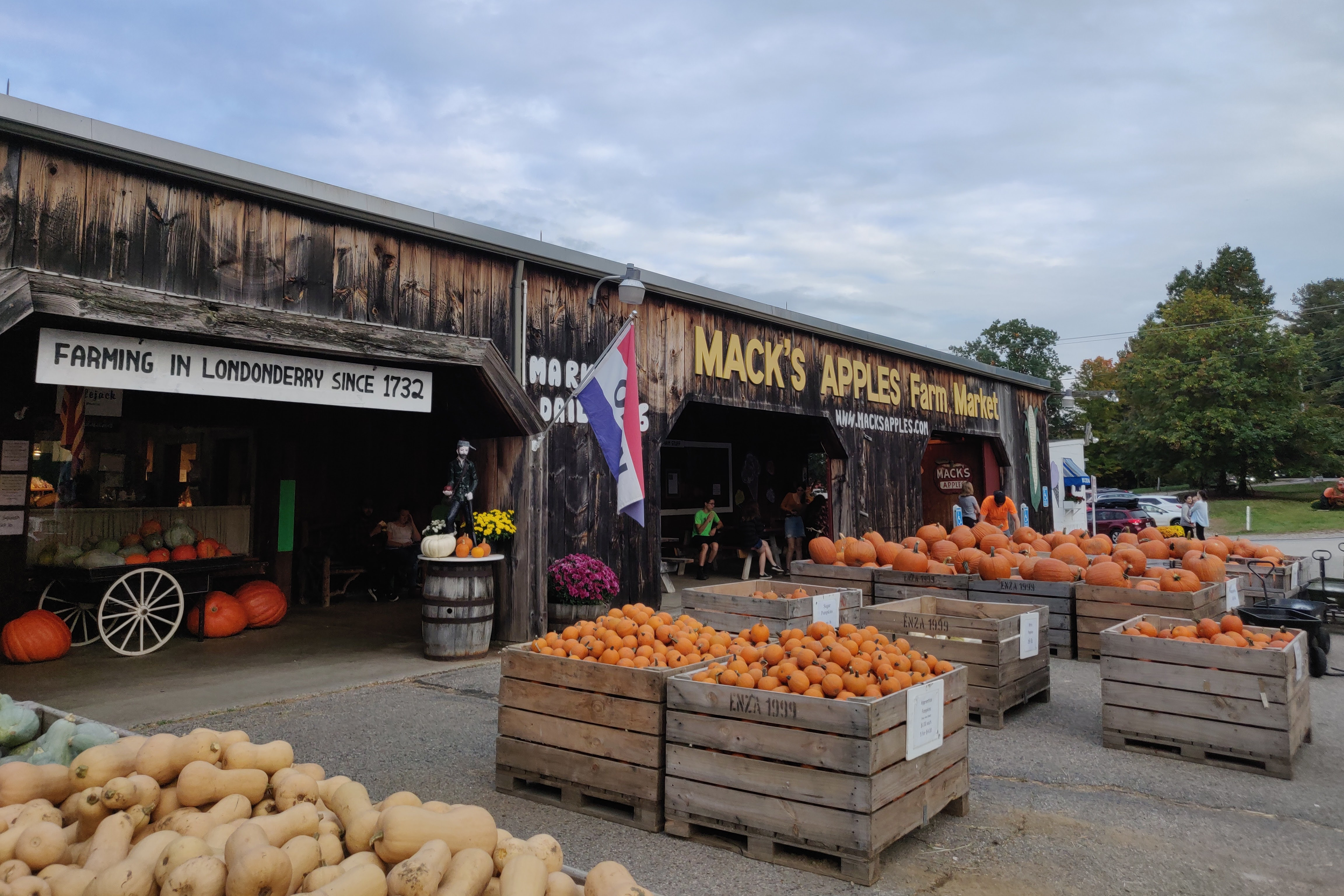
Farmers' market exterior

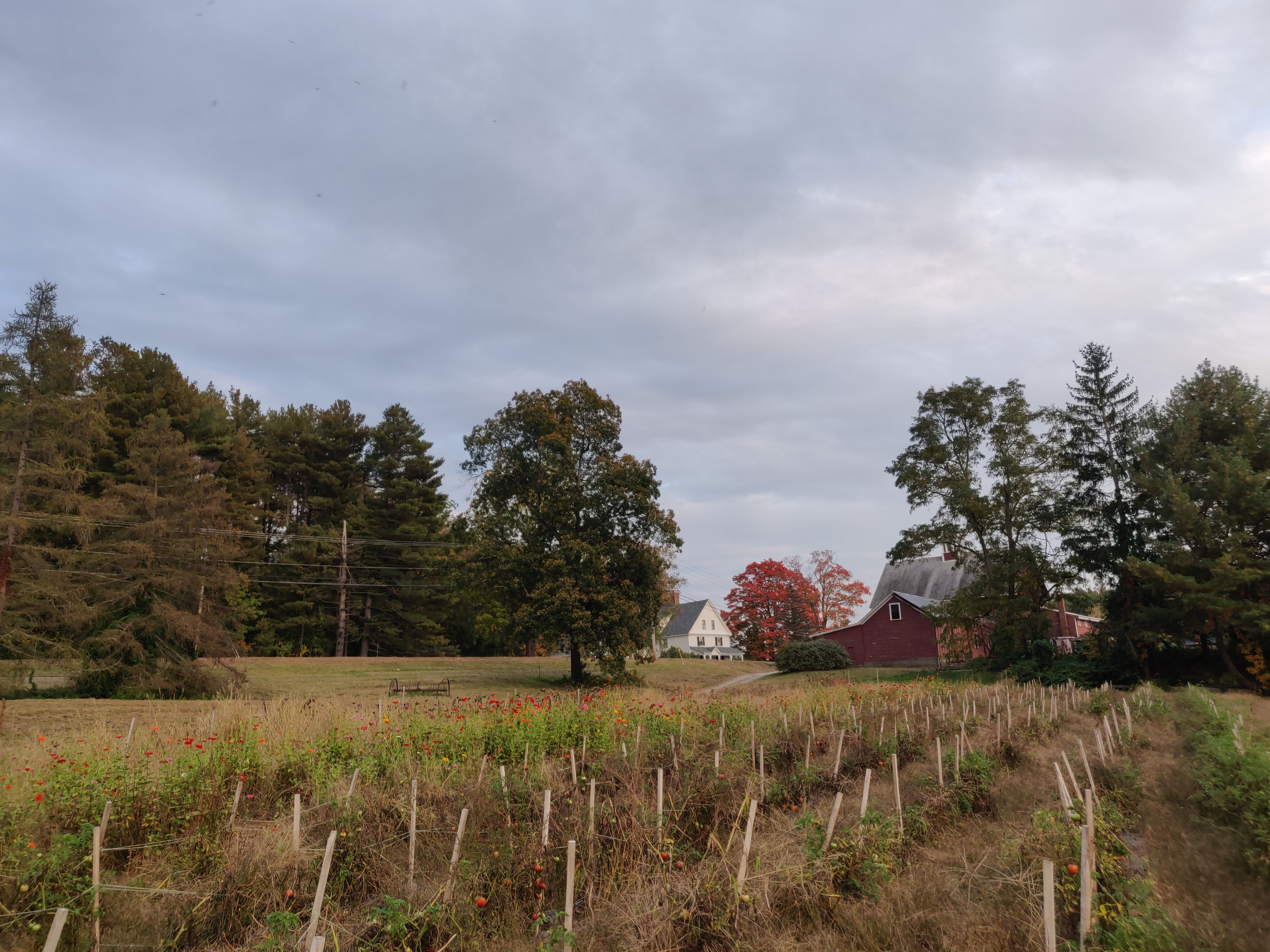
Fields in October

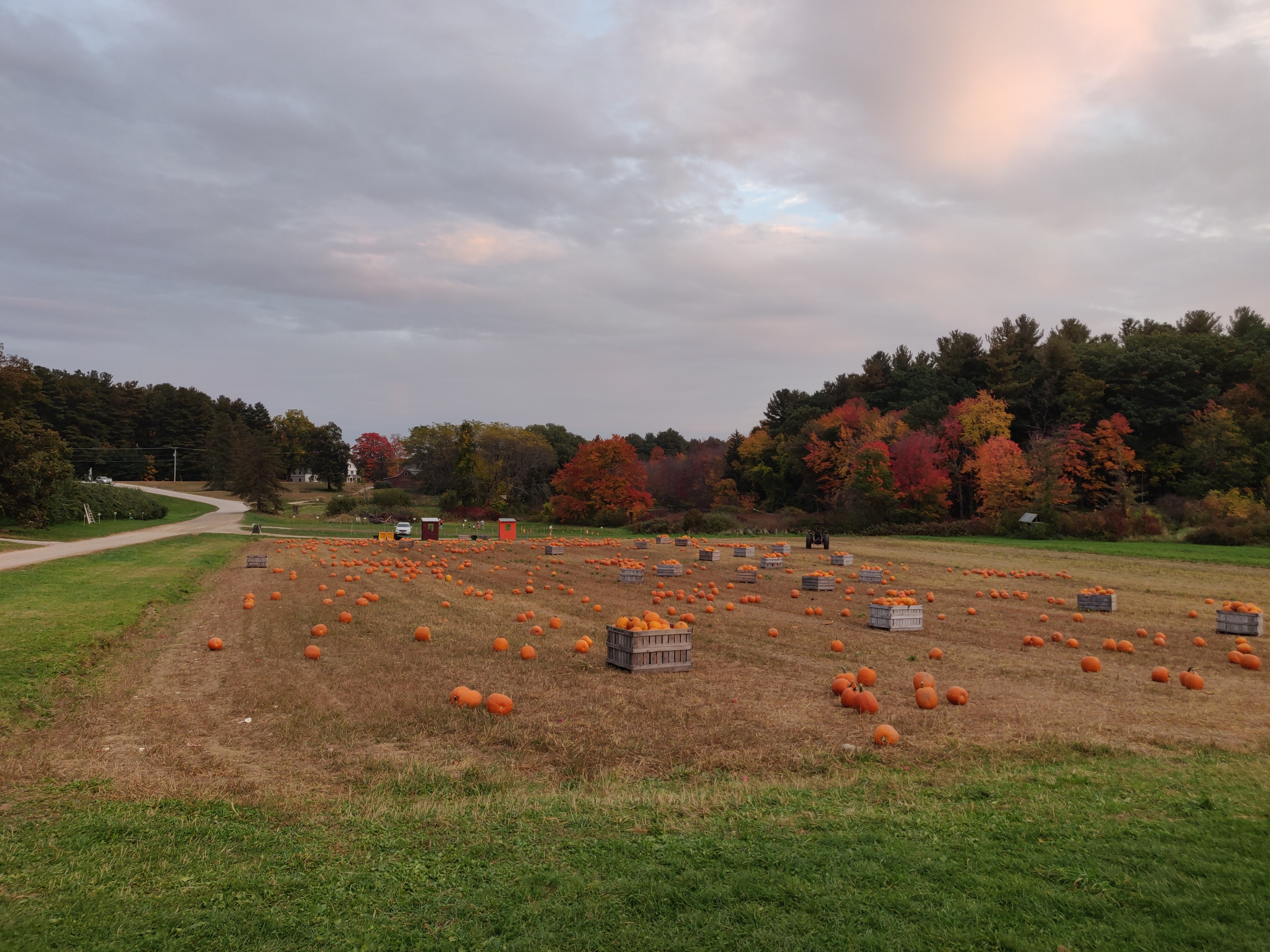
Pumpkin field

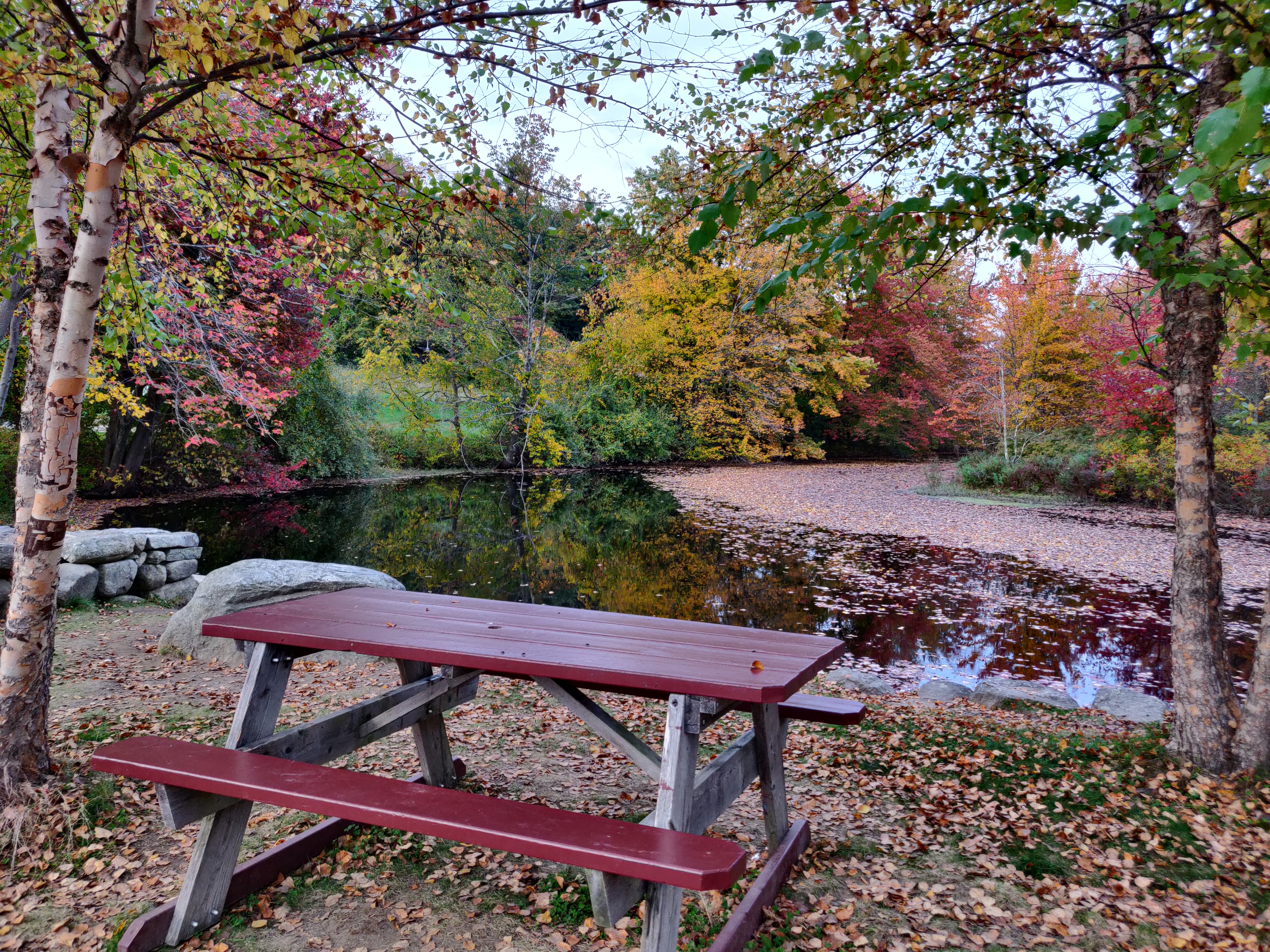
Picnic area and stream

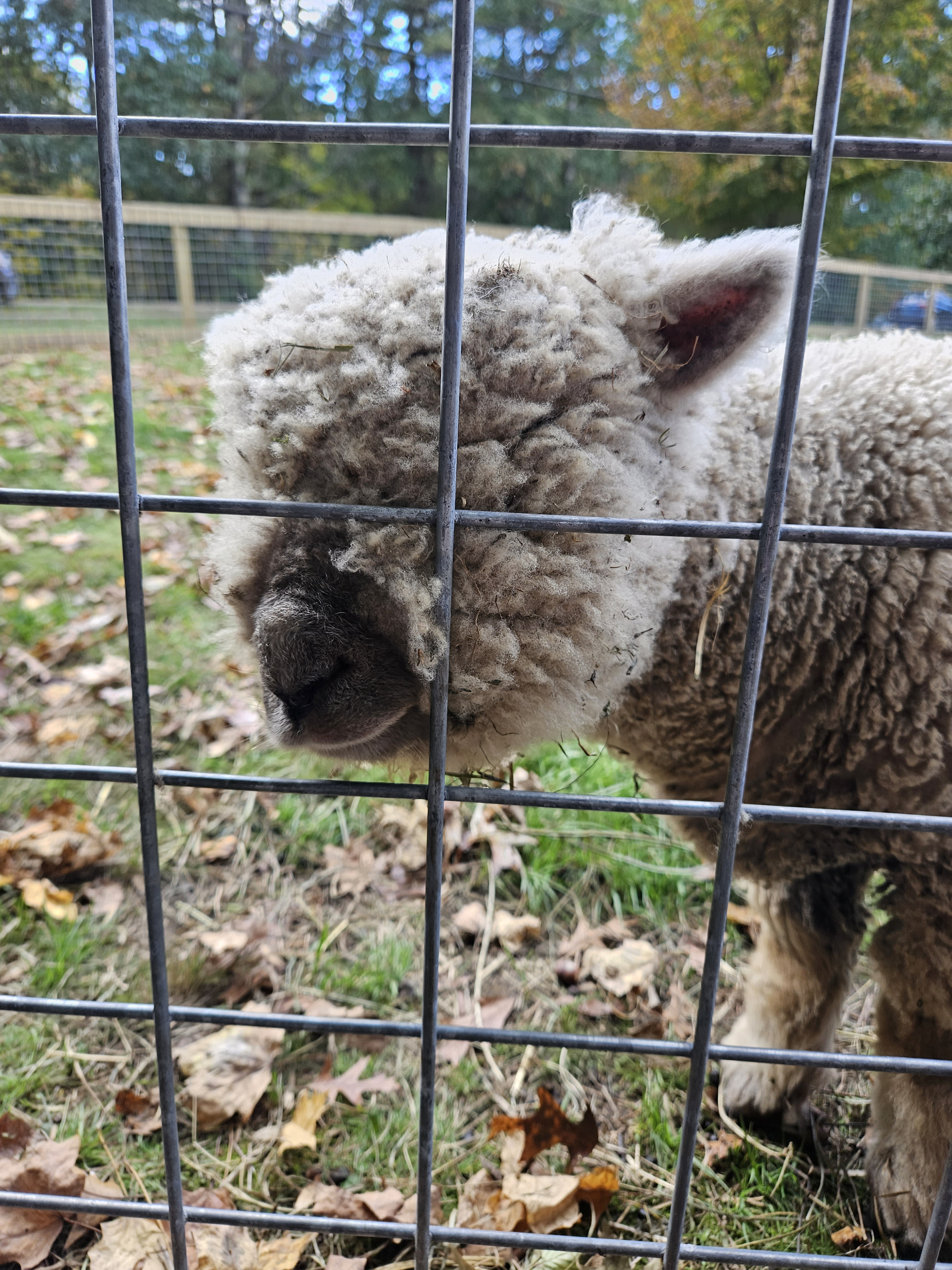
One of several sheep
