= Agritourism =

Tourism involving agriculture

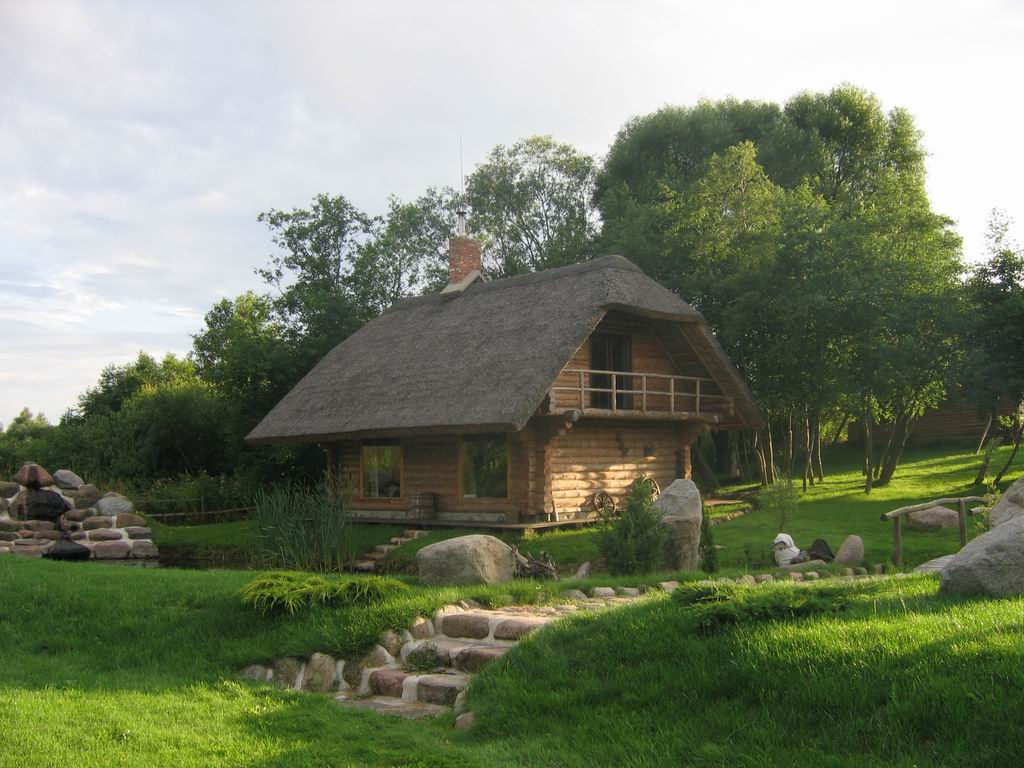
A lodging cottage in a rural area of Lithuania

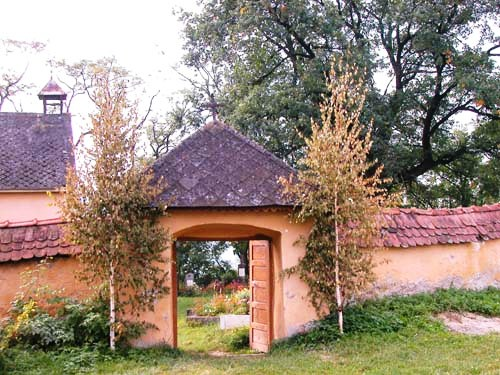
Rural building in Covasna, Romania

Agritourism or agrotourism involves any agriculturally based operation or activity that brings visitors to a farm or ranch.

== Types ==
A 2018 article published in the Journal of Agriculture, Food Systems, and Community Development classified agritourism activities as falling into one or more categories: direct-to-consumer sales (e.g., farm stands, u-pick), agricultural education (e.g., schools visits to a farm), hospitality (overnight farm stays), recreation (e.g., hunting, horseback riding), and entertainment (e.g., hayrides, harvest dinners). Most agritourists spent time visiting farm stands, picking fruit, or feeding animals; others may navigate a corn maze or do a farm stay, assisting with chores or agricultural or ranch work.

- Indirect approaches: Agricultural products are sold to tourist facilities. Examples include farmers' markets where local products are sold directly to tourists.
- Direct approaches: Providers are engaged in both agriculture and tourism. Activities include visits to wineries, pick-your-own fields, agricultural information centers, farm stays, and harvest festivals.

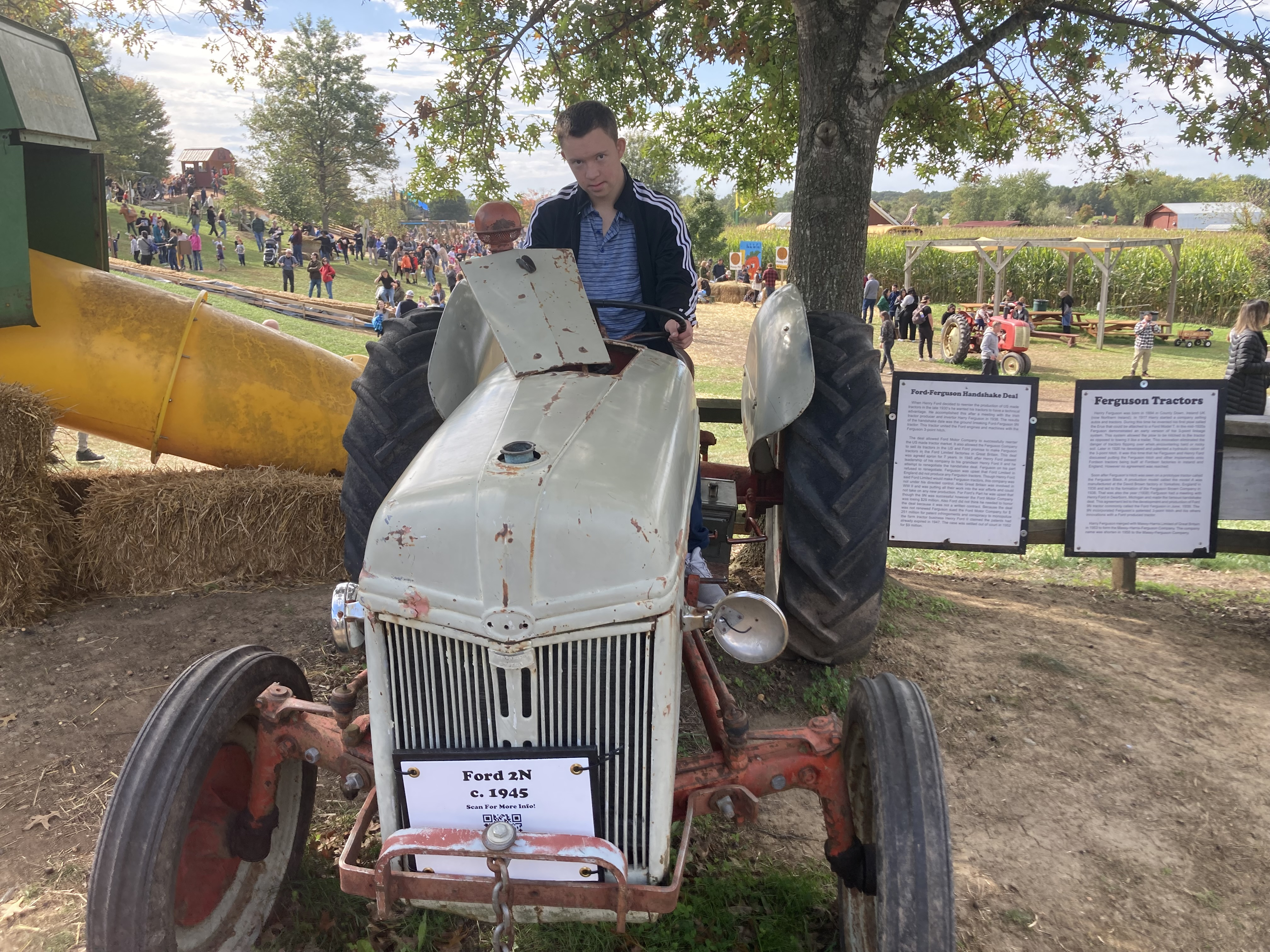
An entertainment farm in Virginia, with available activities of sitting in antique tractors, a corn maze, and farm themed slides

== Economic benefits ==
Agricultural tourism has become a necessary means for many small farms’ survival. By diversifying business operations, farm operators are able to ensure a more stable income. This is because agritourism activities can occur during times of the year that crops may not be in season, and by providing a completely separate stream of income. Some studies have found that agritourism operations often benefit their surrounding communities by drawing tourists to the area. The economic boost by the increase in traffic can be beneficial to rural areas in need of diversified streams of income.

== Agritourism in various countries ==
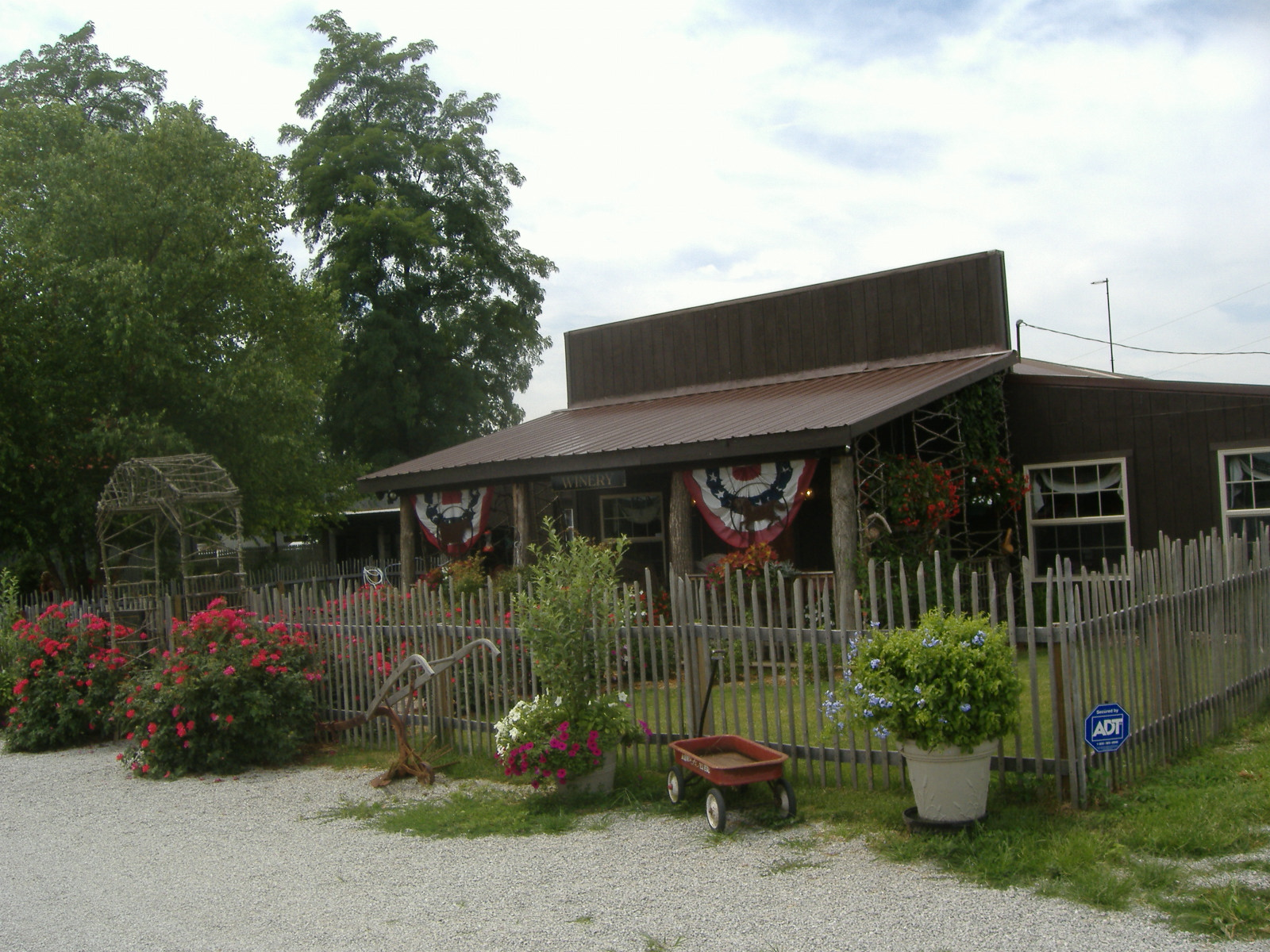
A herb farm in Indiana, United States

=== Armenia ===
The development of agritourism was of high importance in the process of revitalization of rural life in Armenia. Apart from participation in agricultural activities and farming, some more notable activities specific to Armenia are winemaking and carpet weaving.

There are also agricultural festivals and farmer's fairs organized every year, like the "Dolma" festival, "Barbeque (Khorovats)" festival, "Gata" festival, and many more.

=== India ===
85% of India's population is directly or indirectly dependent on agriculture and allied activities. Similarly, agriculture accounts for 26% of India's GDP. Maharashtra and Kerala are the states in India that are taking advantage of the potential of agritourism. In Maharashtra Agritourism is promoted by the Agri Tourism Development Corporation. Kuttanad, Wayanad, Palakkad and Idukki are some of the important agricultural areas in Kerala. The 'Green Farm' project launched by the Government of Kerala is aimed at promoting agro-tourism in Kerala. Apart from Kerala and Maharashtra, Nagaland and Sikkim are also successful agri-tourism states.

=== Italy ===
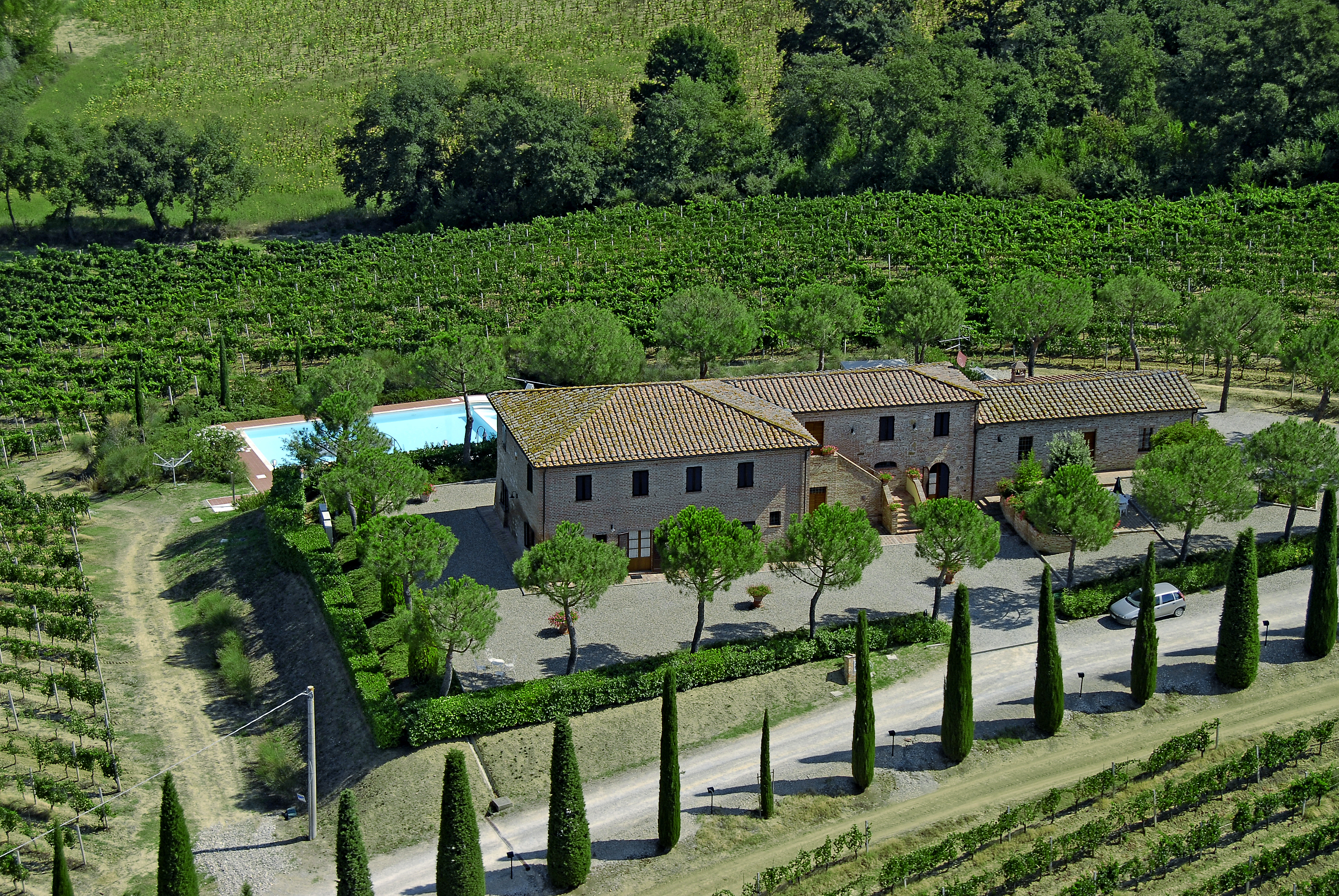
A winery in Montepulciano, Tuscany, Italy

Since 1985 agritourism in Italy is formally regulated by a state law, amended in 2006.

Starting in 2013 Italy has used a sector trademark, "Agriturismo Italia", accompanied by a new system of classification of farms with accommodation.
The trademark, which distinguishes farms regularly operating in accordance with existing laws and regulations, shows a sunflower enclosing a farm.
The classification (from 1 to 5 marks) represents the level of comfort, the variety of services and the quality of the natural environment that each farm is able to offer.
This system was implemented by the Ministry of Agriculture, in cooperation with all regional and national agritourism associations.
The national system thus offers an overall guarantee which still takes account of specific regional characteristics.

=== Pakistan ===
Pakistan is an agricultural country and agriculture is a vital sector of Pakistan's economy. About 65% of people live in rural areas and directly or indirectly relate to profession of agriculture. Agriculture in Pakistan accounts 21% of total GDP in the economy. Pakistan has natural resources for agriculture, like fertile land, four seasons, and a natural flow of water canals from north to south, including dams, barrages, headwork, canals, and distribution channels.

=== United Arab Emirates ===
UAE unveiled a pioneering plan in 2023, aimed at revamping the agricultural industry, opening up an array of opportunities for farmers to diversify their income streams to promote agritourism. The 'UAE Agritourism Program' allows people to experience conventional and modern agricultural practices at animal and crop farms, whilst aiming to increase the demand for locally grown produce. A new agritourism hub is also expected to create thousands of new jobs.

=== United States ===
Through the Small Farm Center at the University of California, "Agricultural tourism or agritourism, is one alternative for improving the incomes and potential economic viability of small farms and rural communities. Some forms of agritourism enterprises are well developed in California, including fairs and festivals. Other possibilities still offer potential for development". The UC Small Farm Center has developed a California Agritourism Database that "provides visitors and potential entrepreneurs with information about existing agritourism locations throughout the state".

=== United Kingdom ===
According to a 2011 article in the journal Tourism Planning and Development, agritourism has become economically important to the agriculture sector in North West England, as farmers seek to diversify their income streams.

Thailand

Agritourism in Thailand grows dramatically after 2021. People concern more on healthy food, wellness and community sustainable living. Agritourism can promote sustainable agricultural practice and raising awareness about the importance of environment.

Examples of agritourism in Thailand:

Farm Stays

Farm Tours

Farm Product Festival

Workshops

== See also ==
- Agricultural show
- Ecotourism
- Enotourism (wine tourism)
- Geotourism
- Guest ranch (dude ranch)
- Harvest Hosts
- Rural Ramble
- Rural tourism
- WWOOF (World Wide Opportunities on Organic Farms, or Willing Workers on Organic Farms)
- You-Pick
