= Rural Ramble =

The Rural Ramble is an annual summer farm tour made up of a selection of regional farms showcasing many aspects of the local agricultural operations. It is an example of agritourism which provides opportunities for non-farm people to learn first hand where their food comes from, and to foster a broader understanding of the importance of agriculture today. Frequently tours highlight the history of farming in Ontario along with today's practices and technology.

New host sites come onto the tour and older ones leave, so the tour is unique each year. Host farms and rural businesses are listed in a "passport" booklet, which contains information about the sites and a map of the county showing how to find each place. Wristbands sold at various pre-event sales outlets and at the gates on the tour days provide admission for children and adults.

== Northumberland County ==
The Northumberland County, Ontario Rural Ramble is hosted by the members of the Northumberland Federation of Agriculture. The Northumberland County tour occurs each August on the third weekend, from 10 am until 4 pm on both Saturday and Sunday. It has been held annually since 1999. Dairy, pork, poultry, horticultural, alternative, organic, beef, bison, maple sugar, honey, sheep, equestrian, alpaca and many other kinds of agricultural operations have been showcased on the tour over the years.

Each year may bring one or two "century farms"—those farms who have earned a "century" designation through having been in business for 100 years or more, often in the same family—to public notice and there are always displays showing how things WERE done and how things ARE done now.

A limited number of commercial outlets related to agriculture are allowed to join the tour each year, and these outlets are only allowed to be a part of the tour twice before they are required to allow someone else a turn. Such outlets allow the tour to help highlight farm gate or rural business locations that otherwise might not be noticed by urbanites and encourage tour visitors to participate in the shop local movement during and after the weekend.

Many of the towns and villages of the County have activities and events occurring on the same weekend—things like the Warkworth Long Lunch, the RibFest, and the Havelock Country Jamboree occur at the same time, so visitors can combine events and make a weekend of it.

== Ottawa Valley ==
A similar tour in scope and intent is the annual September Rural Ramble in the Ottawa Valley Region.
