= Booker T. Whatley =

American agriculture professor

- Born: November 5, 1915; Calhoun County, Alabama
- Died: September 3, 2005 (aged 89); Montgomery, Alabama
- Education: Alabama A & M University
- Alma mater: Rutgers University
- Known for: One of the pioneers of sustainable agriculture in the post-World War II era
- Spouse: Lottie
- Scientific career
- Fields: Agriculture
- Institutions: Tuskegee University

Booker T. Whatley (November 5, 1915, in Calhoun County, Alabama – September 3, 2005, in Montgomery, Alabama) was an agriculture professor at Tuskegee University, Alabama, and a pioneer of sustainable agriculture in the post-World War II era. He also aimed to "generate an agrarian black middle class".

== Regenerative farming system ==
Dr. Whatley is best known for his regenerative farming system, in combination with the direct marketing concept of pick-your-own (PYO), a customer harvesting operation managed by farmers and growers. He also popularized the concept of subscription buyers club for small farmers either as a separate business from a PYO operation or in conjunction with it. Today, PYO (or u-pick) farms are a worldwide phenomenon.

Whatley believed that the regenerative agriculture for small farmers made greater use of the internal resources that a farm produced and, therefore, when properly managed would provide a more sustainable livelihood. Regenerative agriculture has a long history and can be traced to the agricultural extension work of Dr. George Washington Carver at Tuskegee University in the early part of the 20th century, as well as Carver's scientific contributions regarding the nitrogen cycle and the biological regeneration of soils in the southern United States where he introduced crop rotation methods in combination with the planting of nitrogen-fixing legumes, such as peanuts, peas, and soybeans.

== Education ==
Raised on a family farm in Anniston, Alabama as the oldest of his parents' 12 children, Booker T. Whatley received his B.S. degree in agriculture from Alabama A & M University. Upon graduation, he was drafted into the U.S. Army during the Korean War, where he was assigned to manage a hydroponic farm in Japan to provide safe, nutritious foods for the US troops stationed there. After completing his military service, and encouraged by the scientist who interviewed him for his assignment in Japan, Whatley enrolled at Rutgers University to earn a doctorate in horticulture, which he completed in 1957. He later earned a law degree from Alabama A&M University in 1989.

== Early years ==
Around 1970, Dr. Whatley, who started his professional career at Tuskegee, began championing "smaller and smarter" as a successful strategy for small farmers, rather than competing for the same market as large farmers, and going broke in the process. Small farmers, he advised, should not raise commodity crops such as grains, but should instead raise higher-value crops such as berries and grapes and market them to a loyal group of customers (target: 1,000), who would harvest the crops themselves and pay for the privilege of doing so as members of a Clientele Membership Club.

Whatley counseled farmers to put greater emphasis on marketing and identifying high-value crops and enterprises that are more profitable on smaller units of land, and, most of all, to pay greater attention to their farm's internal resources to their benefit. By internal resources, Whatley meant the land and its soil, "the sun, air, rain, plants, animals, people, and all the other physical resources that are within the immediate environment of every farm."

== The Whatley Plan ==
The Whatley Diversified Plan for Small Farms, which he adopted as regenerative agriculture (a method of sustainable agriculture) from his association with Robert Rodale, the Rodale Institute and New Farm, involves four core components:

1. Creating a biodiversified PYO (pick-your-own or U-Pick) farm between 10 and 200 acres (0.81 km^{2});
2. Producing at least 10 different products (agricultural and/or artisanal) on a year-round basis that are supported through a Clientele Membership Club (CMC), and operating in a county-wide area with a population of at least 50,000 residents;
3. Marketing to CMC members for 40% of supermarket pricing; and
4. Yield a profit.

Whatley's broader philosophy is summarized in "The Guru's" (Dr. Whatley) 10 Commandments.

Thy small farm shalt:

1. Provide year-round, daily cash flow.
2. Be a pick-your-own operation.
3. Have a guaranteed market with a Clientele Membership Club.
4. Provide year-round, full-time employment.
5. Be located on a hard-surfaced road within a radius of 40 miles of a population center of at least 50,000, with well-drained soil and an excellent source of water.
6. Produce only what they clients demand—and nothing else!
7. Shun middlemen and middlewomen like the plague, for they are a curse upon thee.
8. Consist of compatible, complementary crop components that earn a minimum of $3,000 per acre annually.
9. Be 'weatherproof', at least as far as possible with both drip and sprinkler irrigation.
10. Be covered by a minimum of $250,000 worth ($1 million is better) of liability insurance.

== Later years ==
Upon retirement from academia, Whatley focused on promoting his system of small-scale farming, quickly becoming a nationally known expert and an inspiration to readers of Mother Earth News and Organic Gardening Magazine in the 1980s. To further expand his audience and to deliver his message for turning a small farm into a profitable enterprise, Whatley traveled extensively in the US and overseas, giving training seminars and sharing his ideas. Many of his ideas appeared over time in The New Farm Magazine and in his monthly Small Farm Technical Newsletter, which reached about 20,000 subscribers in fifty states and twenty-five foreign countries.

In 1985, Tom Monaghan, founder and former president of Domino's Pizza, Inc., was so inspired after reading in The Wall Street Journal about Whatley's plan to help small farmers make big money he called to ask him to develop a 100-acre (0.40 km^{2}) PYO corporate farm ecosystem at Domino's Farms, the company's headquarters near Ann Arbor, Michigan. The farm was part of a $300 million 1,500-acre (6.1 km^{2}) project that was to raise fruits, vegetables and herbs, as well as lamb, venison, fish, duck, quail, pheasant, mushrooms, honey, and Christmas trees. The harvest was supplied to Domino's franchises in the Michigan area and to its employees through a Clientele Membership Club.

While many in the agriculture establishment could not relate to Whatley's "the farm as enterprise" philosophy, Monaghan and Whatley were instant comrades. Whatley described the relationship in this manner:

Although the USDA and the land grant college agriculture departments "are pushing diversification, [they are] relying on traditional marketing outlets like farmers markets and cooperatives. That just won't work. Small farmers simply can't afford to pick, grade, wash, package and haul their produce maybe 100 miles or more to market, yet that's exactly what the so-called experts are telling them to do.

Tom Monaghan realized all that immediately. He is no dummy when it comes to marketing. Excellent marketing is what helped him build Domino's Pizza into a $2 billion-a-year business with some 3,800 stores in seven countries. One of the things that he quickly realized during his first year in the pizza business was this: It takes as much time to make a small pizza as it does to make a large one, and it takes just as long to deliver a small pizza. Dropping small pizzas caused an almost immediate 50 percent increase in his sales. Almost the same thing happened when he eliminated submarine sandwiches from his menu."

== Contributions ==
Whatley is among the modern pioneers of sustainable farming. As Jeff Helms wrote of him in 2005 that he was a man 30 years ahead of his time:

Almost 20 years ago, Whatley was writing about U-pick operations, community supported agriculture (CSA), drip irrigation, rabbit husbandry, farmer-owned hunting preserves, kiwi vines, shiitake mushrooms, veneer-grade hardwood stands, on-the-farm bed and breakfasts, direct marketing, organic gardening and goat cheese production. What’s even more astounding is that he was advocating many of these ideas in the 1960s and ’70s.

Throughout his career, Whatley presented practical, positive entrepreneurial options for small farm operators that included production diversification, organic farming practices, farm value-added products and innovative, direct marketing schemes. These sustainable alternatives have grown and flourished over the last two decades, being adopted by USDA and several states. Today, they currently provide important niche markets for small- and medium-sized farmers around the world. However, his fight with the US agriculture establishment was ongoing, as he believed that USDA and land grant colleges continued to push big farm policies on the small farmer who could ill-afford their programs.

Among the several plant varieties that Whatley created, the following are representative:

- Foxxy Lottie grape cultivar (named after Lottie, his second wife);
- Five sweet potato varieties, including the popular yellow-meated Carver sweet potato;
- 15 varieties of muscadine grapes.

== Publications ==
- Booker T. Whatley (1915–2005) and the Editors of New Farm, Booker T. Whatley’s Handbook on How to Make $100,000 Farming 25 acres (100,000 m^{2}): With Special Plans for Prospering on 10 to 200 acres (0.81 km^{2}). Edited by George DeVault. Emmaus, PA: Regenerative Agriculture Association; distributed by Rodale Press, 1987. xi, 180p. This volume is a compilation of lecture materials and the many experiences that Dr. Whatley had with some of his many practitioners, together with previously published articles from 'The New Farm Magazine', 1987.
- "The Plowboy Interview", Mother Earth News, May/June 1982.
