= Farm stay =

A farm stay (or farmstay) is any type of accommodation on a working farm. Some farm stays may be interactive. Some are family-focused and offer children opportunities to feed animals, collect eggs and learn how a farm functions. Others do not allow children. The term "farm stay" can also describe a work exchange agreement, where the guest works a set number of hours per week in exchange for free or affordable accommodation.

Farm stays can be described as agritourism (farmer opening their farm to tourists for any reason, including farm stands and u-pick), ecotourism (Responsible travel to natural areas that conserves the environment and improves the well-being of local people), and geotourism (tourism that sustains or enhances the geographical character of a place—its environment, culture, aesthetics, heritage, and the well-being of its residents).

During the COVID-19 pandemic, farm stays became significantly more popular than previous years, as noted through AirBNB site behavior data.

== Background ==
Farm stays have been a growing trend in Europe since the 1980s, particularly in Italy, where they are called agriturismo. Farm stays are now growing in popularity in other parts of the world as well, especially Australia, Asia, and North America. Reasons for this increasing popularity include farmers' desire for more diverse and dependable income streams and consumers' interest for and to reconnect with rural heritage and the origin of their food supply. The Italian portal of farmhouses or vacationers can use a farm stay to further develop an understanding of the work involved with the supply of their food.

== See also ==
- Guest ranch
- Homestay
- Agritourism
- Community supported agriculture
