= You-Pick =

Type of farm that allows customers to harvest their own crops

A You-Pick ("U-Pick") or Pick-Your-Own (PYO) farm operation is a type of farm gate direct marketing (farm-to-table) strategy where the emphasis is on customers doing the harvesting themselves and agritourism. A PYO farm might be preferred by people who like to select fresh, high quality, vine-ripened produce themselves at lower prices.

== Advantages ==
This strategy has likely been around as long as farmers have grown more than they can sell at wholesale or consume on the farm. U-pick operations serve as an alternative selling method that, depending on the type of produce a farmer grows and the farm's customer base, it can supplement other marketing strategies. This strategy has several advantages:

- Direct sales to the consumer lowers operating costs and brings a profit even if prices may be lower.
- There are no transportation costs and no need for seasonal labor.
- Lower packaging costs because customers are encouraged to bring their own bags, and berry cartons are included in the pricing.
- Income is in hand when the consumer leaves the farm.
- Since customers are allowed and often encouraged to eat while picking, an entry fee usually covers any produce customers may eat. Despite this, the produce at U-pick farms often cost lower since the cost of hiring farmers to harvest the produce is precluded.

== Disadvantages ==
As in any type of direct marketing system, potential customers must be identified. The means of doing this varies, from direct mailings to flyers or print advertising. The level of competition in the area can also dictate the types of crops and services producers provide. Owner-operators must identify the number of similar farmers in the area and the type of crops they produce and services offered, so as not to flood the market. One strategy to avoid this is by planting or harvesting crops at different times or extending the season in greenhouses or hoophouses to help prolong the harvest season and possibly increase the number of customers still looking for locally grown fresh produce. In addition, special services or products can be added to the business operation to gain market share. Some examples are baked and cooked foods, landscape services, plants, flowers, seeds, herbs, and homemade crafts.

Other disadvantages of u-pick marketing are:

- Insurance liability increases.
- The producer has to accept the local price for their produce.
- The producer's workday is extended with managing sales.
- The work week is extended as the weekends require longer hours.
- The producer may not be advantageously located to sell their products.
- Once the local market demand is supplied, the producer has to look to regional markets or sell the produce in a different form: canned, cooked, smoked, or frozen, for example.

== By country ==
=== United States ===
In the United States, U-pick operations are widespread across all 50 states and are commonly integrated with broader seasonal agritourism activities. Typical harvest windows vary by regional climate zone, beginning with strawberries and citrus in the southern states during winter and spring, transitioning to berries and stone fruits in mid-summer, and culminating in apple picking, pumpkin patches, and corn mazes throughout the autumn months.

=== United Kingdom ===
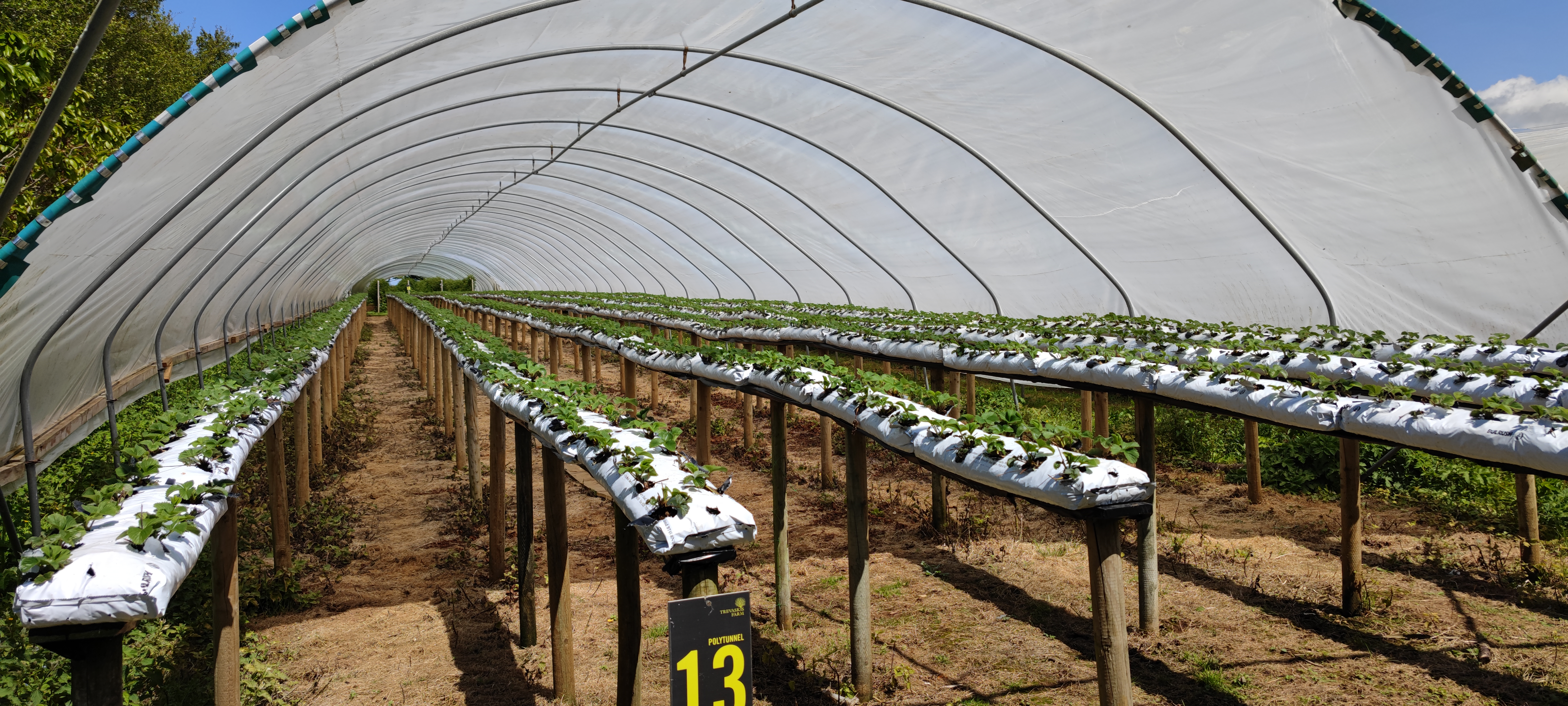
A pick your own site at Trevaskis Farm, Cornwall

In the United Kingdom, customers are encouraged to pick their own, but not consume produce while picking. Sampling is generally allowed while out on the fields, but Pick-Your-Own (PYO) farms charge customers by the weight of produce they have picked. Some PYO farms charge a small refundable deposit on entry to discourage a minority of customers from eating produce without paying. Many farmers still pick for the market, while the public can enjoy themselves in the same fields. PYO was very popular in the 1970s and 1980s, when there was a season for fruit, but has declined in popularity now that the global market can provide the same fruit for most of the year. In the 2000s, there has been a revival in local foods, and PYO has benefited from this. Pick-your-own strawberries were pioneered in the UK by Ted Moult in 1961.

== See also ==
- Agritourism
- Farmers' market
- Booker T. Whatley
