= Stream Cliff Farm =

Herb farm in Indiana

Coordinates: 38°51′54″N 85°37′46″W

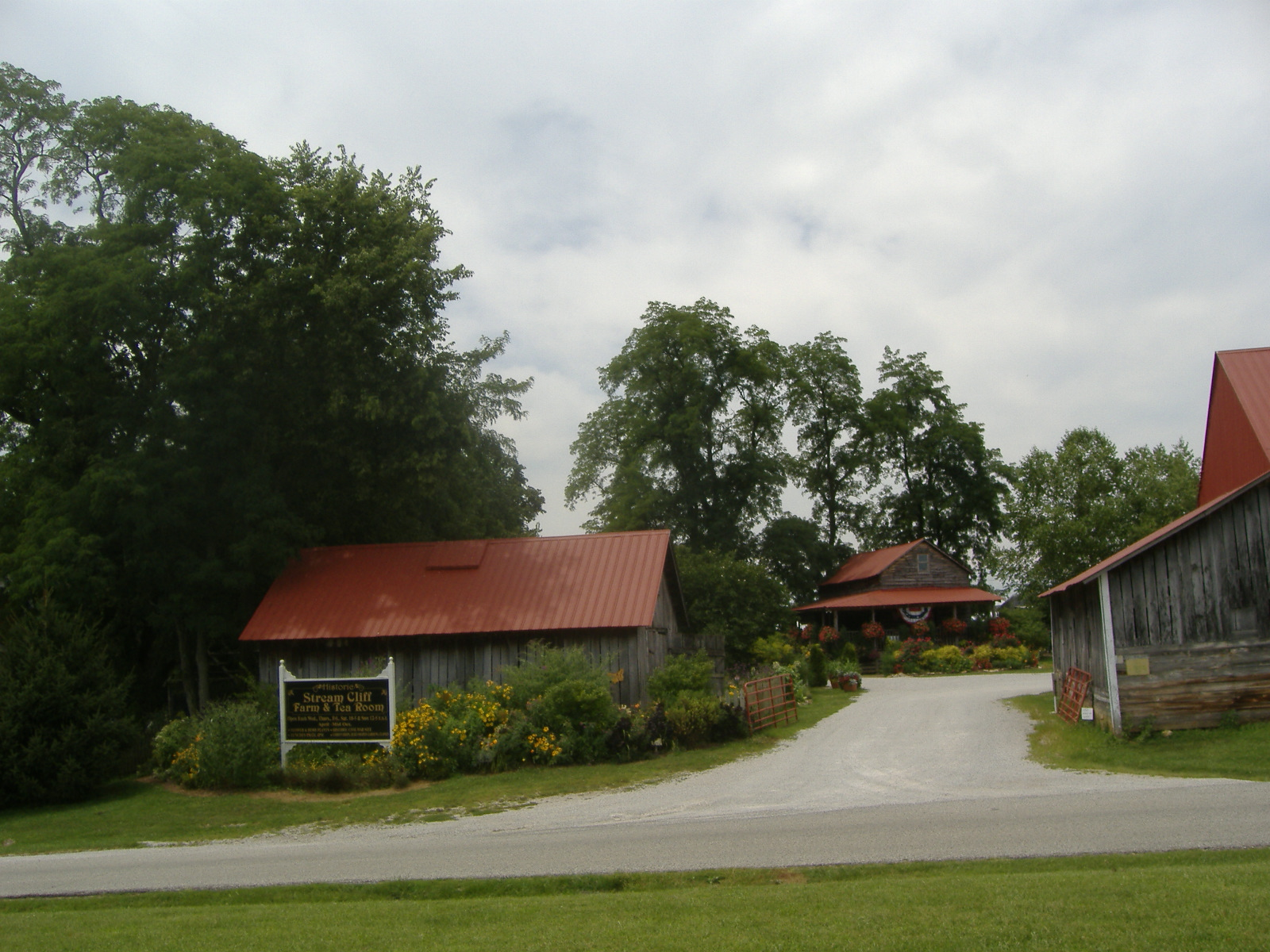
Entrance to Stream Cliff Farm

Stream Cliff Farm, also called the Stream Cliff Herb Farms, is a historic farm located in southern Jennings County, Indiana, USA, near the village of Commiskey. It was visited by John Hunt Morgan during his cavalry march through Indiana on July 11, 1863. As of 2007, it is the oldest herb farm in Indiana. It opens from April to December.

== History ==
James Harmon came to the land in 1821, as it was a land grant owed to his father due to his service in the American Revolutionary War some forty years prior. The brick farmhouse on the property was built in the 1820s or 1830s, and is still used as the family's residence; its builder made the brick for the house himself. The main body of John Hunt Morgan's forces traveled by the farm on July 11, 1863. Afterwards, before 1863 was over, Harmon died and his property went to a local Methodist church. It was from this church that the farm was passed down through five generations to the current owner and her husband. Indiana's John Hunt Morgan Heritage Trail passes by the farm on its west side. The classroom building on the property was built in 1868 to house railroad workers.

The farm has been in the same family for five generations, sometimes passing down the female line. The current owner Betty Manning, whose great-grandfather bought the property, and her husband opened Stream Cliff Farm for visitors for nearly 35 years. Originally, it only sold "handmade crafts", but later switched to focus on herbs and perennials.

== Facilities for visitors ==
Among the facilities at Stream Cliff Farm are a winery, three arts and crafts shops, and a general store. The winery first opened in 2007, and calls its tasting room General Morgan's Tasting Room, after John Hunt Morgan. The impetus to open the winery was due to the owner's husband being told to drink red wine by his cardiologist. There is also a garden for visitors to stroll through. A small restaurant at the place, called the Twigs & Sprigs Tearoom, is a tearoom uses the herbs and edible flowers grown at the farm in each entree, and specializes in soups and sandwiches.

== Gallery ==
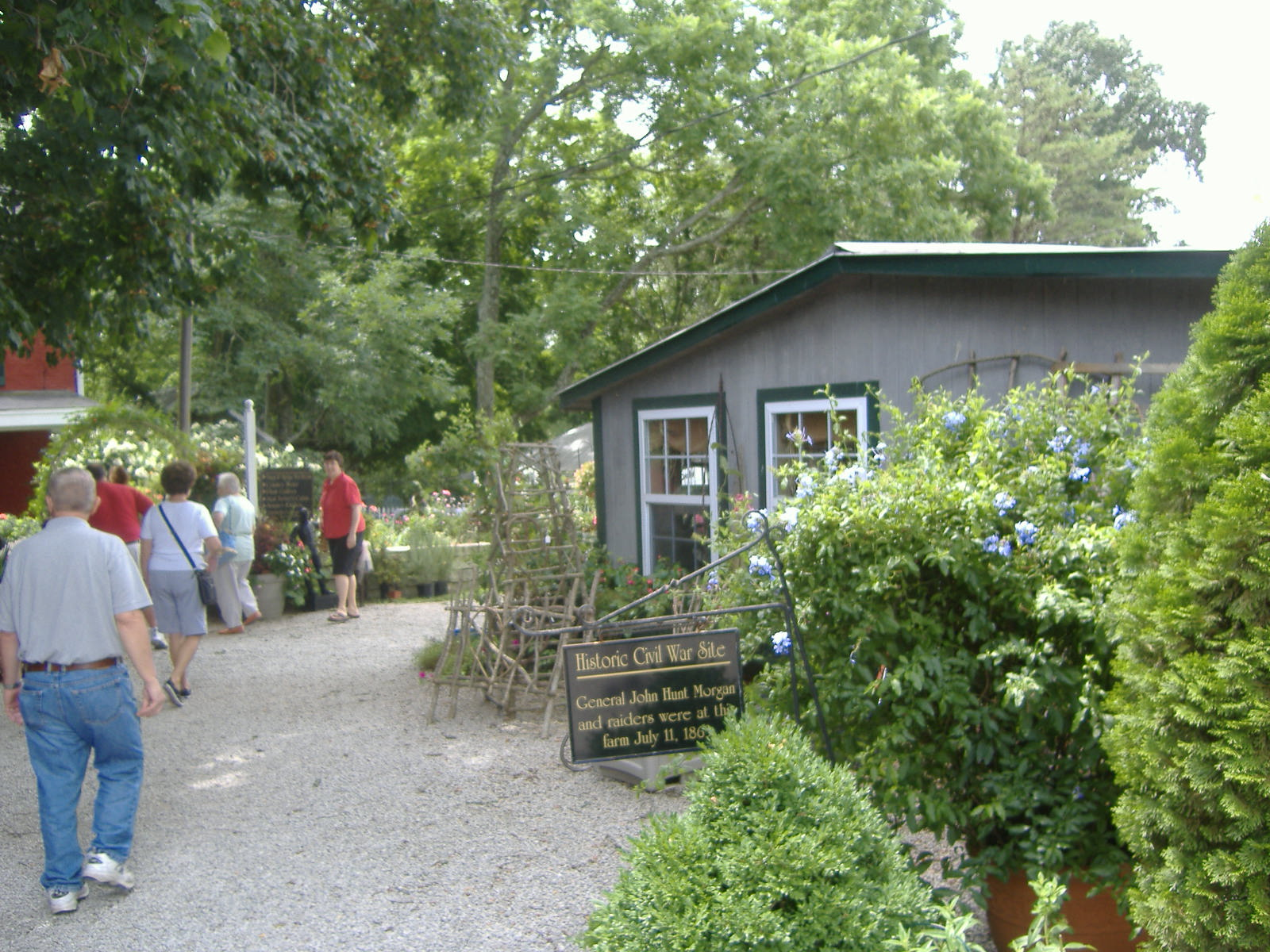
Pathway in the farm

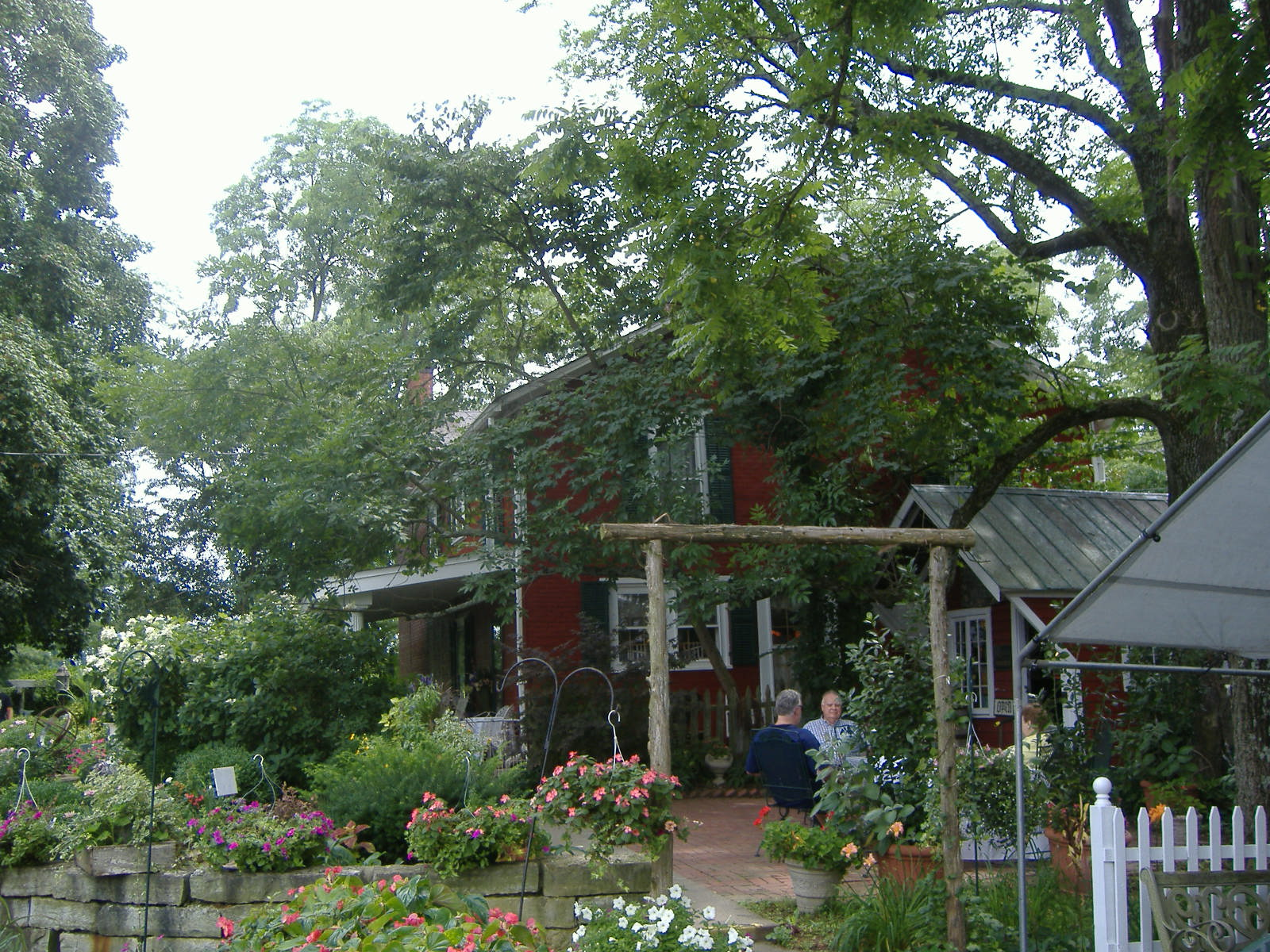
Historic home at the farm

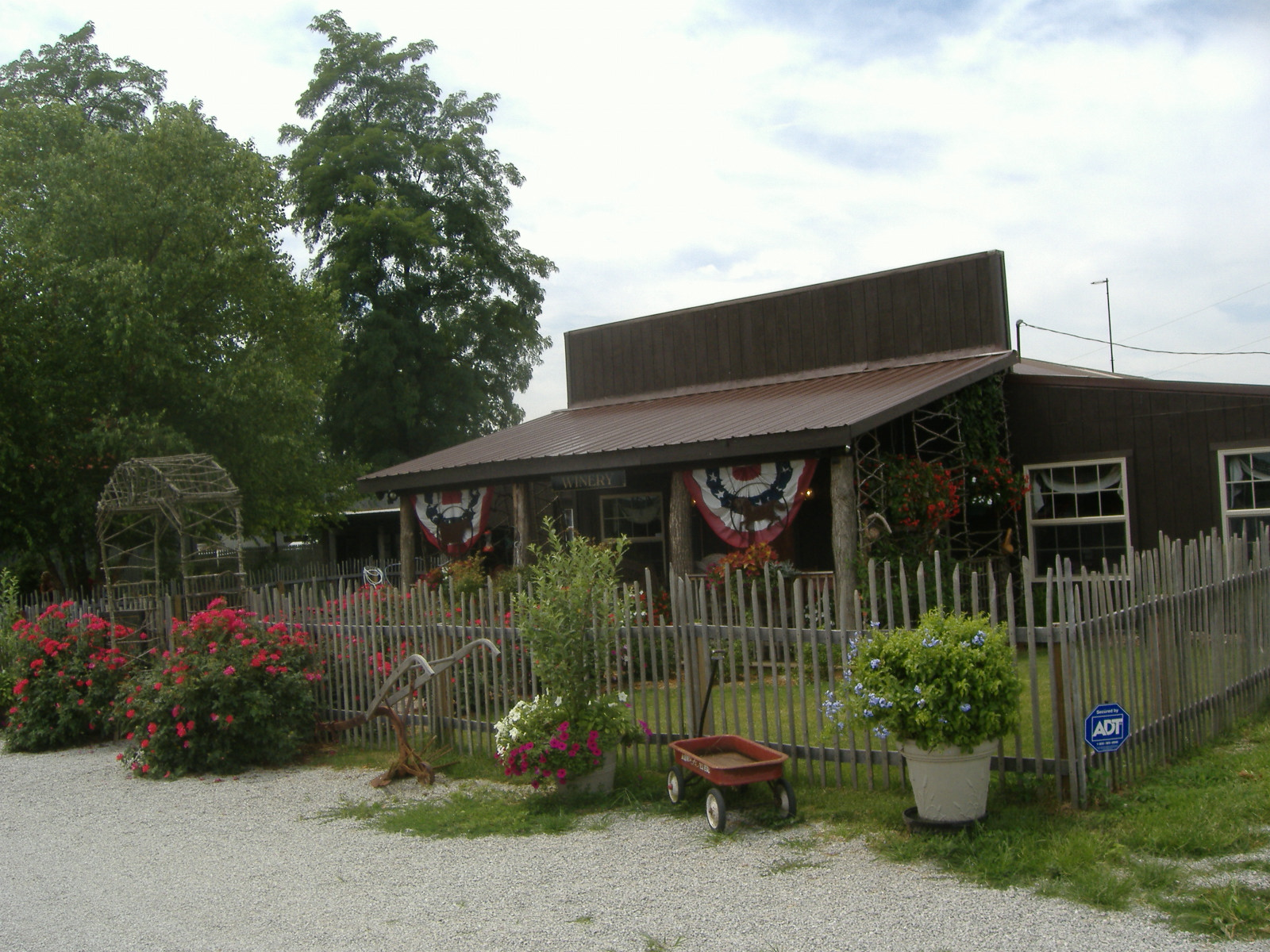
Winery at the farm.
