= List of songs recorded by Phil Ochs =

American singer-songwriter Phil Ochs (December 19, 1940 – April 9, 1976) wrote or recorded at least 238 songs during his brief career. Most of the songs which he performed were his own compositions: they ranged in style from protest songs and topical songs to ballads and folk rock. In concert, Ochs sometimes covered songs made famous by other performers. On one occasion, during the height of Beatlemania in 1964, he and Eric Andersen performed The Beatles' "I Should Have Known Better" at a hootenanny, something Ochs described as "very much out of character with this whole program". In the early part of 1970, Ochs surprised his fans by donning a gold lamé suit (commissioned from Elvis Presley's tailor) and going on tour with a rock band; during the brief concert tour, he sang his own material along with medleys of songs by Buddy Holly, Elvis, and Merle Haggard.

Ochs never had a hit single, but one of his records broke into the charts. "Outside of a Small Circle of Friends" reached No. 20 in Los Angeles and was No. 119 on Billboard's national "Hot Prospect" listing. Joan Baez had a hit in the U.K. with her cover of "There but for Fortune", a song written by Ochs. (In the U.S. it peaked at No. 50 on the Billboard charts—a good showing, but not a hit.)

Ochs' songs, "Bwatue" and "Niko Mchumba Ngombe", which he co-wrote with two African musicians named Dijiba and Bukasa. were written and recorded in Kenya in 1973, and are early examples of blending Western popular music with world music. Critics note that they predate Paul Simon's Graceland album by more than ten years. The lyrics to "Bwatue" are in Lingala, and the lyrics to "Niko Mchumba Ngombe" are in Swahili. The songs were released as a single in Africa, and most Ochs fans never heard of them until they were included on a compilation album in 1997.

This is a list of all songs recorded by Ochs that have been officially released. (Camp Favorites, an album of traditional children's songs that was released anonymously, has not been included.) In the case of studio recordings released during his lifetime, the album title and date of album release have been included. For posthumous releases and demo recordings, the approximate date of recording is shown as well. In the case of live recordings, the date of recording and album on which the track appears have been included. Some recordings have been re-released on compilation albums; their reissue has not been noted.

Except where indicated, all songs were written by Ochs.

== A ==
| Song title | Recordings | Notes |
|---|---|---|
| "All Shook Up" | Live recording: Gunfight at Carnegie Hall (March 27, 1970,) | Written by Otis Blackwell and Elvis Presley. Performed as part of a medley of Elvis Presley songs. |
| "A.M.A. Song" | Demo recording: On My Way (2010, recorded 1963); Studio recording: A Toast to Those Who Are Gone (1986, recorded mid-1960s) | |
| "Another Age" | Studio recording: Rehearsals for Retirement (1969); Live recording: There and Now: Live in Vancouver 1968 (March 13, 1969,) | |
| "Another Country" | Demo recording: The Broadside Tapes 1 (1989, recorded 1963) | |
| "Are You Lonesome Tonight?" | Live recording: Gunfight at Carnegie Hall (March 27, 1970,) | Written by Roy Turk and Lou Handman. Performed as part of a medley of Elvis Presley songs. |
| "Automation Song" | Studio recording: All the News That's Fit to Sing (1964) | |

== B ==
| Song title | Recordings | Notes |
|---|---|---|
| "Bach, Beethoven, Mozart and Me" | Studio recording: Greatest Hits (1970) | About Ochs and his circle of friends. |
| "The Ballad of Alferd Packer" (also titled "The Ballad of Alfred Packer") | Demo recordings: The Broadside Tapes 1 (1989, recorded 1963); On My Way (2010, recorded 1963) | About Alferd Packer, a Rocky Mountain guide who ate the other members of his party. |
| "The Ballad of Billie Sol" | Studio recording: A Toast to Those Who Are Gone (1986, recorded mid-1960s) | About Billie Sol Estes, who was accused of swindling investors, banks, and the federal government of $24 million. |
| "The Ballad of Davey Moore" | | See "Davey Moore" |
| "The Ballad of John Henry Faulk" | Demo recording: The Broadside Tapes 1 (1989, recorded 1962) | About John Henry Faulk, a popular radio show host who fell victim to the blacklist when he was falsely accused of being a Communist. |
| "The Ballad of Medgar Evers" | | See "Too Many Martyrs" |
| "The Ballad of Oxford (Jimmie Meredith)" (also titled "The Ballad of Oxford, Mississippi") | Demo recording: On My Way (2010, recorded 1963); Studio recording: A Toast to Those Who Are Gone (1986, recorded mid-1960s) | About James Meredith, the first African American student to attend the University of Mississippi. |
| "The Ballad of Rubén Jaramillo" | | See "Jaramillo" |
| "The Ballad of U.S. Steel" | Demo recording: On My Way (2010, recorded 1963) | |
| "The Ballad of the Carpenter" | Studio recording: I Ain't Marching Anymore (1965) | Written by Ewan MacColl. |
| "Ballad of William Worthy" | Demo recording: On My Way (2010, recorded 1963); Studio recordings: Broadside Ballads Volume 1 (1963); All the News That's Fit to Sing (1964) | About U.S. journalist William Worthy, who traveled to Cuba despite State Department restrictions. |
| "Basket in the Pool" | Studio recording: Greatest Hits (1970) | About a drunken incident at a party Ochs attended, in which he threw a gift basket into the host's swimming pool. |
| "The Bells" | Studio recording: All the News That's Fit to Sing (1964); Live recording: There and Now: Live in Vancouver 1968 (March 13, 1969,); Amchitka, The 1970 Concert That Launched Greenpeace (October 16, 1970,) | Lyrics adapted from the poem by Edgar Allan Poe. The 1969 live recording features Allen Ginsberg on bells. |
| "Bobby Dylan Record" | Demo recording: On My Way (2010, recorded 1963) | |
| "Bound for Glory" | Studio recording: All the News That's Fit to Sing (1964) | About U.S. folk singer Woody Guthrie. |
| "Boy in Ohio" | Studio recording: Greatest Hits (1970) | About Ochs's childhood in Columbus, Ohio. |
| "Bracero" | Live recording: Phil Ochs in Concert (1966) | About Mexican migrant workers under the Bracero Program. |
| "Bullets of Mexico" | | See "Jaramillo" |
| "Bwatue" | Studio recording: Single (1973) | Written by Ochs, Dijiba, and Bukasa. |

== C ==
| Song title | Recordings | Notes |
|---|---|---|
| "Canons of Christianity" (also titled "Cannons of Christianity") | Live recording: Phil Ochs in Concert (1966) | |
| "Celia" | Studio recording: All the News That's Fit to Sing (1964) | A love song inspired by William J. Pomeroy and Celia Mariano, a married couple who were imprisoned in the Philippines. |
| "Changes" | Demo recording: Sings for Broadside (1976, recorded 1965); Live recordings: Phil Ochs in Concert (1966); There and Now: Live in Vancouver 1968 (March 13, 1969); Amchitka, The 1970 Concert That Launched Greenpeace (October 16, 1970) | Inspired by Ochs's separation from his wife. |
| "Changing Hands" | Demo recording: Broadside Reunion (1972, recorded 1963) | |
| "Chords of Fame" | Studio recording: Greatest Hits (1970); Live recordings: Gunfight at Carnegie Hall (March 27, 1970,); Amchitka, The 1970 Concert That Launched Greenpeace (October 16, 1970,) | |
| "Christine Keeler" | Demo recording: The Broadside Tapes 1 (1989, recorded 1963) | About Christine Keeler and Mandy Rice-Davies, two women at the heart of the Profumo affair. |
| "City Boy" | Studio recording: A Toast to Those Who Are Gone (1986, recorded mid-1960s) | |
| "Colored Town" | Studio recording: A Toast to Those Who Are Gone (1986, recorded mid-1960s) | |
| "The Confession" | Demo recording: Farewells & Fantasies (1997, recorded 1964) | |
| "Cops of the World" | Live recording: Phil Ochs in Concert (1966) | About U.S. intervention in the affairs of foreign countries. |
| "Cross My Heart" | Demo recording: Farewells & Fantasies (1997, recorded 1966); Studio recording: Pleasures of the Harbor (1967); Live recordings: Live at Newport (July 1966) | The studio version was released as a single in 1967. |
| "Crucifixion" | Studio recording: Pleasures of the Harbor (1967); Live recordings: There and Now: Live in Vancouver 1968 (March 13, 1969,); Chords of Fame (March 27, 1970,); Sings for Broadside (October 12, 1974,) | About the rise and fall of a hero, and the public's role in creating, destroying, and deifying its heroes. The song usually is interpreted as an allegory likening the life and assassination of U.S. President John F. Kennedy to the career of Jesus, although the song may refer to other heroes as well. |

== D ==
| Song title | Recordings | Notes |
|---|---|---|
| "Davey Moore" (also titled "The Ballad of Davey Moore") | Demo recording: On My Way (2010, recorded 1963); Studio recording: The Early Years (2000, recorded 1964) | About Davey Moore, a boxer who died as a result of injuries sustained during a match. |
| "Days of Decision" | Demo recording: Sings for Broadside (1976, recorded 1964); Studio recording: I Ain't Marching Anymore (1965) | |
| "Doesn't Lenny Live Here Anymore?" | Studio recording: Rehearsals for Retirement (1969) | |
| "The Doll House" | Studio recording: Rehearsals for Retirement (1969); Live recording: There and Now: Live in Vancouver 1968 (March 13, 1969,) | |
| "Don't Try Again" | Demo recording: On My Way (2010, recorded 1963) | |
| "Do What I Have to Do" | Studio recording: A Toast to Those Who Are Gone (1986, recorded mid-1960s); Live recording: Sing for Freedom (May 1964) | Written in May 1964 at a Freedom Song workshop at Gammon Theological Seminary in Atlanta, Georgia. |
| "Draft Dodger Rag" | Studio recording: I Ain't Marching Anymore (1965); Live recording: Evening Concerts Volume 1 (July 1964) | |

== E ==
| Song title | Recordings | Notes |
|---|---|---|
| "Everyday" | Live recording: Gunfight at Carnegie Hall (March 27, 1970,) | Written by Norman Petty and Charles Hardin. Performed as part of a medley of Buddy Holly songs. |

== F ==
| Song title | Recordings | Notes |
|---|---|---|
| "First Snow" | Demo recording: On My Way (2010, recorded 1963) | |
| "The Floods of Florence" | Studio recording: Tape from California (1968) | |
| "Flower Lady" | Studio recording: Pleasures of the Harbor (1967) | |
| "A Fool Such as I" | Live recording: Gunfight at Carnegie Hall (March 27, 1970,) | Written by Bill Trader. |

== G ==
| Song title | Recordings | Notes |
|---|---|---|
| "Gas Station Women" | Studio recording: Greatest Hits (1970) | |
| "Going Down to Mississippi" | Studio recording: A Toast to Those Who Are Gone (1986, recorded mid-1960s) | |

== H ==
| Song title | Recordings | Notes |
|---|---|---|
| "Half a Century High" | Studio recording: Tape from California (1968); Live recording: Live at Newport (July 1966) | |
| "The Harder They Fall" | Studio recordings: Tape from California (1968); B-side of "The War Is Over" single (1968) | The single version of "The Harder They Fall" has never been included on any album or compilation. |
| "Hazard, Kentucky" | Demo recordings: The Broadside Tapes 1 (1989, recorded 1963); On My Way (2010, recorded 1963) | About the poor work and living conditions of coal workers in Kentucky. |
| "Heartbreak Hotel" | Live recording: Gunfight at Carnegie Hall (March 27, 1970,) | Written by Thomas Durden, Elvis Presley, and Mae Boren Axton. Performed as part of a medley of Elvis Presley songs. |
| "Here's to the State of Mississippi" | Studio recording: I Ain't Marching Anymore (1965) | Inspired by the murders of Chaney, Goodman, and Schwerner in Mississippi during 1964. |
| "Here's to the State of Richard Nixon" | Live recording: B-side of "Power and the Glory" single (January 17, 1974,) | Recorded at Max's Kansas City in New York City. A revised version of "Here's to the State of Mississippi", with lyrics updated to refer to U.S. President Richard Nixon. |
| "The Highwayman" | Studio recording: I Ain't Marching Anymore (1965); Live recording: There and Now: Live in Vancouver 1968 (March 13, 1969,) | Lyrics adapted from the poem by Alfred Noyes. |
| "The Hills of West Virginia" | Studio recordings: I Ain't Marching Anymore (1965) | |
| "How Long" | Demo recording: On My Way (2010, recorded 1963); Studio recording: The Early Years (2000, recorded 1964) | |
| "Hunger and Cold" | Demo recording: Broadside Reunion (1972, recorded 1963) | |

== I ==
| Song title | Recordings | Notes |
|---|---|---|
| "I Ain't Marching Anymore" | Studio recordings: I Ain't Marching Anymore (1965); Single (1966); Live recordings: Live at Newport (July 1964); There and Now: Live in Vancouver 1968 (March 13, 1969,); Gunfight at Carnegie Hall (March 27, 1970,); Amchitka, The 1970 Concert That Launched Greenpeace (October 16, 1970,) | An anti-war song that became a 1960s protest anthem. The 1966 single was a folk-rock version of the song that included accompaniment by The Blues Project and a bagpipe player. |
| "If I Knew" | Demo recording: The Broadside Tapes 1 (1989, recorded 1962) | |
| "I Kill Therefore I Am" | Studio recording: Rehearsals for Retirement (1969); Live recordings: There and Now: Live in Vancouver 1968 (March 13, 1969,) | |
| "I'll Be There" | Demo recording: On My Way (2010, recorded 1963); Studio recording: A Toast to Those Who Are Gone (1986, recorded mid-1960s) | |
| "I'm Going to Say It Now" | Live recordings: Phil Ochs in Concert (1966); Amchitka, The 1970 Concert That Launched Greenpeace (October 16, 1970,); Sings for Broadside (October 12, 1974,) | About student activism in the U.S., particularly the Free Speech Movement. |
| "I'm Gonna Love You Too" | Live recording: Gunfight at Carnegie Hall (March 27, 1970,) | Written by Joe B. Mauldin, Niki Sullivan, and Norman Petty. Performed as part of a medley of Buddy Holly songs. |
| "I'm Tired" | Studio recording: A Toast to Those Who Are Gone (1986, recorded mid-1960s) | |
| "In the Heat of the Summer" | Studio recording: I Ain't Marching Anymore (1965) | About urban riots, particularly the Harlem riot of 1964. |
| "The Iron Lady" | Studio recording: I Ain't Marching Anymore (1965) | About the death penalty. |
| "I Should Have Known Better" | Live recording: The Broadside Tapes 1 (November 1, 1964,) | Written by John Lennon and Paul McCartney. Performed with Eric Andersen. |
| "Is There Anybody Here" | Live recordings: Phil Ochs in Concert (1966); Live at Newport (July 1966) | |
| "I've Had Her" | Studio recording: Pleasures of the Harbor (1967) | |

== J ==
| Song title | Recordings | Notes |
|---|---|---|
| "Jaramillo" (also titled "The Ballad of Rubén Jaramillo" and "Bullets of Mexico") | Demo recording: On My Way (2010, recorded 1963); Studio recording: All the News That's Fit to Sing (1964) | About Mexican revolutionary Rubén Jaramillo. |
| "Jim Dean of Indiana" | Studio recording: Greatest Hits (1970) | About actor James Dean. |
| "Joe Hill" | Studio recording: Tape from California (1968); Live recording: Amchitka, The 1970 Concert That Launched Greenpeace (October 16, 1970,) | About labor activist and songwriter Joe Hill. |

== K ==
| Song title | Recordings | Notes |
|---|---|---|
| "Kansas City Bomber" | Studio recording: Single (1973) | Written as the theme song for the film Kansas City Bomber, although it was not used in the soundtrack. |
| "Knock on the Door" | Studio recording: All the News That's Fit to Sing (1964) | |

== L ==
| Song title | Recordings | Notes |
|---|---|---|
| "Links on the Chain" | Studio recordings: Broadside Ballads Volume 3 (1964); I Ain't Marching Anymore (1965); Live recording: Live at Newport (July 1964) | About the relationship between the labor movement and the Civil Rights Movement. The 1964 studio recording is credited to the Broadside Singers; Ochs sings lead. |
| "Lou Marsh" | Demo recording: On My Way (2010, recorded 1963); Studio recording: All the News That's Fit to Sing (1964) | About Lou Marsh, a social worker and former Yale Divinity School student who died trying to prevent a gang war in New York City. |
| "Love Me, I'm a Liberal" | Live recording: Phil Ochs in Concert (1966) | |

== M ==
| Song title | Recordings | Notes |
|---|---|---|
| "The Marines Have Landed on the Shores of Santo Domingo" | | See "Santo Domingo" |
| "The Men Behind the Guns" | Studio recording: I Ain't Marching Anymore (1965) | Lyrics adapted from the poem by John Rooney. |
| "Miranda" | Studio recording: Pleasures of the Harbor (1967) | |
| "Mona Lisa" | Live recording: Gunfight at Carnegie Hall (March 27, 1970,) | Written by Ray Evans and Jay Livingston. |
| "Morning" | Demo recording: On My Way (2010, recorded 1963); Live recording: Farewells & Fantasies (May 1966) | Live recording from Bob Fass's radio program on WBAI in New York City. |
| "My Baby Left Me" | Live recording: Gunfight at Carnegie Hall (March 27, 1970,) | Written by Arthur Crudup. Performed as part of a medley of Elvis Presley songs. |
| "My Kingdom for a Car" | Studio recording: Greatest Hits (1970) | |
| "My Life" | Studio recording: Rehearsals for Retirement (1969) | |

== N ==
| Song title | Recordings | Notes |
|---|---|---|
| "Never Again" | Demo recording: On My Way (2010, recorded 1963) | |
| "New Town" | Demo recording: On My Way (2010, recorded 1963) | |
| "Niko Mchumba Ngombe" | Studio recording: B-side of "Bwatue" single (1973) | Written by Ochs, Dijiba, and Bukasa. |
| "No Christmas in Kentucky" | Studio recording: A Toast to Those Who Are Gone (1986, recorded mid-1960s) | About coal miners and their families. |
| "No More Songs" | Studio recording: Greatest Hits (1970); Live recording: Amchitka, The 1970 Concert That Launched Greenpeace (October 16, 1970,) | The studio recording was the last song on the last studio album released during Ochs's lifetime. |
| "Not Fade Away" | Live recording: Gunfight at Carnegie Hall (March 27, 1970,) | Written by Charles Hardin and Norman Petty. Performed as part of a medley of Buddy Holly songs. |

== O ==
| Song title | Recordings | Notes |
|---|---|---|
| "Oh, Boy!" | Live recording: Gunfight at Carnegie Hall (March 27, 1970,) | Written by Sonny West, Bill Tilghman, and Norman Petty. Performed as part of a medley of Buddy Holly songs. |
| "Okie from Muskogee" | Live recording: Gunfight at Carnegie Hall (March 27, 1970,) | Written by Roy Burris and Merle Haggard. |
| "Once I Lived the Life of a Commissar" | Demo recording: On My Way (2010, recorded 1963) | Music based on "Nobody Knows You When You're Down and Out". |
| "One More Parade" | Studio recording: All the News That's Fit to Sing (1964) | Written by Ochs and Bob Gibson. |
| "One Way Ticket Home" | Studio recording: Greatest Hits (1970) | |
| "On Her Hand a Golden Ring" | Demo recording: Sings for Broadside (1976, recorded 1963) | About the bombing of the 16th Street Baptist Church in Birmingham, Alabama, which killed four girls. |
| "On My Way" | Demo recordings: The Broadside Tapes 1 (1989, recorded 1963); On My Way (2010, recorded 1963) | |
| "Outside of a Small Circle of Friends" | Studio recording: Pleasures of the Harbor (1967); Live recordings: There and Now: Live in Vancouver 1968 (March 13, 1969,); Sings for Broadside (October 12, 1974,) | Inspired by the case of Kitty Genovese, who was stabbed to death outside her home while dozens of her neighbors reportedly ignored her cries for help. The studio version was released as a single in 1967. The song's reference to marijuana led A&M to release two alternate versions of the single. |

== P ==
| Song title | Recordings | Notes |
|---|---|---|
| "The Party" | Studio recording: Pleasures of the Harbor (1967); Live recording: Live at Newport (July 1966) | |
| "The Passing of My Life" | Demo recording: The Broadside Tapes 1 (1989, recorded 1963) | |
| "Paul Crump" | Demo recording: On My Way (2010, recorded 1963); Studio recordings: New Folks Volume 2 (1964); A Toast to Those Who Are Gone (1986, recorded 1964) | About Paul Crump, a death row prisoner whose sentence was commuted. |
| "Pleasures of the Harbor" | Studio recording: Pleasures of the Harbor (1967); Live recordings: Live at Newport (July 1966); There and Now: Live in Vancouver 1968 (March 13, 1969,); Gunfight at Carnegie Hall (March 27, 1970,); Sings for Broadside (October 12, 1974,) | Inspired by the John Wayne film The Long Voyage Home. |
| "Power and the Glory" | Demo recording: On My Way (2010, recorded 1963); Studio recordings: All the News That's Fit to Sing (1964); Single (1974); Live recording: July 1963 (Evening Concerts Volume 1) | An American patriotic anthem. On the 1974 single, Ochs was accompanied by a fife and drum corps. |
| "Pretty Smart on My Part" | Studio recording: Rehearsals for Retirement (1969) | |

== R ==
| Song title | Recordings | Notes |
|---|---|---|
| "Ready Teddy" | Live recording: Gunfight at Carnegie Hall (March 27, 1970,) | Written by Robert Blackwell and John Marascalco. Performed as part of a medley of Elvis Presley songs. |
| "Rehearsals for Retirement" | Studio recording: Rehearsals for Retirement (1969) | |
| "Remember Me" | Demo recording: The Broadside Tapes 1 (1989, recorded 1963) | |
| "Ringing of Revolution" (also titled "Rhythms of Revolution") | Demo recording: Sings for Broadside (1976, recorded 1963); Live recordings: Phil Ochs in Concert (1966); Amchitka, The 1970 Concert That Launched Greenpeace (October 16, 1970,) | |
| "Rivers of the Blood" | Demo recording: The Broadside Tapes 1 (1989, recorded 1963) | |

== S ==
| Song title | Recordings | Notes |
|---|---|---|
| "Santo Domingo" | Live recordings: Phil Ochs in Concert (1966); Sings for Broadside (October 12, 1974,) | Inspired by the U.S. invasion of the Dominican Republic during April 1965. |
| "Say What I Have to Say" | | See "Do What I Have to Do" |
| "School Days" | Live recording: American Troubadour (March 27, 1970,) | Written by Chuck Berry. |
| "The Scorpion Departs But Never Returns" | Studio recording: Rehearsals for Retirement (1969); Live recording: There and Now: Live in Vancouver 1968 (March 13, 1969,) | Inspired by the disappearance of the USS Scorpion (SSN-589), a nuclear-powered attack submarine that disappeared at sea during May 1968. |
| "Song of a Soldier" | Demo recording: Farewells & Fantasies (1997, recorded 1964) | |
| "Song of My Returning" | Studio recording: A Toast to Those Who Are Gone (1986, recorded mid-1960s) | |
| "Spaceman" | Demo recording: The Broadside Tapes 1 (1989, recorded 1963) | |
| "Spanish Civil War Song" (also titled "Spanish Lament") | Demo recordings: The Broadside Tapes 1 (1989, recorded 1963); On My Way (2010, recorded 1963) | |

== T ==
| Song title | Recordings | Notes |
|---|---|---|
| "Talkin' Cuban Crisis" | Demo recording: On My Way (2010, recorded 1963); Studio recording: All the News That's Fit to Sing (1964) | About the Cuban Missile Crisis, a confrontation between the United States, the Soviet Union, and Cuba in October 1962. |
| "Talking Airplane Disaster" | Demo recording: On My Way (2010, recorded 1963); Studio recording: New Folks Volume 2 (1964) | |
| "Talking Birmingham Jam" | Studio recording: I Ain't Marching Anymore (1965); Live recording: Newport Broadside (July 1963) | About the Birmingham campaign during the Civil Rights Movement. |
| "Talkin' Pay TV" | Demo recording: The Broadside Tapes 1 (1989, recorded 1963) | Inspired by cable television. |
| "Talkin' Vietnam" (also titled "Talking Vietnam Blues") | Studio recording: All the News That's Fit to Sing (1964); Live recording: July 1964 (Live at Newport) | About the growing involvement of the U.S. in the Vietnam War. |
| "Tape from California" | Studio recording: Tape from California (1968); Live recording: Gunfight at Carnegie Hall (March 27, 1970,) | |
| "Ten Cents a Coup" | Live recording: Greatest Hits (1969) | About U.S. President Richard Nixon and Vice President Spiro Agnew. |
| "That's the Way It's Gonna Be" | Demo recording: The Broadside Tapes 1 (1989, recorded 1963) | |
| "That's What I Want to Hear" | Demo recording: Sings for Broadside (1976, recorded 1962); Studio recording: I Ain't Marching Anymore (1965) | |
| "That Was the President" | Studio recording: I Ain't Marching Anymore (1965) | About the life and assassination of U.S. President John F. Kennedy. |
| "There but for Fortune" | Studio recording: New Folks Volume 2 (1964); Live recordings: Phil Ochs in Concert (1966); There and Now: Live in Vancouver 1968 (March 13, 1969,) | |
| "Think It Over" | Live recording: Gunfight at Carnegie Hall (March 27, 1970,) | Written by Buddy Holly, Norman Petty, and Jerry Allison. Performed as part of a medley of Buddy Holly songs. |
| "The Thresher" | Studio recording: All the News That's Fit to Sing (1964) | About the USS Thresher (SSN-593), a nuclear-powered attack submarine that sank by accident on April 10, 1963,. |
| "Time Was" | Demo recordings: The Broadside Tapes 1 (1989, recorded 1962); On My Way (2010, recorded 1963) | |
| "A Toast to Those Who Are Gone" | Studio recording: A Toast to Those Who Are Gone (1986, recorded mid-1960s) | |
| "Too Many Martyrs" (also titled "The Ballad of Medgar Evers") | Studio recording: All the News That's Fit to Sing (1964); Live recordings: Newport Broadside (July 1963) | Written by Ochs and Bob Gibson. About the assassination of NAACP leader Medgar Evers on June 12, 1963. |
| "The Trial" | Studio recording: A Toast to Those Who Are Gone (1986, recorded mid-1960s) | |

== U ==
| Song title | Recordings | Notes |
|---|---|---|
| "United Fruit" | Demo recording: Sings for Broadside (1976, recorded 1963) | |

== W ==
| Song title | Recordings | Notes |
|---|---|---|
| "The War Is Over" | Studio recording: Tape from California (1968) | A cynical anti-Vietnam War song. |
| "We Seek No Wider War" | Demo recording: Farewells & Fantasies (1997, recorded 1965) | About the role of the U.S. in the Vietnam War. |
| "What Are You Fighting For?" | Demo recording: Sings for Broadside (1976, recorded 1963); Studio recording: New Folks Volume 2 (1964) | |
| "What's That I Hear" | Studio recording: All the News That's Fit to Sing (1964) | |
| "When In Rome" | Studio recording: Tape From California (1968) | |
| "When I'm Gone" | Live recording: Phil Ochs in Concert (1966) | |
| "Where Were You in Chicago?" | Studio recording: Rehearsals for Retirement (1969); Live recording: There and Now: Live in Vancouver 1968 (March 13, 1969,) | Inspired by the police riot that broke up protests during the 1968 Democratic National Convention in Chicago. Sometimes considered part of "William Butler Yeats Visits Lincoln Park and Escapes Unscathed". |
| "White Boots Marching in a Yellow Land" | Studio recording: Tape from California (1968) | About the role of the U.S. in the Vietnam War. |
| "William Butler Yeats Visits Lincoln Park and Escapes Unscathed" | Studio recording: Rehearsals for Retirement (1969); Live recording: There and Now: Live in Vancouver 1968 (March 13, 1969,) | Inspired by the police riot that broke up protests during the 1968 Democratic National Convention in Chicago. |
| "William Moore" | Studio recordings: New Folks Volume 2 (1964); A Toast to Those Who Are Gone (1986, recorded 1964) | About William Moore, a postal worker who staged lone civil rights protests. |
| "The World Began in Eden and Ended in Los Angeles" | Studio recording: Rehearsals for Retirement (1969); Live recording: There and Now: Live in Vancouver 1968 (March 13, 1969,) | |

== See also ==
- Phil Ochs discography
