= Phil Ochs discography =

- Phil Ochs in concert, May 25, 1973
- Studio albums: 7
- Live albums: 6
- Compilation albums: 6
- Singles: 9
- B-sides: 10
- Box sets: 1
- Other albums: 6

The discography of Phil Ochs, a U.S. protest singer and songwriter, consists of seven studio albums, six live albums, six compilation albums, one box set, six other albums, and nine singles.

Ochs released eight albums under his own name during his lifetime. Since his suicide in 1976, fifteen additional albums have been released, including six compilations and one box set.

Ochs's albums received critical attention but little commercial success. His best-selling album was Pleasures of the Harbor.

== Albums ==
=== Studio albums ===
Released	Title	Label	Peak Billboard chart position
April 1964	All the News That's Fit to Sing	Elektra	—
February 1965	I Ain't Marching Anymore	Elektra	—
November 1967	Pleasures of the Harbor	A&M	168
May 1968	Tape from California	A&M	—
April 1969	Rehearsals for Retirement	A&M	167
February 1970	Greatest Hits	A&M	194

=== Live albums ===
Released	Title	Label	Peak Billboard chart position
March 1966	Phil Ochs in Concert	Elektra	150
1974	Gunfight at Carnegie Hall^{[I]}	A&M Canada	—
January 1991	There and Now: Live in Vancouver 1968	Rhino	—
1996	Live at Newport	Vanguard	—
2009	Amchitka, The 1970 Concert That Launched Greenpeace	Greenpeace	—
July 2014	Live Again!	RockBeat	—
May 5, 2017	Live in Montreal 10/22/66	RockBeat	—

- IGunfight at Carnegie Hall was released only in Canada.

=== Compilation albums ===
Released	Title	Label	Peak Billboard chart position
August 1976	Chords of Fame	A&M	210
June 1986	A Toast to Those Who Are Gone	Rhino	—
1988	The War Is Over: The Best of Phil Ochs	A&M	—
1989	There but for Fortune	Elektra	—
July 1997	American Troubadour^{[II]}	A&M	—
January 2002	20th Century Masters: The Millennium Collection: The Best of Phil Ochs	A&M	—
2004	Cross My Heart: An Introduction to Phil Ochs	A&M	—

- IIAmerican Troubadour was released only in the U.K.

=== Other albums ===
Released	Title	Label	Peak Billboard chart position
1962 or 1963	The Campers: Camp Favorites^{[III]}	Cameo	—
1976	Sings for Broadside^{[IV]}	Folkways	—
1976	Interviews with Phil Ochs^{[V]}	Folkways	—
1989	The Broadside Tapes 1^{[VI]}	Smithsonian Folkways	—
June 2000	The Early Years^{[VII]}	Vanguard	—
June 22, 2010	On My Way^{[VIII]}	Micro Werks	—

- IIICamp Favorites was released by "The Campers", who consist of Phil Ochs (who is not credited on the record), an unknown female vocalist, and a group of young singers, accompanied by Dick Weissman on banjo.
- IVSings for Broadside consists of demo recordings and live recordings.
- VInterviews with Phil Ochs consists of an interview with Phil Ochs.
- VIThe Broadside Tapes 1 consists of demo recordings and a live recording.
- VIIThe Early Years consists of studio recordings and live recordings.
- VIIIOn My Way consists of demo recordings made for Roy Connors of The Highwaymen in 1963.

=== Box sets ===
Released	Title	Label	Peak Billboard chart position
August 1997	Farewells & Fantasies	Rhino	—

== Singles ==
Year	Title	Album	Label
1966	"I Ain't Marching Anymore"^{[VIII]}	Non-album version	Elektra
1967	"Cross My Heart"	Pleasures of the Harbor	A&M
1967	"Outside of a Small Circle of Friends"	Pleasures of the Harbor	A&M
1968	"The War Is Over"	Tape from California	A&M
1969	"My Life"	Rehearsals for Retirement	A&M
1972	"One Way Ticket Home"	Greatest Hits	A&M
1973	"Kansas City Bomber"	Non-album single	A&M
1973	"Bwatue"^{[IX]}	Non-album single	A&M
1974	"Power and the Glory"	Non-album version	A&M

- VIII"I Ain't Marching Anymore" was released as a single in the U.K. and as a flexi disc in Sing Out! magazine.
- IX"Bwatue" was released only in Africa.

=== B-sides ===
Year	A-side	B-side	Album
1966	"I Ain't Marching Anymore"	"That Was the President"	I Ain't Marching Anymore
1967	"Cross My Heart"	"Flower Lady"	Pleasures of the Harbor
1967	"Outside of a Small Circle of Friends"	"Miranda"	Pleasures of the Harbor
1967	"Outside of a Small Circle of Friends"	"Outside of a Small Circle of Friends"^{[X]}	Pleasures of the Harbor
1968	"The War Is Over"	"The Harder They Fall"^{[XI]}	Non-album version
1969	"My Life"	"The World Began in Eden and Ended in Los Angeles"	Rehearsals for Retirement
1972	"One-Way Ticket Home"	"My Kingdom for a Car"	Greatest Hits
1973	"Kansas City Bomber"	"Gas Station Women"	Greatest Hits
1973	"Bwatue"	"Niko Mchumba Ngombe"	Non-album single
1974	"Power and the Glory"	"Here's to the State of Richard Nixon"	Non-album single

- X"Outside of a Small Circle of Friends" was edited for radio play.
- XIThe single version of "The Harder They Fall" has never been included on any album or compilation.

== See also ==
- List of songs recorded by Phil Ochs
