= Chords of Fame =

Compilation album by Phil Ochs
- Released: 1976
- Genre: Folk
- Label: A&M

Phil Ochs chronology
Gunfight at Carnegie Hall (1975)	Chords of Fame (1976)	Sings for Broadside (1976)

Professional ratings
Review scores
Source	Rating
AllMusic	4.5/5 stars

Chords of Fame is a two-LP compilation from American folk singer Phil Ochs, compiled by his brother Michael Ochs shortly after Phil's death and released in 1976 on A&M Records. With the exception of 1969's Rehearsals for Retirement, all studio albums are represented, as well as a number of live releases.

The compilation also included several rarities not previously available on an album:

- An electric version of "I Ain't Marching Anymore", released as a single in the UK in 1966.
- Both sides of a 1974 single:
  - "Power and the Glory", recorded with a fife and drum corps.
  - "Here's to the State of Richard Nixon", a revision of "Here's to the State of Mississippi", taped live at Max's Kansas City.
- An acoustic version of "Crucifixion" recorded at Carnegie Hall on March 27, 1970, at the show that had produced Gunfight at Carnegie Hall.

Notably, Chords of Fame compiled tracks Ochs had recorded for both A&M and Elektra Records. With the exception of the 1997 box set Farewells & Fantasies, the album marked the last time Ochs' Elektra material would be released on A&M, or vice versa.

Ed Sanders wrote the liner notes, which were printed on the back of the album.

== Track listing ==
All music is composed by Phil Ochs unless otherwise noted.

Side one
No.	Title	Writer(s)	Length
1.	"I Ain't Marching Anymore"		2:47
2.	"One More Parade"	Ochs, Bob Gibson	3:00
3.	"Draft Dodger Rag"		2:07
4.	"Here's to the State of Richard Nixon"		2:19
5.	"The Bells"	Edgar Allan Poe with musical interpretation by Ochs	3:00
6.	"Bound for Glory"		3:15
7.	"Too Many Martyrs (Ochs, Gibson)"	Ochs, Gibson	2:46
8.	"There But for Fortune"		2:35

Side two
No.	Title	Length
9.	"I'm Gonna Say It Now"	2:46
10.	"Santo Domingo"	3:48
11.	"Changes"	4:30
12.	"Is There Anybody Here"	3:17
13.	"Love Me, I'm a Liberal"	3:46
14.	"When I'm Gone"	3:51

Side three
No.	Title	Length
15.	"Outside of a Small Circle of Friends"	3:41
16.	"Pleasures of the Harbor"	4:59
17.	"Tape from California"	3:39
18.	"Chords of Fame"	3:32
19.	"Crucifixion"	7:40

Side four
No.	Title	Length
20.	"The War Is Over"	4:25
21.	"Jim Dean of Indiana"	5:02
22.	"Power and the Glory"	2:21
23.	"Flower Lady"	6:06
24.	"No More Songs"	4:33

== Source material ==
- Track 1 from the 1966 single.
- Tracks 2, 5, 6 and 7 from All the News That's Fit to Sing (1964).
- Track 3 from I Ain't Marching Anymore (1965).
- Tracks 4 and 22 from the 1974 single.
- Tracks 8, 9, 10, 11, 12, 13 and 14 from Phil Ochs in Concert (1966).
- Tracks 15 and 23 from Pleasures of the Harbor (1967).
- Tracks 16 and 17 from Gunfight at Carnegie Hall (1974).
- Tracks 18, 21 and 24 from Greatest Hits (1970).
- Track 19 previously unreleased (recorded 1970).
- Track 20 from Tape from California (1968).
