= The War Is Over: The Best of Phil Ochs =

The War Is Over

Greatest hits album by Phil Ochs
- Released: 1988
- Recorded: 1967–1970
- Genre: Folk
- Label: A&M

Phil Ochs chronology
A Toast to Those Who Are Gone (1986)	The War Is Over (1988)	The Broadside Tapes 1 (1989)

The War Is Over: The Best of Phil Ochs is a 1988 compilation album of Phil Ochs' works on A&M Records recorded between 1967 and 1970. With varying amounts of tracks from the albums, between two and five, from each album except Gunfight At Carnegie Hall (which was unrepresented), it paints a portrait of Ochs' later works that does not emphasize his folk songs, instead presenting the more introspective and/or experimental tracks. It did feature a live version of "I Ain't Marching Anymore" later reissued as a part of the 1991 album that presented the entire concert from which it was culled, There And Now: Live in Vancouver 1968.

Now out of print, it has been replaced by 2002's 20th Century Masters: The Millennium Collection: The Best of Phil Ochs and 2004's Cross My Heart: An Introduction to Phil Ochs.

Professional ratings
Review scores
Source	Rating
Allmusic	3/5 stars

== Track listing ==
All songs by Phil Ochs.

1. "Tape from California" – 6:46
2. "Flower Lady" – 6:03
3. "Half A Century High" – 2:50
4. "The Scorpion Departs but Never Returns" – 4:14
5. "The War Is Over" – 4:22
6. "One Way Ticket Home" – 2:35
7. "Rehearsals for Retirement" – 4:11
8. "Chords of Fame" – 3:30
9. "Gas Station Women" – 3:29
10. "Outside of a Small Circle of Friends" – 3:41
11. "Pleasures of the Harbor" – 8:07
12. "Kansas City Bomber" – 2:27
13. "White Boots Marching In A Yellow Land" – 3:31
14. "Jim Dean of Indiana" – 5:01
15. "No More Songs" – 4:15
16. "I Ain't Marching Anymore" (Live) – 4:31

== Source listing ==
- Tracks 1, 3, 5 and 13 from Tape From California (1968)
- Tracks 2, 10 and 11 from Pleasures Of The Harbor (1967)
- Tracks 4 and 7 from Rehearsals For Retirement (1969)
- Tracks 6, 8, 9, 14 and 15 from Greatest Hits (1970)
- Track 12 from the 1973 single
- Track 16 was performed live in Vancouver, British Columbia, on Thursday, March 13, 1969. According to the liner notes of the CD, this performance was Ochs' first since his arrest at the 1968 Democratic National Convention in Chicago, but this is incorrect.
