= Phil Ochs: There but for Fortune =

- Promotional poster
- Directed by: Kenneth Bowser
- Written by: Kenneth Bowser
- Produced by: Michael Cohl; Kenneth Bowser; Michael Ochs
- Edited by: Pamela Scott Arnold
- Music by: Phil Ochs
- Distributed by: First Run Features
- Release dates: October 1, 2010 (Woodstock); January 5, 2011 (United States)
- Running time: 97 minutes
- Country: United States
- Language: English

Phil Ochs: There but for Fortune is a documentary film on the life and times of folk singer-songwriter Phil Ochs. The film, released theatrically in January 2011, was written and directed by Kenneth Bowser. Its title is taken from one of Ochs' best known songs, "There but for Fortune" (1963).

The documentary features extensive archival footage of Ochs, as well as scenes reflecting the turbulent political climate of the 1960s during which he emerged as a spokesperson on causes such as racial injustice, political oppression, the horrors of war, and labor issues. In addition, it includes interviews with family members and many of the artists and activists who knew him from his arrival in Greenwich Village in the early 1960s through his death in 1976. Also featured are comments from contemporary figures on Ochs' influence. The film was broadcast on January 23, 2012 on the PBS series American Masters.

== Personal biography and political history ==
There but for Fortune is a biography of Ochs as well as a history of the anti-war movement, the folk song revival in the United States, and left-wing political activism during the 1960s. Tracking Ochs' rise to fame during the folk and protest song movements of the period, the film depicts his growing involvement in the radical politics that developed over the decade. Throughout, he wrote hundreds of songs, many of them ripped straight from the daily news. As the film's interviews bring out, Ochs firmly believed his music could change the world for the better.

Besides the archival footage of Ochs and the interviews with others involved in the folk movement, the film features extensive news clips of the events of the times, including the Civil Rights struggle in the South, assassination of John F. Kennedy, rallies protesting US military involvement in Vietnam, the assassination of Martin Luther King Jr., the assassination of Robert F. Kennedy, the Kent State shootings and the "police riot" at the 1968 Democratic National Convention in Chicago. Ochs became a part of the inner circle that sought to defeat US policies, and the film shows interviews with some of the movement's central figures, several of whom were close friends with Ochs, including Abbie Hoffman and Jerry Rubin, co-founders of the Youth International Party, as well as Tom Hayden, who went on to become a California State Senator.

As the film recounts, Ochs first became interested in politics and folk music while attending college at Ohio State University. He eventually dropped out of school and moved to Greenwich Village in 1962. His goal was to become the folk movement's leading songwriter. Unfortunately, Bob Dylan was already on his way to claiming that title, and Ochs had to settle for second best, at least in that regard. One of the film's subjects is the contrast between the two. Dylan, less concerned with politics than his music, abandoned topical songs early on. Ochs, on the other hand, held by his commitment to the era's causes, which made him, in Kenneth Bowser's view, probably the most important protest singer of the 1960s.

According to interviews with those close to Ochs, the political struggles weighed heavily on the folk singer, who took much of it personally. After the events in Chicago, he felt that America had lost its way. Suffering from bipolar disorder, Ochs subsequently became depressed and slid into alcoholism. He committed suicide at his sister's home in 1976.

== Cast ==
In addition to archival footage of Ochs, the film features interviews with his younger brother Michael, a producer of the film and the singer's manager starting in the mid sixties; his older sister, Sonny; his wife, Alice Skinner; and his daughter, Meegan Lee Ochs. It also includes interviews with many of the figures who were connected with Ochs through music and politics, including:

- Joan Baez, the "Queen of Folk Music" during the early 1960s. Baez had a hit with Ochs' song "There but for Fortune" and performed it with him as a duet in a concert appearance.
- Arthur Gorson, record producer, friend and sometime manager of Ochs.
- Tom Hayden, a leader in the 1960s anti-war movement and one of the defendants in the Chicago Seven trial that followed the 1968 Democratic National Convention. Ochs performed during the Chicago demonstrations and appeared at the trial as a defense witness.
- Judy Henske, a 1960s folksinger who first performed with Ochs when he was starting out in Cleveland, Ohio.
- Abbie Hoffman and Jerry Rubin, co-founders of the Youth International Party ("Yippies"), who were also defendants in the Chicago trial.
- Jac Holzman, founder of Elektra Records, Ochs' first recording label.
- Paul Krassner, founder, editor, and publisher of the radical magazine The Realist.
- Larry Marks, producer of Ochs' 1967 album Pleasures of the Harbor.
- Jerry Moss, co-founder of A&M Records, Ochs' second recording label.
- Jack Newfield, Village Voice critic.
- Van Dyke Parks, who produced Ochs' Greatest Hits album.
- Ed Sanders, a co-founder of the Greenwich Village-based band The Fugs.
- Pete Seeger, a leader in the folk music revival of the 1950s and 1960s. Seeger took Ochs and Bob Dylan to meet Sis Cunningham and Gordon Friesen as they were about to start up Broadside, a magazine that focused on protest songs.
- Dave Van Ronk, another prominent Greenwich Village folksinger and a friend of Ochs.
- Peter Yarrow, member of the prominent folk trio Peter, Paul, and Mary.

Among the contemporary figures influenced by Ochs who are featured in the film are singer-songwriter Billy Bragg, singer Jello Biafra, and actor Sean Penn. Literary critic Christopher Hitchens provides commentary on Ochs' career.

== Music ==
The film features parts of about three dozen songs that Ochs had written over the span of his career, from "Draft Dodger Rag" and "I Ain't Marching Anymore" to "Outside of a Small Circle of Friends" and "One Way Ticket Home". It also includes a cover of his song "Love Me, I'm a Liberal" by Jello Biafra and Mojo Nixon. Songs by other artists include Dave Van Ronk's recording of the traditional "He Was a Friend of Mine", Bob Dylan's recording of his song "Blowin' in the Wind", and Chilean activist and singer-songwriter Víctor Jara's recording of his song "El Cigarrito".

== Reception ==
On the review aggregator website Rotten Tomatoes, 97% of 33 critics' reviews are positive. Metacritic, which uses a weighted average, assigned the film a score of 72 out of 100, based on 10 critics, indicating "generally favorable" reviews.
