= Live at Newport (Phil Ochs album) =

Compilation album by Phil Ochs
- Released: 1996
- Recorded: 1963, 1964, 1966
- Genre: Folk
- Label: Vanguard

Phil Ochs chronology
There and Now: Live in Vancouver 1968 (1990)	Live at Newport (1996)	Farewells & Fantasies (1997)

Live at Newport is a 1996 compilation on Vanguard Records of folk singer Phil Ochs' three appearances at the Newport Folk Festival, in 1963, 1964 and 1966. Presenting twelve tracks that also appear on his first, second, third, fourth and fifth albums, Ochs is at his peak as a folk singer throughout, singing anti-war songs alongside those espousing civil rights and worker's rights, and showcasing some more introspective numbers that would be dramatically rearranged on the fourth and fifth albums.

It was re-released four years later with seven additional tracks recorded in the studio for a Vanguard compilation in 1964, the new disc titled The Early Years.

Professional ratings
Review scores
Source	Rating
Allmusic	4/5 stars

== Track listing ==
All songs by Phil Ochs.

1. Introduction by Peter Yarrow – 0:56
2. "The Ballad of Medgar Evers" – 2:44
3. "Talking Birmingham Jam" – 3:22
4. "The Power And The Glory" – 2:11
5. "Draft Dodger Rag" – 2:21
6. "I Ain't Marching Anymore" – 2:36
7. "Links on the Chain" – 5:05
8. "Talkin' Vietnam" – 3:42
9. "Cross My Heart" – 4:44
10. "Half a Century High" – 7:06
11. "Is There Anybody Here" – 3:11
12. "The Party" – 8:11
13. "Pleasures of the Harbor" – 6:25

== Personnel ==
- Phil Ochs - guitar, vocals
- Mary Katherine Alden - reissue producer
