= There but for Fortune (album) =

Compilation album by Phil Ochs
- Released: 1989
- Recorded: 1964–1966
- Genre: Folk
- Length: 71:00
- Label: Elektra

Phil Ochs chronology
The Broadside Tapes 1 (1989)	There but for Fortune (1989)	There and Now: Live in Vancouver 1968 (1990)

There but for Fortune was a 1989 compilation that summed up the three albums that Phil Ochs recorded for Elektra Records between 1964 and 1966. The album drew heavily from the third, presenting ten of its eleven tracks, and presenting six and five respectively from the first and second.

The compact disc edition omits three tracks, two from the first album and one from the second. Both editions lop off a few introductions on the "In Concert" album.

A cover version of "There But For Fortune" by Joan Baez became a top-ten hit in the UK in 1965. Somewhat irritated by her greater success with the song, Ochs sometimes introduced it as "by Joan Baez" in his live performances.

Professional ratings
Review scores
Source	Rating
Allmusic	4.5/5 stars

== Track listing ==
All the songs are by Phil Ochs unless otherwise noted.

1. "What's That I Hear?" – 2:01
2. "One More Parade" (Phil Ochs and Bob Gibson) – 3:18
3. "Too Many Martyrs" – 2:48
4. "The Bells" (Edgar Allan Poe with musical interpretation by Phil Ochs) – 3:00 +
5. "Bound for Glory" – 3:15 +
6. "The Power and the Glory" – 2:16
7. "I Ain't Marchin' Anymore" – 2:34
8. "Draft Dodger Rag" – 2:10
9. "In the Heat of the Summer" – 3:01 +
10. "The Highwayman" (Alfred Noyes with musical interpretation by Phil Ochs) – 5:39
11. "Here's to the State of Mississippi" – 5:53
12. "There But for Fortune" – 2:45
13. "I'm Going to Say It Now" – 2:54
14. "Is There Anybody Here" – 3:28
15. "Cops of the World" – 5:04
16. "Ringing of Revolution" – 7:13
17. "Santo Domingo" – 5:59
18. "Bracero" – 4:10
19. "Love Me, I'm a Liberal" – 4:35
20. "Changes" – 4:40
21. "When I'm Gone" – 4:13

+=omitted from the CD edition.

== Personnel ==
- Phil Ochs - guitar, vocals
- Danny Kalb - guitar (1–6 only)
- Jac Holzman - producer
- Paul A. Rothchild - recording supervisor (1–11 only)
- Mark Abramson - producer (12–21 only)

== Source listing ==
- Tracks 1–6 from All the News That's Fit to Sing (1964)
- Tracks 7–11 from I Ain't Marching Anymore (1965)
- Tracks 12–21 from Phil Ochs in Concert (1966)
