= Vietnam War protest music =

The protest music that came out of the Vietnam War era was stimulated by the unfairness of the draft, the loss of American lives in Vietnam, and the unsupported expansion of war. The Vietnam War era (1960–1975) was a time of great controversy for the American public. Desperate to stop the spread of communism in South-East Asia, the United States joined the war effort. Although it was a civil war between South and North Vietnam, a larger war was taking place behind it. The Soviet Union, a communist country, was supporting North Vietnam, leading the United States to support Southern Vietnam in the hope that it adopts a democratic government. Many of the people in Southern Vietnam did not want America's assistance in the war, and many Americans did not want to be involved.

For the first time in history, the public was not in support of the war and for the first time, they could see its effects from their own living rooms. The Vietnam War has been known as the first "Television War", as it was the first to bring the violence and terror into the homes of many Americans. As Americans experienced and viewed the war from across seas regularly, support for the war began to dwindle. Musical artists at the time were often young people, directly impacted by the war, leading them to illustrate their objections through music, leading to the creation of new genres and styles of music; rock, folk, soul, and blues. Each artist contributed to the movement by describing their own feelings and experiences with the world through music.

== Impacts ==
=== Youth ===
Throughout American history, social movements have always been associated with the youth. In the 1960s particularly, teenagers and young adults were the main protestors of the war. Men of the age of 18 were enrolled in the draft and expected to fight in Vietnam. The legal age to vote against the war was 21, so these boys agreed that if they were old enough to fight in the war they should be old enough to oppose it. They used music as a way to grow culture and support against what they believed as an unjust system.

The opposition against the war was able to help youth of different groups gather together. In an America still filled with racism, young black and white people were able to agree that the cost of life was too high. The protest created by students at this time has been seen as the most pervasive case of student activism in American history. Even with television giving families a front-row seat into the conflict, it did not have much influence on everyday American life. The constant stages against the draft helped keep people aware of the horrors of the war and is said to be pivotal in dissolving public support.

=== Soldiers ===
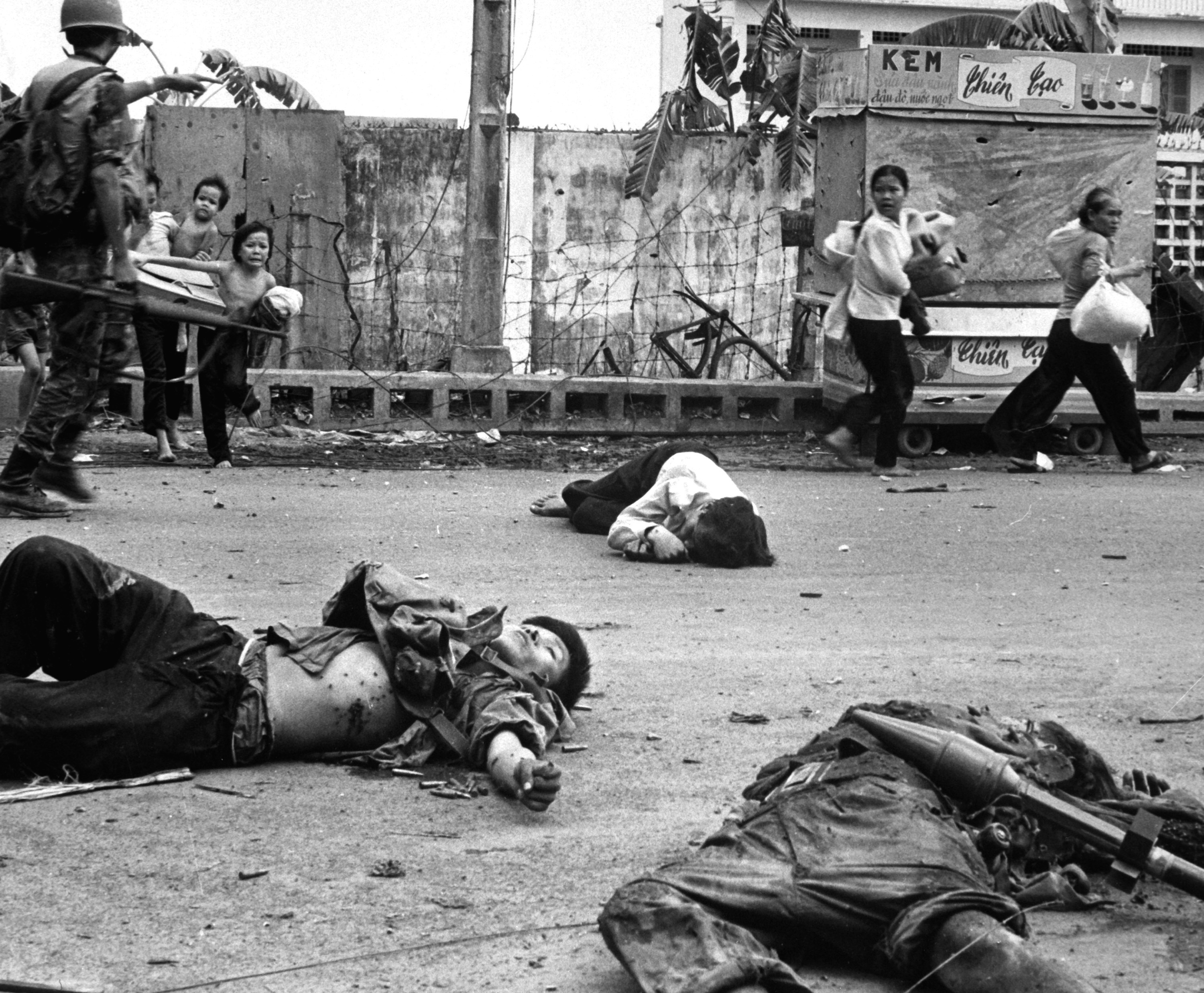
Women and Children are guided past the bodies of three dead Viet Cong men

Up to the 1960s, fighting for ones country was seen as a privilege and honor. John F. Kennedy made declarations of self sacrifice and service that gave young boys a renewed energy to defend their home and family. While away from their loved ones they began to turn to music to combat their loneliness and remind them of home. However, not all songs proved hopeful. Many bands of veterans began to create music of the bitterness of their experiences. Expressing the pain they fought watching not only friends but hundreds of innocent Vietnamese people die every day. As the music on the radio started to drift more into counterculture, so did many soldiers. Songs like "We Gotta Get Out of This Place" resonated with soldiers as it spoke to what they were feeling. They wanted to leave. They wanted to go home, and away from the terror and death they faced daily.

=== Popular culture ===
The impact and significance of the music of the Vietnam era have been represented in movies and television shows during the war and long after. The lyrics included in many of the most popular songs of the era demonstrate the emotions and feelings of many of the young people in America. During the many years that the United States was involved in the war, the war itself and the true experiences of the young men across the seas were kept from the entertainment as the war continued to bring much controversy among the American public. However, some telecast shows at the time challenged this norm. From the year 1967 to 1969, the telecast show The Smothers Brothers Comedy Hour on CBS discussed controversies surrounding the war routinely. The telecast included many musical performances: "Green, Green Grass of Home" performed by Joan Baez in dedication to her husband and his resistance to the draft; Phil Ochs's "Draft Dodger Rag" performed by George Segal; and "Waist Deep in the Big Muddy" boldly performed by Pete Seeger as the song had been previously censored.

The making of films relating to or representing the Vietnam War was slow to start as the war represented such a dark and tragic time in not only United States history but in the history of Vietnam and of the numerous countries involved. The first of the films to represent the Vietnam War was The Green Berets, a pro-US military film that described the experience of a journalist who is unsure about the war and of the United States involvement, but comes to support it after being among the US troops. The song "Ballad of the Green Berets" debuted in the film, contrasted the songs of the era, and was popular among those who supported the United States' involvement in the war. The film was released in 1968, at the pinnacle of the war, and was condemned by critics as it was in great contrast to the anti-war protests held constantly in the United States.

After the end of the war, more films have been made relating to the Vietnam War and have used music from the era to help convey to the audience the emotions of the time. Films such as Apocalypse Now, Platoon, Forrest Gump, and Full Metal Jacket, include the songs "Hello, I Love You", "Fortunate Son", "For What It's Worth", "All Along the Watchtower", "Hello Vietnam", and "The End". Using the songs from the Vietnam War era in the films helps to transport the viewer to the time and to communicate the struggles and the heartbreak that was felt nationwide. The music from the era carried the protest, especially in the then-developing youth anti-war movement.

== Musical protest events ==
=== 1969 Woodstock ===
To counter the depressing and saddening effects of the Vietnam War, many Americans turned to hippie-led counterculture. Hippies represented a sense of freedom from the traditional views and ideas of their parent's generation. Their hair, colorful and abstract clothing, and music represented a great deviation from the generation before. Hippies also experimented greatly with numerous drugs, namely LSD and marijuana among other psychedelic drugs. From this hippie-led counterculture came the revolution through music. Youth in America were proud of their country but were unable to support the decisions being made. Few young people understood the reason for the United States' involvement in the war and of the necessity for the draft. This uncertainty led to the inspiration of popular songs such as "I-Feel-Like-I'm-Fixin'-to-Die Rag", "Prayer for Peace" and "Where Have All the Flowers Gone" which were later heard at the Woodstock Music and Art Fair in August 1969.

Hundreds of thousands of people gathered on a dairy farm in Bethel, NY, to see performers including Joan Baez, The Band, Jefferson Airplane, Ten Years After, Jimi Hendrix, the Grateful Dead, Tim Hardin, The Who, Janis Joplin, Creedence Clearwater Revival, and Crosby, Stills, Nash & Young. Referred to as a landmark moment in music history, the event featured numerous protest songs performed for an audience of approximately half a million.

== Rock and roll ==
Although the Vietnam war is known as the 'First Television', Billboard magazine reported that other conflicts have yet to influence such an immense amount of music. Rock and roll music was created in the late 1940s, and was known for its battle of authority and regulations. Unlike other forms of music, rock does not require a musical talent and is created through the players attitude. It was not about talking about political party or policies, it was talking about emotion and pain. About the way people and situations made you and all of those affected feel. And for the first time their music could spread to all ears. The invention of the radio made it so people did not have to go to concerts or buy vinyl records to discover new music, it could be found in homes across the country with a twist of a knob. Rock music was able to create a feeling in both the artist and the listeners that everything was possible. It created a hope that with enough protest and emotion, normal citizens could stop the war and the bloodshed it creates.

The Beatles’ Sgt. Pepper Lonely Heart Club Band album is identified as the most significant album to come out of rock. It was a sound specifically made for this counterculture movement. It was music that had meaning behind it; it was not meant to be consumed and forgotten; it was meant to be remembered and used. It tried to cut out any feeling of self-importance that would become a new keystone in rock and roll.

The attitude of rock and roll followed the attitude of the public towards the war. Starting with a lack of support at the beginning, to disgust and angry, to rage, hatred, rebellion and protests, and then a more sublet and quiet opposition until the war ended. It did not lead beliefs it followed them. For once there was a media that could stay with the issues instead of falling behind. Movies, television shows, clothes, and other forms of expressions took a lot of time and effort to create, so it was not uncommon for them to talk about issues that had already loosed the contention and spotlight to a new subject. But the simplicity of rock and the ease of the radio allowed reflection of social obsession's to be much clearer.

== Protest songs ==
- "21st Century Schizoid Man" – King Crimson (1969)
- "All Along the Watchtower" – Bob Dylan (1967)
- "Aquarius/Let the Sunshine In" – 5th Dimension (1969)
- "Ballad of Penny Evans" – Steve Goodman (1971)
- "Ballad of the Fort Hood Three" – Pete Seeger (1969)
- "Ballad of the Green Berets" – Barry Sadler (1966)
- "Ballad of the Unknown Soldier" – Barbara Dane (1966)
- "Bring the Boys Home" – Freda Payne (1971)
- "Business Goes on as Usual" – Chad Mitchell Trio (1965)
- "Draft Dodger Rag"- Phil Ochs (1966)
- "Draft Morning" – The Byrds (1968)
- "Eve of Destruction" – Barry McGuire (1965)
- "Fortunate Son" – Creedence Clearwater Revival (1969)
- "For What It’s Worth" – Buffalo Springfield (1966)
- "Green, Green Grass of Home" – Curly Putman (1965)
- "Handsome Johnny" – Richie Havens (1967)
- "Happy Xmas (War Is Over)" – John Lennon and Yoko Ono (1971)
- "Hello, I Love You" - The Doors (1968)
- "Hello Vietnam" – Johnnie Wright (1965)
- "Hell No, I Ain’t Gonna Go!" – Matthew Jones (1967)
- "Hey, Hey LBJ" – Bill Fredrick (1967)
- "I Ain’t Marchin’ Anymore" – Phil Ochs (1965)
- "I Don’t Wanna Go to Vietnam" – John Lee Hooker
- "If You Love Your Uncle Sam, Bring ‘Em Home" – Pete Seeger (1969)
- "Imagine" – John Lennon (1971)
- "I Should Be Proud" – Martha Reeves and The Vandellas (1970)
- "It Better End Soon" – Chicago (1970)
- "Jimmy Newman" – Tom Paxton (1969)
- "Jimmy’s Road" – Willie Nelson (1965)
- "Kill for peace" – The Fugs (1966)
- "Lyndon Johnson Told the Nation" – Tom Paxton (1965)
- "Masters of War" – Bob Dylan (1963)
- "Napalm" – Malvina Reynolds (1965)
- "Ohio" – Crosby, Stills, and Nash Young (1970)
- "People, Let’s Stop the War" – Grand Funk Railroad (1971)
- "Simple song of freedom" – Tim Hardin (1969)
- "Song for David" – Joan Baez (1969)
- "Super Bird" – Country Joe and the Fish (1967)
- "Sweet Cherry Wine" – Tommy James and The Shondells (1969)
- "Talking Vietnam Potluck Blues" – Tom Paxton (1968)
- "The End" – The Doors (1967)
- "The Fires of Napalm" – Jimmy Collier and Frederick Douglass Kirkpatrick (1968)
- "The I-Feel-Like-I’m-Fixin’-to-Die Rag" – Joe McDonald (1966)
- "The Times They are A-Changin" – Bob Dylan (1964)
- "The Unknown Soldier" – The Doors (1968)
- "The War Drags On" – Donovan (1965)
- "The War Is Over" – Phil Ochs (1968)
- "Universal Soldier" – Donovan (1967)
- "Vietnam" – Jimmy Cliff (1969)
- "Vietnam Talking Blues" – Phil Ochs (1964)
- "Waist Deep in the Big Muddy" – Pete Seeger (1966)
- "War!" – The Temptations (1969)
- "We Gotta Get Out of This Place" – The Animals (1965)
- "We Say No To Your War!" – Covered Wagon Musicians (1972)
- "What’s Going On" – Marvin Gaye (1971)
- "Where Have All the Flowers Gone" – Pete Seeger (1955)
- "Wooden Ships" – Crosby, Stills, and Nash Young (1969)
- "Woodstock" – Joni Mitchell (1970)

== See also ==
- List of songs about the Vietnam War
- Vietnam War Song Project
