= There but for Fortune =

There but for Fortune may refer to:

- There but for Fortune (album), a 1989 Phil Ochs album
- "There but for Fortune" (song), a 1964 song written by Phil Ochs
- Phil Ochs: There but for Fortune, a 2011 documentary film
