= The War Is Over =

The War Is Over may refer to:

== Music ==
- The War Is Over (Josh Baldwin album) (2017)
- The War Is Over: The Best of Phil Ochs, a 1988 compilation album of Phil Ochs songs
- "The War Is Over" (Phil Ochs song) (1968)
- "The War Is Over" (Kelly Clarkson song) (2011)
- "The War Is Over", a song by Trust Company from True Parallels (2005)
- "Happy Xmas (War Is Over)", a 1971 song by the Plastic Ono Band

== Film ==
- The War Is Over (1945 film), a Canadian newsreel short
- The War Is Over (1966 film), a French film directed by Alain Resnais
- War Is Over!, a 2022 animated short film
