= Sings for Broadside =

Compilation album by Phil Ochs
- Released: 1976
- Recorded: 1965–1973
- Genre: Folk
- Label: Folkways
- Producers: Paul Kaplan, Gordon Friesen

Phil Ochs chronology
Chords of Fame (1976)	Sings for Broadside (1976)	Interviews with Phil Ochs (1976)

Sings For Broadside, alternatively known as Broadside Ballads, Vol. 10, was a 1976 compilation of songs that Phil Ochs had recorded for Broadside Magazine as demonstration recordings or at benefit shows for them. Initially, Ochs had hoped for the magazine to release one single concert, but when the material he presented to them came up far too short for a full LP and not featuring several of his best and well-known numbers, he suggested they splice on whatever they desired. The result was this album, which featured tracks recorded between about 1965 and about 1973.

Nine songs that appeared on his second, third and fourth albums are supplemented by three tracks that had up to that point never appeared on any Ochs album, two of them, "United Fruit" and "On Her Hand A Golden Ring" only available on this compilation (the third, "What Are You Fighting For", later appeared on the 2000 compilation The Early Years.) The album is available on CD from Smithsonian Folkways Recordings, http://www.folkways.si.edu/albumdetails.aspx?itemid=981

The Clash used one of the lines from "United Fruit" as the closing stanza for their song "Up in Heaven (Not Only Here)", which appeared on their 1980 album Sandinista!.

== Track listing ==
All songs by Phil Ochs.

1. "Pleasures of the Harbor" – (4:12)
2. "That's What I Want to Hear" – (3:10)
3. "I'm Gonna Say It Now" – (1:58)
4. "Changes" – (4:21)
5. "On Her Hand a Golden Ring" – (2:40)
6. "Days of Decision" – (3:11)
7. "Santo Domingo" – (4:35)
8. "United Fruit" – (3:04)
9. "Crucifixion" – (6:17)
10. "Outside of a Small Circle of Friends" – (3:14)
11. "What Are You Fighting For" – (3:30)
12. "Ringing of Revolution" – (5:28)

== Participants ==
- Phil Ochs - guitar, vocals
- Paul Kaplan - producer
- Gordon Friesen - producer
