= Paul Crump =

American novelist

Paul Crump (April 2, 1930 – October 11, 2002) was a death row inmate who gained international notoriety and parole after writing the 1962 novel Burn, Killer, Burn, and being the subject of two documentaries.

== Life and prison sentences ==
Paul Crump was born in 1930, one of 13 children. He claimed in The People vs. Paul Crump that he converted to Catholicism in 1946. When he was 22 years old in 1953, Crump was arrested for killing a security guard in the armed robbery of the Libby, McNeill & Libby meatpacking plant in the Chicago stockyards. His four accomplices received prison sentences, but Crump was sentenced to death in the electric chair of the Cook County Jail and eventually had 15 different execution dates set. Eventually, Louis Nizer took on his case and the sentence was commuted to 119 years without parole by Illinois Governor Otto Kerner.

While in prison, Crump was diagnosed with paranoid schizophrenia. In 1976, Governor Dan Walker dropped the “without parole” provision in Crump’s case. After serving 40 years in prison, Crump was paroled on February 19, 1993 and released to the custody of his only surviving sibling, his sister, Gwendolyn Jones. At the time, Crump told Chicago Tribune reporter Barbara Brotman, “In prison, when you wake up at 2 in the morning, you turn on the light and pace back and forth. Now you look outside and you realize, ‘Damn, there’s a door there, and I’ve got the key.'”

However, Crump found it difficult to adjust to life on the outside, and struggled with alcoholism and frequently refused to take medication to control his violent schizophrenia. In 1999, Crump returned to prison after being convicted of harassing his sister and violating an order of protection. He was then transferred to the Chester Mental Health Center in Chester, Illinois. Soon after, in 2002, Crump died there of pneumonia and lung cancer at the age of 72. At the time of his death, his sister had this to say: “He was my brother and I loved him, and I tried to take care of him and that’s all I know.”

== Book ==
His novel Burn, Killer, Burn! is semi-autobiographical and was published by the black-owned Johnson Publishing Company in 1962. It is about a murderer who commits suicide rather than be executed. Life magazine on July 27, 1962, featured a 4-page article on Paul Crump, "Facing Death, A New Life Perhaps Too Late".

== Documentaries ==
Then an unknown filmmaker, William Friedkin produced and directed a documentary for television titled The People vs. Paul Crump in 1962, when Crump had been on death row for nine years. The program was not aired, due to content regarded as controversial. Nizer's involvement with attorney Donald Moore in the legal battle to have Crump's death sentence commuted was the subject of Robert Drew's 1963 documentary The Chair.

== In song ==
Folk singer Phil Ochs wrote a song entitled "Paul Crump" that chronicled Crump's life. The song appears on three albums by Ochs: The Early Years, A Toast to Those Who Are Gone, and On My Way.
