= There and Now: Live in Vancouver 1968 =

Live album by Phil Ochs
- Released: 1990-91
- Recorded: 1969, Vancouver, British Columbia, Canada
- Genre: Folk
- Producer: Bill Inglot, John Strother

Phil Ochs chronology
There but for Fortune (1989)	There and Now: Live in Vancouver 1968 (1990)	Live at Newport (1996)

There and Now: Live in Vancouver 1968 [sic] was a 1990 (or early 1991) archival release of a concert by Phil Ochs in Vancouver, British Columbia, Canada, at the PNE Garden Auditorium on Thursday, March 13, 1969. Performing solo with guitar (except on "The Bells," where Allen Ginsberg played the bells), Ochs was worn, weary and despairing in the aftermath of the 1968 Democratic National Convention in Chicago. Ochs presents some of his older material, such as "There But For Fortune," "Changes" and "The Highwayman," alongside then-new songs from the as-yet-unreleased Rehearsals for Retirement such as "The Doll House" and "William Butler Yeats Visits Lincoln Park and Escapes Unscathed." The album thus documents two eras of Ochs in one seventy-minute show.

There are conflicting sources about the album's year of release. The CD liner indicates that There and Now: Live in Vancouver was originally released in 1990, but the Farewells & Fantasies box set lists the original release date as January 1991.

Professional ratings
Review scores
Source	Rating
Allmusic	4.5/5 stars

== Track listing ==
All songs by Phil Ochs unless otherwise noted.

1. "There But for Fortune" – 3:02
2. "Outside of a Small Circle of Friends" – 4:04
3. "Where Were You in Chicago? / William Butler Yeats Visits Lincoln Park and Escapes Unscathed" – 5:05
4. "The Scorpion Departs But Never Returns" – 4:41
5. "Pleasures of the Harbor" – 7:07
6. "The World Began in Eden and Ended in Los Angeles" – 3:22
7. "The Bells" (Edgar Allan Poe with musical interpretation by Phil Ochs) – 3:12
8. "The Highwayman" (Alfred Noyes with musical interpretation by Phil Ochs) – 6:54
9. "I Kill Therefore I Am" – 3:50
10. "The Doll House" – 4:08
11. "Another Age" – 4:56
12. "Changes" – 4:45
13. "Crucifixion" – 8:01
14. "I Ain't Marching Anymore" – 4:25

== Personnel ==
- Phil Ochs - guitar, vocals
- Allen Ginsberg - bells (on "The Bells" only)
