= Crucifixion (song) =

Song by Phil Ochs

from the album Pleasures of the Harbor
- Published: 1966
- Released: 1967
- Genre: Psychedelic folk, topical song
- Length: 8:45
- Label: A&M
- Songwriter: Phil Ochs
- Producer: Larry Marks

"Crucifixion" (sometimes titled "The Crucifixion") is a 1966 song by Phil Ochs, an American singer-songwriter. Ochs described the song as "the greatest song I've ever written".

== The song ==
Ochs wrote "Crucifixion" during a two-hour car ride in the middle of his November 1965 concert tour of the UK According to Ochs's manager, Arthur Gorson, the composer was "wary" of how his audience might react to the new song because it did not have an explicit political message. He need not have worried; his first public performance of "Crucifixion" was greeted by a standing ovation.

The song is about the rise and fall of a hero, and the public's role in creating, destroying, and deifying its heroes. The first verse describes an event of cosmic proportions: "the universe explodes", "planets are paralyzed, [and] mountains are amazed" by the raising of a falling star. In the second stanza, a baby is born; the child has been "chosen for a challenge that is hopelessly hard", to redeem the world. The third and fourth verses describe the hero's development: he has the insight that "beneath the greatest love, there's a hurricane of hate", yet he is driven to spread his message of redemption despite the tremendous difficulty.

The fifth and sixth stanzas describe the public acceptance of the hero's message and their adoration of the hero, but warns that "success is an enemy to the losers of the day" and that the people who are applauding the hero are salivating for his destruction. The hero's downfall comes in the seventh verse, when "the gentle soul is ripped apart and tossed into the fire". The eighth stanza quotes the public's reaction to the hero's destruction: "Who would want to hurt such a hero?" "I knew he had to fall." "How did it happen?" "Tell me every detail." In the ninth and tenth verses, the hero's myth grows as the public's memory of the events fades, and his message is sterilized; the cycle has ended. "Crucifixion" ends with a repetition of the first stanza, suggesting the birth of a new hero.

"Crucifixion" usually is interpreted by listeners as an allegory likening the life and assassination of U.S. President John F. Kennedy to the career of Jesus, although Ochs intentionally chose not to tie the title directly to the famous crucifixion, allowing the listener to understand that "the same tragic sacrifice recurs throughout history". In 1973, Ochs explained "Crucifixion" to Studs Terkel. In the distant past, Ochs said, the people would sacrifice a healthy young man to the gods; today, things were the same.

The Kennedy assassination, in a way, was destroying our best in some kind of ritual. People say they really love the reformer, they love the radical, but they want to see him killed. It's a certain part of the human psyche—the dark side of the human psyche.

Critical response to "Crucifixion" was mixed. A writer at Beat described the song as "Ochs' most important work to date" and Billboard wrote that it was "very hip". Robert Christgau, however, wrote that the song "suffer[s] from elephantiasis of the ambitions". In March 1967, U.S. Senator Robert F. Kennedy and journalist Jack Newfield met Ochs, who sang "Crucifixion" for them; when Kennedy realized the song was about his brother, tears came to his eyes.

== Recordings ==
The first recording of "Crucifixion" was released in 1966 by Jim and Jean, a musical duo made up of Ochs's college friend Jim Glover and Glover's wife, Jean Ray.

=== Recordings by Ochs ===
Ochs released a densely arranged version of the song on his 1967 album Pleasures of the Harbor. Three acoustic versions of the song performed by Ochs were released after his death.

==== Pleasures of the Harbor version ====
Joseph Byrd was invited by Ochs and Record producer Larry Marks to arrange "Crucifixion". Byrd recalled:

Phil asked me to arrange the song. I really didn't think it should be arranged, because its power is in the simplicity of the lyric. But he wanted the kitchen sink: Schoenberg, Stravinsky, Cage, electronic sound.

The resulting arrangement included brass instruments, flutes, strings, organ, electric harpsichord, percussion, backward tapes, and electronic oscillations.

Opinions concerning Byrd's arrangement vary. Mark Brend describes it as "one of the most audacious arrangements in all of pop music" and "one of the great moments of experimentation in all of 1960s pop music". Jeremy Simmonds writes that the production "diluted" the song. Richie Unterberger says the arrangement "works against the song"; both Unterberger and Christgau compare Ochs's recording unfavorably with that of Jim and Jean.

Ochs defended the orchestration when the album was released, but years later he confided in his brother that he felt it had been a failure.

==== Acoustic versions ====
An acoustic version of "Crucifixion", consisting of Ochs accompanying himself on guitar, was recorded on March 13, 1969, in Vancouver, British Columbia. It was released in 1991 on There and Now: Live in Vancouver 1968 [sic].

Another acoustic version of the song was recorded at New York City's Carnegie Hall on March 27, 1970. Portions of the concert were released in 1975 as Gunfight at Carnegie Hall. This acoustic version was first issued on the 1976 compilation Chords of Fame, released shortly after Ochs's death. It is also included in the 1997 box set Farewells & Fantasies.

A third acoustic version of "Crucifixion" was released on the 1976 compilation Sings for Broadside. It is believed to have been recorded at Vassar College on October 12, 1974.

=== Cover versions ===
"Crucifixion" has been covered by several performers beside Jim and Jean, including Greg Greenway, Jeannie Lewis, David Massengill, Garnet Rogers, Anna Coogan and Glenn Yarbrough.

== See also ==
- Cultural depictions of John F. Kennedy
