= William Lewis Moore =

American postal worker, Congress of Racial Equality (CORE) (1927–1963)

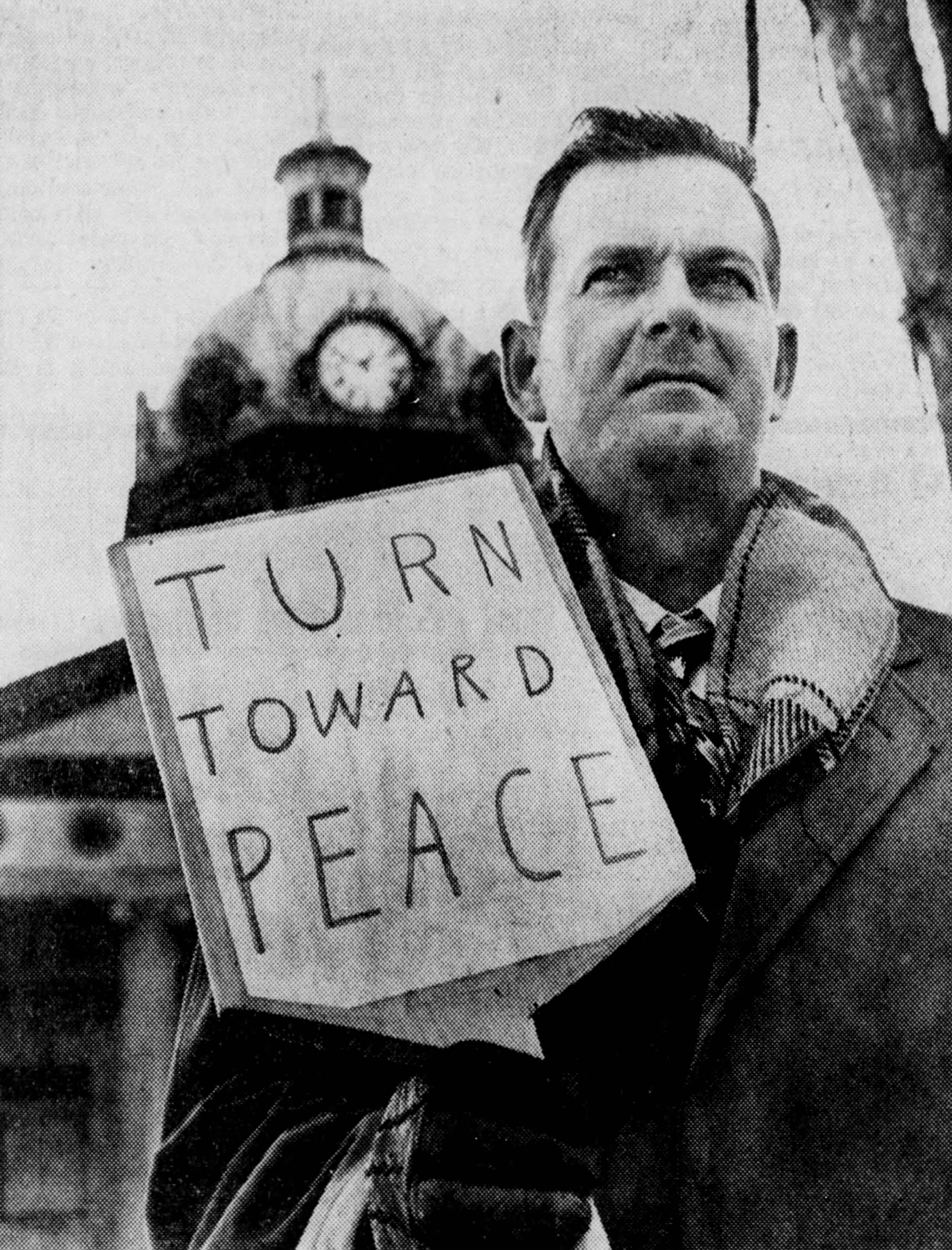
- Moore protesting outside Broome County Courthouse in 1962
- Born: April 28, 1927; Binghamton, New York, U.S.
- Died: April 23, 1963 (aged 35); Etowah County, Alabama, U.S.
- Organization: Congress of Racial Equality
- Movement: Civil Rights Movement

William Lewis Moore (April 28, 1927 – April 23, 1963) was an American postal worker and Congress of Racial Equality (CORE) member who staged lone protests against racial segregation. He was assassinated in Keener, Alabama, during a protest march from Chattanooga, Tennessee to Jackson, Mississippi, where he intended to deliver a letter to Governor Ross Barnett, supporting civil rights.

== Life ==
Moore was born in Binghamton, New York, and raised in New York and Mississippi. For a time before his death he lived in Baltimore, Maryland.

In the early 1950s, when Moore was a graduate student at Johns Hopkins University, he had a mental breakdown. He was institutionalized for a year and a half with a diagnosis of schizophrenia. After being released, he became an activist on behalf of the mentally ill. He gradually got involved in civil rights activism for African Americans.

Moore joined the Congress on Racial Equality (CORE). In the early 1960s, he undertook three civil rights protests in which he marched to a capital to hand-deliver letters he had written denouncing racial segregation.

On his first march he walked to Annapolis, Maryland, the state capital. On his second march he walked to the White House. He arrived at about the same time that Rev. Martin Luther King Jr. was being released from the Birmingham jail after protests in that city. His letter to President John F. Kennedy said that he intended to walk to Mississippi and "If I may deliver any letters from you to those on my line of travel, I would be most happy to do so."

For his third protest he planned to walk from Chattanooga, Tennessee to Jackson, Mississippi and deliver a letter to Governor Ross Barnett urging him to accept integration. He was wearing sandwich board signs stating: "Equal rights for all" and "Mississippi or Bust".

On April 23, 1963, about 70 miles (110 km) into his march, Moore was interviewed by Charlie Hicks, a reporter from radio station WGAD in Gadsden, Alabama, along a rural stretch of U.S. Highway 11 near Attalla. The station had received an anonymous phone tip about Moore's location. In the interview, Moore said: "I intend to walk right up to the governor's mansion in Mississippi and ring his doorbell. Then I'll hand him my letter." Concerned for Moore's safety, Hicks offered to drive him to a motel. Moore insisted on continuing his march.

Less than an hour after the reporter left the scene, a passing motorist found Moore's body about a mile farther down the road, shot twice in the head at close range with a .22 caliber rifle. The gun's ownership was traced to Floyd Simpson, a white man who was a known "investigator" for the local Ku Klux Klan chapter, whom Moore had also openly argued with just earlier that same day; however in September 1963, an Etowah County grand jury decided there was not enough evidence to indict Simpson. Moore died a week short of his 36th birthday. His letter was found and opened. In it, Moore reasoned that "the white man cannot be truly free himself until all men have their rights." He asked Governor Barnett to: "Be gracious and give more than is immediately demanded of you...."

Folk singer Phil Ochs wrote a song in tribute to William Moore that is part of the posthumously released 1986 album A Toast to Those Who Are Gone. Another tribute song (in German) for William Moore was written by East German singer/songwriter Wolf Biermann. Pete Seeger sang "William Moore, The Mailman" on his album, Broadside Ballads.

Starting April 23, 2008, Ellen Johnson and Ken Loukinen walked the 320 miles (510 km) from Reece City, Alabama, near where Moore was killed, and delivered Bill Moore's original letter to the capitol in Jackson, Mississippi. Bob Zellner, a long time activist and first white Field Secretary of the Student Non-Violent Coordinating Committee, was with them and attempted to present the letter to Governor Haley Barbour on May 6, 2008, but the latter declined to meet with the party.

== Memorial ==
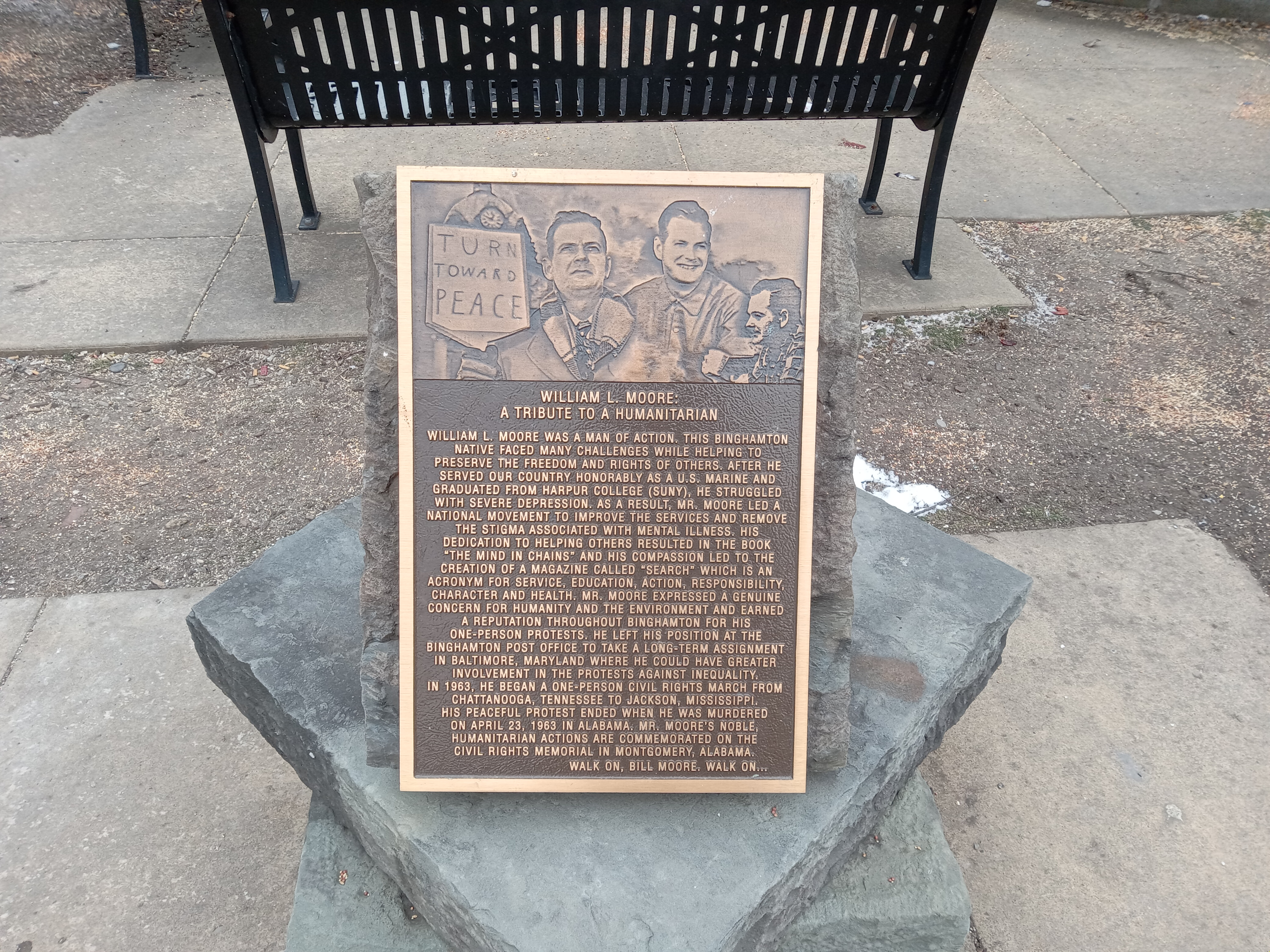
The memorial plaque in Binghamton, New York in honor of civil rights activist William Lewis Moore.

On the 47th anniversary of Moore's murder, April 23, 2010, a memorial plaque in tribute to Moore was unveiled. The plaque is permanently on display at the Greater Binghamton Transportation Center, across from Kennedy Park and down the street from the Martin Luther King Jr. Promenade, in Binghamton, New York.

== Historical marker ==
A ceremony unveiling the historic marker was held on Sunday, April 14, 2019, at the site of the murder. The Alabama Historical Society makes placement of such markers possible, but someone else has to pay for them. As the effort went forward, the Southern Poverty Law Center offered to pay the cost of the marker, estimated to be about $3,000. But Jerry Smith, Danny Crownover and Marissa Cannon, local Etowah County historians, believe the money should come locally to mark this tragic day in local history. Cannon was preparing to do some fundraising in the Attalla area when Smith got in contact with County Commissioner Johnny Grant. Grant arranged for Smith to speak to the commission, and members committed to giving money from their discretionary funds to pay for the marker. Smith said the SPLC remains involved and is making a $2,000 donation to Keener Baptist Church for its work toward the ceremony.

== See also ==
- James Reeb
- Viola Liuzzo
- Murders of Chaney, Goodman, and Schwerner
- List of unsolved deaths
