= Interviews with Phil Ochs =

Studio album by Phil Ochs
- Released: 1976
- Recorded: 1968
- Genre: Folk
- Producer: Paul Kaplan

Phil Ochs chronology
Sings for Broadside (1976)	Interviews with Phil Ochs (1976)	A Toast to Those Who Are Gone (1986)

Interviews with Phil Ochs, alternatively known as Broadside Ballads, Vol. 11, is, as its title states, an interview with folksinger Phil Ochs conducted by Broadside Magazine around 1968 and released around eight years later, after Ochs' April 1976 suicide. The audio is available as a digital download on iTunes. A download or CD is also available from Smithsonian Folkways Recordings at http://www.folkways.si.edu/albumdetails.aspx?itemid=982

== Track listing ==
=== Side one ===
- An introduction and background of Ochs, focusing on the past.

=== Side two ===
- A general frustration with America circa 1968.
