= The Early Years (Phil Ochs album) =

Compilation album by Phil Ochs
- Released: June 20, 2000
- Recorded: 1963–1966
- Genre: Folk

Phil Ochs chronology
American Troubadour (1997)	The Early Years (2000)	20th Century Masters: The Millennium Collection: The Best of Phil Ochs (2002)

The Early Years is a compilation of seven recordings Phil Ochs made for a Vanguard compilation in 1964 and twelve made at three Newport Folk Festivals in 1963, 1964, and 1966, the latter tracks previously released on the 1996 compilation Live at Newport.

Of the seven studio tracks, only five had actually been released by Vanguard on the compilation The Original New Folks, Vol. 2, "How Long" and "Davey Moore" making their debut here. They are all in the vein of Ochs' first two albums, with their focus on human and civil rights stories seemingly pulled from Newsweek. The seminal "There But For Fortune" made its debut here.

Professional ratings
Review scores
Source	Rating
Allmusic	4/5 stars

== Track listing ==
All songs by Phil Ochs.

1. "William Moore" – 3:08
2. "What Are You Fighting For?" – 2:47
3. "There But for Fortune"– 2:15
4. "Paul Crump" – 3:18
5. "Talking Airplane Disaster" – 3:47
6. "How Long" – 3:08
7. "Davey Moore" – 3:03
8. "Introduction by Peter Yarrow" – 0:56
9. "The Ballad of Medgar Evers" – 2:44
10. "Talking Birmingham Jam" – 3:22
11. "The Power and the Glory" – 2:11
12. "Draft Dodger Rag" – 2:21
13. "I Ain't Marching Anymore" – 2:36
14. "Links on the Chain" – 5:05
15. "Talkin' Vietnam" – 3:42
16. "Cross My Heart" – 4:44
17. "Half a Century High" – 7:06
18. "Is There Anybody Here" – 3:11
19. "The Party" – 8:11
20. "Pleasures of the Harbor" – 6:25

== Personnel ==
- Phil Ochs – guitar, vocals
- Tom Vickers – reissue producer
