= Gunfight at Carnegie Hall =

Live album by Phil Ochs
- Released: 1974
- Recorded: March 27, 1970
- Venues: Carnegie Hall, New York City
- Genres: Folk, rock, country
- Length: 47:19
- Label: A&M
- Producer: Phil Ochs

Phil Ochs chronology
Greatest Hits (1970)	Gunfight at Carnegie Hall (1974)	Chords of Fame (1976)

Gunfight At Carnegie Hall is a live album by Phil Ochs, released in Canada and Japan in 1974 by A&M Records. The final album by Ochs released during his lifetime, it was recorded at Carnegie Hall in New York City on March 27, 1970, during the first of two shows Ochs performed at the venue that day.

The shows featured Ochs performing covers of songs by Elvis Presley, Conway Twitty, Buddy Holly and Merle Haggard, as well as a selection of re-arranged songs from his own back catalog, backed by a rock band and dressed in a gold lamé Nudie suit (as seen on the cover of his album Greatest Hits, released a few weeks prior to the performance).

The first set, captured on the album, was cut short by a telephoned bomb threat; Ochs injured his hand when breaking into Carnegie Hall's box office to allow free entry to the second show to fans who were angered that they had not been able to see a full concert. The second performance went on for three hours, ending only when the venue cut the power to the microphones (the audience response to this is heard on the album). Ochs was banned from performing at Carnegie Hall following this show.

Although Ochs had begged A&M to release an album of the Carnegie Hall performances, it would be four years before the label relented, and released the album only in Canada and Japan. It was not released in the United States until its reissue on compact disc by Mobile Fidelity Sound Lab in the late 1980s.

== Background ==
Gunfight at Carnegie Hall comprises songs recorded at Phil Ochs' infamous, gold-suited, bomb-threat shortened first show at Carnegie Hall in New York City on March 27, 1970. The shows recorded that day served to surprise Ochs' fans, from his gold lamé Nudie suit, modeled after Elvis Presley's, to his covers of Presley, Conway Twitty, Buddy Holly and Merle Haggard songs, to his own re-arranged songs. Some fans loved it, but some attendees at the show were unhappy with the music he was playing, wanting only to hear "old" Ochs. Before he had a chance to convince them, the concert was cut short by a telephoned bomb threat.

Some angry fans who had paid for a full concert confronted Phil at dinner between shows. He took their names, promising to get them into the second show for free, but the box office was locked and Ochs smashed the glass, severely cutting his thumb. He appeared onstage at the second show with a bandaged hand, telling the audience the story. Breaking into the lockbox was the last straw. While they let Ochs perform the second show, he was banned immediately afterwards from performing again at the venue.

On the Gunfight album, before performing a medley of Buddy Holly songs, Ochs describes Holly's influence on the songs for which he would become famous, such as "I Ain't Marching Anymore". Ochs says that Holly's songs were "just as much Phil Ochs as anything else". When some of the audience shouted and booed, Ochs admonishes them to "not be like Spiro Agnew", saying that their prejudice against certain forms of music was bigotry: "You can be a bigot from all sides. You can be a bigot against blacks; you can be a bigot against music". Many in the audience cheer at this sentiment.

The second show, which started at midnight, went on for more than three hours. When Carnegie Hall cut the power to the microphones in the middle of Ochs' performing a medley of Elvis songs, he shouted out and the remaining audience started chanting "We want power!" until the microphones were turned back on. (Although the Gunfight album is composed of performances from the first show, the chant from the second show is included.) Many fans remained to the very end of the concert, cheering and dancing, enjoying this chance to share what many felt was a historic moment with Ochs.

== Release and legacy ==
Ochs begged his record label, A&M, to release an album of his Carnegie Hall performances in late 1970. They refused, and the tapes languished for four years in the vaults until the label relented, releasing fifty minutes of material, mostly the cover versions (four of sixteen originals performed were released, compared to five of seven covers). The album was released only in Canada and Japan; it was not released in the United States until Mobile Fidelity Sound Lab issued it on compact disc in the late 1980s.

There is no talk of a complete release of either show, although an acoustic version of "Crucifixion" was released on the 1976 compilation Chords Of Fame and the 1997 box set Farewells & Fantasies and an additional cover, Chuck Berry's "School Days", appeared on the 1997 British anthology, American Troubadour. Copies of the entire second show are known to be traded among fans. (Note: A complete recording of the second show at Carnegie Hall on March 27, 1970, is available at the Internet Archive.) Ochs had been drinking between shows, and his voice was not in as good shape as it had been for the first show, though the between-song patter gives many insights into his frame of mind and the motives behind Greatest Hits and the subsequent gold-suited shows.

The cover to Tom Morello's 2011 album World Wide Rebel Songs is a homage to Gunfight at Carnegie Hall.

Professional ratings
Review scores
Source	Rating
Allmusic	4.5/5 stars

== Track listing ==
1. "Mona Lisa" (Ray Evans, Jay Livingston) – 3:49
2. "I Ain't Marching Anymore" (Phil Ochs) – 4:23
3. "Okie From Muskogee" (Roy Burris, Merle Haggard) – 2:49
4. "Chords of Fame" (Ochs) – 4:49
5. "Buddy Holly Medley : Not Fade Away / I'm Gonna Love You Too / Think It Over / Oh, Boy! / Everyday / It's So Easy / Not Fade Away" (Charles Hardin, Norman Petty, Joe B. Mauldin, Niki Sullivan, Sonny West, Bill Tilghman, Jerry Allison) – 7:18
6. "Pleasures of the Harbor" (Ochs) – 5:59
7. "Tape from California" (Ochs) – 5:09
8. "Elvis Medley : My Baby Left Me / Ready Teddy / Heartbreak Hotel / All Shook Up / Are You Lonesome Tonight? / My Baby Left Me" (Arthur Crudup, John Marascalco, Robert Blackwell, Jerry Leiber, Mike Stoller, Otis Blackwell, Roy Turk, Lou Handman) – 10:12
9. "A Fool Such as I" (Bill Trader) – 2:00

== Personnel ==
- Phil Ochs - guitar, vocals
- Bob Rafkin - guitar, backing vocals
- Lincoln Mayorga - piano
- Kenny Kaufman - bass, backing vocals
- Kevin Kelley - drums

== See also ==
- Jim Glover
