= Amchitka (album) =

Live album by Joni Mitchell, James Taylor, and Phil Ochs
- Released: November 2009
- Recorded: October 16, 1970
- Venues: Pacific Coliseum (Vancouver, British Columbia)
- Genre: Folk
- Label: Greenpeace
- Producer: John Timmins

Joni Mitchell chronology
Shine (2007)	Amchitka (2009)	Love Has Many Faces: A Quartet, a Ballet, Waiting to Be Danced (2014)

James Taylor chronology
Other Covers (2009)	Amchitka (2009)	The Essential James Taylor (2013)

Phil Ochs chronology
Cross My Heart: An Introduction to Phil Ochs (2004)	Amchitka (2009)	On My Way (2010)

Amchitka is a 2009 two-CD release of a recording of Joni Mitchell, James Taylor and Phil Ochs performing an October 16, 1970, benefit concert at the Pacific Coliseum in Vancouver. The event funded Greenpeace's protests of 1971 nuclear weapons tests by the U.S. Atomic Energy Commission at Amchitka, Alaska.

Irving Stowe, one of Greenpeace's founding members, organized the benefit concert, with the assistance of Joan Baez. She could not appear, but she connected Stowe with Mitchell and Mitchell requested her boyfriend of the time, Taylor, join the concert. The Stowe family held on to tapes of the concert, but were not able to obtain the necessary clearances until John Timmins, brother of Cowboy Junkies members, became involved with Greenpeace. Timmins was instrumental in contacting Mitchell and Taylor's representatives and working out the necessary permissions. The tapes had to be restored by Peter J. Moore, the producer of several Cowboy Junkies albums.

== Track listing ==
Disc One

1. Introduction Irving Stowe 1:38
2. Introduction of Phil Ochs 0:11
3. "The Bells" (Edgar Allan Poe, Phil Ochs) 3:09
4. "Rhythms of Revolution" 4:25
5. "Chords of Fame" 2:47
6. "I Ain't Marching Anymore" 3:01
7. "Joe Hill" 7:10
8. "Changes" 3:36
9. "I'm Gonna Say It Now" 2:57
10. "No More Songs" 3:49
11. Introduction of James Taylor 0:32
12. "Something in the Way She Moves" 3:09
13. "Fire and Rain" 3:52
14. "Carolina in My Mind" 4:39
15. "Blossom" 2:30
16. "Riding On a Railroad" 3:04
17. "Sweet Baby James" 3:27
18. "You Can Close Your Eyes" 2:31

Disc Two

1. Introduction of Joni Mitchell 0:17
2. "Big Yellow Taxi"/"Bony Maroney" (Larry Williams) 4:00
3. "Cactus Tree" 4:28
4. "The Gallery" 4:26
5. "Hunter" 2:36
6. "My Old Man" 4:29
7. "For Free" 5:08
8. "Woodstock" 5:16
9. "Carey"/"Mr. Tambourine Man" (Bob Dylan) 10:13 [duet with Taylor]
10. "A Case of You" 4:44
11. "The Circle Game" 2:38 [duet with Taylor]

== See also ==
- 1970 in the environment
