= On My Way (Phil Ochs album) =

Studio album by Phil Ochs
- Released: June 22, 2010
- Genre: Folk
- Label: Micro Werks

Phil Ochs chronology
Amchitka (2009)	On My Way (2010)

Professional ratings
Review scores
Source	Rating
AllMusic	3/5 stars

On My Way is a 2010 album of previously unreleased Phil Ochs performances, originally recorded in 1963 by Roy Connors of The Highwaymen.

== Track listing ==
1. "The A.M.A. Song"
2. "The Ballad of Davey Moore"
3. "On My Way"
4. "Morning"
5. "The Ballad of U.S. Steel"
6. "Once I Lived the Life of a Commissar"
7. "Lou Marsh"
8. "New Town"
9. "Hazard, Kentucky"
10. "Time Was"
11. "I'll Be There"
12. "Paul Crump"
13. "The Ballad of William Worthy"
14. "The Power and The Glory"
15. "The Ballad of Oxford, Mississippi"
16. "Talking Cuban Crisis"
17. "How Long"
18. "Never Again"
19. "Don't Try Again"
20. "First Snow"
21. "Bobby Dylan Record"
22. "The Ballad of Ruben Jaramillo"
23. "The Ballad of Alferd Packer"
24. "Talking Airplane Disaster"
25. "Spanish Lament"
