= Vietnam Talking Blues =

Song by Phil Ochs

from the album All the News That's Fit to Sing
- Released: April 1964
- Genre: Protest song
- Length: 3:38
- Label: Elektra
- Songwriter(s): Phil Ochs
- Producer(s): Jac Holzman

"Vietnam Talking Blues" (sometimes titled " Vietnam Talkin’ Blues") is an American folk-style song by Phil Ochs, a U.S folk singer specializing in protest songs. His career began in the 1960s with his outspoken resistance to the Vietnam War. Formally released in his debut album, All the News That’s Fit to Sing, "Vietnam Talking Blues" held the third position on the album, coming in at 3 minutes and 38 seconds long.

"Vietnam Talking Blues" was relevant and timely, being “the first protest song to directly refer to Vietnam by name.” Ochs released the album All the News That’s Fit to Sing in April 1964, “a full four months before the Gulf of Tonkin Incident and the first major escalation of the American presence in Vietnam.”
