= Larry Marks (record producer) =

Lawrence Barry Marks (October 3, 1939 — Feb. 24, 2013) was a record producer, songwriter, conductor, and music industry and film production executive. He worked for Columbia Records, A&M Records, and Warner Bros. Records.

Marks produced recordings by Helen Reddy, Phil Ochs, Chad & Jeremy, The Merry-Go-Round, Chris Montez, Liza Minnelli, Lee Michaels, Dillard and Clark, The Flying Burrito Brothers, Anthony Newley, Jimmy Webb, Mel Tormé, Keith Allison, and others.

As a composer, Marks songs were recorded by Frankie Laine, Frank Sinatra, Jack Jones, Lesley Gore, Jimmie F. Rodgers, Helen Reddy, Shirley Horn, Liza Minnelli, Doris Day, and others.

Marks was born in Los Angeles, California, to Dorothy and Robert Marks. He attended the Juilliard School in New York before returning to Los Angeles to write and produce music.

== Career as Recording Artist ==
As a recording artist, he released several commercially unsuccessful singles under the name Larry Marks.

Marks was on staff at LHI Records, owned by singer Lee Hazlewood, and a planned solo album by Marks was hijacked by Hazlewood. "13 is one of Lee Hazlewood’s strongest albums. It’s also, technically speaking, not really a Lee Hazlewood album," wrote Will Schube at Bandcamp Daily. "13 originated as a vehicle for Larry Marks, a studio employee for ... LHI Records. 'He took my voice off … and put his voice on the album,' Marks recalls. 'These [songs] were in my keys, it was my charts, it was my everything. Lee Hazlewood was not even remotely going to be considered as an artist for this album, and that’s the way he wanted it'. As the LHI funding well slowly ran dry, Hazlewood disbanded the California wing of the label, taking off to Sweden with the master tapes for Marks’ supposed release. ... In Sweden, Hazlewood found minor celebrity and a market eager to devour his LHI work. ... Once 13 was stripped of its origins, it became a Hazlewood record, Marks’ fingerprints ably erased by the mustachioed master’s indelible sound."

On Randy Newman's 1972 album Sail Away, Marks conducted the orchestra on the track "Old Man."

== Highlights as Producer ==
He produced the debut album by Helen Reddy, I Don't Know How to Love Him, as well as her self-titled second album.

He produced the groundbreaking 1969 debut album by The Flying Burrito Brothers, The Gilded Palace of Sin.

In 1966 he produced Gene Clark with the Gosdin Brothers, the debut solo album by former Byrds lead vocalist Gene Clark. According to historian Neal Umphred, "Columbia staff producer Larry Marks was assigned to work on the album as Gene apparently did not want to work with former Byrds producer Terry Melcher. The Byrds had broken with Melcher while Clark was still with the group over an undisclosed rift between the band and the producer." However, before the album was finished, Marks left Columbia and went to work for A&M Records, leaving the album to be finished by Gary Usher, who ironically was also now producing The Byrds.

For folk singer Phil Ochs, he produced a trio of musically complex albums, Pleasures of the Harbor (1967), Tape from California (1968), and Rehearsals for Retirement (1969). Of the first, William Ruhlmann at AllMusic wrote: "Going into the studio after Dylan's move into rock accompaniment and Sgt. Pepper's vast expansion of pop music, Ochs wanted to make a record that reflected all these trends, and he hired producer Larry Marks, arranger Ian Freebairn-Smith, and pianist Lincoln Mayorga — all of whom had classical backgrounds — to help him realize his vision. The result was Pleasures of the Harbor, his most musically varied and ambitious album, one routinely cited as his greatest accomplishment."

== Acoustic bass amps ==
Marks and his son Steve Marks founded the Acoustic Control Corporation in Los Angeles in the late 1960s. According to the company's history, their "powerful Acoustic 361 bass stack ... became the go-to bass amp in the '70s and '80s as larger venues demanded amps with more power and stadium-filling tone." Acoustic bass amps were popularized by Larry Graham (of Sly and the Family Stone), John McVie (of Fleetwood Mac), Robbie Krieger (of The Doors), John Paul Jones (of Led Zeppelin), and Jaco Pastorius.

== Motion picture career ==
Marks joined Warner Bros. Motion Pictures in 1973 as vice president of music for film and television. He then was named vice president of production. He subsequently served as senior vice president of productions at Rastar Films and founded Marks Management, which represented film-score composers, including Free Design founder/songwriter Chris Dedrick.

His later screen-related credits include score producer on Don't Tell Mom the Babysitter's Dead (1991), music manager on Back to the Future … The Ride (1991), and music supervisor on The Amateurs (2005).

He died in Santa Barbara, California.
