= A Toast to Those Who Are Gone =

Compilation album by Phil Ochs
- Released: 1986
- Recorded: Early–mid-1960s
- Genre: Folk
- Length: 43:57
- Label: Rhino
- Producers: Ken Perry (remastering), Bill Inglot (remastering)

Phil Ochs chronology
Interviews with Phil Ochs (1976)	A Toast to Those Who Are Gone (1986)	The War Is Over: The Best of Phil Ochs (1988)

A Toast to Those Who Are Gone is a 1986 compilation album of recordings that Phil Ochs made in the early to mid-1960s, mostly between his contracts with Elektra Records and A&M Records. In line with recordings made on the former, Ochs espouses his left-leaning views on civil rights on songs like "Ballad of Oxford", "Going Down To Mississippi" and "Colored Town", his views on worker's rights on "No Christmas in Kentucky", his attack on the American Medical Association on "A.M.A. Song", and the unwilling hero (perhaps Ochs himself) on the title track.

The CD carried an extra track, "The Trial", and the liner notes were by noted Ochs fan Sean Penn.

Professional ratings
Review scores
Source	Rating
AllMusic	3/5 stars

== Track listing ==
All songs by Phil Ochs.

1. "Do What I Have to Do" – 2:36
2. "The Ballad of Billie Sol" – 2:24
3. "Colored Town" – 3:00
4. "A.M.A. Song" – 2:17
5. "William Moore" – 3:07
6. "Paul Crump" – 3:34
7. "Going Down To Mississippi" – 3:04
8. "I'll Be There" – 2:10
9. "Ballad of Oxford (Jimmy Meredith)" – 2:51
10. "No Christmas in Kentucky" – 3:04
11. "A Toast to Those Who Are Gone" – 3:31
12. "I'm Tired" – 2:20
13. "City Boy" – 1:58
14. "Song of My Returning" – 5:17
15. "The Trial" – 2:44
  - Bonus track on CD only

== Personnel ==
- Phil Ochs – guitar, vocals
- A. N. Other – bass, piano, guitar, mandolin
