= The Broadside Tapes 1 =

Compilation album by Phil Ochs
- Released: 1989
- Recorded: 1962–64
- Genre: Folk
- Length: 32:48
- Label: Smithsonian/Folkways
- Producer: Paul Kaplan

Phil Ochs chronology
The War Is Over: The Best of Phil Ochs (1988)	The Broadside Tapes 1 (1989)	There but for Fortune (1989)

Professional ratings
Review scores
Source	Rating
Allmusic	link

The Broadside Tapes 1, alternatively known as Broadside Ballads, Vol. 14, was a compilation of demo recordings done by Phil Ochs for Broadside magazine in the early-to-late 1960s. Of the sixteen songs that appeared, ranging from the humorous ("The Ballad of Alferd Packer") to the depressing ("The Passing of My Life"), all were new to listeners. It also included a song about the Profumo affair ("Christine Keeler") and it closed with a live cover of The Beatles' "I Should Have Known Better" (retitled "I Shoulda Known Better") featuring Eric Andersen on harmony vocals and harmonica.

== Track listing ==
All songs by Phil Ochs unless otherwise noted.

1. "The Ballad of Alferd Packer" – 2:11
2. "If I Knew" – 2:18
3. "The Ballad of John Henry Faulk" – 3:08
4. "Spaceman" – 2:09
5. "On My Way" – 1:40
6. "Hazard, Kentucky" – 2:09
7. "The Passing of My Life" – 2:21
8. "That's The Way It's Gonna Be" (Phil Ochs, Bob Gibson) – 2:35
9. "Rivers of the Blood" – 1:59
10. "Remember Me" – 2:22
11. "Talkin' Pay TV" – 2:33
12. "Christine Keeler" – 1:30
13. "Spanish Civil War Song" – 2:11
14. "Another Country" – 2:21
15. "Time Was" – 1:38
16. "I Shoulda Known Better" (John Lennon, Paul McCartney) – 3:32

== Personnel ==
- Phil Ochs - guitar, vocals
- Eric Andersen - harmonica, vocals on "I Shoulda Known Better"
- Paul Kaplan - producer
