= Farewells & Fantasies =

Compilation album by Phil Ochs
- Released: 1997
- Recorded: 1964–1970
- Genre: Folk
- Label: Elektra
- Producer: Gary Stewart, Michael Ochs, Meegan Lee Ochs

Phil Ochs chronology
Live at Newport (1996)	Farewells & Fantasies (1997)	American Troubadour (1997)

Farewells & Fantasies is the 1997 posthumous box set of the work of singer/songwriter Phil Ochs, chronicling his life and career in music from 1964 through 1970. With its non-chronological running order, it plays like three separate albums, each showcasing a different side of Ochs. The compilation was produced by Gary Stewart, Michael Ochs (Phil's brother) and Meegan Lee Ochs (Phil's daughter). Liner notes include a foreword by Meegan Lee Ochs, "The Sound of Freedom Callin'" by Michael Ventura and "Song of a Soldier: The Life and Times of Phil Ochs" by Mark Kemp, (Music News Editor of Rolling Stone,) track-by-track explanations by Ben Edmonds, discography, selected bibliography, and many photographs, some of which are from the family's private collections. The box set is dedicated to a friend, co-writer, and inspiration to Phil Ochs, Bob Gibson, who died while the box set was in production. Its title comes from the back of Ochs' LP Tape from California.

Professional ratings
Review scores
Source	Rating
Allmusic	4.5/5 stars

== Track listing ==
Disc One

1. "What's That I Hear?"
2. "The Bells"
3. "Morning" (previously unreleased)
4. "Bound for Glory"
5. "The Highwayman"
6. "The Power and the Glory"
7. "That's What I Want to Hear"
8. "Links On The Chain"
9. "Love Me, I'm a Liberal"
10. "Too Many Martyrs"
11. "In the Heat of the Summer"
12. "Here's to the State of Mississippi"
13. "I'm Going To Say It Now"
14. "One More Parade"
15. "Draft Dodger Rag"
16. "I Ain't Marching Anymore"
17. "We Seek No Wider War"
18. "Ringing of Revolution"
19. "When I'm Gone"
20. "Song of My Returning"
21. "There but for Fortune"

Disc Two

1. "The War Is Over"
2. "I Ain't Marching Anymore" (electric)
3. "White Boots Marching in a Yellow Land"
4. "Is There Anybody Here"
5. "Santo Domingo"
6. "Song of a Soldier" (unreleased)
7. "Cops of the World"
8. "Bracero"
9. "Canons of Christianity"
10. "I Kill Therefore I Am"
11. "The Confession" (unreleased)
12. "William Butler Yeats Visits Lincoln Park and Escapes Unscathed"
13. "A Toast to Those Who Are Gone"
14. "Changes"
15. "The Doll House"
16. "When in Rome"

Disc Three

1. "Pretty Smart on My Part"
2. "The World Began in Eden and Ended in Los Angeles" (live)
3. "Tape From California" (live)
4. "Chords of Fame"
5. "Gas Station Women"
6. "Miranda"
7. "Outside of a Small Circle of Friends"
8. "Cross My Heart"
9. "Flower Lady"
10. "The Scorpion Departs but Never Returns"
11. "Pleasures of the Harbor"
12. "Jim Dean Of Indiana"
13. "Rehearsals for Retirement"
14. "Doesn't Lenny Live Here Anymore"
15. "No More Songs"
16. "Crucifixion" (live)
