= One Way Ticket Home =

1970 song by Phil Ochs

Song by Phil Ochs

from the album Greatest Hits
- Published: 1970
- Released: 1970
- Genre: Rock
- Length: 2:39
- Label: A&M
- Songwriter: Phil Ochs
- Producers: Van Dyke Parks and Andrew Wickham

"One Way Ticket Home"
- Promotional copy of "One Way Ticket Home"

Single by Phil Ochs
- B-side: "My Kingdom for a Car"
- Released: 1972
- Genre: Rock
- Length: 2:39
- Label: A&M
- Songwriter: Phil Ochs
- Producer: Van Dyke Parks

Phil Ochs singles chronology
"My Life" (1969)	"One Way Ticket Home" (1972)	"Kansas City Bomber" (1973)

"One Way Ticket Home" is a 1970 song by Phil Ochs, an American singer-songwriter best known for the protest songs he wrote in the 1960s.

"One Way Ticket Home" is the first song on Greatest Hits, which—despite its title—was a collection of new songs. Musically, it signals a return by Ochs to his musical roots in country music and early rock and roll.

In the song, Ochs announces that he wants to buy a "one-way ticket home". Inspired by a recent Elvis concert in Las Vegas, Ochs declares "Elvis Presley is the king/I was at his crowning." But something is wrong: "My life just flashed before my eyes/I must be drowning." Referring to the political climate in the United States, Ochs says he "would be in exile now/But everywhere's the same" and decides he wants a "one-way ticket home".
