= Tape from California =

Studio album by Phil Ochs
- Released: July 1968
- Recorded: early 1968
- Genres: Folk, rock, pop
- Length: 46:55
- Label: A&M
- Producer: Larry Marks

Phil Ochs chronology
Pleasures of the Harbor (1967)	Tape from California (1968)	Rehearsals for Retirement (1969)

Tape from California is Phil Ochs' fifth album, released in July 1968 on A&M Records.

Professional ratings
Review scores
Source	Rating
Rolling Stone	negative
Allmusic	3/5 stars

== Track listing ==
All songs by Phil Ochs.

Side One

1. "Tape From California" – 6:45
2. "White Boots Marching in a Yellow Land" – 3:35
3. "Half A Century High" – 2:53
4. "Joe Hill" – 7:18
5. "The War Is Over" – 4:25

Side Two

1. "The Harder They Fall" – 3:52
2. "When In Rome" – 13:13
3. "Floods of Florence" – 4:52

== Personnel ==
- Phil Ochs - guitar, vocals
- Larry Marks - producer
- Joe Osborn - bass guitar on "Tape From California"
- Lincoln Mayorga - piano, keyboards
- Van Dyke Parks - piano, keyboards on "Tape From California"
- Ramblin' Jack Elliott - flat-picked guitar on "Joe Hill"
- Ian Freebairn-Smith - arrangements
