= Greatest Hits (Phil Ochs album) =

Studio album by Phil Ochs
- Released: February 1970
- Recorded: late 1969
- Genre: Country, rock, orchestral, folk
- Length: 37:43
- Label: A&M
- Producer: Van Dyke Parks, Andrew Wickham

Phil Ochs chronology
Rehearsals for Retirement (1969)	Greatest Hits (1970)	Gunfight at Carnegie Hall (1975)

Professional ratings
Review scores
Source	Rating
Allmusic	3/5 stars
Christgau's Record Guide	B−

Greatest Hits is Phil Ochs' seventh album and the final studio album released in his lifetime, released in 1970 on A&M Records. Contrary to its title, it offered ten new tracks of material, mostly produced by Van Dyke Parks. The album was reportedly the lowest selling of Ochs' career.

== Music and lyrics ==
Focusing more on country music than any other album in Ochs' canon, the album included members of The Byrds and Elvis Presley's backing group, alongside mainstays Lincoln Mayorga and Bob Rafkin. His lyrics were at their most self-referential, with only one overtly political song appearing, "Ten Cents A Coup," which included a spoken introduction strung together from two anti-war rallies. The song is an ironic tribute to Richard Nixon and Spiro Agnew, who Ochs wryly suggests are more laughable than Laurel and Hardy.

Among the self-referential tracks was "Chords of Fame", which warned against the dangers of cult of personality. "Boy in Ohio" saw Ochs looking back nostalgically at his childhood. "Jim Dean of Indiana" is a tribute to James Dean's life, written after Ochs had visited Dean's grave. "No More Songs" was the most telling, as Ochs would release only five more studio tracks in his lifetime after 1970, never completing another studio album.

== Cover ==
The cover of the album is an homage to Elvis Presley's 1959 album 50,000,000 Elvis Fans Can't Be Wrong. The back cover of Greatest Hits featured the phrase "50 Phil Ochs Fans Can't Be Wrong". Ochs wore a gold lamé suit inspired by similar suits made famous by Presley, and hired Nudie Cohn, who made Presley's suits, to make his.

During his show at Carnegie Hall, which was recorded to be released as a live album, Ochs told the audience a story explaining his choice to wear the suit. He told them he had died in Chicago, in reference to the violence he witnessed during the protests at the 1968 Democratic National Convention. He said God gave him a chance to come back to earth as anyone he wanted and Ochs chose Presley, adding that if there was any hope for America it "relies on getting Elvis Presley to become Che Guevara". The suit is now part of the Phil Ochs archives at the Woody Guthrie Center in Tulsa, Oklahoma.

== Track listing ==
All songs by Phil Ochs.

Side One

1. "One Way Ticket Home" – 2:40
2. "Jim Dean of Indiana" – 5:05
3. "My Kingdom For A Car" – 2:53
4. "Boy In Ohio" – 3:43
5. "Gas Station Women" – 3:31

Side Two

1. "Chords of Fame" – 3:33
2. "Ten Cents A Coup" – 3:14
3. "Bach, Beethoven, Mozart and Me" – 5:05
4. "Basket in the Pool" – 3:40
5. "No More Songs" – 4:31

== Personnel (partial list) ==
- Phil Ochs - guitar, piano, harmonica, vocals
- Van Dyke Parks - producer, keyboards
- Andrew Wickham - co-producer on "Gas Station Women" and "Chords of Fame"
- Clarence White - guitar, backing vocals
- Laurindo Almeida - guitar
- James Burton - guitar
- Bob Rafkin - guitar, bass
- Chris Ethridge - bass
- Kenny Kaufman - bass
- Gene Parsons - drums
- Kevin Kelley - drums
- Earl Ball - piano, arrangements
- Lincoln Mayorga - keyboards
- Mike Rubini - keyboards
- Richard Rosmini - pedal steel, harmonica
- Ry Cooder - mandolin on "One Way Ticket Home"
- Don Rich - fiddle
- Gary Coleman - percussion
- Tom Scott - tenor saxophone
- Bobby Bruce - violin
- Anne Goodman - cello
- Merry Clayton, Sherlie Matthews and Clydie King - backing vocals
- Bobby Wayne and Jim Glover - harmony vocals
- Bob Thompson - arrangements
