= Love Me, I'm a Liberal =

Song by Phil Ochs

from the album Phil Ochs in Concert
- Published: 1965
- Released: 1966
- Genre: Topical song, folk
- Length: 4:33
- Label: Elektra
- Songwriter: Phil Ochs
- Producers: Jac Holzman and Mark Abramson

"Love Me, I'm a Liberal" is a satirical political song by Phil Ochs, an American singer-songwriter. Originally released on his 1966 live album, Phil Ochs in Concert, "Love Me, I'm a Liberal" was soon one of Ochs's most popular concert staples.

Introducing the song on the live album, Ochs said:

In every American community there are varying shades of political opinion. One of the shadiest of these is the liberals. An outspoken group on many subjects, ten degrees to the left of center in good times, ten degrees to the right of center if it affects them personally. Here, then, is a lesson in safe logic.

"Love Me, I'm a Liberal" is sung from the perspective of an American liberal. In the first verse, the singer laments the assassinations of Medgar Evers and President John F. Kennedy, but says Malcolm X got what he deserved. Each verse ends with the refrain, "So love me, love me, love me, I'm a liberal." In the song's other verses, the singer says he supports the Civil Rights Movement and "love[s] Puerto Ricans and Negros as long as they don't move next door", but adds that if somebody suggests busing the singer's children to integrate their schools, he "hope[s] the cops take down [their] name". In the final verse, the narrator reveals that he used to be like the listener:

Sure, once I was young and impulsive; I wore every conceivable pin,
Even went to Socialist meetings, learned all the old Union hymns.
Ah, but I've grown older and wiser, and that's why I'm turning you in.
So love me, love me, love me, I'm a liberal.

According to Ochs' biographer Michael Schumacher, "Love Me, I'm a Liberal" would evoke "a strange mixture of laughter, from nervous twittering from those who recognized themselves in Phil's indictment, to open roars of approval from the radical factions in the audience." Eric Alterman describes "Love Me, I'm a Liberal" as "a scorching indictment of liberal cowardice by a bitter adversary, not the good-natured ribbing one might expect from an affectionate ally".

In 2018, Billy Bragg wrote of "Love Me, I'm a Liberal": "As with all such finely honed topical songs, the cultural references have dated somewhat. However, Ochs's description of a liberal as someone whose politics are '10 degrees to the left of centre in good times, 10 degrees to the right of centre if it affects them personally' still resonates today." Journalist and musician Miri Verona wrote that the song "satirized 'virtue-signalling' before that phrase even entered our zeitgeist", adding that "It’s clear that Ochs understood what virtue–signalling looks like and the damage it causes in our world, and wants his listeners to contemplate this, too."

== Cover versions ==
Several cover versions of "Love Me, I'm a Liberal" have been recorded, almost always with updated lyrics. Performers include Jello Biafra and Mojo Nixon, Kevin Devine, Gerd Schinkel, Evan Greer, John Yannis, Nacho Vegas, Oscar Brand, Carly Cosgrove and Chris T-T.
