= Rehearsals for Retirement =

Studio album by Phil Ochs
- Released: May 16, 1969
- Recorded: 1968–69
- Studios: A&M Studios, Los Angeles
- Genre: Folk rock
- Length: 38:54
- Label: A&M
- Producer: Larry Marks

Phil Ochs chronology
Tape from California (1968)	Rehearsals for Retirement (1969)	Greatest Hits (1970)

Rehearsals for Retirement is Phil Ochs's sixth studio album, released in 1969 on A&M Records.

== Background ==
Recorded in the aftermath of Ochs's presence at the 1968 Democratic National Convention in Chicago (where Ochs claimed to have witnessed the symbolic "death of America") it is often considered to be the darkest of Ochs's albums, exemplified not just by the lyrical matter but also by its cover: a tombstone sardonically proclaiming that Ochs had died in Chicago.

Rehearsals for Retirement saw Ochs exploring folk rock, incorporating orchestral accompaniments and electric guitar into his music. According to English studies scholar David Pichaske, songs such as "Pretty Smart on My Part" and "The Scorpion Departs but Never Returns" functioned as "art-protest songs". Pichaske interpreted the narrative of the former as a psychological analysis finding insecurity to be the source of violence in the United States. The latter song used the 1968 disappearance of the Scorpion nuclear submarine as an allegory for a modern "Lost Generation" who abandon the U.S. in response to the Vietnam War.

== Reception ==
Professional ratings
Review scores
Source	Rating
AllMusic	3/5 stars
The Village Voice	B

Rehearsals for Retirement was amongst the poorest-selling of all of Ochs's albums released during his lifetime, having been deleted from the A&M Records catalog before sales of 20,000 units had occurred.

Reviewing for The Village Voice in 1969, Robert Christgau said the musical arrangements are "excellent and work for [Ochs'] voice". While observing "some predictable bummers", Christgau highlighted two flashes of greatness with "The Scorpion Departs But Never Returns" and "Another Age".

In 1998, The Wire included Rehearsals for Retirement in their list of "100 Records That Set the World on Fire (While No One Was Listening)", where the staff praised it "the single most eloquent collection of protest songs in the English language." They further described it as a song cycle where "the political gives way to the existential", with a combination of "angry disillusion and impassioned optimism" that is "entirely disarming." William Ruhlmann, in a retrospective review for AllMusic, felt the album imbued Ochs' poetic sense with "the conflicts of the times", and noted how, with regard to Ochs' 1976 suicide, "it is impossible not to see the evidence of the songwriter's personal anguish in Rehearsals for Retirement.

== Track listing ==
All songs by Phil Ochs.

=== Side one ===
1. "Pretty Smart on My Part" – 3:18
2. "The Doll House" – 4:39
3. "I Kill Therefore I Am" – 2:55
4. "William Butler Yeats Visits Lincoln Park and Escapes Unscathed" - 2:55
5. [Untitled] (titled "Chicago" on some versions) – 0:29
6. "My Life" – 3:12

=== Side two ===
1. "The Scorpion Departs but Never Returns" – 4:15
2. "The World Began in Eden and Ended in Los Angeles" – 3:06
3. "Doesn't Lenny Live Here Anymore?" – 6:11
4. "Another Age" – 3:42
5. "Rehearsals for Retirement" – 4:09

== Personnel ==
- Phil Ochs – guitar, vocals
- Larry Marks – producer
- Lincoln Mayorga – piano, accordion
- Bob Rafkin – guitar, bass
- Kevin Kelley – drums (rumored)
- Ian Freebairn-Smith – arrangements
