= Pleasures of the Harbor =

Studio album by Phil Ochs
- Released: October 31, 1967
- Recorded: mid-to-late 1967
- Genres: Baroque pop; folk; art pop; Dixieland; pop
- Length: 51:27
- Label: A&M
- Producer: Larry Marks

Phil Ochs chronology
| Phil Ochs in Concert (1966) | Pleasures of the Harbor (1967) | Tape from California (1968) |

Pleasures of the Harbor is Phil Ochs' fourth full-length album and his first for A&M Records, released in 1967. In contrast to his three albums for Elektra Records which had all been acoustic folk music, Pleasures of the Harbor featured traces of classical, rock and roll, Dixieland jazz and experimental synthesized music crossing with folk.

== History ==
The best known track is "Outside of a Small Circle of Friends", a sarcastic jab at the apathetic nature of people in certain situations, at its base the story of the Murder of Kitty Genovese in New York City (which numerous people witnessed, doing nothing to help), set to a Dixieland backing. The mention of marijuana in one verse was misinterpreted, and its release as a single failed to do anything on the charts as it was banned from radio play by many stations.

"The Party" savaged high-class snobs, with Ochs taking the role of a lounge pianist, observing the ridiculous nature of their gatherings. "Flower Lady" was a six-minute narrative about contrasting characters in the city, with each anecdote having one thing in common; everyone ignores the poor woman trying to sell her flowers.

"Pleasures of the Harbor", the title track, is a dirge to lonely sailors seeking human comfort and connection while in port. Ochs composed it after watching a screening of John Ford's 1940 film The Long Voyage Home, which starred one of Ochs' movie idols, John Wayne. It features a lilting melodic line and what some consider to be an overblown film score-like orchestration (supposedly including a young Warren Zevon), a view which Ochs himself would later on come to share.

This recording of "The Crucifixion", which closed the album, was deemed a failed experiment by Ochs, as far as its avant-garde production experiment (by Joseph Byrd) is concerned. Lyrically and musically, however, many consider the song to be Ochs' masterpiece. Its ten verses compare John F. Kennedy and Christ, and explore the "cycle of sacrifice" where we build up our leaders into heroes so that we can enjoy tearing them down. The song is said to have brought Kennedy's brother Robert to tears when Ochs performed it for him a cappella in early 1968, months before the younger Kennedy's own assassination. All live versions of the song performed in concert featured Ochs alone, with just his guitar and voice, and one of those live performances is on the posthumously released compilations Chords of Fame and Farewells & Fantasies.

Professional ratings
Review scores
| Source | Rating |
|---|---|
| AllMusic | 5/5 stars |

== Track listing ==
All songs by Phil Ochs.

Side one

1. "Cross My Heart" – 3:23
2. "Flower Lady" – 6:06
3. "Outside of a Small Circle of Friends" – 3:37
4. "I've Had Her" – 8:03
5. "Miranda" – 5:17

Side two

1. "The Party" – 7:57
2. "Pleasures of the Harbor" – 8:05
3. "The Crucifixion" – 8:45

== Personnel ==
- Phil Ochs – vocals, guitar
- Larry Marks – producer
- Lincoln Mayorga – piano
- Warren Zevon – guitar on "Pleasures of the Harbor"
- Ian Freebairn-Smith – arrangements
- Joseph Byrd – arrangements on "The Crucifixion"
