= I Ain't Marching Any More =

Studio album by Phil Ochs
- Released: 1965
- Recorded: 1964
- Genre: Folk
- Length: 50:54
- Label: Elektra
- Producers: Jac Holzman and Paul A. Rothchild

Phil Ochs chronology
All the News That's Fit to Sing (1964)	I Ain't Marching Any More (1965)	Phil Ochs in Concert (1966)

I Ain't Marching Any More is Phil Ochs' second LP, released on Elektra Records in 1965.

== History ==
Ochs performs alone on twelve original songs, an interpretation of Alfred Noyes' "The Highwayman" set to music (much as Poe's "The Bells" had been set to music on the previous album) and a cover of Ewan MacColl's "The Ballad of the Carpenter".

Of the twelve originals, probably the most noted was the title track, with its distinctive trilling guitar part, that spoke of a soldier sick of fighting. Also of note was the album closer, "Here's to the State of Mississippi", a biting criticism of that state's lack of civil rights and generally bigoted attitude. Other important songs include "Draft Dodger Rag" (assailing those "red blooded Americans" who were in favor of US participation in the Vietnam War but did not fight because they were just summertime soldiers and sunshine patriots), "That Was The President" (a tribute to John F. Kennedy written soon after his assassination), "Talking Birmingham Jam" (which used the traditional talking blues form to assail the racist leaders of Birmingham) and "Links on the Chain" (attacking labor unions for excluding African-Americans and failing to support civil rights).

Ochs showed great thematic versatility on the album, including not just blatantly anti-war or protest songs but also poetry (Alfred Noyes, John Rooney, and Ewan MacColl) and songs less in lock-step with the contemporary American radical left. He noted, for instance, in the liner notes that his Marxist friends couldn't understand why he wrote "That Was the President," dryly adding that that was one of the reasons he wasn't a Marxist. However, Ochs backed away from the song's hero worship of John F. Kennedy by explaining that "after the assassination, Fidel Castro aptly pointed out that only fools could rejoice at such a tragedy, for systems, not men, are the enemy." Ochs showed more socialist sympathies with the songs "The Men Behind the Guns" and "Ballad of the Carpenter," with its memorable lyric "Jesus was a working man." (Ochs wrote in the liner notes that "songs like this" were one of the reasons the State Department blocked Ewan MacColl from entering the U.S., adding that this was unwise given "the quality of culture in America.")

Among more traditional protest songs, the most pointed might be "Iron Lady," about the death penalty, with the memorable line "And a rich man never died upon the chair." (The "iron lady" in the title referred to the electric chair.) Ochs wrote that "in the future, intelligent men will read in amazement about the murder of Caryl Chessman." But hard-hitting songs like that and the title song were softened with sentimental and even romantic songs like "That Was the President" and Noyes' "The Highway Man." And while critical, songs like "Draft Dodger Rag" and "Talking Birmingham Jam" used humor rather than harsh rhetoric to make their points. Commenting on "Draft Dodger Rag," Ochs compared the Viet Cong soldier who screamed his hatred of Americans while being shot by a firing squad, to his American counterpart who stayed "up nights thinking of ways to" escape the army.

On the 2001 CD reissue, an alternative electric version of "I Ain't Marching Any More" follows "Here's to the State of Mississippi". Released as the A-side of a British 45, it had previously appeared in the United States on the 1976 compilation Chords of Fame and the 1997 box set Farewells & Fantasies, both out-of-print.

Professional ratings
Review scores
Source	Rating
AllMusic	4.5/5 stars
PItchfork	8.5/10

== Track listing ==
All songs by Phil Ochs unless otherwise noted.

1. "I Ain't Marching Any More" – 2:37
2. "In the Heat of the Summer" – 3:08
3. "Draft Dodger Rag" – 2:13
4. "That's What I Want to Hear" – 3:10
5. "That Was the President" – 3:26
6. "Iron Lady" – 3:37
7. "The Highwayman" (Alfred Noyes, with musical interpretation by Phil Ochs) – 5:42
8. "Links on the Chain" – 4:20
9. "Hills of West Virginia" – 3:21
10. "The Men Behind the Guns" (John Rooney, with musical interpretation by Phil Ochs) – 3:03
11. "Talking Birmingham Jam" – 3:13
12. "The Ballad of the Carpenter" (Ewan MacColl) – 3:54
13. "Days of Decision" – 3:14
14. "Here's to the State of Mississippi" – 6:02
15. "I Ain't Marching Any More" (electric version) – 2:50 +
- + = bonus track on 2002 CD reissue

== Personnel ==
- Phil Ochs – vocals, guitar
- Jac Holzman – production supervisor
- Paul A. Rothchild – recording director
- with the Blues Project:
  - Roy Blumenfeld – drums on "I Ain't Marching Any More" (electric version)
  - Danny Kalb – guitar on "I Ain't Marching Any More" (electric version)
  - Steve Katz – guitar on "I Ain't Marching Any More" (electric version)
  - Andy Kulberg – bass on "I Ain't Marching Any More" (electric version)
  - Al Kooper – piano on "I Ain't Marching Any More" (electric version)
