= The War Is Over (Phil Ochs song) =

1968 single by Phil Ochs

Song by Phil Ochs

from the album Tape from California
- Published: 1968
- Released: 1968
- Genre: Protest song
- Length: 4:25
- Label: A&M
- Songwriter: Phil Ochs
- Producer: Larry Marks

"The War Is Over"

Single by Phil Ochs
- B-side: "The Harder They Fall"
- Released: 1968
- Genre: Protest song
- Length: 2:45
- Label: A&M
- Songwriter: Phil Ochs
- Producer: Larry Marks

Phil Ochs singles chronology
"Outside of a Small Circle of Friends" (1967)	"The War Is Over" (1968)	"My Life" (1969)

"The War Is Over" is an anti-war song by Phil Ochs, an American protest singer in the 1960s and early 1970s. Ochs was famous for harshly criticizing the Vietnam War and the American military-industrial establishment. The song, which was originally released on Tape from California (1968), has been described as "one of the most potent anti-war songs of the 1960s".

One of Ochs' biographers wrote that "The War Is Over" is his "greatest act of bravery as a topical songwriter".

== Background ==
American involvement in the Vietnam War escalated significantly during 1966. The number of American troops fighting in Vietnam increased that year from 184,000 to 450,000.

In 1966, poet Allen Ginsberg decided to declare that the Vietnam War was over. The idea of ending the war simply by declaring it over appealed to Ochs, who organized a rally in Los Angeles to announce that the war was over. To publicize the rally, he wrote an article in the Los Angeles Free Press titled "Have Faith, The War Is Over":

Is everybody sick of this stinking war? In that case, friends, do what I and thousands of other Americans have done — declare the war over.

Ochs wrote a song for the rally, in which he, like "thousands of other Americans", declared the war was over.

== The song ==
"The War Is Over" alludes to war films and their heroes and asks "what's this got to do with me?" The song describes anti-war protesters as "angry artists painting angry signs" who have become "poisoned players" in a cycle of endless anti-war demonstrations that have failed to end the war. The song mockingly suggests that young men enlist in the army to "serve your country in her suicide", but adds that "just before the end even treason might be worth a try — this country is too young to die". Each verse of the song ends with variations on the words, "I declare the war is over, it's over, it's over".

Ochs recorded "The War Is Over" for his fifth album, Tape from California. The musical arrangement, by Bob Thompson, incorporates martial beats, brass horns, and flutes. The opening is a theme from the National Emblem March by Edwin Eugene Bagley. Other parts of the arrangement include quotes from John Philip Sousa's patriotic march "Stars and Stripes Forever", implying that opposition to the Vietnam War was patriotic. As the song fades out, the horns play part of Ochs's own "I Ain't Marching Anymore".

== Notable performances ==
Ochs first performed the song in public at the "War Is Over" rally in Los Angeles on June 23, 1967. "The War Is Over" became one of Ochs' best-known songs. He performed before 150,000 demonstrators in front of the Lincoln Memorial in Washington, D.C., on October 21, 1967.

In November, Ochs planned a "War Is Over" rally in New York. After Ochs sang "The War Is Over", several thousand demonstrators marched from Washington Square Park to Times Square and then to the United Nations.

In August 1968, Ochs performed "The War Is Over" during the protests at the Democratic National Convention in Chicago, inspiring hundreds of young men to burn their draft cards. When Ochs sang the line "even treason might be worth a try — this country is too young to die", he was interrupted by five minutes of cheering. He couldn't finish the song and had to leave the stage.

On August 28, 1969, Ochs sang the song at Chicago's Grant Park Bandshell on the first anniversary of the Democratic Convention's "The whole world is watching" police riot.

The Vietnam War ended on April 30, 1975, when North Vietnam and the Vietcong captured Saigon the final piece of territory controlled by South Vietnam, and a final "War Is Over" rally was held in New York's Central Park on May 11. At the rally, Ochs sang "The War Is Over" in public for the last time.

On July 28, 2016 Lady Gaga performed the song during a private concert for delegates in Camden, New Jersey, as part of the 2016 Democratic National Convention festivities in support for then-presidential candidate Hillary Clinton.

== Single release ==
A&M Records released "The War Is Over" as a single in 1968. The B-side of the single was "The Harder They Fall", another song from Tape from California. The version of "The Harder They Fall" on the single is a rock version of the song that has never been released on any album or compilation.

== See also ==
- "Happy Xmas (War Is Over)" – 1971 song by John Lennon and Yoko Ono
- List of anti-war songs
