= Phil Ochs in Concert =

Live album by Phil Ochs
- Released: March 1966
- Recorded: Late 1965 – early 1966
- Venue: Jordan Hall (Boston); Judson Hall (New York City)
- Genre: Folk
- Length: 43:07
- Label: Elektra
- Producer: Mark Abramson; Jac Holzman

Phil Ochs chronology
I Ain't Marching Anymore (1965)	Phil Ochs in Concert (1966)	Pleasures of the Harbor (1967)

Phil Ochs in Concert is Phil Ochs' third long player, released in 1966 on Elektra Records. Despite its title, it was not entirely live, as several tracks were actually re-recorded, owing to flaws in the live recordings made in Boston and New York City in late 1965 and early 1966. The album's producers retained the essence of a live album by including song patter and audience reactions between and during the songs. Phil Ochs in Concert features many of the folksinger's most enduring songs and represents the culmination of Ochs' folk career, the last of his original albums to be all-acoustic.

== Songs ==
"There but for Fortune", which opens side two of the LP, is perhaps the best-known track. A minor hit for Joan Baez (whom Ochs jokingly credits with its authoring on the CD release—the remark was edited out of the album master), this song encourages people to count themselves as fortunate, as fate takes its toll on those with broken lives who might have turned out differently under other circumstances, and makes the point that negative things can happen to anyone.

Perhaps the second most known track, "Love Me, I'm a Liberal", is a sarcastic take on the fair-weather politics of mainstream American liberals. It has been covered (often with updated lyrics) many times since its initial release.

The album features one of Ochs' few love songs, "Changes", an image-filled, impressionistic ballad lamenting the loss of his life with someone he loves. "Bracero" is a scathing attack on the plight of migrant workers who cross the border from Mexico to work for a pittance. (Neil Young, who has acknowledged the influence of Ochs' songs in interviews and to Ochs directly, borrowed the first six notes of "Bracero"'s melody for his song "Like a Hurricane".) "Canons of Christianity" attacks the hypocrisy of church teachings and leaders. "Cops of the World" paints a portrait of America as invaders who impose their values and ways of life on the world, doing anything they please and expecting everyone to comply. "Santo Domingo" depicts the 1965-66 U.S. occupation of the Dominican Republic as a ruthless imperialist adventure. "Ringing of Revolution" presents a utopian vision of proletarian conquest and marks one of the earliest recorded political references to Ronald Reagan in music.

The album's opening song, "I'm Going to Say It Now", is written in the voice of an idealistic college student toward adults running the school, forcefully but respectfully asserting his right to speak his mind. And the final song, "When I'm Gone," is a prescient, sad ode to the shortness of life and the need to fight for social justice while you can.

Professional ratings
Review scores
Source	Rating
AllMusic	3/5 stars

== Track listing ==
All songs written by Phil Ochs.

Side one

1. "I'm Going to Say It Now" – 2:46
2. "Bracero" – 3:57
3. "Ringing of Revolution" – 5:30
4. "Is There Anybody Here?" – 3:17
5. "Canons of Christianity" – 4:22

Side two

1. "There but for Fortune" – 2:35
2. "Cops of the World" – 4:45
3. "Santo Domingo" – 3:48
4. "Changes" – 4:30
5. "Love Me, I'm a Liberal" – 3:46
6. "When I'm Gone" – 3:51

== Personnel ==
According to the LP's liner notes, except where noted:

- Phil Ochs – vocals, guitar

Production

- Mark Abramson – producer
- Jac Holzman – producer
- David B. Jones – engineer

Additional personnel

- Joel Brodsky – photography (liner photo)
- William S. Harvey – art direction (cover design)
- Dan Kramer – photography

== See also ==
- Ronald Reagan in music
