= Power and the Glory =

1974 song composed and sung by Phil Ochs

Song by Phil Ochs

from the album All the News That's Fit to Sing
- Published: 1963
- Released: 1964
- Genre: Folk
- Length: 2:15
- Label: Elektra
- Songwriter(s): Phil Ochs
- Producer(s): Jac Holzman

"Power and the Glory"

Single by Phil Ochs
- B-side: "Here's to the State of Richard Nixon"
- Released: 1974
- Genre: Fife and drum
- Length: 3:05
- Label: A&M
- Songwriter(s): Phil Ochs
- Producer(s): Phil Ochs and Arthur Gorson

Phil Ochs singles chronology
"Bwatue" (1973)	"Power and the Glory" (1974)

"Power and the Glory" (sometimes titled "The Power and the Glory") is an American patriotic song by Phil Ochs, a U.S. protest singer from the 1960s known for being a harsh critic of the American military and industrial establishment. Originally released on his 1964 debut album, All the News That's Fit to Sing, "Power and the Glory" is said to have contributed to Ochs' profound impact.

== History ==
Singer/songwriter Phil Ochs is said to have "spent half his adult life dodging FBI microphones hidden in his soup." By 1963, Ochs was not well thought of by the U.S. government and was deemed one of the harshest critics of the American military and industrial establishment. In that same year, Ochs began writing "Power and the Glory," a song that honors the way of life that America symbolized to the world. While composing the song, Ochs told his sister Sonny that he was writing "the greatest song I'll ever write".

The song has been described as an "anthem ... with lyrics that might have been written by the great Woody Guthrie". Said to be the American patriotic hymn best at combining the American dream with selfless Christian ideals "Power and the Glory" consists of three verses, each followed by a chorus. The first verse invites the listener to walk with the singer, and it describes some of the natural wonders of the United States. The second verse names some of the states through which the listener and the singer would travel. The third verse notes that the United States is "only as rich as the poorest of the poor" but also as "strong as our love for this land". The chorus of "Power and the Glory" describes the United States as "a land full of power and glory":

Here's a land full of power and glory
Beauty that words cannot recall
Oh her power shall rest on the strength of her freedom,
Her glory shall rest on us all.

A fourth verse, not added to the final production release, but found in a bootleg demo recording and confirmed by Ochs' sister Sonny, contains a call to action:

Yet our land is still troubled by men who have to hate
They twist away our freedom and they twist away our fate
Fear is their weapon and treason is their cry.
We can stop them if we try.

== Legacy ==
"Power and the Glory" is said to have contributed to Ochs' profound impact. "Power and the Glory" also has been covered by many performers, including Theodore Bikel, Anita Bryant, Ronnie Gilbert, Pete Seeger, The Limeliters, Clem Tholet, and the U.S. Army Soldiers Chorus. Ochs, who was a leftist, was particularly amused by Bryant's cover because of her right-wing political views. In 1974 Ochs re-recorded the song in a new arrangement, with a fife and drum accompaniment, that was influenced by Bryant's version. Ochs' 1974 version was released as a single. In 2018, Billy Bragg wrote that "Power and the Glory" "should be sung in schools across America".
