= Draft Dodger Rag =

1966 single by Phil Ochs

Song by Phil Ochs

from the album I Ain't Marching Anymore
- Published: 1964
- Released: 1965
- Genre: Protest song, folk
- Length: 2:07
- Label: Elektra
- Songwriter: Phil Ochs
- Producer: Jac Holzman

"The Draft Dodger Rag"

Single by Pete Seeger

from the album Dangerous Songs!?
- B-side: "Guantanamera"
- Released: 1966
- Genre: Country folk
- Length: 2:10
- Label: Columbia
- Songwriter: Phil Ochs
- Producer: John Hammond

Pete Seeger singles chronology
"Healing River" (1965)	"The Draft Dodger Rag" (1966)	"Waist Deep in the Big Muddy" (1967)

"Draft Dodger Rag" is a satirical anti-war song by Phil Ochs, a U.S. protest singer from the 1960s known for being a harsh critic of the American military industrial complex. Originally released on his 1965 album, I Ain't Marching Anymore, "Draft Dodger Rag" quickly became an anthem of the anti-Vietnam War movement.

Ochs wrote "Draft Dodger Rag" as American involvement in the Vietnam War was beginning to grow. The song is sung from the perspective of a gung-ho young man who has been drafted. When he reports for duty, however, the young man recites a list of reasons why he cannot serve, including poor vision, flat feet, a ruptured spleen, allergies and asthma, back pain, addiction "to a thousand drugs", his college enrollment, his job in a defense plant, his disabled aunt, and the fact that he "always carries a purse." (One historian of the draft resistance movement wrote that Ochs "described nearly every available escape from conscription".) As the song ends, the young man tells the sergeant that he'll be the first to volunteer for "a war without blood and gore".

"Draft Dodger Rag" was the first prominent satirical song about draft evasion in the Vietnam War. One writer says its humor can be appreciated on its own level, without respect to the political message of the song. Another says it added "much-needed humour" to the protest song genre.

Ochs wrote of the song:

In Vietnam, a 19-year-old Vietcong soldier screams that Americans should leave his country as he is shot by a government firing squad. His American counterpart meanwhile is staying up nights thinking up ways to deceptively destroy his health, mind, or virility to escape two years in a relatively comfortable army. Free enterprise strikes again.

Ochs performed "Draft Dodger Rag" in 1965 on a CBS Evening News television special Avoiding the Draft, one of the rare instances in which he appeared on a national American television broadcast.

== The Smothers Brothers ==
On November 19, 1967, The Smothers Brothers Comedy Hour featured the Smothers Brothers and actor George Segal singing "Draft Dodger Rag". Dick Smothers introduced the song by saying it was about a "great effort" some young American men were making. Tom Smothers added that the song was about a problem and how it was being solved with "good old American ingenuity". They ended the song by proclaiming "Make love, not war!"

== Cover versions ==
Several performers beside the Smothers Brothers have covered "Draft Dodger Rag", including the Chad Mitchell Trio, The Four Preps, Kind of Like Spitting, Tom Paxton, David Rovics, and Pete Seeger. Seeger's version was released as a single.

== See also ==
- Draft dodger
- List of anti-war songs
