= I Ain't Marching Any More (song) =

1966 anti-war song by Phil Ochs

Song by Phil Ochs

from the album I Ain't Marching Any More
- Published: 1964
- Released: 1965
- Genre: Protest song, folk
- Length: 2:32
- Label: Elektra
- Songwriter: Phil Ochs
- Producer: Jac Holzman

"I Ain't Marching Any More"

Single by Phil Ochs
- B-side: "That Was the President"
- Released: 1966
- Genre: Protest song, folk rock
- Length: 2:47
- Label: Elektra
- Songwriter: Phil Ochs
- Producer: Paul A. Rothchild

Phil Ochs singles chronology
"I Ain't Marching Any More" (1966)	"Cross My Heart" (1967)

"I Ain't Marching Any More" (sometimes titled "I Ain't Marchin' Anymore" or "I Ain't A-Marching Anymore") is an anti-war song by Phil Ochs, a U.S. protest singer from the 1960s known for being a passionate critic of the American military industrial complex. Originally released on his 1965 album of the same name, "I Ain't Marching Any More" is one of Ochs's best-known songs.

Ochs wrote "I Ain't Marching Any More" as American involvement in the Vietnam War was beginning to grow. The song criticizes all of American military history from the perspective of a weary soldier who has been present at every single war since the War of 1812. The chorus notes that "it's always the old who lead us to the war, always the young to fall" and asks whether the price of military victory has been too high.

Ochs said of the song that it "borders between pacifism and treason, combining the best qualities of both." He also wrote "the fact that you won't be hearing this song on the radio is more than enough justification for the writing of it."

According to one biographer, "I Ain't Marching Any More" "instantly became [Ochs'] signature song". Ochs performed it at concerts and rallies for the remainder of his career, almost always drawing cheers from the audience.

Ochs performed the song in 1967 on the ABC television special Dissent or Treason, one of the rare instances in which he appeared on a national American television broadcast. In August 1968, Ochs performed "I Ain't Marching Any More" during the protests outside the Democratic National Convention, inspiring hundreds of young men to burn their draft cards. Ochs described it as the highlight of his career.

Ochs was subsequently called as a witness in the trial of the Chicago Seven, who were charged with conspiracy and other crimes related to the protests. The defense attorneys asked Ochs to sing "I Ain't Marching Any More", but the judge would not allow it. Instead, Ochs recited the lyrics.

In June 2026, CBS News included the song in its list of the 250 essential American songs of the past 250 years.

== Folk-rock version ==
In 1966, Ochs recorded a folk-rock version of "I Ain't Marching Any More". He was accompanied by The Blues Project and a bagpipe player. The new version of the song was released as a single in the U.K. and as a flexi disc in Sing Out! magazine. Critic Richie Unterberger wrote of the folk-rock version, "If ever there was a successful reworking of a plaintive acoustic song into a dynamic electric one, this ... was it". The single failed to chart.

== Cover versions ==
"I Ain't Marching Any More" has been covered by several performers, including:

- Black 47
- Eugene Chadbourne
- Four to the Bar
- Arlo Guthrie
- Jefferson Starship (with additional lyrics by Cathy Richardson)
- Kind of Like Spitting
- Richard Thompson

== See also ==
- List of anti-war songs
