= List of cover versions of Phil Ochs songs =

This is a list of cover versions by notable music artists of songs written by American singer-songwriter Phil Ochs, who wrote or recorded at least 238 songs during his brief career. In 1965, Joan Baez had a No. 8 hit in the UK with her cover of "There but for Fortune", a song written by Ochs. It was also nominated for a Grammy Award for "Best Folk Recording". In the US it peaked at No. 50 on the Billboard charts—a good showing, but not a hit.

Except where indicated, all songs were written by Ochs.

== Key ==
Denotes Ochs tribute album.

== List ==
Artist	Country of origin	Year	Song	Appearance	Notes
Lauren Agnelli, Dave Rave, and the Charmers	United States, Canada	1998	"Chords of Fame"	What's That I Hear?: The Songs of Phil Ochs	
Eric Andersen	United States	2005	"Changes"	Waves: Great American Song Series, Vol. 2	
Eric Andersen	United States	2004	"I Ain't Marching Anymore"	The Street Was Always There: Great American Song Series, Vol. 1	
Eric Andersen	United States	1998	"When I'm Gone"	What's That I Hear?: The Songs of Phil Ochs	
Eric Andersen	United States	2004	"White Boots Marching in a Yellow Land"	The Street Was Always There: Great American Song Series, Vol. 1	
Harvey Andrews	England	1978	"When I'm Gone"	Folk 78 BBC Radio 2 program	
The Back Porch Majority	United States	1966	"The Bells" (Note: Song written by Ochs. Lyrics adapted from the poem by Edgar Allan Poe.)	That's the Way It's Gonna Be	
The Back Porch Majority	United States	1966	"That's the Way It's Gonna Be" (Note: Song written by Ochs but professional recording not released during his lifetime.)	That's the Way It's Gonna Be	
Joan Baez	United States	1965	"There but for Fortune"	Joan Baez/5	
Joan Baez	United States	1969	"There but for Fortune"	Joan Baez in Italy	
Joan Baez	United States	1977	"There but for Fortune"	Bread & Roses Festival of Acoustic Music	
Dan Barker and Kristin Lems	United States	1987	"When I'm Gone"	My Thoughts Are Free	
Richard Barone	United States	2016	"When I'm Gone"	Sorrows & Promises: Greenwich Village in the 1960s	
Bastro	United States	1987	"Pretty Smart on My Part"	Diablo Guapo	
Lars Berghagen and Anni-Frid Lyngstad	Sweden	1971	"En Kväll om Sommarn" ("Changes")	Single	
Jello Biafra and Mojo Nixon	United States	1994	"Love Me, I'm a Liberal"	Prairie Home Invasion	
Theodore Bikel	Austria	1983	"Power and the Glory"	America's Music Legacy: Folk	
Black 47	United States	1999	"I Ain't Marching Anymore"	Bleecker Street: Greenwich Village in the ’60s	
Rachel Bissex	United States	2004	"No More Songs"	In White Light	
Cilla Black	England	1997 (Note: Recorded in 1974.)	"Changes"	The Abbey Road Decade 1963–1973	
Curt Boettcher	United States	2000 (Note: Recorded circa 1969.)	"That's the Way It's Gonna Be"	Misty Mirage	
Isabelle Boulay	Canada	2011	"Où Va la Chance?" ("There but for Fortune")	Les grands espaces	
Billy Bragg	England	1985	"Joe Hill"	Don't Mourn—Organize! Songs of Labor Songwriter Joe Hill	
Billy Bragg and the Pattersons	England, Ireland	1985	"Chords of Fame"	Andy Kershaw's BBC Radio 1 program	
The Brothers Four	United States	1967	"Changes"	A New World's Record	
Anita Bryant	United States	1966	"The Power and the Glory"	Mine Eyes Have Seen the Glory	
David Buskin	United States	1998	"Boy in Ohio"	What's That I Hear?: The Songs of Phil Ochs	
Exene Cervenka	United States	1991	"Do What I Have to Do"	Tame Yourself	
Chad & Jeremy	England	1965	"There but for Fortune"	I Don't Want to Lose You Baby	
Camper van Chadbourne	United States	2003	"I Kill Therefore I Am"	Poison Ochs: A Tribute to Phil Ochs	
Eugene Chadbourne	United States	1994	"Another Country"	Another Country (Note: Song also appears on Chadbourne's 1998 Ochs tribute album To Phil.)	
Eugene Chadbourne	United States	1998	"The Big Parade" ("One More Parade") (Note: Written by Ochs and Bob Gibson.)	To Phil	
Eugene Chadbourne	United States	1998	"Canons of Christianity"	To Phil	
Eugene Chadbourne	United States	1991	"Christian Canons" ("Canons of Christianity")	Chad-Born Again	
Eugene Chadbourne	United States	1986	"Cops of the World"	Corpses of Foreign War	
Eugene Chadbourne	United States	1991	"Cross My Heart"	Chad-Born Again	
Eugene Chadbourne	United States	1998	"Here's to the State of Mississippi"	To Phil	
Eugene Chadbourne	United States	1998	"I Ain't Marching Anymore"	To Phil	
Eugene Chadbourne	United States	1998	"I Kill Therefore I Am"	To Phil	
Eugene Chadbourne	United States	1998	"Is There Anybody Here"	To Phil	
Eugene Chadbourne	United States	1993	"Knock on the Door"	Songs	
Eugene Chadbourne	United States	1998	"Outside of a Small Circle of Friends"	To Phil	
Eugene Chadbourne	United States	1994	"Remember Me"	Another Country	
Eugene Chadbourne	United States	1998	"There but for Fortune"	To Phil	
Eugene Chadbourne	United States	1986	"When I'm Gone"	Country Protest	
Cher	United States	1967	"There but for Fortune"	With Love, Chér	
Vic Chesnutt	United States	1999	"The Scorpion Departs But Never Returns"	Athfest '98	
Gene Clark	United States	1990	"Changes"	True Voices	
Judy Collins	United States	1966	"In the Heat of the Summer"	Fifth Album	
John Denver	United States	1965	"What's That I Hear Now" ("What's That I Hear")	John Denver Sings	
Ani DiFranco	United States	2000	"When I'm Gone"	Swing Set	
Disappear Fear	United States	2011	"Changes"	Get Your Phil	
Disappear Fear	United States	2011	"Draft Dodger Rag"	Get Your Phil	
Disappear Fear	United States	2011	"I Ain't Marching Anymore"	Get Your Phil	
Disappear Fear	United States	2011	"Is There Anybody Here?"	Get Your Phil	
Disappear Fear	United States	2011	"I've Had Her"/"Because the Night" (Note: Cover of Patti Smith Group song. Written by Bruce Springsteen and Patti Smith.)	Get Your Phil	
Disappear Fear	United States	2011	"No More Songs"	Get Your Phil	
Disappear Fear	United States	2011	"Outside of a Small Circle of Friends"	Get Your Phil	
Disappear Fear	United States	2011	"Power and the Glory"	Get Your Phil	
Disappear Fear	United States	2011	"There but for Fortune"	Get Your Phil	
Disappear Fear	United States	2011	"When I'm Gone"	Get Your Phil	
Danny Doyle	Ireland	1981	"The Highwayman" (Note: Song written by Ochs. Lyrics adapted from the poem by Alfred Noyes.)	The Highwayman	
Marianne Faithfull	England	1985	"Chords of Fame"	Rich Kid Blues	
José Feliciano	Puerto Rico	1966	"That's the Way It's Gonna Be"	A Bag Full of Soul	
Julie Felix	United States	1968	"Bracero"	This World Goes Round & Round	
Julie Felix	United States	1966	"Changes"	Changes	
Julie Felix	United States	1965	"Days of Decision"	The Second Album	
Julie Felix	United States	1967	"The Flower Lady"	Flowers	
Leslie Fish	United States	1986	"No More Songs"	Chickasaw Mountain	
The Four Preps	United States	1967	"Draftdodger Rag"	Single	
The Four Seasons	United States	1964	"New Town"	Born to Wander	
Four to the Bar	United States	1994	"I Ain't Marching Anymore"	Craic on the Road: Live at Sam Maguire's	
Diamanda Galás	United States	1998	"Iron Lady"	Malediction and Prayer	
Dick Gaughan	Scotland	1988	"When I'm Gone"	Call It Freedom	
Bob Gibson	United States	1991	"Start the Parade" ("One More Parade")	Stops Along the Way	
Bob Gibson	United States	1988	"That's the Way It's Gonna Be"	Funky in the Country	
Ronnie Gilbert	United States	1964	"Power and Glory"	Alone with Ronnie Gilbert	
Ronnie Gilbert	United States	1964	"What's That I Hear"	Alone with Ronnie Gilbert	
Ronnie Gilbert and Holly Near	United States	1996	"Power and Glory"	This Train Still Runs	
Steve Gillette and Cindy Mangsen	United States	1998	"The Highwayman"	What's That I Hear?: The Songs of Phil Ochs	
Thea Gilmore	England	2004	"When I'm Gone"	Loft Music	
Jim Glover	United States	1984	"Hands"	Fast Folk Musical Magazine	
John Gorka	United States	1998	"Bracero"	What's That I Hear?: The Songs of Phil Ochs	
Greg Greenway	United States	2001	"The Crucifixion"	Something Worth Doing	
Greg Greenway	United States	1998	"Tape from California"	What's That I Hear?: The Songs of Phil Ochs	
Sid Griffin and Billy Bragg	United States, England	1998	"Sailors and Soldiers"	What's That I Hear?: The Songs of Phil Ochs	
Nanci Griffith	United States	2002	"What's That I Hear"	Winter Marquee	
Arlo Guthrie	United States	1998	"I Ain't Marching Anymore"	What's That I Hear?: The Songs of Phil Ochs	
George Hamilton IV	United States	1966	"Changes"	Steel Rail Blues	
John Wesley Harding	England	1998	"Another Age"	What's That I Hear?: The Songs of Phil Ochs	
Françoise Hardy	France	1968	"Où Va la Chance?" ("There but for Fortune")	Françoise Hardy	
Françoise Hardy	France	1968	"There but for Fortune"	En anglais	
Kim and Reggie Harris	United States	1995	"Changes"	Spoken in Love	
Kim and Reggie Harris	United States	1993	"In the Heat of the Summer"	In the Heat of the Summer	
Kim and Reggie Harris	United States	1997	"In the Heat of the Summer"	The Long Walk To Freedom Reunion Concert	
Kim and Reggie Harris	United States	1994	"Too Many Martyrs" (Note: Written by Ochs and Bob Gibson.)	Freedom Is a Constant Struggle: Songs of the Mississippi Civil Rights Movement	
Kim and Reggie Harris	United States	1997	"Too Many Martyrs"	The Long Walk To Freedom Reunion Concert	
Kim and Reggie Harris	United States	1998	"What's That I Hear"	What's That I Hear?: The Songs of Phil Ochs	
Kim and Reggie Harris, Magpie	United States	1998	"Freedom Riders"	What's That I Hear?: The Songs of Phil Ochs	
Henry Cow	England	2008	"No More Songs"	Stockholm & Göteborg	
Carolyn Hester	United States	1965	"What's That I Hear"	Carolyn Hester at Town Hall Two	
The Highwaymen	United States	1965	"What's That I Hear"	Stop! Look! & Listen!	
Anne Hills	United States	1998	"Iron Lady"	What's That I Hear?: The Songs of Phil Ochs	
Bob Hudson	Australia	1974	"No More Songs"	The Newcastle Song	
Ian & Sylvia	Canada	1966	"Changes"	Play One More	
Tom Intondi	United States	1995	"Flower Lady"	Tom Intondi Live!	
Jackie and Roy	United States	1966	"Changes"	Changes	
Jason & the Scorchers	United States	1989	"My Kingdom for a Car"	Thunder and Fire	
Wyclef Jean	Haiti	2009	"Here's to the State of Mississippi"	Soundtrack for a Revolution	
Jefferson Starship	United States	2008	"I Ain't Marching Anymore"	Jefferson's Tree of Liberty	
Jim and Jean	United States	1965	"The Bells"	Jim and Jean	
Jim and Jean	United States	1966	"Changes"	Changes	
Jim and Jean	United States	1968	"Cross My Heart"	People World	
Jim and Jean	United States	1966	"Crucifixion"	Changes	
Jim and Jean	United States	1966	"Flower Lady"	Changes	
Jim and Jean	United States	1968	"Rhythms of Revolution" ("Ringing of Revolution")	People World	
Jim and Jean	United States	1965	"There but for Fortune"	Jim and Jean	
Jim and Jean	United States	1963	"What's That I Hear"	Jack Linkletter Presents a Folk Festival	
Joe and Eddie	United States	1965	"That's the Way It's Gonna Be"	Live in Hollywood	
Joe and Eddie	United States	1964	"What's That I Hear"	Coast to Coast	
Daniel Johnston and Jad Fair	United States	2003	"Chords of Fame"	Poison Ochs: A Tribute to Phil Ochs	
Josh Joplin	United States	1991	"I Ain't Marching Anymore"	Facts of Fortune	
Josh Joplin Group	United States	2000	"Half a Century High"	"Camera One +2" single	
Kind of Like Spitting	United States	2005	"Draft Dodger Rag"	Learn: The Songs of Phil Ochs	
Kind of Like Spitting	United States	2005	"I Ain't Marching Anymore"	Learn: The Songs of Phil Ochs	
Kind of Like Spitting	United States	2005	"I'm Tired"	Learn: The Songs of Phil Ochs	
Kind of Like Spitting	United States	2005	"Outside of a Small Circle of Friends"	Learn: The Songs of Phil Ochs	
Kind of Like Spitting	United States	2005	"Remember Me"	Learn: The Songs of Phil Ochs	
Kind of Like Spitting	United States	2005	"That's What I Want to Hear"	Learn: The Songs of Phil Ochs	
Kind of Like Spitting	United States	2005	"When I'm Gone"	Learn: The Songs of Phil Ochs	
Kind of Like Spitting	United States	2005	"Where Were You in Chicago"	Learn: The Songs of Phil Ochs	
Kind of Like Spitting	United States	2005	"You Can't Get Stoned Enough"	Learn: The Songs of Phil Ochs	
Lady Gaga	United States	2016	"The War Is Over"	"Camden Rising", 2016 Democratic National Convention	
Mike Leander Orchestra	England	1965	"There but for Fortune"	The Folk Hits	
Jeannie Lewis	Australia	1976	"The Crucifixion"	Tears of Steel & The Clowning Cavaleras	
Gordon Lightfoot	Canada	1966	"Changes"	Lightfoot!	
The Limeliters	United States	1987	"The Power and the Glory"	We the People: A Musical Celebration of Our Constitution	
Living Voices	United States	1966	"There but for Fortune"	Positively 4th Street and Other Message Folk Songs	
Rod MacDonald	United States	1998	"Pleasures of the Harbor"	What's That I Hear?: The Songs of Phil Ochs	
Iain MacKintosh	United States	1988	"When I'm Gone"	Gentle Persuasion	
Magpie	United States	1982	"Bracero"	Working My Life Away	
Magpie	United States	1994	"How Long"	Seed on the Prairie	
Magpie	United States	1995	"How Long"	Spoken in Love	
Magpie	United States	1997	"I Ain't Marching Anymore"	The Long Walk To Freedom Reunion Concert	
Magpie	United States	1998	"Power and the Glory"	What's That I Hear?: The Songs of Phil Ochs	
Magpie	United States	1997	"A Toast to Those Who Are Gone"	The Long Walk To Freedom Reunion Concert	
Magpie	United States	1999	"There but for Fortune"	Give Light	
Magpie	United States	1986	"When I'm Gone"	If It Ain't Love	
Magpie	United States	1986	"When I'm Gone"	Live in Augusta	
Magpie	United States	1994	"You Should've Been Down in Mississippi"	Freedom Is a Constant Struggle: Songs of the Mississippi Civil Rights Movement	
Magpie, Kim and Reggie Harris	United States	1994	"How Long"	Freedom Is a Constant Struggle: Songs of the Mississippi Civil Rights Movement	
Magpie, Kim and Reggie Harris	United States	1995	"When I'm Gone"	Spoken in Love	
Magpie, Kim and Reggie Harris, Matthew Jones	United States	1997	"What's That I Hear"	The Long Walk To Freedom Reunion Concert	
Lee Mallory	United States	1966	"That's the Way It's Gonna Be"	Single	
David Massengill	United States	1998	"Crucifixion"	What's That I Hear?: The Songs of Phil Ochs	
Iain Matthews	England	1998	"Flower Lady"	What's That I Hear?: The Songs of Phil Ochs	
Megan McDonough and Christine Lavin	United States	1998	"Gas Station Women"	What's That I Hear?: The Songs of Phil Ochs	
Melanie	United States	1971	"Chords of Fame"	The Good Book	
Melanie	United States	1979	"Miranda"	Ballroom Streets	
Roger Miller	United States	1998	"Cops of the World"	Performer shows	
The Chad Mitchell Trio	United States	1964	"The Draft Dodger Rag"	The Slightly Irreverent Mitchell Trio	
The Mitchell Trio	United States	1965	"That's the Way It's Gonna Be"	That's the Way It's Gonna Be	
Modern Folk Quartet	United States	1964	"The Bells"	Changes	
Katy Moffatt	United States	1998	"Here's to the State of Mississippi"	What's That I Hear?: The Songs of Phil Ochs	
Katy Moffatt	United States	1996	"The Highwayman"	Midnight Radio	
Maria Monti	Italy	1972	"Non È Solo un Caso" ("There but for Fortune")	Maria Monti e i Contrautori	
Christy Moore	Ireland	2005	"Changes"	Burning Times	
Ryoko Moriyama	Japan	1967	"Konoha No Oka" ("Changes")	Single	
Morrissey	England	2019	"Days of Decision"	California Son	
MWF	United States	2003	"The Scorpion Departs But Never Returns"	Poison Ochs: A Tribute to Phil Ochs	
Holly Near	United States	1999	"No More Songs"	Sky Dances	
The New Christy Minstrels	United States	1966	"There but for Fortune"	Single	
The Nields	United States	2001	"I Ain't Marching Anymore"	Clearwater Live! The Festival That Saved a River	
Lillebjørn Nilsen	Norway	1979	"Forandring" ("Changes")	Oslo 3	
Nina & Frederik	Denmark, Netherlands	1964	"One More Parade"	Little Boxes and Other Favourites	
Nina & Frederik	Denmark, Netherlands	1966	"There but for Fortune"	An Evening with Nina & Frederik at the Royal Albert Hall	
Oyster Band	England	1990	"Gonna Do What I Have to Do" ("Do What I Have to Do")	Little Rock to Leipzig	
Gene Parsons	United States	1979	"My Kingdom for a Car"	Melodies	
Tom Paxton	United States	1998	"Draft Dodger Rag"	What's That I Hear?: The Songs of Phil Ochs	
Pearl Jam	United States	2006	"Here's to the State of Mississippi"	VH1 Storytellers	
Peter and Gordon	England, Scotland	c. 1967	"Che Cos'é una Rosa" ("Flower Lady")	Single	
Peter and Gordon	England, Scotland	1967	"The Flower Lady"	Knight in Rusty Armour	
Peter, Paul and Mary	United States	1995	"There but for Fortune"	Such Is Love	
The Gretchen Phillips Experience	United States	1995	"There but for Fortune"	Studio Sessions, Austin Music Network	
Shawn Phillips	United States	1965	"The Bells"	I'm a Loner	
Shawn Phillips	United States	1965	"I'm Tired"	I'm a Loner	
Pinhead Gunpowder	United States	1997	"Song of My Returning"	Goodbye Ellston Avenue	
Pozo-Seco Singers	United States	1967	"Changes"	I Can Make It With You	
Tony Rice	United States	1988	"Changes"	Native American	
Brian Ritchie	United States	1988	"Parade" ("One More Parade")	Sun Ra: Man from Outer Space	
The Roches	United States	1998	"The Bells"	What's That I Hear?: The Songs of Phil Ochs	
Garnet Rogers	Canada	1988	"Crucifixion"	Speaking Softly in the Dark	
David Rovics	United States	1998	"Draft Dodger Rag"	Pay Day at Coal Creek	
David Rovics	United States	1996	"In the Heat of the Summer"	Make It So	
Pete Seeger	United States	1964	"The Ballad of Lou Marsh"	Pete Seeger Sings Little Boxes & Other Broadsides (also known as Broadside Ballads, Vol. 2)	
Pete Seeger	United States	1966	"The Draft Dodger Rag"	Dangerous Songs!?	
Pete Seeger	United States	1965	"The Power and the Glory"	God Bless the Grass	
Pete Seeger and Tao Rodríguez-Seeger	United States	2001	"Draft Dodger Rag"	Clearwater Live! The Festival That Saved a River	
The Shrubs	England	1988	"Another Age"	Another Age	
Broderick Smith	Australia	1996	"Jim Dean of Indiana"	Crayon Angels	
Smothers Brothers and George Segal	United States	1967	"Draft Dodger Rag"	The Smothers Brothers Comedy Hour	
SONiA	United States	1998	"Is There Anybody Here?"	What's That I Hear?: The Songs of Phil Ochs	
The Spokesmen	United States	1965	"There but for Fortune"	The Dawn of Correction	
Squirrel Bait	United States	1987	"Tape from California"	Skag Heaven	
Crispian St. Peters	England	1966	"Changes"	Single	
Teenage Fanclub	Scotland	1993	"Chords of Fame"	Thirteen	
Tempest	United States	2001	"Iron Lady"	Balance	
They Might Be Giants	United States	1990	"One More Parade"	Rubáiyát: Elektra's 40th Anniversary	
Clem Tholet	Southern Rhodesia	1978	"Power and Glory"	Two Sides to Every Story	
Richard Thompson	England	2002	"I Ain't Marching Anymore"	Performer shows	
Travelers 3	United States	1965	"Freedom Calling" ("What's That I Hear")	New Sounds	
Dana Valery	Italy	1966	"There but for Fortune"	Top Pop Song Hits, Vol. 2	
Dave Van Ronk	United States	1994	"Outside of a Small Circle of Friends"	To All My Friends in Far-Flung Places	
Dave Van Ronk	United States	1998	"Outside of a Small Circle of Friends"	What's That I Hear?: The Songs of Phil Ochs	
Sammy Walker	United States	1975	"Bound for Glory" (Note: Produced by Ochs, who also sings.)	Broadside Ballads, Vol. 8: Song for Patty	
Sammy Walker	United States	1998	"Jim Dean of Indiana"	What's That I Hear?: The Songs of Phil Ochs	
Sammy Walker	United States	1994	"There but for Fortune"	Old Time Southern Dream	
The Weakerthans	Canada	1999	"Ringing of Revolution"	Return of the Read Menace	
Cassell Webb	United States	1999	"Jim Dean of Indiana"	Songs of a Stranger	
Pat Wictor	United States	2017	"Celia"	This Is Absolutely Real: Visions and Versions of Phil Ochs	
Pat Wictor	United States	2017	"City Boy"	This Is Absolutely Real: Visions and Versions of Phil Ochs	
Pat Wictor	United States	2017	"First Snow"	This Is Absolutely Real: Visions and Versions of Phil Ochs	
Pat Wictor	United States	2017	"I'm Tired"	This Is Absolutely Real: Visions and Versions of Phil Ochs	
Pat Wictor	United States	2017	"Knock on the Door"	This Is Absolutely Real: Visions and Versions of Phil Ochs	
Pat Wictor	United States	2017	"Lincoln Park"	This Is Absolutely Real: Visions and Versions of Phil Ochs	
Pat Wictor	United States	2017	"The Scorpion Departs"	This Is Absolutely Real: Visions and Versions of Phil Ochs	
Pat Wictor	United States	2017	"There but for Fortune"	This Is Absolutely Real: Visions and Versions of Phil Ochs	
Pat Wictor	United States	2017	"The Trial"	This Is Absolutely Real: Visions and Versions of Phil Ochs	
Cris Williamson	United States	1966	"Changes"	The World Around Cris Williamson	
Windborne	United States	2022	"The Ballad of Medgar Evers"	Of Hard Times and Harmony	
Windborne	United States	2022	"When I'm Gone"	Of Hard Times and Harmony	
Glenn Yarbrough	United States	1967	"Crucifixion"	For Emily, Whenever I May Find Her	
Glenn Yarbrough	United States	1968	"One More Parade"	We Survived the Madness	
Glenn Yarbrough	United States	1967	"Pleasures of the Harbor"	For Emily, Whenever I May Find Her	
Glenn Yarbrough	United States	1965	"That's the Way It's Gonna Be"	Come Share My Life	
Glenn Yarbrough	United States	1968	"That's the Way It's Gonna Be"	We Survived the Madness	
Glenn Yarbrough	United States	1994	"That's the Way It's Gonna Be"	Live! at the Troubadour	
Glenn Yarbrough and the Limeliters	United States	1974	"That's the Way It's Gonna Be"	Reunion	
Glenn Yarbrough and the Limeliters	United States	2001	"That's the Way It's Gonna Be"	The Chicago Tapes: First Set	
Peter Yarrow	United States	1998	"There but for Fortune"	What's That I Hear?: The Songs of Phil Ochs	
Neil Young	Canada	2013	"Changes"	Farm Aid 2013	
Neil Young	Canada	2014	"Changes"	Performer shows	
Neil Young	Canada	2014	"Changes"	A Letter Home	

== See also ==
- List of songs recorded by Phil Ochs
