= What's That I Hear?: The Songs of Phil Ochs =

Compilation album by Various artists
- Released: March 10, 1998
- Genre: Country, folk, singer-songwriter
- Length: 127:23
- Label: Sliced Bread
- Producer: Gene Shay

Professional ratings
Review scores
Source	Rating
Allmusic	4.5/5 stars
Dirty Linen	Favorable
Sing Out!	Favorable

What's That I Hear?: The Songs of Phil Ochs is a 1998 tribute compilation to the music of the late Phil Ochs. The various performers cover several generations of Ochs' admirers. All profits from the album's sales were divided equally between the non-profits, the ACLU Foundation of Southern California and Sing Out! Magazine.

== Overview ==
Producer Gene Shay says that he never intended the project to be a tribute album: "It was coming up on the twentieth anniversary of Phil 's death. I always had loved his music and his politics and respected what he did. Then I happened to hear this group disappear fear—Sonia Rutstein and her sister Cindy—do the song 'Is There Anybody Here?' That just clicked the light on, you know, that here's a young group in their twenties, doing Phil Ochs material and doing it in a really dynamic way. I was really inspired. That demonstrated to me that the songs were still valid, still vigorous, and could be done in contemporary way." A core group of the artists from the compilation were frequent participants in the "Phil Ochs Song Nights" that Phil's sister Sonny Ochs had been holding for the past 15 years. Five of these artist participated in a tour to support the album. They were Pat Humphries, Nancy Tucker, Kim and Reggie Harris, Magpie, and Greg Greenway.

Three of the songs included were not recorded by Ochs in his lifetime: "Hands", "Freedom Riders", and "Sailors and Soldiers". Some of the songs are performed in a style similar to Ochs's, but others are given new arrangements. For example, Rex Fowler of Aztec Two Step performs "There but for Fortune" with a reggae rhythm and updates the lyrics with references to the incident at Tiananmen Square.

The album was the second-most-played album by folk radio DJs in 1998. It ranked behind another major folk music tribute double album released the same week, Where Have All the Flowers Gone: The Songs of Pete Seeger (Appleseed/Red House).

Writing for Allmusic, Bruce Eder said of the compilation: "The quality of the performances is uniformly first-rate, and it's astonishing to discover the full range of admirers that Ochs' songs attract, as well as the sheer selection of songs, some of which Ochs never got to record officially — few key bases are left untouched in the two-hour-plus collection, although it would have been nice if someone had covered released obscurities such as 'Basket in the Pool.' The notes are very thorough, personal, and affecting."

== Track listing ==
Words and music by Phil Ochs except where noted [performers are also indicated].
Disc one:

1. "Power and the Glory" – 3:06 [Magpie]
2. "Boy in Ohio" – 5:01 [David Buskin]
3. "Jim Dean of Indiana" – 5:40 [Sammy Walker]
4. "Chords of Fame" – 3:49 [Lauren Agnelli, Dave Rave & the Charmers]]
5. "There but for Fortune" – 4:12 [Peter Yarrow]
6. "Flower Lady" – 4:58 [Iain Matthews]
7. "I Ain't Marching Anymore" – 2:42 [Arlo Guthrie]
8. "Is There Anybody Here?" – 4:04 [SONiA]
9. "Draft Dodger Rag" – 2:53 [Tom Paxton]
10. "Changes" – 4:53 [Nancy Tucker]
11. "The Bells" (Poem by Edgar Allan Poe adapted & set to music by Phil Ochs) – 2:45 [The Roches]
12. "Pleasures of the Harbor" – 5:27 [Rod MacDonald]
13. "Tape from California" – 6:36 [Greg Greenway]
14. "Another Age" – 3:58 [John Wesley Harding]
15. "When I'm Gone" – 5:45 [Eric Andersen]

Disc two:

1. "What's That I Hear?" – 3:12 [Kim and Reggie Harris]
2. "Hands" – 5:43 [Pat Humphries]
3. "Bracero" – 4:20 [John Gorka]
4. "Sailors and Soldiers" – 3:58 [Sid Griffin & Billy Bragg]
5. "The Highwayman" (Poem by Alfred Noyes adapted & set to music by Phil Ochs) – 6:01 [Steve Gillette & Cindy Mangsen]
6. "Gas Station Women" – 3:08 [Megan McDonough & Christine Lavin]
7. "Outside of a Small Circle of Friends" – 3:31 [Dave Van Ronk]
8. "Crucifixion" – 8:18 [David Massengill]
9. "Here's to the State of Mississippi" – 7:11 [Katy Moffatt]
10. "Freedom Riders" – 3:27 [Kim and Reggie Harris, Magpie]
11. "Iron Lady" – 5:00 [Anne Hills]
12. "There But for Fortune" – 4:08 [Rex Fowler]
13. "No More Songs" – 3:37 [Karen Savoca]

== Credits ==
- Compilation produced by Gene Shay
- Executive producer – Carl Apter
- Music director – Larry Cohen
- Spiritual guide – Sonny Ochs
- Project coordinator – Debby Appelbaum, assisted by Phillip Seitz
- Mastering – Masterwork Recording Inc., Philadelphia, PA
- Engineer – Pete Humphries
- Art Direction & Design – Todd Palmer, Virtual Farm Creative
- Photography – Robert Corwin/Photo-Arts
- Additional Photos – Carl Apter, Jerry Corwin, Sherry Rayn Barnett, Dave Gahr
- Liner and song notes – Michael Schumacher
- Sidebar – David Cohen

== Charts ==
date	chart	peak
March 1998	Folk Radio Airplay Top Albums	3

== Releases ==
year	format	label	catalog #
1998	CD	Sliced Bread	71176
