= American Troubadour =

Compilation album by Phil Ochs
- Released: 1997
- Recorded: 1967–1974
- Genre: Folk
- Length: 141:37
- Label: A&M
- Producers: Larry Marks, Van Dyke Parks, Arthur Gorson and Phil Ochs

Phil Ochs chronology
Farewells & Fantasies (1997)	American Troubadour (1997)	The Early Years (2000)

Professional ratings
Review scores
Source	Rating
Allmusic	4/5 stars
NME	6/10
Uncut	3/5 stars

American Troubadour is a 1997 British 2-CD set that presented a portrait of singer-songwriter Phil Ochs' later career, featuring selections from each of the five albums he recorded for A&M Records, from various non-album single sides and from a performance Ochs gave on March 13, 1969, in Vancouver, British Columbia. It is notable for the inclusion of Ochs' post-1970 single sides, otherwise unavailable on compact disc and for the inclusion of a cover of Chuck Berry's "School Days", a previously unavailable outtake from Ochs' infamous March 27, 1970, concert at Carnegie Hall.

== Track listing ==
=== Disc One ===
- All songs by Phil Ochs.
1. Cross My Heart
2. Flower Lady
3. Outside of a Small Circle of Friends
4. Pleasures of the Harbor (live)
5. Crucifixion
6. Tape From California
7. White Boots Marching in a Yellow Land
8. Half A Century High
9. Joe Hill
10. The War Is Over
11. William Butler Yeats Visits Lincoln Park And Escapes Unscathed
12. Here's to the State of Richard Nixon (live)
13. The Scorpion Departs But Never Returns
14. Doesn't Lenny Live Here Anymore
15. Rehearsals for Retirement

=== Disc Two ===
- All songs by Phil Ochs, except where noted.
1. I Kill Therefore I Am
2. The Bells (Edgar Allan Poe and Phil Ochs)
3. The Highwayman (Alfred Noyes and Phil Ochs)
4. Another Age
5. There But For Fortune
6. One Way Ticket Home
7. Jim Dean of Indiana
8. My Kingdom For A Car
9. Gas Station Women
10. Chords of Fame
11. No More Songs
12. Mona Lisa (live) (Jay Livingston and Ray Evans)
13. I Ain't Marching Anymore (live)
14. School Days (live) (Chuck Berry)
15. The Power and the Glory
16. Kansas City Bomber
17. Bwatue (Phil Ochs and Dijiba-Bukasa)
18. Niko Mchumba Ngombe (Phil Ochs and Dijiba-Bukasa)
19. Changes (live)

=== Sources ===
==== Disc One ====
- Tracks 1–3 and 5 from Pleasures of the Harbor (1967)
- Track 4 from Gunfight at Carnegie Hall (recorded 1970, released 1975)
- Tracks 6–10 from Tape from California (1968)
- Tracks 11 and 13–15 from Rehearsals for Retirement (1969)
- Track 12 from the 1974 single.

==== Disc Two ====
- Track 1 from Rehearsals for Retirement (1969)
- Tracks 2–5 and 19 from There and Now: Live in Vancouver 1968 (sic) (recorded March 13, 1969, released 1991)
- Tracks 6–11 from Greatest Hits (1970)
- Tracks 12–13 from Gunfight at Carnegie Hall (recorded 1970, released 1975)
- Track 14 previously unreleased.
- Track 15 from the 1974 single.
- Track 16 from the 1973 single.
- Tracks 17–18 from the 1973 single.
