= 20th Century Masters – The Millennium Collection: The Best of Phil Ochs =

Greatest hits album by Phil Ochs
- Released: January 29, 2002
- Genre: Folk music
- Label: A&M

Phil Ochs chronology
The Early Years (2000)	20th Century Masters – The Millennium Collection: The Best of Phil Ochs (2002)	Cross My Heart: An Introduction to Phil Ochs (2004)

20th Century Masters – The Millennium Collection: The Best of Phil Ochs is a brief compilation of Phil Ochs later works on A&M Records. Focusing heavily on his debut for the label, Pleasures Of The Harbor, offering five of its eight tracks, it only offered two tracks from his other three studio albums and only one from his 1974 live album. These selections tend to de-emphasize the folk leanings of those later albums while embracing the more experimental leanings.

Professional ratings
Review scores
Source	Rating
Allmusic	4/5 stars

== Track listing ==
All tracks are written by Phil Ochs.

No.	Title	Original Album	Length
1.	"Cross My Heart"	Pleasures of the Harbor (1967)	3:19
2.	"Flower Lady"	Pleasures Of The Harbor (1967)	6:05
3.	"Outside of a Small Circle of Friends"	Pleasures Of The Harbor (1967)	3:43
4.	"Pleasures of the Harbor"	Pleasures Of The Harbor (1967)	8:08
5.	"Crucifixion"	Pleasures Of The Harbor (1967)	8:44
6.	"Tape From California"	Tape from California (1968)	6:47
7.	"The War Is Over"	Tape From California (1968)	4:23
8.	"Rehearsals For Retirement"	Rehearsals for Retirement (1969)	4:14
9.	"William Butler Yeats Visits Lincoln Park and Escapes Unscathed"	Rehearsals For Retirement (1969)	2:57
10.	"No More Songs"	Greatest Hits (1970)	4:18
11.	"Chords of Fame"	Greatest Hits (1970)	3:32
12.	"I Ain't Marching Anymore"	Gunfight at Carnegie Hall (1974)	3:47
