= Cross My Heart: An Introduction to Phil Ochs =

Greatest hits album by Phil Ochs
- Released: 2004
- Genre: Folk
- Label: A&M

Phil Ochs chronology
20th Century Masters: The Millennium Collection: The Best of Phil Ochs (2002)	Cross My Heart: An Introduction to Phil Ochs (2004)	Amchitka, The 1970 Concert That Launched Greenpeace (2009)

Professional ratings
Review scores
Source	Rating
Allmusic	3/5 stars

Cross My Heart: An Introduction to Phil Ochs is a British best-of compilation of the U.S. folk singer's A&M recordings. The CD features three tracks each from Pleasures of the Harbor, Tape from California, and Rehearsals for Retirement as well as two from Greatest Hits and one from Gunfight at Carnegie Hall, with the thirteenth track the B-side to his 1973 Africa-only single, "Niko Mchumba Ngobe". Overall, this is a more diverse collection than 2002's 20th Century Masters: The Millennium Collection: The Best of Phil Ochs, which tips the balance more heavily toward Pleasures of the Harbor.

== Track listing ==
All songs by Phil Ochs unless otherwise noted.

1. "Chords of Fame" – 3:32
2. "Cross My Heart" – 3:18
3. "Rehearsals for Retirement" – 4:12
4. "Crucifixion" – 8:44
5. "White Boots Marching in a Yellow Land" – 3:31
6. "The Scorpion Departs But Never Returns" – 4:16
7. "The War Is Over" – 4:23
8. "Niko Mchumba Ngobe" (P. Ochs and Dijiba-Bukasa) – 3:03
9. "Joe Hill" – 7:20
10. "Jim Dean of Indiana" – 5:02
11. "Pretty Smart on My Part" – 3:18
12. "Pleasures of the Harbor" – 8:07
13. "I Ain't Marchin' Anymore" – 3:49

== Personnel ==
- Robert Altman – Cover Photo
- Joe Black – Project Coordinator
- Sid Griffin – Sleeve Notes
- Larry Marks – Producer
- Keiron McGarry – Remastering
- Phil Ochs – Producer
- Van Dyke Parks – Producer

== Source listing ==
- Tracks 1 and 10 from Greatest Hits (1970)
- Tracks 2, 4 and 12 from Pleasures Of The Harbor (1967)
- Tracks 3, 6 and 11 from Rehearsals For Retirement (1969)
- Tracks 5, 7 and 9 from Tape From California (1968)
- Track 8 from the 1973 single
- Track 13 from Gunfight At Carnegie Hall (1974)
