= Sonny Ochs =

Music producer and radio host

- Born: Sonia Ochs; April 12, 1937 (age 89); Scotland
- Occupations: Music producer and radio host
- Children: 3: Robyn Ochs
- Relatives: Phil Ochs (brother); Michael Ochs (brother)
- Website: https://www.sonnyochs.com/

Sonia "Sonny" Ochs is a music producer and radio host. She is known for the "Phil Ochs Song Nights" she organizes, at which various musicians sing the songs of her brother, singer-songwriter Phil Ochs.

Ochs was born in Scotland on April 12, 1937, to an American father and Scottish mother. The following year, her family moved to the United States. Her brother Phil was born in 1940, followed by Michael in 1943. The Ochs family moved frequently: first to San Antonio, Texas, then to Austin, Texas; to Far Rockaway, New York, and then to Perrysburg in upstate New York.

After she graduated from high school, Ochs was sent by her parents to a finishing school in Switzerland. While she was away, the family moved to Columbus, Ohio. Ochs married a soldier in early 1957, but the couple were divorced by 1963. The couple had one child: Robyn Ochs. She later remarried and had two sons.

In January 1976, Phil Ochs—who was suffering from alcoholism and bipolar disorder—moved to his sister's Far Rockaway, New York, home. She hoped she could nurture him back to health. He saw a psychiatrist who prescribed medication; he told his sister he was taking it. On April 9, 1976, Phil Ochs hanged himself in the bathroom of Sonny's house.

Ochs was a school teacher in Far Rockaway and upstate New York. Since the 1980s, she has hosted her own radio program, previously on WFMU and WRPI and currently on WIOX, and volunteered at numerous folk festivals. Since 1983, she has organized a series of "Phil Ochs Song Nights", concerts at which various musicians perform her brother's songs. Some of the performers have included Greg Greenway, Kim and Reggie Harris, Pat Humphries, Magpie, Fred Small, and Sammy Walker.

Interviews with Ochs and her brother Michael were featured in the 2010 documentary film Phil Ochs: There but for Fortune. The film, which focuses on both Phil's life and the turbulent times in which he lived, also features interviews with his friends and associates, as well as extensive archival news footage from the 1960s.

Throughout 2015, the year that Phil Ochs would have been 75, he and his music were celebrated with concerts, festivals and special events. Sonny Ochs produced 11 Phil Ochs Song Nights, and appeared as a special guest at the Ottawa, Canada venue, The Gladstone Theatre, for A Tribute to Phil Ochs, as part of Ochsfest, held on December 19, 2015, which would have been Phil's 75th birthday.

On September 16, 2016, Sonny Ochs presented the first award named for Phil Ochs, sponsored by the non-profit A Still Small Voice 4U, Inc., to the peace and social justice activists, songwriters and performers, Emma's Revolution. On October 8, 2017, Sonny presented the second Phil Ochs Award to activist, songwriter and performer Charlie King. The Phil Ochs Award is given annually to a songwriter and compelling performer who "advances the spirit of Phil's music and activism."
