= Northern Spirit Radio =

- First air date: July 31st, 2005
- Availability: Broadcasts in the United States, Internet Access Worldwide
- Headquarters: Eau Claire, Wisconsin, USA
- Owner: Northern Spirit Radio Inc.
- Key people: Mark Helpsmeet (Founder)
- Official website: northernspiritradio.org

Northern Spirit Radio (NSR) is an organization founded in Eau Claire, Wisconsin by Mark Helpsmeet that creates radio programs. According to NSR's website, "NSR promotes world healing by broadcasting inspirational and educational voices of peace and social justice, using the language of personal story, music, and spirituality."

== History ==
=== Creating the show ===
The Federal Communications Commission (FCC) opened a filing window for obtaining low power FM (LPFM) radio licenses in January 2000. An environmental and activist organization by the name of Northern Thunder in Eau Claire, Wisconsin applied for an LPFM for the local station called WHYS Radio. The FCC granted the license, and, once the headquarters for the station were completed, they began broadcasting in spring 2005.

During discussion about potential programs to be included in the station's schedule, the possibility of a Sunday program related to spirituality and social action was raised, and local Quaker activist Mark Helpsmeet's name was suggested as a potential host.

Shortly thereafter, Helpsmeet had asked for and began meeting with a clearness committee to help discern his future work. A proposal to create programming for WHYS Radio was submitted, and with the clearness committee's support, and with support from the general community, the WHYS Radio programming committee eventually agreed to the offer of two one-hour-long weekly programs by Helpsmeet. On July 26, 2005, Eau Claire Friends Meeting (ECFM), a local monthly meeting that Helpsmeet had been part of, united in creating a support committee for NSR and in taking the work under the care of ECFM.

=== Early stages ===
Helpsmeet first created NSR's first program, "Spirit in Action", which aired on July 31, 2005. His next program, "Song of the Soul", followed and aired on August 14 of the same year. The shows respectively feature a variety of people who dedicate themselves to lives "of fruitful service, of peace, community, compassion, creative action and progressive efforts" and songs that describe people's spiritual journeys through life that have truly spoken to them in their depths. For the first year of NSR programming, a support committee was provided by ECFM. ECFM then requested a support committee (which is also known as an "anchoring committee") from the regional association of Quakers with which ECFM is affiliated, Northern Yearly Meeting. Northern Yearly Meeting's Ministry and Nurture Committee appointed a support committee, which Helpsmeet met with regularly until the anchoring function shifted back to ECFM in 2013.

After two years of making programs, Helpsmeet made NSR programs available for syndication. WDRT and WIDE-LP were among the first stations to start carrying the shows, with KLOI-LP Lopez Island Community Radio and WKNH of Keene State College following close behind. Several more stations began carrying NSR programs when the shows started being shared on The Pacifica AudioPort in 2008.

=== Incorporation and nonprofit status ===
In 2012, the anchoring committee and Helpsmeet met and decided that it was time for NSR to move forward and become incorporated. A board of directors was established and Northern Spirit Radio was incorporated in Wisconsin on May 17, 2013.

Following its incorporation, the NSR board of directors prepared and submitted an application for 501(c)(3) status, which the IRS approved in July 2014.

== Broadcasting locations ==
As of February 2015, NSR airs on approximately 20 stations across the United States, including three in California and Wisconsin, two in Iowa, Vermont, and Washington, and others in Colorado, Missouri, New York, and Virginia.

== International connections ==
While NSR is based in Wisconsin, the station follows stories of social justice and peace from across the world. Helpsmeet has interviewed people from Australia, the Democratic Republic of Congo, Cuba, England, Estonia, Israel, and Rwanda. Since the broadcasts are made available online via NSR's official website and podcasts, its following is worldwide.

== Activism ==
NSR has featured many guests on "Spirit in Action" that focus on current social issues faced by people across the United States and around the rest of the world. Education, racial and gender equality, equal marriage, environmentalism, and the conflicts in the Middle East only encompass a few topics that the show covers. Some examples of interviews that include these themes are "Fruitful Lesbian Lives", "War Taxes, Injustice in Palestine, Racism - A Life of Faith, Joy, & Service", and "Protecting Oklahoma from the Keystone XL Pipeline".

== Musicians ==
The Song of the Soul program typically features interviews with a wide range of musicians, some nationally known, some known primarily within limited circles. Nationally known performers have included Cris Williamson, Peggy Seeger, Red Grammer, Gordon Bok, Kim and Reggie Harris, Peter Alsop, Bob Franke, Fred Small, David Rovics, Charlie King, Susan Werner, Magpie, Sonny Ochs, Carrie Newcomer, Tom Paxton, John McCutcheon among many others.

== Spirituality ==
NSR programs highlight, in addition to the activism or musical aspects of the guests, exploration of their religious or spiritual beliefs, motivations, or practices. Occasionally this has included guests who are especially known for their theological studies and writings, like John Shelby Spong, Marcus Borg, Jack Nelson-Pallmeyer, Gary Dorrien, Philip Gulley, Ken Stone, and others.
