= Frances Taylor =

New York music and film critic and a lyricist

- Born: Pearl Frances Finkelstein; July 10, 1909; New York City, New York
- Died: December 8, 1979 (aged 70); Poughkeepsie, New York
- Occupations: Music and film critic

Frances Fink Taylor (born Pearl Frances Finkelstein, July 10, 1909 – December 8, 1979) was a New York music and film critic and a lyricist whose best-known song, "Those Three Are on My Mind" (with music by Pete Seeger) was a lament for the murdered civil rights workers - James Chaney, Andrew Goodman, and Michael Schwerner.

== Early life ==
Taylor was born Pearl Frances Finkelstein in New York City on July 10, 1909. Her parents were Louis and Ida (Rich) Finkelstein. Her father, born in Romania, operated a drugstore. Her mother, born in Russia, was the daughter of a rabbi. The family name was later shortened to Fink. Taylor studied at the New Jersey College for Women at Rutgers University and graduated from the Columbia University School of Journalism with a bachelor's degree in literature in 1930.

== Career ==
After graduating from Columbia, Taylor worked as a writer and reporter for the tabloid New York Evening Graphic. A Columbia classmate, reminiscing more than 50 years later, said that "Frankie Fink ... wrote lurid stories about the sex intrigues of the famous and the infamous of those roisterous times." She may have written other kinds of stories for the Graphic as well; one article, in January 1932, for the paper's magazine was about defense attorney Samuel Liebowitz who a year later became defense attorney for the Scottsboro Boys.

Taylor was a contributor to The Literary Digest in the 1930s. From 1934 to 1936 she was a reporter at The Washington Post, mostly covering motion pictures.

In the early to mid-1960s Taylor wrote a music column for the Long Island Press. She interviewed Bob Dylan in the Manhattan office of his manager, Albert Grossman, in August 1965. Her column based on that interview was published in the Press on October 17, 1965, and has been frequently quoted, largely due to Dylan's disavowal in the interview of his early folk and protest songs.

In 1965, inspired by her interviews with young singer-songwriters, Taylor began writing lyrics herself. Three of her songs were published in Broadside: The National Topical Song Magazine in 1966. The first of these, "Computer Love-Song" (with music by Irma Jurist) was a whimsical parody of computer matching services.

In October 1966 Broadside published "Those Three Are on My Mind" with words by Taylor and music by Pete Seeger. The song begins "I think of Andy in the cold wet clay. Those three are on my mind. With his friends down beside him on that brutal day. Those three are on my mind." The refrain says "But I breathe yet and for some the sky is bright. I cannot give up hoping for a morning light. And so I ask the killers: 'Do you sleep at night?' Those three are on my mind." Broadside reported that Taylor first wrote the lyrics as a poem in 1965 and Seeger later set it to music. Seeger told Sing Out! magazine in 1995 that "Frances Taylor sent these words to me; all I did was put a tune to them."

Pete Seeger performed the song on The David Susskind Show on October 2, 1966. He recorded it on his 1967 album Waist Deep in the Big Muddy and Other Love Songs. That same year Harry Belafonte recorded the song on his album Belafonte on Campus. Belafonte continued to sing the song over the years. He sang it at the memorial service for Carolyn Goodman, Andrew Goodman's mother, in 2007 and at the Many Rivers to Cross festival in Atlanta in October 2016. The song was also recorded by Kim and Reggie Harris and Magpie and was included on the albums Spoken in Love (1995) and on Where Have All the Flowers Gone? The Songs of Pete Seeger (1998).

The November 1966 issue of Broadside included another song with words by Taylor and music by Seeger. Titled "Men of Principle," it mocked government officials who talked about open and low-cost housing, integrated schools, jobs, and peace but did nothing about them.

By 1968, Taylor was writing film reviews, which she continued to do until the demise of the Long Island Press in 1977. She was a member of the New York Film Critics Circle. Her reviews were widely syndicated by the Newhouse News Service.

== Personal life and death ==
In 1933 Taylor married Michael Zala, a Czech-born motion picture theater operator. They were later divorced. In 1947, she married Joseph S. Taylor, another motion picture operator. Taylor died in Poughkeepsie, New York, on December 8, 1979, at the age of 70.
