= Jim Glover =

American peace activist and folk singer (1942–2025)

- Born: 1942
- Died: 2025

Jim R. Glover (1942 – 2025) was an American peace activist and folk singer. He was from Cleveland, Ohio and lived in Brandon, Florida.

== Relationship with Phil Ochs ==
Glover attended Ohio State University, where he met Phil Ochs in the fall of 1960. He introduced Ochs to folk music and leftist politics, and taught him how to play guitar. Glover introduced Ochs to the music of Pete Seeger, Woody Guthrie, and The Weavers. Both Ochs and Glover were campers at the cooperative summer camp in Delton, Michigan, Circle Pines Center, where the cook had been Big Bill Broonzy and a frequent visitor was Pete Seeger. Jim's father, Hugh Glover, was a socialist, and he was very influential to both Jim and Phil. As a result, the two became gradually more interested in politics and folk music. Glover and Ochs were in a short-lived folk duo called the "Singing Socialists", later renamed the "Sundowners". Though the group didn't last long, they remained friends.

Glover was at Phil Ochs's infamous Gunfight at Carnegie Hall performance in March 1970, and even performed the last song of the evening, "No More Songs", with Ochs that night (though that song was not included for release on the official live album). Glover sings backing vocals on the version of "No More Songs" that was previously released on Ochs' Greatest Hits album in 1970. He also appeared on The Midnight Special TV series with Phil Ochs in 1974, and they performed the songs "Power and the Glory" and "Changes" together.

== Jim and Jean ==
In 1961, Glover left Ohio and moved to New York City, where he met Jean Ray at the Café Raffio and later fell in love with her. Together, they formed the 1960s folk music duo Jim and Jean.

Jim and Jean developed a good following at Café Raffio's in Greenwich Village, and soon began making enough money to pay the rent on their Thompson Street apartment. In 1962, Phil Ochs moved in with Jim and Jean when he was first starting his musical career in Greenwich Village. Jean introduced Ochs to her friend Alice Skinner, and the couple soon moved in together and eventually married. As Ochs got better at songwriting, Jim and Jean began to perform, and later recorded, a number of his songs.

Jim and Jean's first appearance on record, Jack Linkletter Presents a Folk Festival, was a live 1963 compilation album released on GNP Crescendo that featured a number of folk acts. Jim and Jean went on to record three albums: Jim and Jean (Philips 1965), Changes (Verve Folkways 1966), and People World (Verve Forecast 1968). Jim and Jean recorded seven Phil Ochs songs across these three albums - "The Bells" and "There But For Fortune" on the 1965 album, "Crucifixion", "Changes" and "Flower Lady" on the 1966 album, and "Ringing of Revolution" and "Cross My Heart" on the 1968 album. Eventually, Jim and Jean split up and went their separate ways. They did perform together at the Phil Ochs Memorial Concert in 1976, singing "Crucifixion".

Glover recorded some small-budget albums on his own (No Need to Explain in 1980 and Outsider in 2003), and Jean Ray went on to perform in some small-budget plays. Jim and Jean reunited to play one last show together at the People's Voice Cafe in New York City on March 18, 2006.

== Activism ==
Glover participated in a number of peace demonstrations over the years, including the March on the Pentagon on October 21, 1967, to protest the war in Vietnam. Jim demonstrated at the 1968 Democratic National Convention in Chicago and entertained other demonstrators, with Jean Glover and Phil Ochs, at the Quiet Knight Coffee House during breaks in the protests. He wrote a peace-related poem the day after 9/11 and recited it at a peace rally in September 2001, and wrote a peace-inspired letter to the editor that appeared in the St. Petersburg Times on September 28, 2001. On April 9, 2009, he performed a tribute to Phil Ochs at Mother's Musical Bakery in Sarasota, Florida.
