= Poison Ochs: A Tribute to Phil Ochs =

Compilation album by Various artists
- Released: 2003
- Genre: Indie rock, Experimental rock
- Length: 67:36
- Label: Wood Records

Professional ratings
Review scores
Source	Rating
indieville.com	85%

Poison Ochs: A Tribute to Phil Ochs is a tribute compilation to the music of the late Phil Ochs. Ochs' songs, which are generally thought of as folk music and folk rock, are performed by musicians associated with indie rock and experimental rock.

Poison Ochs was released in 2003 by Wood Records. All profits from the album's sales were distributed to Amnesty International.

== Track listing ==
Words and music by Phil Ochs [performers are also indicated].

1. "I Kill Therefore I Am" - 3:53 [Camper van Chadbourne]
2. "Half a Century High" - 3:30 [LAM]
3. "Spaceman" - 3:54 [Johnny J]
4. "Cross My Heart" - 2:26 [NitwiT]
5. "Flower Lady" - 5:13 [Linda Draper]
6. "I Ain't Marching Anymore" - 5:14 [Franck Sinistra]
7. "The Scorpion Departs But Never Returns" - 7:07 [MWF]
8. "Floods of Florence" - 4:57 [Lolwolf]
9. "Another Age" - 3:56 [Charles Fyant]
10. "Pleasures of the Harbor" - 8:29 [Ernesto Diaz-Infante]
11. "Changes" - 4:33 [Mary Jane]
12. "My Life" - 2:54 [Jr. Grease Chiefs]
13. "I've Had Her" - 8:31 [Jon Thompson Orchestra]
14. "Chords of Fame" - 2:59 [Daniel Johnston and Jad Fair]
