= Jean Halley =

American writer and sociologist

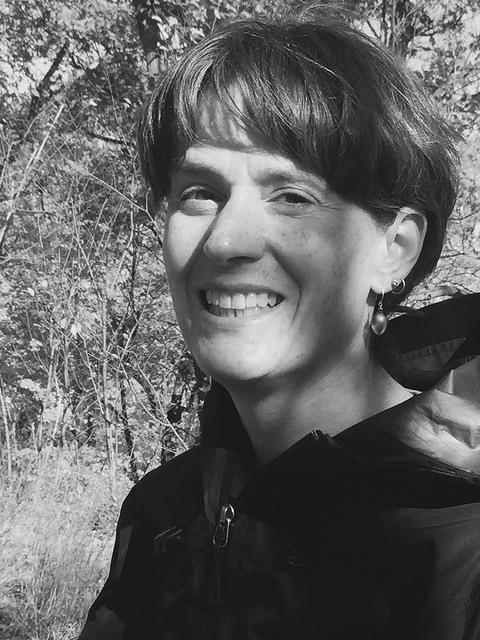
- Born: Jean Halley; June 16, 1967 (age 59); Washington D.C.
- Education: Colorado College; Harvard University
- Occupations: Sociologist, writer
- Partner: Jacob Segal
- Children: Isaiah Halley-Segal; Kathleen Halley-Segal
- Writing career
- Language: English
- Notable works: The Affective Turn: Theorizing the Social; Seeing White: An Introduction to White Privilege and Race
- Website: www.jeanhalley.net

Jean Halley (born June 16, 1967) is an American writer and sociologist based in New York City. Her work revolves around issues of social power, violence, trauma, gender, and animal studies. Halley is also a professor of sociology at the College of Staten Island and the Graduate Center of the City University of New York.

== Early life and education ==
Halley was born in 1967, in Washington DC and grew up in Wyoming and Montana. She attended Colorado College and received her bachelor's degree in psychology, with minors in Spanish and women's studies, in 1989. She earned her master's degree in theology at Harvard University in 1992 and her doctorate in sociology at the Graduate Center, CUNY in 2003.

== Career ==
Halley frequently uses elements of memoir in relating the topics of her books to her own biography. Her book about touching children, breastfeeding, children's sleep and contemporary childrearing advice, Boundaries of Touch: Parenting and Adult-Child Intimacy was published in July 2007 by the University of Illinois Press. With Patricia Ticineto Clough, Halley coedited The Affective Turn: Theorizing the Social in 2007. In "The Wire" her autoethnographic piece in that volume, Halley challenges traditional modes of storytelling that develop in linear fashion and that use binary oppositions as a way of describing or knowing the world.

In 2011, she co-authored Seeing White: An Introduction to White Privilege and Race with Amy Eshleman and Ramya Vijaya. A second edition came out in 2022. Her fourth book The Parallel Lives of Women and Cows: Meat Markets was published in 2012 by Palgrave Macmillan. In this book, Halley weaves together a social history of the American beef cattle industry, with her memoir of growing up in Wyoming in the shadow of her grandfather's cattle business.

Halley co-authored her fifth book, Seeing Straight: An Introduction to Sexual and Gender Privilege, with Amy Eshleman. The book was published in 2017 by Rowman & Littlefield. Halley has published numerous scholarly articles and in popular literary magazines including Harper's Magazine and The Antioch Review. She has given interviews on multiple radio stations including NPR and Northern Spirit Radio.

As a child and young adult, Halley spent much of her time horseback riding in the Rocky Mountains. Her book, Horse Crazy: Girls and the Lives of Horses was published in 2019 with the University of Georgia Press explores the passion many girls have for horses. Most recently, in 2022, she coauthored The Roads to Hillbrow: Making Life in South Africa's Community of Migrants with Ron Nerio. Halley has won a number of awards for teaching and civic engagement.
