= Kansas City Bomber (song) =

- Promotional copy of "Kansas City Bomber"

Single by Phil Ochs
- B-side: "Gas Station Women"
- Released: 1973
- Genre: Rock
- Length: 2:26
- Label: A&M
- Songwriter(s): Phil Ochs
- Producer(s): Phil Ochs, Michael Ochs, Lee Housekeeper

Phil Ochs singles chronology
"One Way Ticket Home" (1972)	"Kansas City Bomber" (1973)	"Bwatue" (1973)

"Kansas City Bomber" is a song by Phil Ochs, an American singer-songwriter best known for the protest songs he wrote in the 1960s.

In 1972, record producer Lee Housekeeper asked Ochs to write the theme song for the film Kansas City Bomber, a film about roller derby starring Raquel Welch. Although Ochs enjoyed watching the sport on television, composing the song proved difficult, as Ochs was suffering from writer's block. At last, he made a demo, on which Micky Dolenz of The Monkees sang back-up vocals.

Months later, Ochs was traveling in Australia. Housekeeper told him the film's producers liked his demo, but it was not exactly what they were looking for. Ochs decided to make a new recording of the song, backed by the Australian rock band Daddy Cool.

Ultimately, the film's producers chose not to use the Ochs song in the soundtrack. Nevertheless, he convinced his record company, A&M Records, to release it as a single. The record sold poorly.

In the only known review of "Kansas City Bomber", Record World wrote that "progressives will find this a moody change of pace." Billboard included the single in its "Also Recommended" column.

In 2001, writer Mark Brend described "Kansas City Bomber" as "unremarkable". Biographer Michael Schumacher wrote in 1996 that the song "was neither an admirable work nor an embarrassment".

Many Ochs fans never heard "Kansas City Bomber" before it was included in 1988's The War Is Over: The Best of Phil Ochs. The song was also included in the 1997 collection American Troubadour.
