= Bwatue =

- Cover of the 1990s bootleg reissue

Single by Phil Ochs
- B-side: "Niko Mchumba Ngombe"
- Released: 1973
- Genre: World music
- Length: 2:46
- Label: A&M
- Songwriter(s): Phil Ochs, Dijiba, Bukasa

Phil Ochs singles chronology
"Kansas City Bomber" (1973)	"Bwatue" (1973)	"Power and the Glory" (1974)

"Bwatue" is a song by Phil Ochs, an American singer-songwriter best known for the protest songs he wrote in the 1960s. He co-wrote the song with two African musicians named Dijiba and Bukasa. "Bwatue" was written and recorded in 1973.

"Bwatue" was written while Ochs was visiting Kenya. Its lyrics are in Lingala. The title means "canoe"; the lyrics develop the river as a metaphor for life. "Bwatue" was released as a single in Africa by A&M Records. The B-side of the single, "Niko Mchumba Ngombe", also by Ochs, Dijiba, and Bukasa, was written in Swahili. Both songs were recorded by Ochs with the Pan-African Ngembo Rumba Band. The record was a commercial failure.

"Bwatue" and "Niko Mchumba Ngombe" have been described as early examples of blending Western popular music with world music, and critics note that they predate Paul Simon's Graceland by more than ten years. Still, one critic says the record "should be seen more as a curiosity rather than a serious attempt at exploring a new style". One of Ochs' biographers cynically suggests that Ochs recorded the songs in order to deduct the cost of his trip to Africa from his income tax as a business expense.

In the early 1990s, the single was reissued in a limited edition of 1000 by Sparkle Records, ostensibly on behalf of the Phil Ochs Fan Club of Canada. The reissue was unauthorized and is considered a bootleg.

The only known review of the single was positive. Reviewing the bootleg release in Dirty Linen, Cliff Furnald wrote that "the band gives a superb look at the Zaire/Kenyan dance style at the time before mass marketing started the diluting downward trend".

Because of the single's limited release, "Bwatue" and "Niko Mchumba Ngombe" were extremely rare. Most Ochs fans never heard the songs before they were included in 1997's American Troubadour. "Niko Mchumba Ngombe" was also included in the 2004 collection Cross My Heart: An Introduction to Phil Ochs.
