= Michael Ochs =

American photographic archivist (1943–2025)

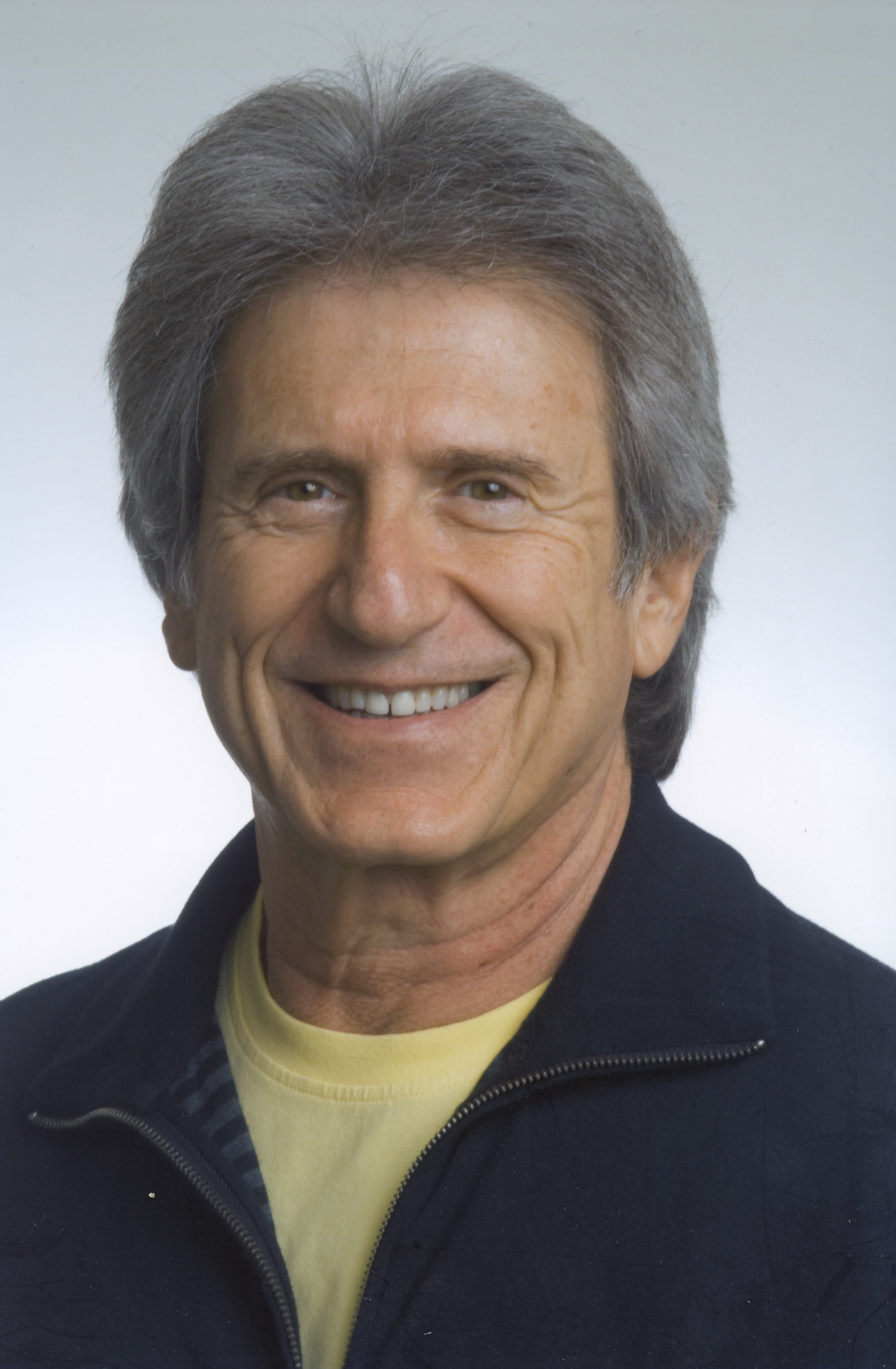
- Born: Michael Andrew Ochs; February 27, 1943; Austin, Texas, U.S.
- Died: July 23, 2025 (aged 82); Los Angeles, California, U.S.
- Education: Adelphi University; Ohio State University
- Occupation: Photographic archivist
- Known for: Collection of rock music photographs
- Relatives: Phil Ochs (brother); Sonny Ochs (sister)

Michael Andrew Ochs (February 27, 1943 – July 23, 2025) was an American photographic archivist best known for his extensive collection of pictures related to rock music dating back to the 1950s and 1960s. The Michael Ochs Archives, located in Venice, California, contained 3 million vintage prints, proof sheets and negatives which were frequently licensed for use in CD reissues, books, films and documentaries.

The Los Angeles Times called Ochs "America's preeminent rock 'n' roll photo archivist" and described his archive as "the dominant force in the rock image marketplace". The New York Times called it "the premier source of musician photography in the world". Ochs sold the archive to Getty Images in 2007.

== Life and career ==
Ochs was born to Jewish parents Jack and Gertrude Ochs on February 27, 1943, in Austin, Texas. He grew up in Ohio and New York. After graduating from Ohio State University in 1966, he worked as a photographer for Columbia Records, shooting such artists as Taj Mahal and the Chambers Brothers.

In the late 1960s, Ochs served as manager for his older brother, the folksinger and protest songwriter Phil Ochs. In the 1970s, Michael Ochs led the publicity departments at Columbia, Shelter and ABC Records.

Ochs began collecting photographs as a hobby. He would allow friends, including rock critics John Morthland and Lester Bangs, to use the pictures for free to illustrate their articles. Ochs began to take a more professional approach after two incidents. First, the Los Angeles Free Press attributed one of his photos to the "Michael Ochs Archives". Then, Dick Clark sent Ochs an unexpected check for $1,000 after Clark used some of Ochs's pictures on a television special.

In 1984, Ochs published Rock Archives: A Photographic Journey Through the First Two Decades of Rock & Roll, which featured an introduction by Peter Guralnick. Writing in The New York Times, Janet Maslin praised Rock Archives as "an amazingly comprehensive photograph collection" that "offers glimpses of just about everyone seen or heard from during rock's first two decades". According to the Los Angeles Times, Rock Archives "put [Ochs's] archives on the map".

During the 1980s, Ochs hosted his Archives Alive radio show on KCRW, taught a History of Rock and Roll class at UCLA Extension, and was music coordinator for the films Hollywood Knights (1980); Liar’s Moon (1981); Losin' It (1983); and Christine (1983).

In 1987, 26 years after the death of photographer Ed Feingersh, Ochs discovered several rolls of negatives of Marilyn Monroe by Feingersh. They included a shoot commissioned by Redbook made during the week March 24–30, 1955. They were the only candid images of Monroe made specifically for publication.

During the 1990s, as record companies reissued large numbers of CDs, they often turned to Ochs for photographs to include in the liner notes. Ochs' pictures are featured in practically every release by Rhino Records and Bear Family Records.

The archive was also tapped for illustrations for books — according to a 2006 New York Times estimate, about half of the rock and roll books issued at the time included photographs from the collection — and as background photos and research material in the production of documentaries, feature films, and television programs.

In 2003 Ochs and fine artist Craig Butler curated The Greatest Album Covers That Never Were, an art exhibit of over 100 contemporary artists creating fantasy album covers of their favorite recording artists. The original exhibition featured works by author Kurt Vonnegut, musicians Graham Nash and Marilyn Manson, photographer William Claxton and artists Ralph Steadman and Robbie Conal. The Rock and Roll Hall of Fame sponsored the exhibition and this non-profit traveling show premiered at their Cleveland museum continuing on to Seattle's Experience Music Project and assorted universities around the country.

Ochs sold the Michael Ochs Archives to Getty Images for an undisclosed amount in February 2007.

Ochs was one of three producers of the 2010 documentary film Phil Ochs: There but for Fortune. The film features interviews with Phil's family, friends, and associates, as well as archival news footage and photographic stills, including selections from Michael's collection.

Ochs died at his home in Los Angeles, California, on July 23, 2025, at the age of 82. At the time of his death, he had Parkinson’s disease for five years, as well as chronic obstructive pulmonary disease (COPD), kidney and heart issues.

== Published works ==
- Rock Archives: A Photographic Journey Through the First Two Decades of Rock & Roll. Introduction by Peter Guralnick. New York: Doubleday & Company, 1984. ISBN 0-385-19434-X
- Feingersh, Ed; LaBrasca, Bob; Michael Ochs Archives (1990), Marilyn : March 1955, Delta, ISBN 978-0-385-30119-0
- Elvis in Hollywood; Michael Ochs; text by Steve Pond; New American Library, 1990; ISBN 0-452-26378-6
- Ochs, Michael (1996). 1000 record covers. Köln: Taschen. ISBN 3-8228-8595-9. OCLC 36529440.
- Marilyn Monroe: From Beginning to End. Text by Michael Ventura; photographs by Earl Leaf from The Michael Ochs Archives, Blanford Press, 1997, ISBN 0713726865
- Shock, RATTLE & ROLL: Elvis Photographed During the Milton Berle Show; Michael Ochs & Ger Riff; 1998; ISBN 0713726903
- The Greatest Album Covers That Never Were. Michael Ochs & Craig Butler, Rock & Roll Hall of Fame & Museum; 2003; ISBN 0-9740078-0-3
