= Here's to the State of Mississippi =

Song by Phil Ochs

from the album I Ain't Marching Anymore
- Released: 1965
- Length: 6:02
- Label: Elektra
- Songwriter: Phil Ochs

"Here's to the State of Mississippi" is a civil rights protest song by Phil Ochs, an American topical singer and songwriter best known for his anti-war and freedom songs. "Here's to the State of Mississippi" was released in 1965 as the last track on his album I Ain't Marching Anymore. The song criticizes the state of Mississippi for its oppression of African Americans. It describes how Jim Crow laws and white supremacy in the South maintained the inequality of African Americans in states such as Mississippi. "Here's to the State of Mississippi" touches on segregation, corrupt and biased school systems, the frequent murders of African Americans and civil rights activists and the crookedness of government officials who ignored or collaborated in the murders. Its refrain advised Mississippi to "find yourself another country to be part of".

Ochs was inspired to write this song following a visit to the state as a volunteer for the Mississippi Caravan of Music. The Caravan worked in conjunction with Freedom Summer, a volunteer-based campaign that began in June 1964. The campaign aimed to register black voters in a place where the voting rights for blacks were nearly non-existent. The Caravan supported the mission of Freedom Summer through motivational songs and participation in campaign projects throughout the state.

Ochs was deeply affected by what he saw and experienced in Mississippi. One incident in particular that shook the Freedom Summer campaign were the murders of Chaney, Goodman, and Schwerner. Within the first month of the Freedom Summer campaign, civil rights activists, James Chaney, Andrew Goodman and Michael Schwerner were arrested in Philadelphia, Mississippi. The three were released after a few hours. However, as they drove through Neshoba County, Mississippi later that day, they were pulled over again and abducted by officers working with the Ku Klux Klan. The three were reported missing and an FBI (Federal Bureau of Investigation) investigation began with a large-scale search of the area. The investigation revealed that the activists were beaten and shot to death. Their bodies were found buried beneath a dam.

Ochs sings, "If you drag her muddy rivers, nameless bodies you will find," which refers to the FBI's search for Chaney, Goodman, and Schwerner. While searching for the three civil rights activists, Navy divers and FBI agents found the mangled bodies of Charles Eddie Moore and Henry Hezekiah Dee, both 19-year-old men who had been kidnapped, beaten and tortured, and then dropped alive into the Mississippi River by Klan members a month earlier. They also found the bodies of 14-year-old Herbert Oarsby and five other African Americans who remain unidentified; none of their kidnappings had attracted attention outside their local communities.

== Adaptation ==
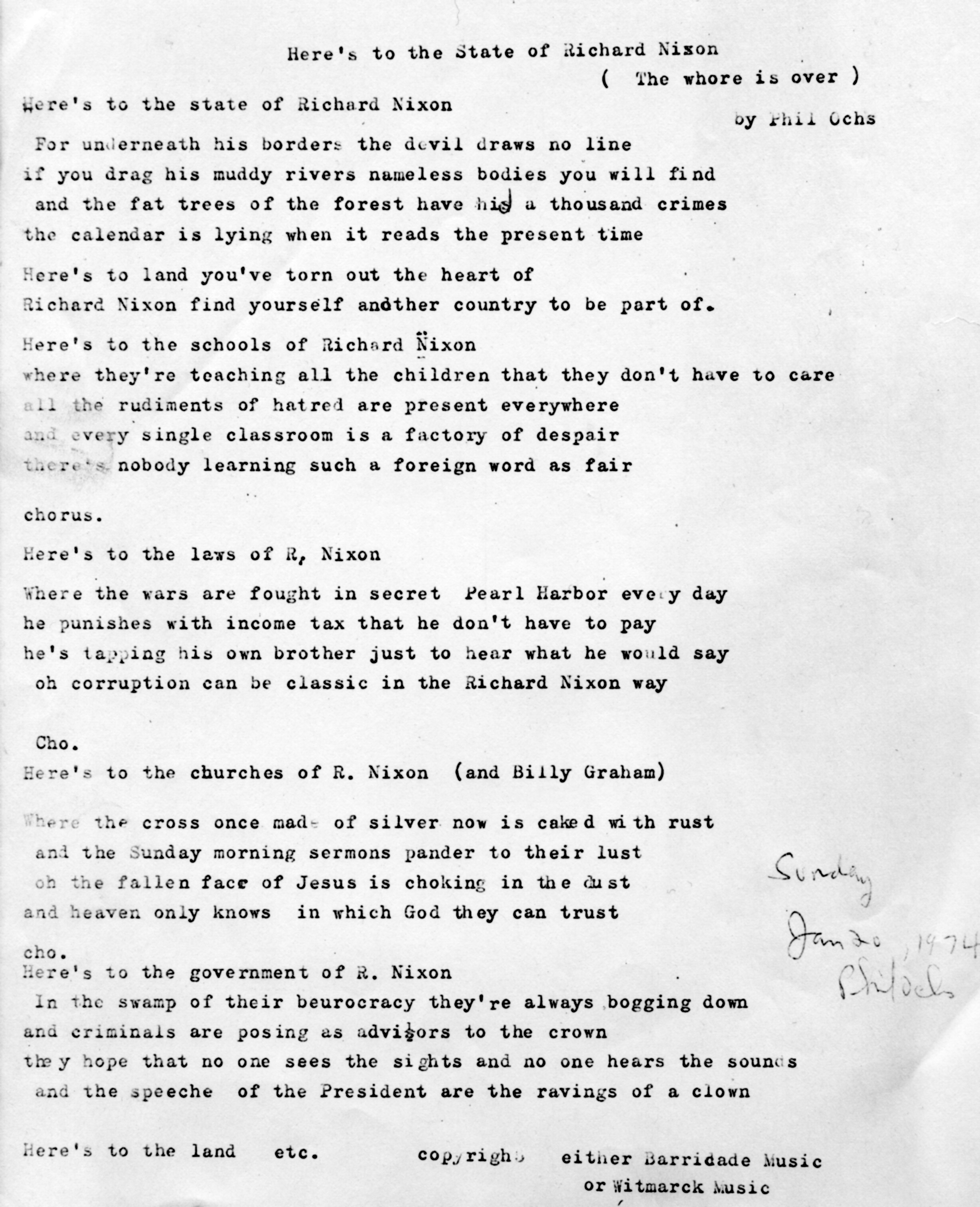
Here's to the State of Richard Nixon

Phil Ochs released the song "Here's to the State of Richard Nixon" as a single in 1974. Ochs replaces 'Mississippi' with 'Richard Nixon' in the lyrics. Ochs also changed some verses to reflect criticisms about the Nixon administration.

== Cover versions ==
Artist	Appearance	Year
Eugene Chadbourne	To Phil	1998
Wyclef Jean	Soundtrack for a Revolution	2009
Katy Moffatt	What's That I Hear?: The Songs of Phil Ochs	1998
Pearl Jam	VH1 Storytellers	2006

== Additional civil rights songs by Phil Ochs ==
- "The Ballad of Medgar Evers" (1964)
- "William Moore" (1964)
- "The Ballad of Oxford" (mid-1960s)
- "Going Down To Mississippi" (mid-1960s)
- "Colored Town" (mid-1960s)
- "Days of Decision" (1965)
- "Love Me, I'm a Liberal" (1966)

== See also ==
- Civil rights movement in popular culture
