= Jim and Jean =

American folk duo

- Genre: Folk
- Years active: 1960s
- Past members: Jim Glover; Jean Ray

Jim and Jean, composed of Jim Glover (1942–2025) and Jean Ray (1941–2007) were an American folk music duo, who performed and recorded music from the early to the late 1960s.

They were married in 1963 and were listed as Jim and Jean Glover in the liner notes of their albums, but went their separate ways after a 1969 divorce.

== Career ==
Glover attended Ohio State University, where he met Phil Ochs in late 1959, introduced Ochs to folk music and Leftist politics, and taught him how to play guitar. Jim Glover and Phil Ochs were in a short-lived folk duo called the "Singing Socialists", later renamed the "Sundowners".

Though the group did not last long, Glover and Ochs remained friends. In 1961, Jim Glover left Ohio and moved to New York City, where he met Jean Ray at the Café Raffio and later fell in love with her. Jim and Jean began performing music together and developed a following at the Café Raffio in Greenwich Village, and soon began making enough money to pay the rent on their Thompson Street apartment.

In 1962, Ochs moved in with Jim and Jean when he was first starting his musical career in Greenwich Village.

Ray introduced Ochs to her friend Alice Skinner, and Ochs soon moved in with Skinner, and eventually married her.

As Glover improved his songwriting, Jim and Jean began to perform (and later recorded) a number of his songs. They were given a big career boost from Art Linkletter, whose longtime secretary was Jean's mother, Lee Ray, and who featured Jim and Jean on his popular TV programs.

Jim and Jean's first appearance on record, Jack Linkletter Presents a Folk Festival, was a live 1963 compilation album released on GNP Crescendo that featured a number of folk acts. In 1965, Jim and Jean released their first full-length album, a self-titled release, on the Philips label. This album contains songs written by Tom Paxton ("Ramblin' Boy" and "Hold On To Me, Babe"), Ochs ("There But For Fortune"), Buffy Sainte-Marie ("Welcome, Welcome Emigrante"), and Lead Belly ("Alabama Bound" and "Relax Your Mind"), as well as traditional songs. Alice Skinner Ochs wrote the original liner notes printed on the back of the album. In 1966, Jim and Jean's second album, Changes, was released on the Verve Folkways record label. The title track was written by Phil Ochs, and the album also contained two other Ochs songs ("Flower Lady" and "Crucifixion"). Ochs also wrote the album's liner notes. This album also contained songs written by Eric Andersen, David Blue, Bob Dylan, and Jim and Jean. The sound on their first album is more folksy, whereas their second album contains more session musicians, instrumentation, and even some folk rock experimentation. They recorded with some musicians who had worked on Bob Dylan's first electric sessions. Their song "One Sure Thing", written by Jean and Harvey Brooks, would later be recorded by Fairport Convention. Jim and Jean's third and final album, People World, was released on Verve Forecast in 1968, and is their furthest departure from their original sound and style. At times, this album delves into some flower power themes and even slight psychedelia. The album also contained more of their own original material than their previous albums. The title track, "People World", reached number 94 on the US Billboard Hot 100 chart in 1968. Also, two Ochs songs appeared on this album: "Cross My Heart" and "Rhythms Of Revolution". This was Jim and Jean's last album as a duo.

During the years they recorded together, Jim and Jean played in folk music clubs such as the Ash Grove in West Hollywood and the Ice House in Pasadena, California. They sometimes opened for Canadian folk rock band 3's a Crowd. In one performance at the Ash Grove, rather than playing as a duo, they were accompanied by a pianist and by the bassist Harvey Brooks, who had played with Dylan.

Eventually, Jim and Jean split up and went their separate ways. Glover recorded some small-budget albums on his own (No Need To Explain in 1980 and Outsider in 2003), and Ray went on to perform in some small-budget plays. They reunited briefly in New York in May 1976 to perform Crucifixion on a televised memorial concert for Phil Ochs, who had died by suicide the previous month. After the Ochs tribute, Jim & Jean would not perform together again for 30 years when they reunited to perform one last show together at The Workman's Circle's People's Voice Cafe in New York City on March 18, 2006. After a long illness, Jean Ray died on August 19, 2007, at age 66.

== Legacy ==
Jim and Jean, as well as other husband-and-wife folk duos of the 1960s (such as Ian and Sylvia and Richard and Mimi Fariña), were described as being inspirations for the fictional characters "Mitch and Mickey" of A Mighty Wind, the 2003 spoof movie about folk music. They are also the inspiration for the husband-and-wife folk-singing duo also called Jim and Jean in the Coen Brothers film Inside Llewyn Davis.

Jean Ray was the inspiration for Neil Young's song "Cinnamon Girl", as verified by her brother Brian Ray, and perhaps other songs as well. Jean Ray said, "Neil Young's song 'Cowgirl in the Sand' came from a visit he made to me and my family living on the beach."
