= There but for Fortune (song) =

1963 song by Phil Ochs

Song by Phil Ochs

from the album New Folks Volume 2
- Published: 1963
- Released: 1964
- Genre: Folk
- Length: 2:11
- Label: Vanguard
- Songwriter: Phil Ochs

"There but for Fortune"

Single by Joan Baez

from the album Joan Baez/5
- B-side: "Daddy, You Been On My Mind" (U.S.) "Plaisir d'amour" (U.K.)
- Released: 1965
- Recorded: October 1964
- Length: 3:11
- Label: Vanguard (U.S.), Fontana (U.K.)
- Songwriter: Phil Ochs
- Producer: Maynard Solomon

Joan Baez singles chronology
"With God on Our Side" (1964)	"There but for Fortune" (1965)	"Cantique de Noel" (1966)

U.K. singles chronology
"We Shall Overcome" (1965)	"There but for Fortune" (1965)	"It's All Over Now, Baby Blue" (1965)

"There but for Fortune" is a song by American folk musician Phil Ochs. Ochs wrote the song in 1963 and recorded it twice, for New Folks Volume 2 (Vanguard, 1964) and Phil Ochs in Concert (Elektra, 1966). Joan Baez also recorded "There but for Fortune" in 1964, and her version of the song became a chart hit. In June 2026, CBS News included the song in its list of the 250 essential American songs of the past 250 years.

== The song ==
"There but for Fortune" consists of four verses, each one of which ends with the line "there but for fortune may go you or I". The first verse is about a prisoner. The second verse describes a homeless person. The third verse is about a drunk who stumbles out of a bar. The final verse describes a country that has been bombed.

One of Ochs' biographers wrote that, "of all the songs that Phil would ever write, none would show his humanity as brilliantly as the four brief verses of 'There but for Fortune'".

The song's title was used as the name of the 1989 compilation album There but for Fortune, which featured material taken from three albums Ochs recorded for Elektra Records between 1964 and 1966. Phil Ochs: There but for Fortune was also used as the title of Michael Schumacher's 1996 biography, as well as Kenneth Bowser's 2011 documentary on the singer's life.

== Ochs recordings ==
Ochs recorded "There but for Fortune" twice. In 1964, he recorded it for the Vanguard compilation New Folks Volume 2. The 1964 recording was reissued on the 2000 compact disc The Early Years.

In 1966, Ochs's concerts at New York's Carnegie Hall and Boston's Jordan Hall were recorded. They were released as Phil Ochs in Concert. One of the songs on In Concert was "There but for Fortune". Ochs introduces the song by sarcastically saying it was written for him by Joan Baez, since many assumed the song was written by the person who had the hit single.

== Baez cover ==
In October 1964, Baez recorded "There but for Fortune" for Joan Baez/5. It was released in the U.S. as a single in June, 1965, with "Daddy, You Been on My Mind", a Bob Dylan song, as the B-side. In July, it was released as a single in the U.K., where its B-side was "Plaisir d'amour".

The single became a Top Ten hit in the U.K., reaching #8. It was also nominated for a Grammy Award for "Best Folk Recording". In the U.S. it peaked at #50 on the Billboard chart — a good showing, but not a hit. In Canada the song reached #27.

By coincidence, Joan Baez in Concert, Part 2 became a #8 hit in the U.K. at the same time "There but for Fortune" did.

Monica Barbaro, portraying Baez in the 2024 Bob Dylan biopic A Complete Unknown, sings the song in a concert scene.

== Baez-Ochs duet ==
The Vietnam War ended on April 30, 1975, and a "War Is Over" rally was held in New York's Central Park on May 11. At the rally, Ochs and Baez sang a duet of "There but for Fortune".

== Other cover versions ==
"There but for Fortune" has been covered by more than a dozen performers besides Baez, including Chad and Jeremy, Eugene Chadbourne, Cher, The Gretchen Phillips Experience, Jim and Jean, The Mike Leander Orchestra, Vicky Leandros (from the 1966 album "Songs und Folklore") The New Christy Minstrels, Peter, Paul and Mary, The Spokesmen, Françoise Hardy, and Sammy Walker. Peter, Paul and Mary's cover features a bridge between the third and fourth verses, containing references to hunger and children, written by Noel Paul Stookey. Also, a French version, "Où va la chance?", with lyrics adapted by Eddy Marnay, was originally performed by Françoise Hardy and later covered by Isabelle Boulay.

== See also ==
- List of anti-war songs
