= Greg Greenway =

American folk singer-songwriter

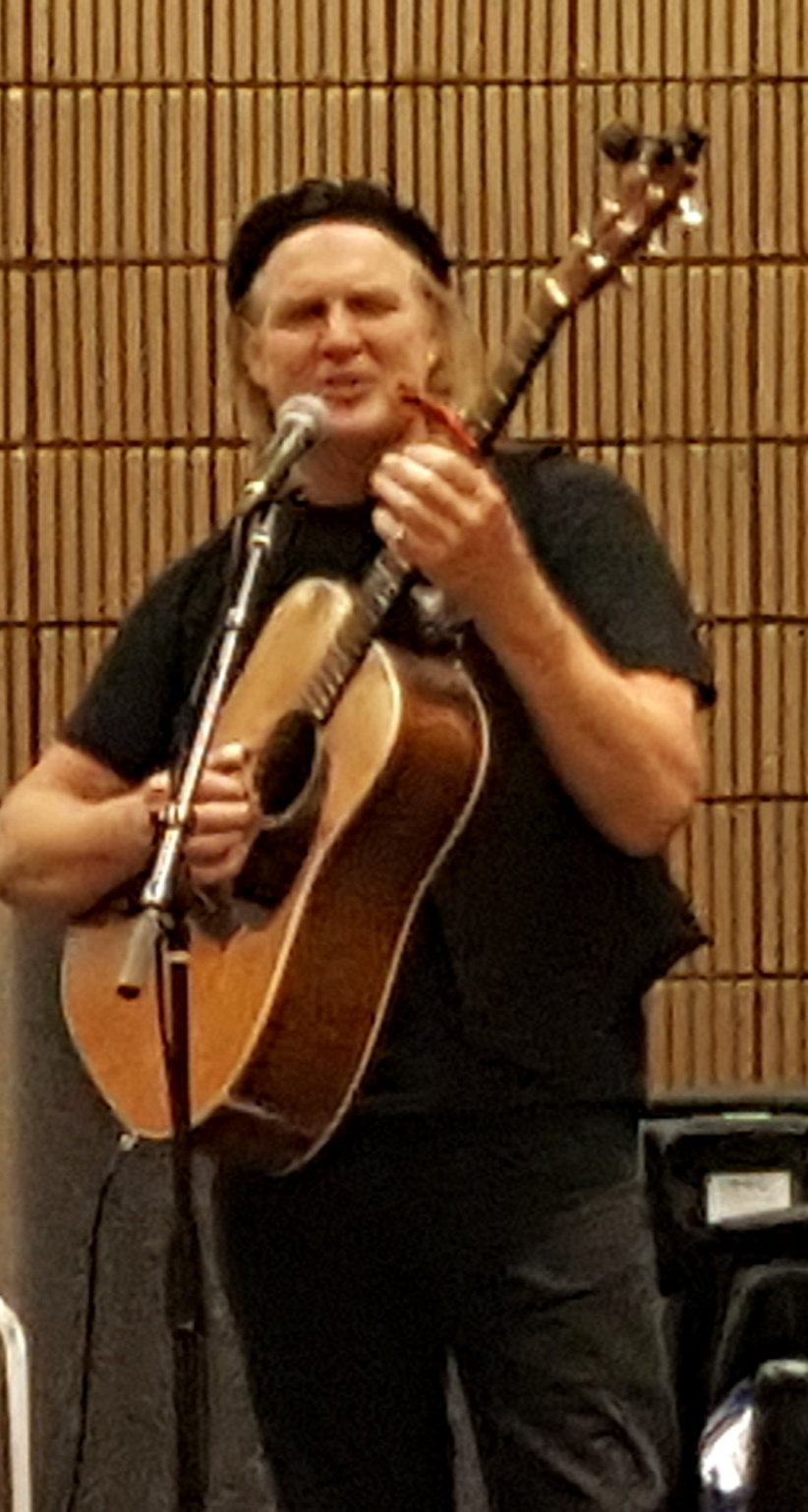
Greg Greenway in concert Deeper Than the Skin

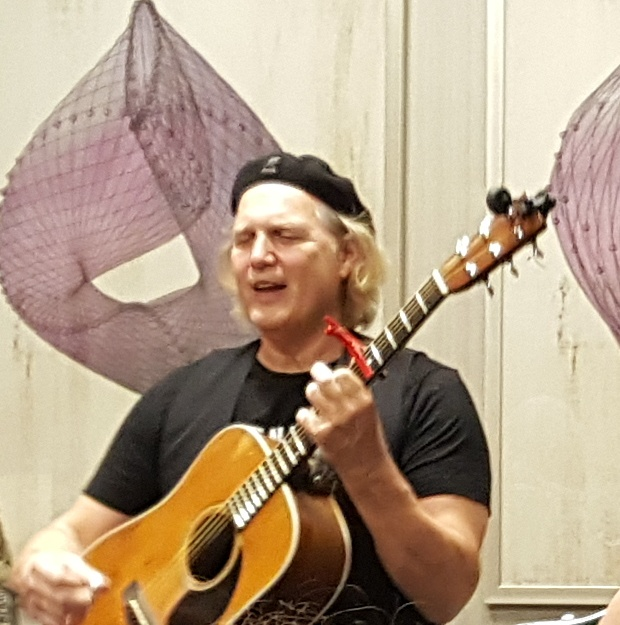
Greg Greenway in concert New Orleans

Greg Greenway (born in Richmond, Virginia, United States) is an American folk singer-songwriter. He is part of the folk scene in the Boston area. His humorous song "Massachusetts" was included on the "Car Talk" radio program. He has eight solo albums and three additional albums with the harmony trio Brother Sun. In 2017 Greg Greenway also embarked on a project with fellow singer-songwriter, Reggie Harris, called Deeper Than The Skin which tours throughout the United States talking about building bridges between the races.

== Discography ==
=== Solo works ===
- A Road Worth Walking Down (1992)
- Singing for the Landlord (1995)
- Mussolini's Head (1998)
- Something Worth Doing (2001)
- Greg Greenway: Live (2003)
- Weightless (2006)
- Standing on the Side of Love (2008)
- 20,000 Versions of the Sun (2016)

=== Brother Sun albums ===
- Brother Sun (2011)
- Some Part of the Truth (2013)
- Weights and Wings (2016)
