= Sammy Walker (singer) =

American singer-songwriter (born 1952)

Sammy Walker (born July 7, 1952 near Atlanta, Georgia) is an American singer-songwriter. Influenced by the folk and country sounds of Bob Dylan, Woody Guthrie and Hank Williams, Walker emerged in the mid-1970s with two albums for the Folkways label and two albums for Warner Brothers. While appearing on Bob Fass's radio show in 1975, he caught the ear of Phil Ochs, who was impressed by the young songwriter and agreed to produce his first album with Folkways. Walker recorded two albums for Warner Brothers under the tutelage of producer Nick Venet, and toured Europe in 1978 and again in 1986. After recording an album of Woody Guthrie songs in 1979, he did not record again until 1989.

Walker, who at least once downplayed his own success by claiming he has "only 50 fans, one in each state", performed an opening set for Ochs at Gerde's Folk City on October 19, 1975, when Ochs drunkenly staged what Ochs billed as the final Phil Ochs concert, and the first John Train performance. Midnight was when Ochs was supposedly changing his stage name to Train, but his inebriated behavior incurred the wrath of the Gerde's staff to the point where the waitress was no longer serving Ochs, amid the soon-to-be-suicidal folksinger's rambling tirades against, among other musings, "Johnny Cash, BEFORE amphetamines". Having finished his set including his signature tune "Closing Time", Walker watched Ochs with apparent embarrassment from the wings. Roger McGuinn was also on the bill for this concert. An uncirculated monochrome videotape and an audience tape converted to a double CDR exist of the event.

Misfit Scarecrow - the first album released by Sammy Walker in over twelve years - was released on July 22, 2008.

Brown Eyed Georgia Darlin' - released in 2016 on Ramseur Records, features early demos from his 1976 release.

The studio version of Days I Left Behind (written by Walker in 1972 and first released on the Sammy Walker album in 1976) featured in the BAFTA and Oscar winning short film An Irish Goodbye (2022), co-written and directed by Tom Berkeley and Ross White.

== Discography ==
- Broadside Ballads, Vol. 8: Song for Patty (Smithsonian Folkways, 1975)
- Sammy Walker (Warner Bros. Records, 1976)
- Blue Ridge Mountain Skyline (Warner Bros. Records, 1977)
- Songs from Woody's Pen (Smithsonian Folkways, 1979)
- Fast Folk Musical Magazine (Vol. 1, No. 2) (Smithsonian Folkways, 1984)
- Sammy Walker in Concert (Brambus Records, 1990)
- Old Time Southern Dream (Brambus, 1994)
- The Best of Broadside 1962-1988: Anthems of the American Underground from the Pages of Broadside Magazine (Smithsonian Folkways, 2000)
- Misfit scarecrow (Ramseur Records, 2008)
- Brown Eyed Georgia Darlin' (Ramseur, 2016)
- Days I Left Behind - Live in Italy 1986 (New Shot Records, 2024)
