= Outside of a Small Circle of Friends =

1967 single by Phil Ochs

Song by Phil Ochs

from the album Pleasures of the Harbor
- Published: 1966
- Released: 1967
- Genre: Topical song
- Length: 3:37
- Label: A&M
- Songwriter: Phil Ochs
- Producer: Larry Marks

"Outside of a Small Circle of Friends"

Single by Phil Ochs
- B-side: "Miranda"
- Released: 1967
- Genre: Topical song
- Length: 3:37
- Label: A&M
- Songwriter: Phil Ochs
- Producer: Larry Marks

Phil Ochs singles chronology
"Cross My Heart" (1967)	"Outside of a Small Circle of Friends" (1967)	"The War Is Over" (1968)

"Outside of a Small Circle of Friends" is a song by Phil Ochs, a U.S. protest singer from the 1960s. "Outside of a Small Circle of Friends", which was originally released on Ochs' 1967 album Pleasures of the Harbor, became one of Ochs' most popular songs.

Ochs was inspired to write "Outside of a Small Circle of Friends" by the case of Kitty Genovese, who was stabbed to death on March 13, 1964, outside her home in Queens, New York, while dozens of her neighbors reportedly ignored her cries for help. The song's refrain, and its title, came from a conversation Ochs had with an acquaintance:

[It] came out of a chance remark, late at night at a coffeehouse. I was talking to a Canadian guy, and he said, "Oh, I'm sure it wouldn't interest anybody outside of a small circle of friends." I said, "What'd you say?" and I picked up a guitar and ZOOM, the chords came right away.

The lyrics of "Outside of a Small Circle of Friends" condemn social apathy by relating different situations that should demand action on the part of the narrator, but in each case the narrator evades responsibility by giving a mundane excuse, and invariably concludes that "I'm sure it wouldn't interest anybody outside of a small circle of friends". The five scenarios include a woman who's being stabbed outside the window, an automobile accident that has left a car hanging on a cliff, the terrible living conditions in the city's ghetto, a magazine publisher who's been fined for publishing pornography, and a friend who's been arrested for smoking marijuana and sentenced to thirty years in prison.

The song's arrangement provides a sharp contrast to its lyrics. For ironic effect Ochs wanted an upbeat arrangement. Producer Larry Marks and pianist Lincoln Mayorga produced an arrangement that is almost as memorable as the lyrics of the song. A decade after the song was recorded, Marks said:

The arrangement added to the irony of the whole song. Tacky piano played by Lincoln and a banjo and small rhythm section, nothing more. It's almost like a saloon song you shouldn't pay any attention to, and the lyric means practically everything in the world.

In 2001, an author remarked that the recording "pitted a disturbing lyric about murder and social irresponsibility against a backing of insanely cheerful banjo and a honky-tonk piano".

== Single versions ==
A&M Records released "Outside of a Small Circle of Friends" as a single in 1967. Reviews were generally positive. Billboard wrote that the record "should put folkster Ochs high on the Hot 100" and the Cleveland Press said that if radio stations "give it a chance, this will be a giant record". Rolling Stone gave the single a mixed review.

The single got a good deal of AM airplay. Sales were fairly good. In Los Angeles, the song reached No. 20. It was No. 119 on Billboard's national "Hot Prospect" listing.

As the song's popularity grew, some radio station managers began to object to the lyrics of the fifth verse of "Outside of a Small Circle of Friends", which said that "smoking marijuana is more fun than drinking beer". Without considering the irony of the lyrics, managers began to complain to A&M.

A&M responded by releasing two alternate versions of the single. One version included the lyrics "smoking [four instrumental notes remain here] is more fun than drinking beer". Another removed the controversial verse altogether. Still, the damage had been done. Record sales suffered and the single lost its momentum. It never advanced further up the charts.

== Cover versions ==
"Outside of a Small Circle of Friends" has been covered by several performers, including Eugene Chadbourne, Dave Van Ronk and Kind Of Like Spitting.
