= Cross My Heart (Phil Ochs song) =

Song by Phil Ochs

from the album Pleasures of the Harbor
- Published: 1966
- Released: 1967
- Genre: Folk rock
- Length: 3:23
- Label: A&M
- Songwriter: Phil Ochs
- Producer: Larry Marks

"Cross My Heart"

Single by Phil Ochs
- B-side: "Flower Lady"
- Released: 1967
- Genre: Folk rock
- Length: 3:23
- Label: A&M
- Songwriter: Phil Ochs
- Producer: Larry Marks

Phil Ochs singles chronology
"I Ain't Marching Anymore" (1966)	"Cross My Heart" (1967)	"Outside of a Small Circle of Friends" (1967)

"Cross My Heart" is a 1966 song by Phil Ochs, an American singer-songwriter best known for the protest songs he wrote in the 1960s.

"Cross My Heart" is the first song on Pleasures of the Harbor (1967), Ochs's first album for A&M Records and his first foray into orchestral instrumentation, or "baroque-folk". The song describes a world in which a person's dreams and plans are not as stable and certain as they seem. Nevertheless, the singer expresses optimism: "But I'm gonna give all that I've got to give, Cross my heart and I hope to live."

Ian Freebairn-Smith arranged the music on "Cross My Heart" and producer Larry Marks recalled that the orchestra had difficulty keeping pace with Ochs, who tended to slow his singing for the bridge and speed up for the verses.

Both Ochs and Marks thought the song might be a hit, so A&M released it as a single in 1967. Billboard included the single among the records it predicted would reach the Hot 100. "Cross My Heart" never reached the charts, nor was it the hit Ochs and Marks had hoped for. Cash Box said that it's a "poetic, mid tempo ballad with classical backing and overall flavor that is closer to pop than folk."

Boston Broadside, in its review of Pleasures of the Harbor, wrote that "Cross My Heart" was "both naive and pretentious ... it suffers from the colorlessness of Ochs' singing".

Beside the orchestrated version of "Cross My Heart" that appeared on Pleasures of the Harbor, a live version of the song from the 1966 Newport Folk Festival, performed by Ochs accompanying himself on guitar, was released in 1996 on the CD Live at Newport. A demo recording of the song was included in the 1997 box set Farewells & Fantasies.

Other performers who have recorded "Cross My Heart" include Eugene Chadbourne, Neil Hamburger and Jim and Jean.
