= Magpie (folk duo) =

American singer-songwriter

Magpie is an American folk music duo. Established in 1973 by Terry Leonino and Greg Artzner in Kent, Ohio, the band's repertoire focuses on topical music and social activism.

== Band history ==
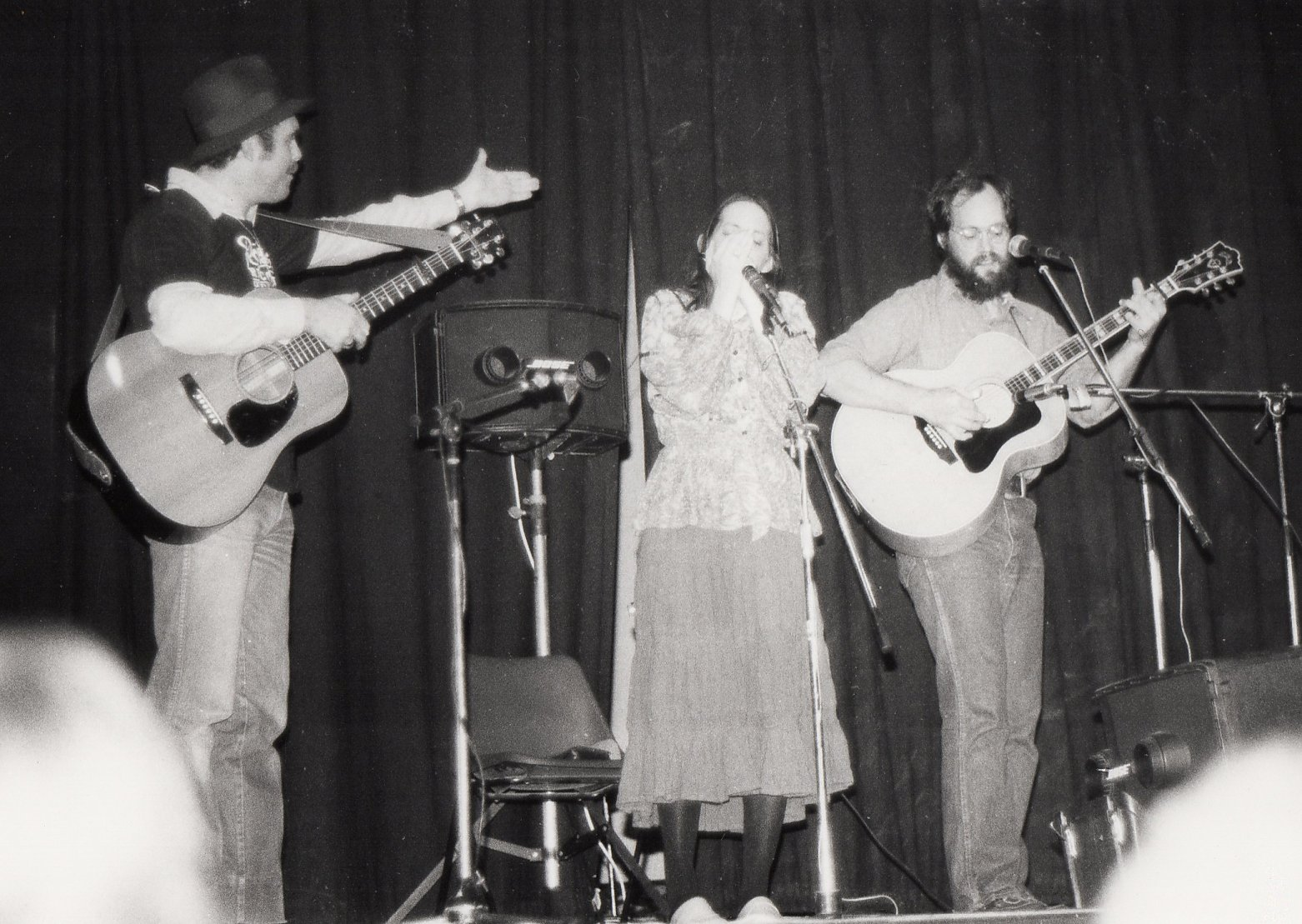
Magpie on stage at the 1981 Norwich Folk Festival, U.K. (being introduced by Dave Peabody)

In addition to its own compositions, Magpie often performs songs by Phil Ochs. After Leonino graduated from Kent State University, the pair soon moved to Washington, D.C. A witness to the Kent State shootings, Terry wrote a song about the tragic event, played at the 25th anniversary commemoration in 1995 and included on the album Give Light. Terry wrote "As a survivor of the massacre at Kent State, for years I tried to write this song. It was difficult and it is still a very painful subject for me and for many others who were on the hill that day in May, 1970. Thanks to the patience and love of my husband I was able to put this pain in to words about that time…" On Earth Day 1998, Magpie performed We Belong to the Earth as a finale to a speech by President Clinton. In 2000, the duo created a musical piece for the Smithsonian Environmental Research Center, Tales of the Blue Crab.

== Awards ==
In 1998, Magpie won the "Wammie" award as traditional folk duo of the year from the Washington Area Music Association. They also received the 1999 Addy Award for their song Take Me Back to Harpers Ferry and their soundtrack for the video, which is on continuous play at Harpers Ferry National Historical Park.

== Discography ==
- Magpie & Friends (1978)
- Working My Life Away (1982)
- If It Ain't Love (1986)
- Living Planet (1990)
- Circle of Life (1992)
- Seed on the Prairie (1994)
- Spoken in Love (with Kim & Reggie Harris) (1995)
- Give Light (1999)
- Guide My Feet (with Kim & Reggie Harris) (1999)
- Sword of the Spirit (2000)
- Last Month of the Year (2002)
- Of Changes and Dreams (2013)
