= Kim and Reggie Harris =

Kim and Reggie Harris are a folk music duo based in upstate New York.

They have released five CDs on the Appleseed Recordings label, and one on the Folk Era label.
