= Fast Folk: A Community of Singers & Songwriters =

Compilation album by Various Artist
- Released: February 26, 2002
- Recorded: Feb 1982 – February 1, 1997
- Genres: Folk music Singer-songwriter
- Label: Smithsonian Folkways

Professional ratings
Review scores
Source	Rating
Allmusic	link
Harp	(favorable)
Sing Out!	(favorable) link

In February 2002, twenty years after the original publication of the magazine Fast Folk, Smithsonian Folkways released a two-CD compilation album of 36 tracks selected from the magazine's fifteen-year history titled Fast Folk: A Community of Singers & Songwriters.

== Track listing ==
Disc 1:

1. "American Jerusalem" (Rod MacDonald) – 5:58
2. "What's Wrong With the Man Upstairs" (David Massengill) – 4:38
3. "Old Factory Town" (Gerry Devine) – 5:12
4. "Just Need a Home (Spotlight)" (Lucy Kaplansky) – 3:38
5. "Another Time and Place" (Dave Van Ronk) – 4:31
6. "I Don't Know Why" (Shawn Colvin) – 3:45
7. "Geza's Wailing Ways" (John Gorka) – 3:53
8. "Ragman!" (David Indian) – 4:03
9. "High Times" (Tom Intondi) – 4:36
10. "Don't Ever Call Your Sweetheart by His Name" (Christine Lavin) – 2:21
11. "Where Were You Last Night?" (Frank Christian) – 4:19
12. "Introduction to Corpo Gracile" (Germana Pucci) – :28
13. "Corpo Gracile" (Germana Pucci) – 5:13
14. "Kilkelly, Ireland" (Laura Burns, Roger Rosen) – 5:58
15. "Introduction to the Viking Rag" (Erik Frandsen) – 1:32
16. "The Viking Rag" (Erik Frandsen) – 2:37
17. "Forget-Me-Not" (Jack Hardy) – 4:20
18. "Vacation" (Bill Bachmann) – 2:41

Disc 2:

1. "Gypsy" (Suzanne Vega) – 4:16
2. "Thirty Thousand Men" (Steve Forbert) – 4:31
3. "Margaret" (Frank Tedesso) – 4:04
4. "Share the Failure" (Elaine Silver) – 2:55
5. "Bourbon as a Second Language" (Patrick John Brayer) – 3:47
6. "King of Hearts" (Paul Kaplan) – 4:10
7. "Heart on Ice" (Judith Zweiman) – 5:04
8. "The Courier" (Richard Shindell) – 5:00
9. "By Your Eyes" (Wendy Beckerman) – 3:22
10. "Danton" (Lillie Palmer) – 4:27
11. "Long Black Wall" (Michael Jerling) – 4:27
12. "Railroad Bill" (Andy Breckman) – 3:32
13. "Gravedigger" (Richard Julian) – 3:18
14. "January Cold" (Richard Meyer) – 5:11
15. "Disenchanted" (Eric Wood) – 4:37
16. "Raphael" (Hugh Blumenfeld) – 3:35
17. "Your Face" (Louise Taylor) – 3:18
18. "Crazy Horse" (Josh Joffen & Late for Dinner) – 3:18
