= List of Smithsonian Folkways artists =

This is a selected list of Smithsonian Folkways musical artists. The artists here were compiled from the index of the book, Worlds of Sound by Richard Carlin, and the featured artists listed on the Smithsonian Folkways website. Not all of the artists listed here recorded exclusively for the Smithsonian Folkways label.

== A ==
- Academy of Maqam
- Rolando Alarcón
- Rahim AlHaj
- Alim and Fargana
- Red Allen
- Almanac Singers
- Jeff Ampolsk
- Arpex
- Sholem Asch
- Clarence "Tom" Ashley

== B ==
- Badakhshan Ensemble
- Ed Badeaux
- Charity Bailey
- Dewey Balfa
- Peter Bartok
- Jake Blount
- Dock Boggs
- Luiz Bonfá
- Arna Bontemps
- Oscar Brand
- Hyman Bress
- Big Bill Broonzy
- Sterling Brown
- Buzz Busby's Bayou Boys
- Brute Force Steel Band

== C ==
- John Cage
- La India Canela
- Nati Cano
- Guy Carawan
- Carter Family
- Frantz Casseus
- Cephas and Wiggins
- John Cohen
- Octavio Corvalan
- Elizabeth Cotten
- The Country Gentlemen
- Henry Cowell (Electronic music pioneer)
- Sis Cunningham

== D ==
- Barbara Dane
- Angela Davis
- Rev. Gary Davis
- Ossie Davis
- Ruby Dee
- Tony DeMarco
- Delmore Brothers
- Hazel Dickens
- Aliu S. Dobo
- Baby Dodds
- Lonnie Donegan
- Michael Doucet

== E ==
- Snooks Eaglin
- Halim El-Dabh (Electronic music pioneer)

== F ==
- Howard Finster
- Flatt and Scruggs
- The Folksmiths
- Alice Foster see Alice Gerrard
- The Freedom Singers
- The Freight Hoppers
- The Fugs
- Blind Boy Fuller

== G ==
- Los Gaiteros de San Jacinto
- Alice Gerrard
- Allen Ginsberg
- Joe Glazer
- Tom Glazer
- Gary Green
- The Greenbriar Boys
- Blind Boy Grunt/Bob Dylan
- José Gutiérrez and Los Hermanos Ochoa
- Nora Guthrie
- Sarah Lee Guthrie
- Woody Guthrie

== H ==
- Hatun Kotama Flute School
- Joe Hickerson
- The Highwaymen
- Roscoe Holcomb
- Lightnin' Hopkins
- Wallace House
- Cisco Houston
- Langston Hughes

== J ==
- Cliff Jackson
- Tommy Jarrell
- Ella Jenkins
- Henry Jacobs (Experimental electronic musician)
- Johnson family (bluegrass band)
- Johnson Mountain Boys
- James Johnson
- Lonnie Johnson

== K ==
- Paul Kaplan
- Lucy Kaplansky
- The Kentuckians
- Kronos Quartet
- Pete Kuykendall
- Kaia Kater

== L ==
- La Drivers Union Por Por Group
- Peter La Farge
- Alladin Langa
- Noor Mohmad Langa
- Shumar Khan Langa
- Lead Belly
- Walter "Furry" Lewis
- Guy Logson
- Lord Invader
- Los Camperos de Valles
- Los Pleneros de la 21
- Los Reyes de Albuquerque
- Los Texmaniacs
- Otto Luening (Electronic music pioneer)
- June Lazare

== M ==
- Ewan MacColl
- Uncle Dave Macon
- Rafael Manriquez
- Roberto Martínez
- Tito Matos
- Bill McAdoo
- Kirk McGee
- Sam McGee
- Julius Meytuss (Electronic music pioneer)
- Alan Mills
- Dan Milner
- Elizabeth Mitchell
- Bill Monroe
- Alexander Mossolov (Electronic music pioneer)

== N ==
- New Lost City Ramblers
- Jim Nollman

== O ==
- Phil Ochs
- Mohammad Omar

== P ==
- Tom Paley
- Hap Palmer
- Suni Paz
- Paschall Brothers
- Peace Kawomera (Delicious Peace) Fair Trade Cooperative

== R ==
- Bernice Johnson Reagon
- Toshi Reagon
- Red Clay Ramblers
- Ralph Rinzler
- Jean Ritchie
- Paul Robeson
- Jorge Rodriguez
- Russell Rodriguez
- Kevin Roth
- Pee Wee Russell

== S ==
- Homayun Sakhi
- Jim Savarino
- Frank Schildt
- Tracy Schwarz
- Earl Scruggs
- Mike Seeger
- Peggy Seeger
- Pete Seeger
- Skillet Lickers
- Memphis Slim
- Muggsy Spanier
- Joseph Spence
- Mark Spoelstra
- Horace Sprott
- Roger Sprung
- Son de Madera
- Lucy Stewart
- Bobby Susser
- Roosevelt Sykes

== T ==
- Art Tatum
- Studs Terkel
- Saunders Terrell see Sonny Terry
- Sonny Terry
- Tony Trischka

== U ==
- Vladimir Ussachevsky (Electronic music pioneer)

== V ==
- Aba Veydo

== W ==
- Wade Ward
- Doc Watson
- Josh White
- Big Joe Williams
- Chet Williams
- Lucinda Williams
- Mary Lou Williams
