= Carolyne Mas =

American singer-songwriter

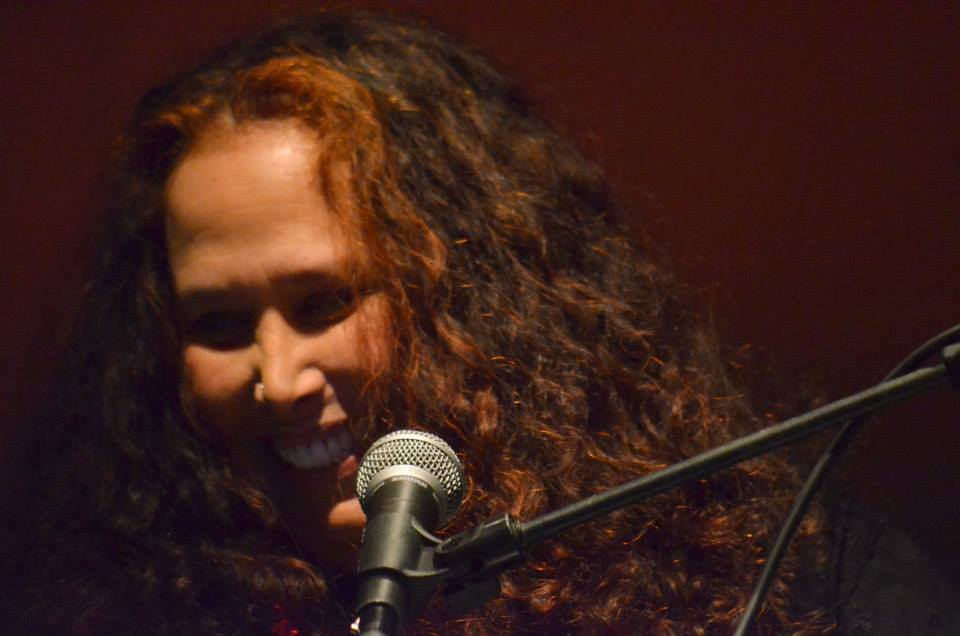
- Mas in 2014

Background information
- Born: Carol Patricia Mas; October 20, 1955 (age 70)
- Origin: Bronxville, New York, United States
- Genres: Rock; alternative; pop rock
- Occupations: Singer; songwriter; musician
- Instruments: Vocals, guitar, piano, percussion
- Years active: 1973–present
- Labels: Mercury Records; SPV GmbH; Route 61 Music
- Spouse: Esteban Agustinho (m. 1993)
- Website: moremasmusic.com

Carol Patricia Mas (born October 20, 1955), professionally known as Carolyne Mas, is an American singer-songwriter, guitarist, pianist, and producer. She broke out of the Greenwich Village music scene boom of the late 1970s, along with other artists such as Steve Forbert, The Roches, and Willie Nile. She is credited with having started the Songwriter's Workshop at the Cornelia Street Cafe in 1977, which later went on to become the Songwriter's Exchange, featuring singer-songwriters such as Jack Hardy and Suzanne Vega. Although she remains relatively unknown in the United States, except for a loyal cult of fans, she managed to gain popularity in Europe and Canada, mostly due to the use of television as a promotional tool in these markets. Her records did well in the charts in Canada, but her greatest success was in Germany, where a live album, Mas Hysteria, was released by Phonogram. It was originally intended to promote her upcoming appearance on Rockpalast in January 1981, and included her most significant hit, "Sittin' in the Dark".

== Life and career ==
Mas became well known for her energetic live shows, especially from 1979 to 1981 while signed to Mercury Records. She recorded three albums while with Mercury: Carolyne Mas (1979), Hold On (1980), and Modern Dreams (1981). She was often hailed as being the female Bruce Springsteen, a distinction that served to set her apart from her female contemporaries. She toured the United States, Canada, and Europe extensively with a band of musicians which included David Landau (the brother of Bruce Springsteen's manager, Jon Landau), Crispin Cioe of the Uptown Horns (who later went on to play with the Rolling Stones and Billy Joel), bassist Ivan Elias (1950–1995; who played with Scandal from 1981 to 1985), drummer Bobby Chouinard (1953–1997; who also played with Billy Squier), and keyboardist Charlie Giordano (who would eventually go on to become a member of Bruce Springsteen's E Street Band after playing several years with Pat Benatar). Her association with Springsteen included her involvement in the 3M benefit at the Stone Pony on January 19, 1986, and the "Jersey Artists for Mankind" project in May 1986, while she was living at the Jersey Shore.

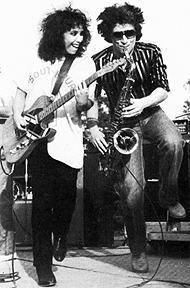
Mas and Cioe, 1980

Mas moved to Bremen, Germany, in 1989 where she continued to tour and record. She was signed to SPV GmbH from 1990 to 1993, and released three albums for them: Action Pact, which was recorded in Springfield, Missouri, in 1988 with the Skeletons/the Morells; a live album entitled Live!, recorded at Jovel Music Hall in Münster, Germany, in November 1990; and a studio album, Reason Street, which was recorded in Bremen in 1992 and produced by Charlton Pettus, her friend at the time, who is now a member of the band Tears for Fears.

From 1989 to 1993, Mas toured throughout Germany, performing also in Austria and Hungary. In August 1990, she performed on a television show in Moscow, which was broadcast to 400 million viewers. Mas returned to the United States in September 1993.

In 1999, Mas reunited with producer-guitarist Steve Burgh (1950–2005), who had produced her first two albums, Carolyne Mas and Hold On, while she was signed to Mercury Records twenty years before. They recorded an album's worth of material at Burgh's studio, Baby Monster, in New York City. For these sessions she was also reunited with keyboardist Giordano and guitarist-keyboardist Charlton Pettus. The album is called Brand New World and was released by Mas in 2005, subsequent to Burgh's untimely death, as a tribute to him.

Mas currently lives in Arizona with her husband and son. After completing one year at Cochise College with highest honors and being inducted into the Phi Theta Kappa International Honor Society, she transferred to Arizona State University (ASU) in order to pursue a Bachelor of Science in Integrative Health. In February 2017, she was inducted into ASU's chapter of the National Society of Collegiate Scholars, and in January 2018, she was inducted into ASU's chapter of the Golden Key International Honor Society. On May 6 of 2019, Mas graduated summa cum laude from ASU, where she was also chosen outstanding student and selected to represent her degree plan at the Edson College of Nursing and Healthcare convocation on May 7 of the same year. Mas graduated with a Master of Science in Medical Nutrition on May 3, 2021, and she is currently pursuing a Ph.D. in Integrative and Functional Nutrition at Saybrook University.

Although semi-retired from the music business, Mas occasionally performs in New York City, Germany, and Italy, where she released a studio album entitled Across the River on Italian label Route 61 Music in October 2013. In a May 30, 2019 article in Billboard Magazine, New York radio legend Jim Kerr, formerly of WPLJ, singled out Mas when recalling his many years at the now defunct rock station.

== Discography ==
=== Albums ===
- Carolyne Mas (1979) - AUS #51
- Hold On (1980)
- Mas Hysteria (1980)
- Modern Dreams (1981)
- Action Pact (1989)
- Live ! (1992)
- Reason Street (1993)
- Beyond Mercury (2003)
- Brand New World (2005)
- Across the River (2013)
- Live in Germany 1981 (2014)
- Somebody like Me (43 Tracks live + Studio, recorded in Germany 1989–1993, download only, 2014)
- Let's Come together - Live in Bremen 1989 (2022)

=== Singles ===
- "Stillsane" (1979) (Canada No. 53, US No. 71, AUS NO. 44)
- "Quote Goodbye Quote" (1979) (Canada No. 60; UK No. 71)
- "Driving on the Radio" (1993)
