= Marilyn Jaye Lewis =

American writer

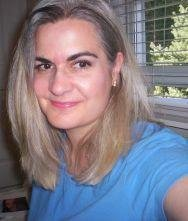
- Marilyn Jaye Lewis, 2007
- Born: July 22, 1960 (age 66); Columbus, Ohio, U.S.
- Occupation: Writer
- Spouse: Chong Foun Kee 1981-1990 Gaylon Wayne Lewis 1993-2007
- Writing career
- Genres: Fiction, Memoirs, Screenwriting
- Notable awards: Ohio Independent Screenplay Award, Best Voice of Color Screenplay 2013 for Tell My Bones: The Helen LaFrance Story Independent Publisher Book Awards, Silver Medal 2011 for Freak Parade
- Website: www.marilynjayelewis.com

Marilyn Jaye Lewis (born July 22, 1960 in Columbus, Ohio) is an American writer and editor of novels, short stories, memoirs, screenplays and teleplays. Lewis grew up in Cleveland, Ohio in the 1960s. Lewis began writing during her preteen years. She spent her high school years in Columbus before moving to New York City in 1980. She initially focused her creative energies mainly on singing and songwriting, before beginning to write more fiction in the 1980s. Lewis studied recording and audio engineering in New York. She worked there as a singer-songwriter under the name Marilyn Jaye, and later under her married name, Marilyn Jaye Lewis, until 1994. During those years, Lewis performed at such iconic New York clubs as SpeakEasy, Folk City and CBGB. Lewis was included twice in Fast Folk Musical Magazine, Jack Hardy's music magazine, recorded on vinyl. Those recordings are now in the Smithsonian Collection and available on Smithsonian Folkways. Lewis appeared on Volume 1, No. 6 with her song "Breaking Glass." Her song "One Thing Leads to Another" was included in Volume 1, No. 10.

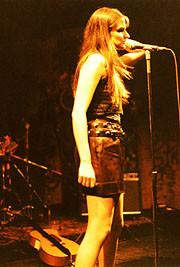
Marilyn Jaye Lewis onstage at CBGB in 1984.

By the mid-1990s her work consisted of writing fiction exclusively.

Her screenplay Tell My Bones won the Ohio Independent Screenplay Award in the Best Voice of Color category in 2013.

In 2013, Lewis wrote a TV pilot called Cleveland's Burning which was a semi-finalist in the Industry Insider Television Writing Contest. The program is a family drama following an African American family in Cleveland as they react to the turmoil of the 1960s.

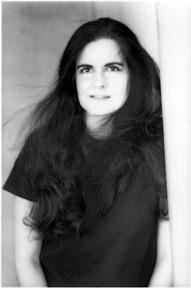
Marilyn Jaye Lewis, 2002

== Awards ==
- Semifinalist, 2013 Industry Insider Television Writing Contest for Cleveland's Burning
- Best Voice of Color Screenplay, 2013 Ohio Independent Screenplay Award for Tell My Bones: The Helen LaFrance Story
- Silver Medal, 2011 Independent Publisher Book Awards for Freak Parade
- Finalist, 2000 William Faulkner Creative Writing Competition for The Curse of Our Profound Disorder
- Award winner, 2000 New Century Writer Awards for The Curse of Our Profound Disorder

== Works ==
=== Screenplays ===
- Cleveland's Burning, 2012
- Tell My Bones: The Helen LaFrance Story

=== Historical novels ===
- Twilight of the Immortal, Anaphora Literary Press, CreateSpace, 2011, ISBN 1-4609-0412-5, ISBN 978-1-4609-0412-1

=== Novels ===
- 1954 Powder Blue Pickup, (Lulu, 2021).
- The Guitar Hero Goes Home, (Lulu, 2021).
- Freak Parade, Amazon Digital Services, Inc., 2010, ISBN 0557472407
- When the Night Stood Still: An Erotic Romance, Magic Carpet Books, 2004, ISBN 0-9726339-7-9
- When Hearts Collide: An Erotic Romance, Magic Carpet Books, 2003, ISBN 0-9726339-1-X
- In the Secret Hours, Magic Carpet Books, 2003, ISBN 0-9726339-4-4

=== Short stories ===
- Neptune and Surf, Masquerade Books, 1999, ISBN 1-58419-001-9
- Half-Moon Bride, (Lulu, 2021), ISBN 9780557946143
- The Muse Revisited, (3 volumes, Smashwords,).
