= Fast Folk =

American magazine

- Cover art by Norman Rockwell
- Editor: Jack Hardy (1982–1986); Richard Meyer (1986–1997)
- Categories: Music magazines Folk music
- Frequency: Monthly / irregular
- Circulation: ~1000 (as of 1992)
- First issue: February 1982
- Final issue: 1997
- Country: United States
- Language: English

Fast Folk Musical Magazine (originally known as The CooP) was a combination magazine and record album published from February 1982 to 1997. The magazine acted as a songwriter/performer cooperative, and was an outlet for singer-songwriters to release their first recordings.

== History ==
In December 1977, singer-songwriter Carolyne Mas started a songwriter's night at The Cornelia Street Cafe in Greenwich Village, New York, after a less formal group started by singer-songwriter/Greenwich Village legend Jack Hardy lost its spot at a local tavern called The English Pub. The group, which included artists like Jack Hardy, Carolyne Mas, David Massengill, Tom Intondi, Cliff Eberhardt, Michael Fracasso, Matthias Clark, Jeff Gold, and Rod MacDonald, gave writers a chance to perform for their peers, work on songs in front of an audience, and receive feedback from fellow songwriters. This group, sans some members, and with some new members added, eventually became known as the Songwriter's Exchange, recording an album on Stash Records which was released in 1980. The album was made possible due to the efforts of Robin Hirsch, one of the owners of The Cornelia Street Cafe, who single-handedly had turned the increasingly popular café into a hotbed of artists, musicians, poets, and writers. The Greenwich Village music scene was also booming at the time, receiving much media attention from major newspapers like The New York Times, which also helped fuel the popularity of the New York singer-songwriter scene in general. The Songwriter's Exchange eventually evolved, and under the guidance of Jack Hardy, and his partner, the group formed a cooperative in the already established Speak Easy club at 107 Macdougal run by various members of the community, including Angela Page who found the club with Vinnie Vok as a possible outlet for 24/7 folk music. She took over the booking of Greenwich Village's SpeakEasy in 1981 and later Rod MacDonald. The CooP, which was launched in February 1982, was later renamed Fast Folk, and gained status as a non-profit organization. Members of the cooperative packaged the LPs in the Speak Easy space and sent them out to those who paid the low fee of 2 bucks to get a record.

The organization formed at a time when the cost of recording equipment and packaging of vinyl LPs were prohibitively expensive for the independent artist. The organization managed to document serious, non-commercial songwriting first in the form of vinyl LPs and later as CDs. Although many of the writers were active in the Greenwich Village scene, the magazine included artists from across the United States and some international artists. Some of the included writers went on to commercial success, and some became influences in newly formed musical genres such as alternative country and anti-folk.

Alumni who recorded first for Fast Folk include Grammy Award-winners Lyle Lovett, Suzanne Vega, Julie Gold, Tracy Chapman and Shawn Colvin, as well as John Gorka, Michelle Shocked, Suzy Bogguss, Rod MacDonald, Christine Lavin, Richard Shindell, Marilyn Jaye Lewis and Lucy Kaplansky of Cry Cry Cry and Jack himself. The Smithsonian reports 98 releases with 1,389 cuts.

== Smithsonian Folkways Recordings ==
Smithsonian Folkways Recordings, now maintains an archive of Fast Folk which includes the master recording tapes, magazines and paper records of the organization.

They also released a compilation album titled Fast Folk: A Community of Singers & Songwriters.
