= Gregg Cagno =

American singer-songwriter

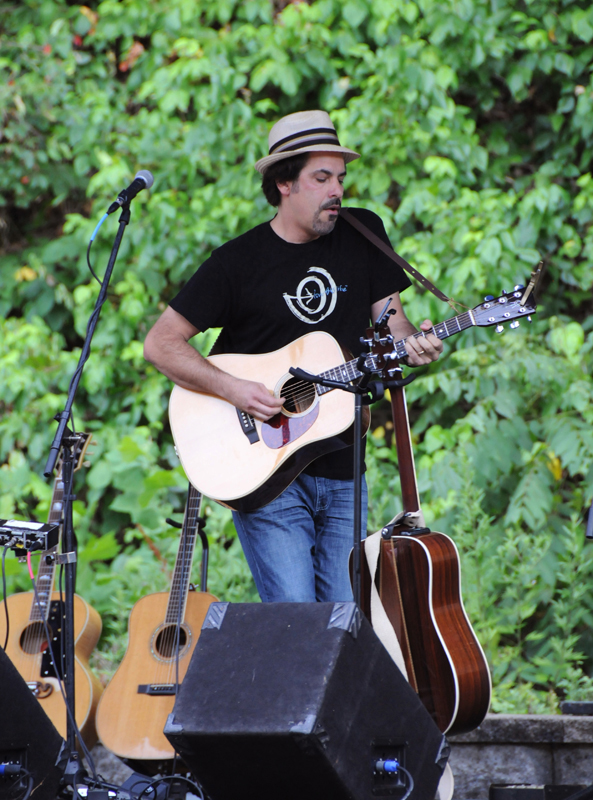
Cagno performing in 2012

Gregg Cagno is an American songwriter and touring performer in the singer-songwriter and folk genres.

== Career ==
Born in 1969, Cagno grew up in Clinton, New Jersey and now lives in Winston-Salem, North Carolina. He is a 2006 ASCAP award winner in the folk category, and was a finalist in the Kerrville Folk Festival's prestigious New Folk competition. Cagno has performed throughout North America in venues including The John F. Kennedy Center for the Performing Arts' Millennium Stage, Godfrey Daniels, Club Passim, Eddie's Attic, and Falcon Ridge Folk Festival. He currently records for Black Potatoe Records.

Mostly appearing solo, Cagno is sometimes accompanied by Jimmy Heffernan on Dobro. In addition to performing, Cagno has taught songwriting and guitar workshops for the NJ State Teen Arts Festival and Young Composers festival.

Cagno's song "In Her Own Eyes" (co-written with Robert Meitus) is in the Smithsonian Folkways Recordings archives with the fast folk catalog. The title track of his first CD "Backroad Driver" was featured on NPR's Car Talk. His tune "Just the 3 of Us" was an award winner at the 2002 South Florida Folk Festival.

Cagno learned his craft, and perfected his smooth baritone voice, as a teenager playing and volunteering at the Godfrey Daniels stage in Bethlehem, Pennsylvania. He began playing out regularly while a student at Rutgers University, and became a core of New Jersey's flourishing acoustic scene in the early 1990s (loosely centered on musician Spook Handy's weekly open mikes at New Brunswick's Corner Tavern). It was during this time that he met and began occasionally performing with Linda Sharar. After college, Cagno moved to Hoboken, New Jersey and quickly established himself as a leading figure in what was then one of the most important alt music scenes in America.

In 1995, Cagno teamed up with Sharar and Christian Bauman (Cagno and Bauman attended North Hunterdon High School together) and the bands The Marys, Big Happy Crowd and The Amazing Incredibles to create the musical collective Camp Hoboken. The name Camp Hoboken came from Cagno's regular camping spot at the Falcon Ridge Folk Festival. The artists collaborated on songs and performances until 1999, and released two recordings. Sharar, Cagno, and Bauman often toured under the Camp Hoboken name, frequently with the late Rachel Bissex. In interviews with National Public Radio and on Vin Scelsa's Idiot's Delight, Bauman said that the Camp Hoboken era was the basis for his third novel "In Hoboken" (2008) and that the character of James was loosely based on Gregg Cagno.

== Discography ==
- Backroad Driver (1994)
- Tales From Sixth & Clinton (1997)
- Present Moment Days (2000)
- Simple Gifts (2002)
- Worth The Wait (2014)
