= American Jerusalem =

Song by Rod MacDonald

from the album No Commercial Traffic
- Released: 1983
- Genre: folk music
- Length: 5:55
- Label: Cinemagic Records
- Songwriter: Rod MacDonald

"American Jerusalem" is a song written by singer-songwriter and guitarist Rod MacDonald in 1978. Considered his "signature tune", the nearly-six-minute long song first appeared on MacDonald’s 1983 debut album No Commercial Traffic (originally on Cinemagic Records, reissued by Blue Flute Music).

== Recording and Rights ==
MacDonald re-recorded the song for his 2009 CD After the War, with Gary Burke (drums), Pete Levin (keyboards), Mark Dann (bass), JP Bowersock (guitar) and Tracy Grammer (harmony vocals).

The publishing rights to "American Jerusalem" were acquired in 1985 by Dick James Music, which later sold its entire catalogue to PolyGram International; it is currently the property of Universal Music.

== Context ==
Called "a brilliant contrast of rich and poor, of the powerful and the powerless in Manhattan", the song also presages some of the September 11, 2001 events with such lines as “in the ashes of American Jerusalem/the prophets live their deaths out on the corner/the pretty people say there should have been a warning/but nobody heard it” and “then shadows lick the sun/the streets are paved with footsteps on the run.”

When Smithsonian Folkways re-released Fast Folk: A Community of Singers & Songwriters from the vaults of Fast Folk's seminal collection of 200 songwriters and 600 songs dating back to 1982, a live performance of "American Jerusalem" by MacDonald at NYC’s Bottom Line was the opening track.

== Covers and reception ==
The song was covered by Canadian singer-songwriter Garnet Rogers on his album The Outside Track in 1986 (reissued in 2004 by the Canadian label Snow Goose).

It was also covered by Shawn Colvin on her 2012 Nonesuch debut All Fall Down. The Australian praised her version saying "the immediate stand-out track is her cover of Rod MacDonald's "American Jerusalem", featuring a beautiful harmony from Emmylou Harris."

All Music Guide said in its review: “American Jerusalem and the title tune are thoughtful, pointed commentaries on the state of the union in 2012”. Performing Songwriter magazine, called Colvin's version of the song "stunning", asked her "Your cover choices, as always, are terrific. Was Rod MacDonald’s 'American Jerusalem' one you used to perform in the early days of your career?" Colvin replied "Yeah … forever ago. In the early 80s before I started writing I’d perform it in Greenwich Village at the Cottonwood Café. I think that song’s more reminiscent of the New York that I—for want of a better phrase—grew up in, in my 20s. It was a little bleaker. So that’s kind of a little snapshot of New York when I first got there and didn’t know anybody and I was getting used to living in this … jungle. I’m so glad I finally recorded it."
