= Center for Folklife and Cultural Heritage =

Smithsonian Institution cultural center in the U.S.

The Center for Folklife & Cultural Heritage (CFCH) is one of three cultural centers within the Smithsonian Institution in the United States. Its motto is "culture of, by, and for the people", and it aims to encourage understanding and cultural sustainability through research, education, and community engagement. The CFCH contains (numerically) the largest collection in the Smithsonian, but is not fully open to the public. (Note: It is open to guest researchers and other visitors by appointment.) Its budget comes primarily from grants, trust monies, federal government appropriations, and gifts, with a small percentage coming from the main Smithsonian budget.

The center is composed of three distinct units. The Smithsonian Folklife Festival is planned and implemented annually by the Festival staff at the Folklife center. The Smithsonian Folkways Record label comprises a second team working at the center; they produce this non-profit music label with the goal of promoting and supporting the cultural diversity of sound. The third team at CFCH manages and curates the Ralph Rinzler Folklife Archives and Collections. While the archive, filled with paper documentation and other memorabilia, is traditionally considered to be museum material, the other two sections exemplify more accurately the direction CFCH is headed, with a "shift from reified and ossified discourses of 'preservation' to more dynamic and ecological models of sustainability". Instead of collecting and curating objects, both the Festival and the Folkways units at CFCH collect, research, and produce experiences.

The compound name, Center for Folklife & Cultural Heritage, epitomizes an ongoing transition within the field of cultural studies. In concatenated form, it documents the shift from folklore to cultural heritage that has taken place in academics and in fieldwork within the last 15 years.

The CFCH is one of several federal institutions to have related mandates. The American Folklife Center, at the nearby Library of Congress, limits its scope to American Folklife in contrast to the international scope of the CFCH. The National Endowment for the Arts, also headquartered in Washington, D.C., offers support and funding to both new and established art media. As such, it overlaps with topical arts programs brought to the National Mall each summer during the Smithsonian Folklife Festival. The National Park Service has as one of its objectives the preservation of historic sites, partnering with CFCH in their concerns for the cultural sustainability of both tangible and natural cultural resources.

== Terminology ==
A plethora of newly minted compound concepts have been introduced into the vocabulary and discussion of culture since the turn of the century. The topics and research areas that had been labeled as folklore and folklife are increasingly rebranded as topics within the purview of cultural studies.

This linguistic shift can be documented more precisely in the language of the UNESCO treaties. At a meeting in 1989, they published a "Recommendation on the Safeguarding of Traditional Culture and Folklore". This paper defines the field as folklore and uses that term throughout its paper:

Folklore (or traditional and popular culture) is the totality of tradition-based creations of a cultural community, expressed by a group or individuals and recognized as reflecting the expectations of a community in so far as they reflect its cultural and social identity; its standards and values are transmitted orally, by imitation or by other means. Its forms are, among others, language, literature, music, dance, games, mythology, rituals, customs, handicrafts, architecture and other arts.

By 2003, the follow-up treaty was entitled the Convention for the Safeguarding of the Intangible Cultural Heritage. Once again the subject matter was defined:

Intangible Cultural Heritage means the practices, representations, expressions, knowledge, and skills – as well as the instruments, objects, artifacts and cultural spaces associated therewith – that communities, groups and, in some cases, individuals recognize as part of their cultural heritage. This intangible cultural heritage, transmitted from generation to generation, is constantly recreated by communities and groups in response to their environment, their interaction with nature and their history, and provides them with a sense of identity and continuity, thus promoting respect for cultural diversity and human creativity.

In the space of 15 years on the international playing field folklore has been rebranded as cultural heritage. It is this contemporary shift that CFCH bridges in its compound title of Folklife & Cultural Heritage.

== History ==
This eclectic collection of artifacts and activities came together at the Center for Folklife & Cultural Heritage through a series of unplanned events. It began with the first Festival of American Folklife in 1967.

In 1964 the new Smithsonian secretary, S. Dillon Ripley, arrived in Washington with an innovative museum concept: he challenged curators to "take the objects out of their cases and make them sing". To facilitate this, Ripley appointed James R. Morris as the Smithsonian's first Director of Museum Services. Morris had no professional museum experience. Nevertheless, he proposed to stage an outdoor festival on the National Mall during the summer, building on his previous career as both performer and manager in the music industry. Using the (by then) well-established National Folk Festival as a model, he wanted to exhibit and celebrate different folk traditions from across the nation. This was non-standard for the Smithsonian, and guaranteed to provoke curators accustomed to operating in orderly museum buildings.

Once approved by Ripley, Morris hired Ralph Rinzler to help him produce this festival for the upcoming summer 1967. Rinzler had previously worked at the Newport Folk Festival, and brought with him both the know-how and connections needed to pull together a new DC folk festival. The first Festival of American Folklife, with a budget of $4,900 and showcasing 84 participants, took place over the Fourth of July weekend 1967 on the National Mall and on the plaza of the Museum of History and Technology. By the time of the Bicentennial Celebration 10 years later, the DC Folklife Festival had been incorporated into the festivities for the national party with activities scheduled throughout the summer. It had a seven million-dollar budget, lasted twelve weeks and involved five thousand artists from every region in the United States and from 35 other nations. Morris and Rinzler were named Washingtonians of the Year. Following the Bicentennial Festival, Morris went on to other positions in the Smithsonian complex. Rinzler continued in the Festival organization, originally as part of the Smithsonian's Division of Performing Arts until a separate Office of Folklife Programs was created in 1980.

Now that the festival organization and model were well established, Rinzler began to explore other varieties of folklife productions appropriate for a national museum. He spearheaded the protracted negotiations to purchase the Folkways music collection from Moe Asch, including both recordings and business files. These were successfully concluded in 1987, and this collection became the core of the Ralph Rinzler Folklife Archives and Collections, a rich resource for the study of folk culture and music. The recordings were bundled into the Smithsonian Folkways label.

In 1998, the Festival was renamed the Smithsonian Folklife Festival to reflect its international interests, and in 1999 the office was renamed the Center for Folklife & Cultural Heritage to reflect its research and public program functions. Rinzler worked at the center until his death in 1994.

== Production ==
=== Festival ===
Since 1967 the Smithsonian Folklife Festival has taken place at the National Mall and featured ongoing performances and demonstrations of contemporary cultural traditions. It has become a national and international model of a research-based presentation of intangible cultural heritage. Year after year, it continues to bring musicians, artists, performers, craftspeople, workers, cooks, and storytellers into this public forum to demonstrate the skills, knowledge, and aesthetics that embody the creative vitality of community-based traditions.

=== Smithsonian Folkways ===
The Smithsonian Folkways Recordings has as its stated mission to curate and provide public access to each item in their collection of folk music, spoken word, instruction, and sounds from around the world. The record label originated as the Folkways Records of Moe Asch, which were donated to the Smithsonian in 1989 under the unique condition that all records in the collection remain available "forever", regardless of sales. Since then, the label has expanded on Asch's vision of documenting and preserving music and soundscapes from around the world. It now includes an extensive collection of traditional American music, children's music, and international music. (Note: For a list of individual collections included under the umbrella of Smithsonian Folkways, see "Folkways Records Labels".) As such, Smithsonian Folkways has become an important collection to the musical community to access and research these recordings from all over the world.

=== Archives ===
The Archives' holdings were seeded by the business records of the Folkways Record label, which were acquired by the CFCH in 1987, and contain the business files of Lead Belly, Pete Seeger, and Woody Guthrie among others. The archive continues to grow in tandem with both the annual Folklife Festival, and the Folkways record label; it serves as the documentation and research foundation for the activities of these other two units of the CFCH. As with all archives, the Folklife Archives is currently working to move its entire collection into digital format, thus enabling global access to the artifacts. This includes not only the artifacts which are born-digital but also older analog forms which require reformatting for the digital world.

== Research ==
In alignment with the mission of the Smithsonian Institution, the Center for Folklife & Cultural Heritage is actively promoting and supporting research in fields under its purview. Currently there are three main research areas actively sponsored by CFCH.

=== Cultural sustainability ===
Introduced as a concept in the Brundtland Report published in 1987, sustainable development was originally defined as encompassing three domains: environmental, economic, and social. It posited that these components must work in concert with each other to insure that current development does not impede development in the future. In 2010, a fourth component was added to this model: culture. This component, previously tucked in with social sustainability, was now to considered in its own right. By acknowledging culture to be independent and separate from the social development of individuals, it recognizes the power and role of cultural structures and forms to give shape and meaning to a social group.

This is the moment when the CFCH took notice. An active research group was formed to explore and articulate this concept of cultural sustainability. How is this defined, and how is it measured? Their goal is to explore means and indicators for assessing the impacts of culture on sustainable development, to develop best practices for bringing culture into political and social policy, and to share their findings with individuals, communities and policymakers around the world. (Note: For specifics on research questions for this group, see "CFCH Cultural Sustainability Research".)

In the practical implementation of cultural sustainability, CFCH also manages three different projects where the theoretical finding of this research can be put to test in the field. The "My Armenia". project is a collaboration between the people of Armenia, the Smithsonian, and USAID. In their "Artisan Initiative"., CFCH is dedicated to building the sustainability of craft traditions of individuals and groups. A third team involved in the more theoretical work on "cultural policy". works with UNESCO, ministries of culture around the world, as well as local, national, and international governments to recommend and develop policy concepts and language on cultural sustainability.

=== Sustaining Minority Languages in Europe (SMiLE) ===
Working in collaboration with the Smithsonian initiative "Recovering Voices"., this interdisciplinary research program explores relationships between language revitalization, cultural heritage, and traditional cultural transmission. How much of the culture of a region is embodied in the actual vocabulary of its language? What unique knowledge is lost when a language has lost its last native speaker? These are some of the issues investigated in this research area, which focuses specifically on the indigenous or minoritized languages of Europe. The charge for this inquiry was set forth in 1992 with passage of the European Charter for Regional or Minority Languages, which mandates protection and promotion of historical regional and minority languages in Europe. Spotlighting these questions also brings into sharp relief the shadow side of minority language communities, which are characteristically marked by poverty, isolation, segregation, travel restrictions, and censorship.

=== Intangible Cultural Heritage ===
Along with the artifacts of material culture, the Center also offers instances of intangible cultural heritage, including traditions of performance, ritual, music, dance, knowledge, storytelling, and oral transmission. The research group explores cultural issues worldwide. (Note: For a list of events sponsored by this research group, see "Intangible Cultural Heritage Events".) Through these connections with external networks and strategic cultural partners, best practices and challenges emerge to inform the future of cultural heritage policy and practice at the Smithsonian. As one of the "Grand Challenges" of the Smithsonian, CFCH strives to be steward and ambassador of cultural connections.
