= Shanachie Records =

American independent record label

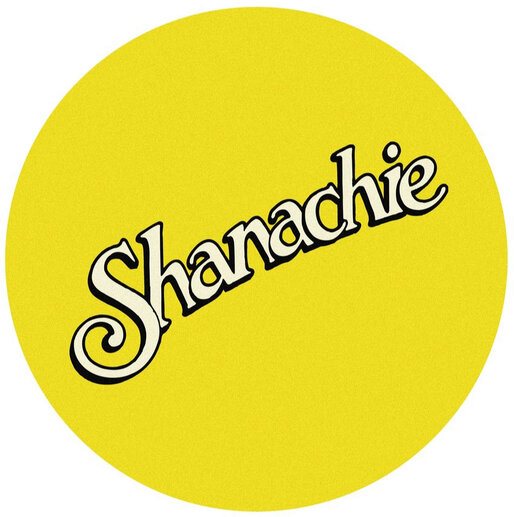
- Parent company: Shanachie Entertainment Corporation
- Founded: 1976
- Founder: Richard Nevins; Dan Collins
- Distributors: AMPED Distribution (US); Virgin Music Group (Digital)
- Genre: Various
- Country of origin: United States
- Location: Newton, New Jersey, U.S.
- Official website: shanachie.com

Shanachie Records is an American, New Jersey–based record label, founded in 1975 by Richard Nevins and Dan Collins. The label is named for the Gaelic word seanchaí (anglicised as shanachie), an Irish storyteller.

It was previously distributed by Entertainment One Distribution.

Starting as a label that specialized in fiddle music, they began releasing work by Celtic groups such as Planxty and Clannad. Other genres on the label include Latin American, African music, soul, country, and ska. In 1989 they acquired Yazoo Records from Nick Perls. This allowed them to release vintage jazz and blues recordings. Today they have another imprint, Shanachie Jazz.

In 1992 Shanachie began releasing CDs by folk singer-songwriters including Richard Shindell, Dolores Keane, John Stewart, Rod MacDonald, Richard Meyer, Karan Casey, Sue Foley, Four Bitchin' Babes, Kevin Gordon, Tommy Makem and Liam Clancy (Makem and Clancy), and others.

In 1980 Shanachie released its first reggae album, King Tubbys Meets Rockers in a Firehouse by Augustus Pablo, and soon after released albums from many reggae artists including Rita Marley, Culture, Bunny Wailer, Judy Mowatt, Alpha Blondy, Lucky Dube, The Skatalites, Israel Vibration, Yellowman, Eek-A-Mouse, John Brown's Body, Gregory Isaacs, Mutabaruka, Third World, Lee "Scratch" Perry, Toots and the Maytals, Freddie McGregor, and others. Shanachie was the U.S. liaison for the UK-based reggae label, Greensleeves Records, until about 1987. Shanachie also released material for Augustus Pablo under the Message imprint of his company, Rockers International. The Grammy Award–winning Soweto Gospel Choir releases albums on Shanachie Records, as has Grammy-nominated Liquid Soul.

The Latin acts on the label include Los Jovenes del Barrio.

== See also ==
- List of record labels
