= Savarino =

Savarino is an Italian surname. Notable people with the surname include:

- Jefferson Savarino (born 1996), Venezuelan footballer
- Jim Savarino (born 1954), American musician and singer-songwriter
