= Matteo Belfiore =

Italian architect

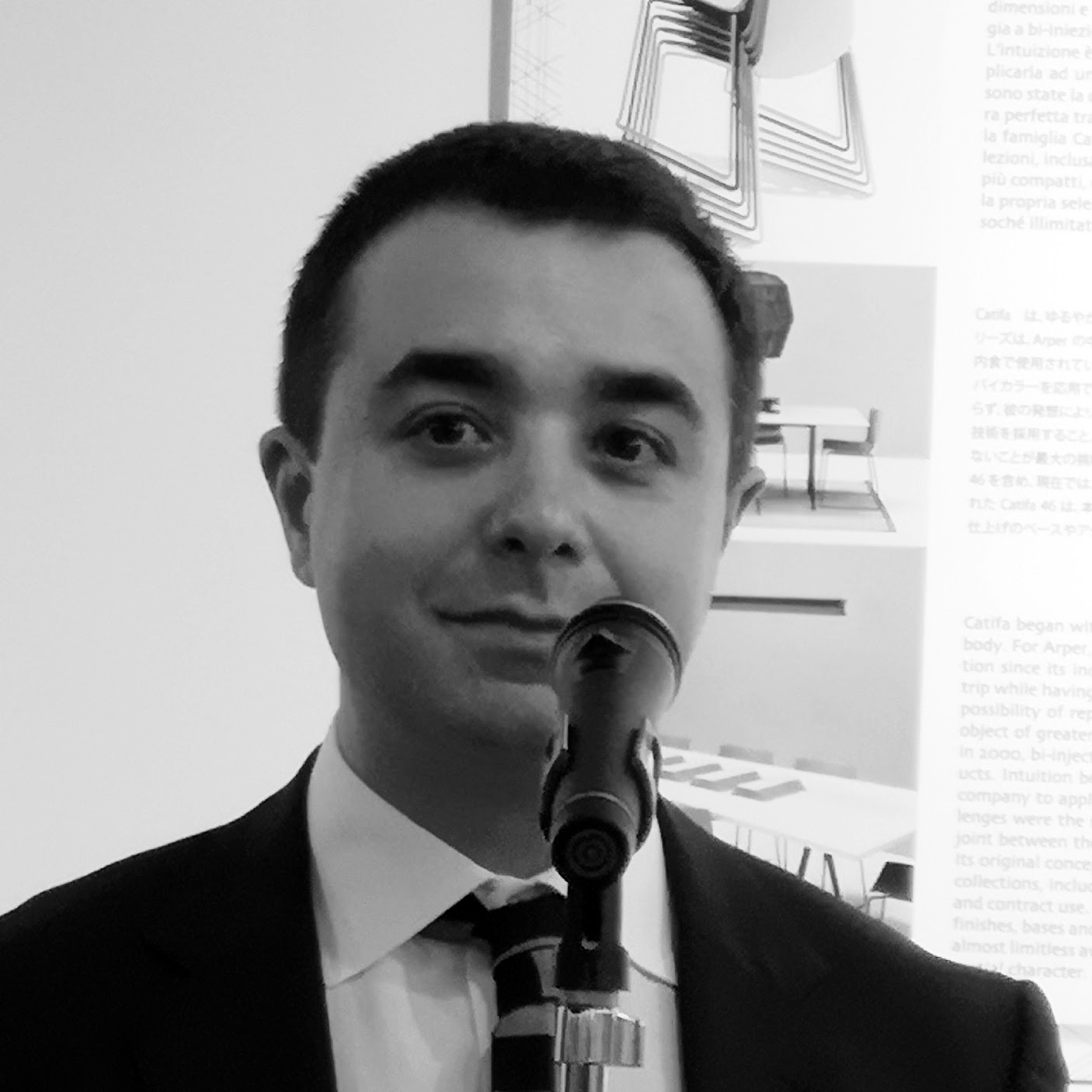
- Born: 27 July 1979 (age 47); Naples, Italy
- Occupation: Architect
- Practice: MB-AA Matteo Belfiore Architect and Associates

Matteo Belfiore (born 27 July 1979) is an Italian architect, principal of the international design practice MB-AA Matteo Belfiore Architect and Associates, based in Tokyo, Japan.

== Early career ==
Matteo Belfiore, born in Naples in 1979, began his architectural education at the University of Naples Federico II. Having graduated with distinction in 2005, he continued his studies at the same institution, eventually attaining a Ph.D. in Architectural and Urban Design in 2010.

In his pursuit of a deeper understanding of urban design principles, Belfiore embarked on a journey to Japan in 2010, assuming the role of a researcher at the Kengo Kuma Lab within the University of Tokyo. This experience proved profoundly enriching, under the tutelage of Kengo Kuma, a great master of contemporary architecture renowned for blending traditional Japanese spaces and aesthetics with the rigor of modernist approaches. This period proved in fact instrumental in shaping Belfiore's architectural philosophy. The culmination of their collaboration materialized in the form of a seminal book titled Patterns and Layering: Japanese Spatial Culture, Nature, and Architecture, which focuses on the dialectic between architectural patterns and layering. Subsequently, the insights of Kengo Kuma himself, as conveyed in the foreword of the publication:

When I learned that Salvator Liotta and Matteo Belfiore in my laboratory had launched a study on patterns and layering, I had a premonition of something new and unseen in preexisting research on Japan [... Matteo Belfiore] attempted to create a link between patterns and layering. These two previously detached notions can now be integrated into one methodology mediated by structural concepts that, in my opinion, are the key to this link. Structural analysis of the twentieth century struggled to advance beyond the column and beam structural frame. Analysis today allows us to conceive stable structures through the accumulation of delicate members, which have the capacity to produce a variety of patterns while fulfilling their structural responsibilities.

— Kengo Kuma

Fueled by his accumulated expertise, Belfiore has nurtured his critical engagement over the years, often engaging in collaborations with international publications within the field, such as Domus, Area, Compasses and ADF Magazine. From the beginning, his critical engagement has always been closely aligned with a sincere focus on design practice. Opting to establish himself in Japan, Belfiore secured design positions at renowned Japanese international studios, including Nikken Sekkei (2013–2014) and Richard Bliah Associates (2014–2017). In recognition of his architectural accomplishments, he was designated as a Testimonial of Italian Design in Tokyo for the Italian Design Day 2022, an international event with internationally showcasing the excellence of Italian design abroad, coordinated by entities including the Italian Ministry of Foreign Affairs, ADI, and the Triennale of Milan among others.

== MB-AA Matteo Belfiore Architect and Associates ==
Drawing upon his accumulated expertise, Belfiore established his independent architectural practice in 2017, under the banner of MB-AA Matteo Belfiore Architect and Associates. His background, combining extensive professional experience with a robust academic scholarship, has led to the development of an inventive design methodology. Central to his approach is the advocacy for "cultural sustainability", which entails a deep respect for the cultural and architectural heritage of the project site. This perspective, akin to an anthropological study, seeks to enhance the intrinsic value system rooted in local natural and cultural contexts. Notably, Belfiore's work often engages in dialogue with Japanese architectural traditions, exemplified by the reinterpretation of elements like ranma, shoji or byobu in contemporary projects such as the new MSC Cruises headquarters, Piaggio Group Japan Headquarters, Shinkin Bank, i-Byobu and others. Furthermore, Belfiore's design philosophy underscores innovation, flexibility, and adaptability, promoting the repurposing and revitalization of architectural spaces.

Belfiore's architectural projects in Japan have earned international recognition. Notable among these is the Casa del Design Italiano at the Embassy of Tokyo (2024). This institution represents the first instance worldwide of a Made in Italy museum housed within an Italian Embassy. The project, developed by Belfiore with the collaboration of the architect Valentina Cannava, focused on the reconfiguration of existing spaces to accommodate multifunctional needs, such as events, meetings, and public reception, and including several Italian designer furnishings, showcasing Italian design expertise. The displayed objects, among which are several recipients of the Compasso d'Oro award, serve as iconic exemplars of Italian industrial design.

Other significant projects are Shinkin Central Bank Innovation Hub, emphasizing modularity and flexibility in its design philosophy; the renovation and re-functionalization of the Italian Cultural Institute Tokyo Library by Gae Aulenti, where the fusion between Italian and Japanese cultures generates several functional zones tailored for diverse needs and harmonized through color symbolism; and Cybernet Japan Headquarters, featuring a minimalist design inspired by Japanese dry gardens that integrates flexible and sustainable spaces. Additionally, there are the Piaggio Group Japan Headquarters, the Perfetti Van Melle Japan Headquarters, the MSC Cruises Japan Headquarters Intesa Sanpaolo and Pirelli Japan Headquarters, and the façade restyling of Marposs Japan Headquarters.

Finally, Belfiore has made further contributions by creating installations for exhibitions with the support of the Italian Ministry of Foreign Affairs. These exhibitions include Italia RicicliAMO, which highlights sustainability, circular economy in architecture and the utilization of 'waste' materials in conceiving purposeful design objects, and The Italian Design Archipelago, focusing on the creative and productive processes of Italian design products. As a result of his work on behalf of Italian institutions and his design accomplishments, Belfiore was lastly honored in 2022 with the Order of the Star of Italy.

== Bibliography ==
- Belfiore, Matteo (2012). Japanese Spatial Culture, Nature and Architecture. gestalten. ISBN 978-3-89955-461-8.
- Belfiore, Matteo (2010). Quarantadue domande a Wiel Arets. Clean. p. 64. ISBN 978-88-8497-115-9.
- Belfiore, Matteo (2010). Ventisette domande a Tadao Ando. Clean. p. 64. ISBN 978-88-8497-121-0.
- Belfiore, Matteo (2010). Trentasette domande a Toyo Ito. Clean. p. 64. ISBN 978-88-8497-120-3.
