= Delicious Peace: Coffee, Music & Interfaith Harmony in Uganda =

Compilation album by Peace Kawomera (Delicious Peace) Fair Trade Cooperative
- Released: April 9, 2013
- Genre: African music
- Label: Smithsonian Folkways Recordings
- Producer: Jeffrey A. Summit

Delicious Peace: Coffee, Music & Interfaith Harmony in Uganda is the second album of Ugandan music compiled by ethnomusicologist Jeffrey Summit and produced by Smithsonian Folkways. The album features music from the interfaith Mirembe Kawomera coffee cooperative in Mbale, Uganda. According to Smithsonian Folkways, the album "aims to overcome religious conflict and bring peace through song and fair trade coffee."

== Musical style ==
Delicious Peace: Coffee, Music & Interfaith Harmony in Uganda was recorded in various Ugandan locales from muddy coffee fields to local synagogues by GRAMMY-nominated Tufts University professor and Rabbi Jeffrey A. Summit .

The coffee farmers of Peace Kawomera sing in a wide range of musical styles, a result of their diverse backgrounds. According to Summit's liner notes, "Protestants, Catholics, Jews, and Muslims have distinctive styles of religious music. However, the coffee songs are sung in the musical styles of the five language/ethnic groups who form the cooperative— Bagisu, Bagwere, Banyole, Basoga, and Baganda." The album features songs in all five languages. Occasionally, cooperative members will also sing in Swahili, Arabic, Hebrew, and English.

The album features a variety of musical talents, including village guitar groups and women's choirs. They are accompanied by traditional instruments, such as embaire (xylophone with wooden keys), ngoma (drum), akadongo (lamellaphone, often referred to as a thumb piano), endingidi (one-string fiddle), and nsasi (shaker).

== Purpose of the album ==
In his liner notes, Summit explains that "In Uganda, when villagers have important information to share or lessons to teach, they turn to music." The songs in Delicious Peace: Coffee, Music & Interfaith Harmony in Uganda cover a variety of themes, including how and why to grow coffee, fair trade, interfaith cooperation, and peace. Mirembe Kawomera also uses music to encourage people to join the cooperative.

Royalties from the sale of this recording support education for the children of the Peace Kawomera cooperative. Summit previously produced the 2005 GRAMMY nominated album Abayudaya: Music from the Jewish People of Uganda, the royalties of which supported the college education of 31 students.

== Track listing ==
1. The benefits of coffee Akuseka Takuwa Kongo Group (4:23)
2. The people of Uganda Balitwegomba Choir (4:07)
3. Get up and grow coffee! J.J. Keki and the Peace Kawomera Band (3:34)
4. Hit the jerrycan! Integrated Rural Development Support Programs Choir (5:26)
5. In Uganda, everyone grows coffee Mbiko Aisa Farmers Group (4:18)
6. Let us continue farming Kasimu Namanyala and Paul Mugoya (5:26)
7. Construct a processing factory Gumutindo Quality Choir (1:49)
8. My beautiful wife, come back and we’ll grow coffee Peace Kawomera Jazz Band (5:13)
9. Poverty is an obstacle to a good marriage Masanda Group (2:22)
10. Let all religions come together Akuseka Takuwa Congo Group (5:12)
11. Salaam alaikum Balitwegomba Choir (3:26)
12. In Nangolo, we are all fired up J.J. Keki and Peace Kawomera Jazz Band (3:55)
13. If you are stuck in tradition, change will not wait for you Gumutindo Women’s Group (2:00)
14. The Bagisu people have brought vanilla and coffee Matale Mirembe Vanilla Group (2:27)
15. Educate our children Balitwegomba Choir (4:10)
16. We have improved our economic status Mbiko Aisa Farmers Group (4:29)
