= Christian Bauman =

American novelist

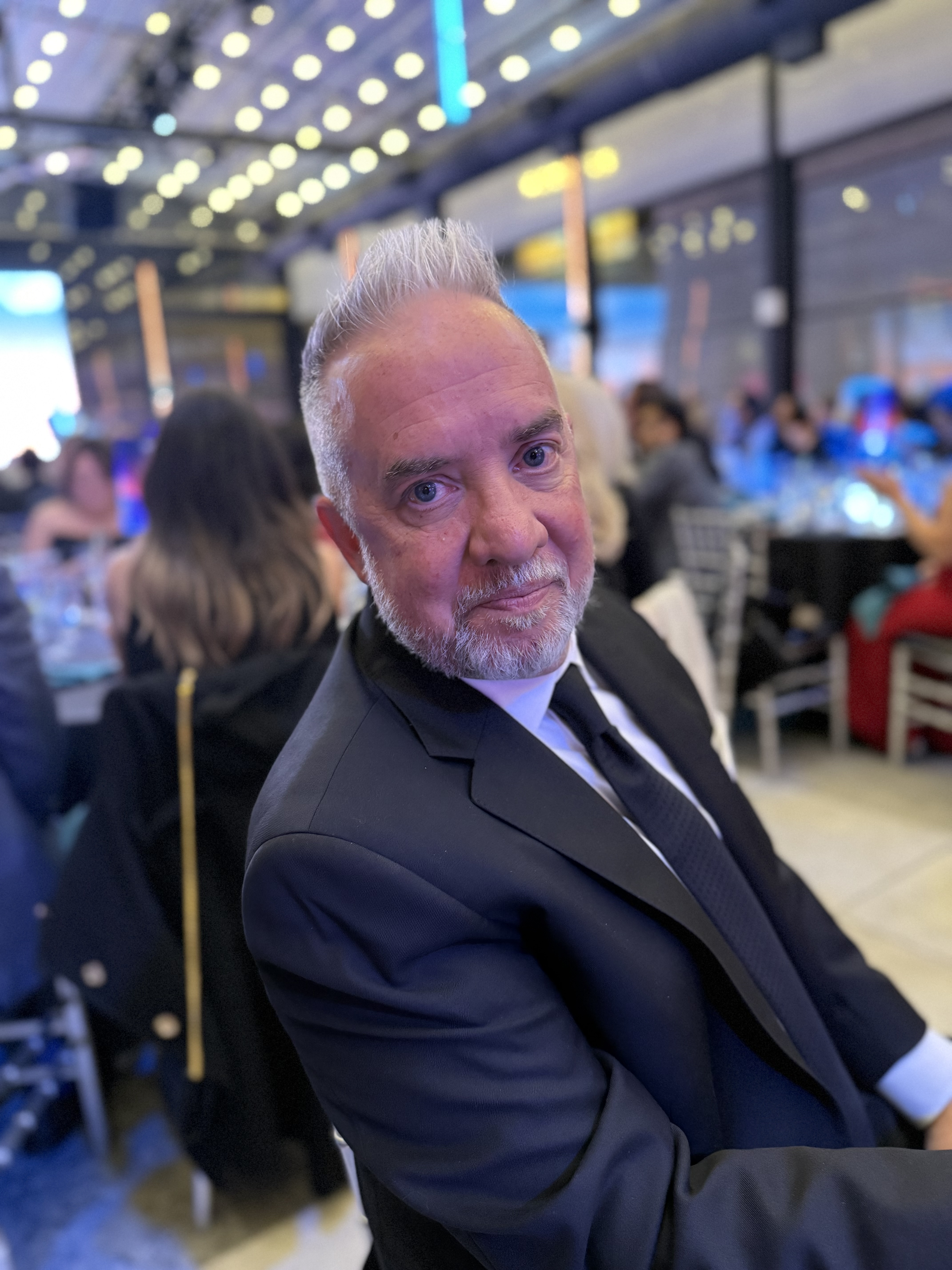
- Bauman in 2026
- Born: June 15, 1970 (age 56); Easton, Pennsylvania, U.S.
- Education: North Hunterdon High School
- Occupation: Novelist
- Children: 2
- Writing career
- Period: 21st century
- Genres: Novels and essays
- Notable works: The Ice Beneath You, Voodoo Lounge, In Hoboken

Christian Bauman (born June 15, 1970) is an American novelist and musician. He lives in New Hope, Pennsylvania.

== Early life and education ==
Bauman was born in Easton, Pennsylvania, on June 15, 1970. He grew up in Doylestown, Pennsylvania and Quakertown, New Jersey.

Bauman's family traveled extensively in North America and Europe when he was a child, and spent a year in India, Nepal, and Sri Lanka 1983-1984, when he would have been in 8th grade. He was raised by his stepfather, a philosophy professor, and his mother, a physician. His biological father was only an occasional presence in his life and served time in maximum security prison when Bauman was a child. In a 2003 interview with Terry Gross on NPR's Fresh Air, Bauman said his childhood was not a particularly happy one.

He graduated from North Hunterdon High School in Clinton Township, New Jersey, in 1988, and did not attend college.

== Career ==
=== U.S. Army ===
In 1991, at age 21, Bauman enlisted for four years in the U.S. Army Waterborne, the army's small boat field. He deployed to Somalia1992-1993 as part of the 1098th Medium Boat Co. In 1994, he was deployed to Haiti on the USAV Besson (LSV-1). In both cases, Bauman was among the first American troops in the deployment: in the opening weeks of the Somalia mission, and within the first hour of the Haiti occupation.

=== Musician ===
Bauman wrote both songs and short stories during the 1990s, recording two solo albums, as well as work as a member of Camp Hoboken. Four of his songs are in the Smithsonian's Folkways Collection of New York's Fast Folk recordings (including "Kismaayo", written in Mogadishu and mailed back to Jack Hardy, who then performed it at The Bottom Line).

Following his honorable discharge in 1995, Bauman spent the next few years writing and playing guitar on the North American folk circuit, both alone and as part of Camp Hoboken, which included folksingers Gregg Cagno and Linda Sharar. Bauman performed with or opened for artists including Pete Seeger, Jack Hardy, John Gorka, Odetta, Cheryl Wheeler, and Livingston Taylor, playing at Godfrey Daniels, Passim, Eddie's Attic, The Iron Horse, and other acoustic venues.

=== Novelist ===
==== The Ice Beneath You ====
In 2002, Bauman published his first novel, The Ice Beneath You, about the return of a young American soldier from Somalia, and the traumatic aftermath of his deployment as he submerges into the seedy underside of gritty 1990s West Coast America. A few small sections of The Ice Beneath You were written in Somalia during Bauman's time there, but the majority was written between 1999 and 2000. The novel was purchased by Simon & Schuster in 2001, and published in 2002. In his book, What Every Person Should Know About War, journalist Chris Hedges called The Ice Beneath You "one of the finest books about life in the American army."

==== Voodoo Lounge ====
In 2005, National Book Award-winning writer Robert Stone wrote of Bauman's novel Voodoo Lounge, "The prose in Voodoo Lounge reverberates in the white space around it." The novel is about love, addiction, and betrayal in a small group of American soldiers, and centers on a female soldier hiding her HIV status during the 1994 occupation of Haiti and a Haitian-American US Army officer struggling with issues of race and loyalty. Bauman's first two novels are among the very small group of war-based literary fiction produced by a Generation X author.

==== In Hoboken ====
Bauman's third novel, In Hoboken, published in 2008, is about a group of young musicians in the unplugged/acoustic-rock and folk scene of the mid-1990s, and the mental health facility where one of them works. Critic Paul Constant, reviewing In Hoboken, wrote, "Bauman is an incredible writer. This is one of those books -- like Lethem when he's cooking, or Chabon at his most vibrant -- when every line snaps and propels you forward." Critic Betsy Willeford wrote in the Star-Ledger: “Remarkably, Bauman has created nearly a dozen fully rounded characters, each of whom could be the core of a novel. Even Bauman’s throwaway lines resonate; he’s wise enough to let the echo do the work. What’s amazing about In Hoboken is you’re unaware of the writer’s hand.”

=== All Things Considered commentaries ===
Between 2003 and 2006, Bauman's short essays appeared regularly on NPR's All Things Considered. The nine autobiographical commentaries included pieces about being a soldier in Mogadishu in 1992-1993, his origins as a writer, becoming a young father (his first daughter was born when Bauman was 17), and his time as a touring musician in the 1990s.

== Personal life ==
Bauman has been president or chief creative officer of three advertising agencies in New York City. In June 2026 he announced news of his first publication since 2008, a novel titled Kosha to be released by Blackstone Publishing in 2027. He has two daughters: Kristina born in 1988 and Fiona born in 1999. He has written about his difficult road to sobriety and the impact of addiction on his writing.

== Novels ==
- Kosha (Blackstone Publishing, coming 2027).
- In Hoboken (Melville House Publishing, 2008). ISBN 978-1933633473
- Voodoo Lounge (Simon & Schuster/Touchstone, 2005). ISBN 978-0743270984
- The Ice Beneath You (Simon & Schuster/Scribner, 2002). ISBN 978-1439104552

== In anthologies ==
- War Is... (young adult) (Candlewick, 2008); essay titled "Letter to a Young Enlistee"
- Living on the Edge of the World: New Jersey Writers Take On the Garden State (Touchstone, 2007); essay titled "The Commute (Hoboken 1996)"
- Not Like I'm Jealous or Anything: The Jealousy Book (young adult) (Delacorte, 2006); short story written with daughter Kristina Bauman titled "Everyone's Green About Something"
- Bookmark Now: Writing in Unreaderly Times (Basic Books, 2005); essay titled "Not Fade Away"
- Bauman contributed to What Every Person Should Know About War by Chris Hedges (Free Press, 2003)

== Notable nonfiction on the web ==
- The End (2021, Line Literary Review, Columbia University).
- Gabe Hudson & the Lost Soldiers of Generation X (2023, IdentityTheory.com).
- Living With Music: Christian Bauman (2009, New York Times).
- Our Father (2009, IdentityTheory.com).
- Not Fade Away (2004, IdentityTheory.com).
- The Road to Yountville (2004, IdentityTheory.com).

== Discography ==
- Out Here in the Perimeter (1993, self-released).
- Road Dogs, Assassins, & the Queen of Ohio (1996, Black Potatoe Records).
