= Rod MacDonald =

American songwriter

- Rod MacDonald, Bull Run Concert Series, Shirley MA. June 7, 2008

Background information
- Born: Roderick Owen MacDonald; August 17, 1948 (age 78); Southington, Connecticut, United States
- Origin: Greenwich Village, New York City
- Genres: Folk, folk rock
- Occupations: singer, songwriter
- Instruments: vocals, guitar, piano, harmonica
- Years active: 1973–current
- Website: www.rodmacdonald.com

Rod MacDonald (born August 17, 1948) is an American singer-songwriter, novelist, and educator. He was a "big part of the 1980s folk revival in Greenwich Village clubs", performing at the Speakeasy, The Bottom Line, Folk City, and the "Songwriter's Exchange" at the Cornelia Street Cafe. He co-founded the Greenwich Village Folk Festival, now a non-profit, and is still the President and co-producer of its events.

He is perhaps best known for his songs "American Jerusalem", about the "contrast between the rich and the poor in Manhattan" (Sing Out!), "A Sailor's Prayer", "Coming of the Snow", "Every Living Thing", and "My Neighbors in Delray", a description of the September 11 hijackers' last days in Delray Beach, Florida, where MacDonald has lived since 1995. His songs have been covered by Dave Van Ronk, Shawn Colvin, Four Bitchin' Babes, Jonathan Edwards, Garnet Rogers, Joe Jencks, and others. His 1985 recording "White Buffalo" is dedicated to Lakota Sioux ceremonial chief and healer Frank Fools Crow, whom he visited in 1981 and 1985, and who appears with MacDonald in the cover photograph. Since 1995, MacDonald has lived in south Florida, where his cd, "Later that Night" was named "Best Local Cd of 2014" by The Palm Beach Post and reached the top ten in national roots music charts. In south Florida, he's been named one of "Ten Greatest South Florida Folk Singers Of All Time" by Broward Palm Beach New Times.

His first novel, The Open Mike, about a young man in the open mike scene of Greenwich Village, was published on December 5, 2014, by Archway Publishing. On December 10, 2020, MacDonald released his 13th solo recording, Boulevard, on Blue Flute Music. On April 14, 2021, his second novel, The American Guerillas, was published by Archway Publications. On June 1, 2023, MacDonald's 14th solo album, Rants And Romance, a collection of 14 new songs and 3 by other songwriters, was released by Blue Flute Music, charting in the top ten on national folk music charts during the summer. On December 15, 2025, MacDonald published his third novel, Election Night, with Kirkus Reviews noting ""MacDonald is a talented and perceptive writer, especially during the assassination subplot, which combines suspense with shrewd psychological nuance and punchy, evocative prose."

== Early life ==
MacDonald was born August 17, 1948, in Southington, Connecticut, to Harold Owen MacDonald (born March 12, 1909, in Sherbrooke, NS) and Blanche Joan Woish (born April 7, 1919, in Boston, MA). He began his musical education as a slide trombonist at 11, switching to guitar in his mid-teens as he learned the popular 1960s folk songs.

After graduating from the Cheshire Academy in 1966, he attended the University of Virginia, where he was managing editor of the student newspaper The Cavalier Daily and toured statewide with the five-piece folk group The Lovin' Sound. Graduating in 1970 with honors in history, he attended Columbia Law School and joined the Judge Advocate General's Corps, U.S. Navy.

He worked summers as a reporter for the Hartford Courant in 1969 and Newsweek in Atlanta (1970) and Washington, DC (1971), for whom he covered the Pentagon Papers trial. In 1972, while at Officer's Training School in Newport, RI, he began working as a solo singer-guitarist at a waterfront bar, The Black Pearl, on a nightly basis. He was honorably discharged as a conscientious objector in August 1972. He graduated law school in 1973 but did not take the bar exam, instead beginning his professional career in music in New York City.

== Recordings & tours ==
MacDonald's first recordings in 1980--"Song of My Brothers" and "The Coming of The Snow"—were included on the Stash Records compilation Cornelia Street: The Songwriters Exchange, named "Best of the Month" by Stereo Review. His first solo album, No Commercial Traffic, was released by Cinemagic Records in 1983; it includes some of his best-known songs, including "American Jerusalem," "Every Living Thing" and "A Sailor's Prayer," which has been recorded by several dozen sea shanty, Renaissance fair and chorale groups. In all, he has released 14 solo recordings on the Cinemagic, Mountain Railroad, Shanachie, Gadfly, Wind River and Blue Flute labels in the US, 9 in Europe (1 on the German label Autogram, 8 on the Swiss label Brambus,) and 21 songs now in the Smithsonian Folkways collection through the (Fast Folk Musical Magazine). He has also recorded 3 cds as lead singer of Big Brass Bed, a Palm Beach County rock and roll band, and appears on numerous compilations of Florida and folk artists. His current label is Blue Flute Music, which also controls most of his publishing.

MacDonald has appeared on stage with many artists, including Pete Seeger, Peter Yarrow, Odetta, Tom Paxton, the Violent Femmes, Suzanne Vega, Shawn Colvin, Dave Van Ronk, Emmylou Harris, Richie Havens, Ani DiFranco, Tom Chapin, Jack Hardy, David Massengill, Joe Jencks and many others. MacDonald was a regular contributor to the Fast Folk Musical Magazine, publishing 21 songs and interviewing other artists, and appeared in its annual concerts. He has performed at major festivals in Philadelphia, Winnipeg, Florida, South Florida, Riverhawk, Boston, Kerrville, Greenwich Village, Falcon Ridge, New Bedford Summerfest, Port Fairy (Australia), Friuli (Italy), Edinburgh Fringe and Trowbridge (UK), and on the radio program Mountain Stage. He was reportedly the first American singer to tour the newly independent Czech Republic in 1991, and has made 50 tours in Europe since 1985, nearly all of them with NYC bassist Mark Dann. He completed a RT tour of the US in summer 2024, and as of March 2026 has announced dates in Florida and the northeast US in spring and summer.

In May 2011, Brambus Records and Blue Flute Music released Songs Of Freedom, a collection of 16 previously unreleased songs, in Switzerland and the US; Blue Flute also released Big Brass Bed's Dylan Jam + 2, a new set of 9 Bob Dylan compositions and two originals. In May 2014 Blue Flue Music released the solo cd Later That Night, as well as Big Tent, a new cd by Big Brass Bed. Later That Night was named "Best Local Cd of 2014" by The Palm Beach Post and reached the top ten in national roots and folk music charts. In 2017 Blue Flute Music released Rod MacDonald & Mark Dann: Live At Music-Star, a concert DVD recorded in Norderstedt, Germany in April 2016. On May 1, 2018, Blue Flute Music released Beginning Again, MacDonald's 12th solo recording. His 13th, Boulevard, was released December 10, 2020; in March 2021, Boulevard was #11 on the Folk Alliance national folk music chart.

On June 1, 2023, Blue Flute Music released Rants And Romance, his 14th solo recording; the 17-song collection charted at #5 on the Folk Alliance national folk music chart in summer 2023. Writing in Goldmine, Lee Zimmerman called it "flush with astute observations and commentary on the current stage of politics and populism at a time when courtesy and common sense seem to have gone wholly astray. The material is pointed and prophetic, with melodies that ring, resonate and make emphatic impressions."

== Recent work ==
After two decades in Greenwich Village, MacDonald moved to south Florida in 1995, where he often performs as a solo guitarist-singer. He is also lead singer of the Dylan cover band Big Brass Bed, named "Best Folk Band" in 2016 by the New Times Broward-Palm Beach, and performs with the Humdingers, with Irish singer Tracy Sands, and with songwriter George Goehring's show "My Life in the Brill Building". The Palm Beach Post has called him one of the "Ten Magnificent Musicians of Palm Beach County". In June 2013 Broward Palm Beach New Times named him #6 of "Ten Greatest South Florida Folksingers Of All Time.". Since 2006 he is also an instructor for the Florida Atlantic University (Lifelong Learning Center), hosting the lecture and performance series "Music Americana", where he was awarded the Distinguished Faculty Award in 2012.

== Style ==
A tenor with a clear voice and wide range, MacDonald is often cited for both his musicality and the content of his songs about political and social events: "Rod MacDonald is a brilliant folk singer and composer. His melodic songs possess words that go straight into your heart and soul." The Press Of Atlantic City ... "A poet with a lot on his mind who has never allowed himself to make points at the expense of making music." The Boston Globe ... "True to the folk tradition, MacDonald is not afraid to get political, take chances, and perhaps shock some people....MacDonald's place in the folk hall of fame is assured by his 'A Sailor's Prayer,' a hymn-styled tune that many people have mistaken for a traditional song." All-Music Guide.

Although usually labeled a folk singer, his musical styles include rock, pop, country, light jazz, and blues. In addition to his work in Greenwich Village and Florida, he has written extensively of experiences on US Indian reservations and in Europe, living in Italy from 1989 to 1992.

== Personal life ==
MacDonald lives in Delray Beach, Florida, with wife Nicole (Hitz) MacDonald, of Chur, Switzerland, and children Elliot and Alena. During the 2020-21 pandemic and shutdown, he performed a ninety-minute concert each Sunday evening on Facebook, restarted the Greenwich Village Folk Festival as a monthly online series, and released Boulevard, a cd of "my first songs, the first original words and music I wrote and sang for friends, on the street, and in clubs and coffeehouses. Nearly all were never recorded, until 2020." He also continued his lecture series Music Americana at Florida Atlantic University's Osher/Lifelong Learning program, and has since released Rants And Romance and resumed live performing.

== Discography ==
=== Albums ===
- No Commercial Traffic (1983)
- White Buffalo (1985)
- Bring on the Lions (1989)
- Highway to Nowhere (1992)
- Man on the Ledge (1994)
- And Then He Woke Up (1996)
- Into the Blue (1999)
- Recognition (2002)
- Big Brass Bed: A Few Dylan Songs (2003) (band album of Bob Dylan covers)
- A Tale of Two Americas (2005)
- After The War (2009)
- Songs Of Freedom (2011)
- Big Brass Bed: Dylan Jam + 2 (2011) (band album of 9 Bob Dylan covers plus 2 originals)
- Later That Night (2014)
- Big Brass Bed: Big Tent (2014)
- Beginning Again (2018)
- Boulevard (2020)
- Rants And Romance (2023)

=== DVDs ===
- Rod MacDonald & Mark Dann: Live At Music-Star (2017)
