= Frank Schildt =

- Born: January 15, 1916; The Hague, Netherlands
- Died: January 15, 1988 (aged 72)
- Instrument: Guitar

Frank Schildt (born January 15, 1916, in The Hague, Netherlands) was a self-taught singer-musician. He learned to play guitar after high school, playing for friends and acquaintances at places such as youth hostels. He did not play professionally until after World War II. At first he played to entertain troops. He was paid with food and cigarettes as money had no real value immediately after the war. In 1946 he and a friend went on the road, playing in bars, nightclubs, hotels, and restaurants throughout Europe. In December 1949 he settled in Paris, France where he played regularly at a club called Milord l'Arsouille. In 1955 he became the Artistic Director of a cave-style club on the Left Bank called The Tabou. It was the first existentialist cave and attracted many foreigners. There he met representatives of the University of Wisconsin, which led him to sign a contract for a United States tour, which began in September 1958. He toured many schools across the country, and afterwards took a booking at the Gate of Horn folk music club in Chicago.

After his engagement in Chicago ended, Schildt went to New York City where he performed in Mirco's Restaurant, Gerde's Folk City, and other venues. While in New York he met Sylvia Siegel, whom he later married. He continued to live in the United States, performing in venues across the country. His first and only album, Songs of Love, Play and Protest, was recorded by Folkways Records in 1960. This album is now part of the Smithsonian Folkways collection.

Frank Schildt died from a heart attack on January 15, 1988.
