= Mirembe Kawomera =

Mirembe Kawomera (also known as Peace Kawomera, or "Delicious Peace") is an interfaith Fair trade coffee cooperative in Mbale, Uganda. The cooperative is made up of Jewish, Christian, and Muslim farmers. Founded in 2003 by JJ Keki, the members of Mirembe Kawomera use music and fair trade coffee to promote peace between religions.

== History ==
Jewish Ugandan coffee farmer and musician J.J. Keki founded Peace Kawomera after witnessing the attacks of September 11, 2001 firsthand during a trip to New York City. Deeply moved, he felt compelled to bring different religions together in peace. When Keki returned to Uganda, he walked from village to village, enlisting Jewish, Christian, and Muslim farmers to join his Fair Trade cooperative. Today, over 1,000 farmers have joined Peace Kawomera. He got help marketing their coffee from the organization Kulanu (All of Us ). Laura Wetzler, a volunteer, called a long list of coffee roasters, in alphabetical order, until she got to the Fair Trade company, Thanksgiving Coffee. CEO Paul Katzeff at Thanksgiving Coffee says (according to an article on Green America's website): “For me the story was inspiring...People of faith finding hope through coffee. Choosing cooperation in a world torn up by intolerance. I said, ‘OK, I'll buy it.’”

This alliance of Muslims, Jews, and Christians in Uganda with Kulanu and Thanksgiving Coffee in the United States has had two major benefits for the Ugandan farmers, as described in YES magazine: "By banding together and by establishing a fair trade relationship, the farmers now realize enough profits from sales to meet their families' basic need?s [sic]—a sharp contrast to the hardship of trying to sell as individuals to large corporate buyers in a glutted world market. Better circumstances have, in turn, sweetened relations between the unique Mbale Jewish community and their more numerous Muslim and Christian neighbors." It has also gotten the attention of synagogues across America as well as the media in the US and Israel.

== Products ==
In 2006, the Thanksgiving Coffee Company in Fort Bragg, California, became the sole distributor of Peace Kawomera coffee. They produce dark roast, light roast, and decaf coffee from the cooperative's harvest.

The farmers of Mirembe Kawomera are also musicians, and founder JJ Keki refers to himself as the cooperative's "Music Director." The Smithsonian Folkways album "Delicious Peace: Coffee, Music & Interfaith Harmony in Uganda" features music from members of the cooperative, recorded and compiled by Tufts University Professor and Rabbi Jeffrey Summit. According to Folkways, the album "aims to overcome religious conflict and bring peace through song [and] features uplifting, multilingual songs that teach cooperation through music."
