= Hatun Kotama Flute School =

The Hatun Kotama Flute School is part of a larger cultural center in the community of Kotama in Otavalo, Ecuador. The purpose of the center is to educate others about the world view and cultural expression of the Kotama community. Members of the school practice and teach traditional gaita music. The music is inspired by a deep connection with nature and the sounds that occur in everyday life, primarily utilizing the transverse flute, harmonica, and shells for instrumentation.

== History ==
The school was founded in the early 2000s by Luis Enrique Cachiguango under the name "The Village of Kotama's First Native Indigenous Flute School". Later in August 2008 the school was reinitiated under the name Hatun Kotama Flute School. During the yearly celebration of inti-Raymi, the music plays a prominent role in community rituals and celebrations.

As part of the One World Many Voices program, Hatun Kotama performed at the 2013 Smithsonian Folklife Festival in Washington, D.C. The performance also coincided with their second album ¡Así Kotama! The Flutes of Otavalo Ecuador released on Smithsonian Folkways.

== Discography ==
| Year | Title | Record label |
|---|---|---|
| 2010 | Música Ritual del Hatun Puncha-Inti Raymi | Ministerio de Cultura del Ecuador |
| 2013 | Así Kotama! The Flutes of Otavalo, Ecuador | Smithsonian Folkways Recordings |
