= Tom Intondi =

American singer-songwriter

Tom Intondi was an American singer-songwriter first based in Greenwich Village and later in the Northwest. Intondi recorded three solo albums, and toured and recorded with a collaboration called The Song Project that also included Lucy Kaplansky, Frank Christian, and Martha P. Hogan.

Intondi died of cancer in 1994. Two years later, friend, Frank Rossini compiled a set of recordings from performances (both solo and with other artists) and released a disc titled, Tom Intondi Live!.

== Discography ==
- City Dancer (1976, City Dancer)
- House of Water (1983, City Dancer)
- Bringin' up the Sun (1992, City Dancer)
- Tom Intondi Live! (1996, City Dancer)

=== See also ===
- The Song Project (1985) – a collaboration with Lucy Kaplansky, Frank Christian, and Martha P. Hogan
- Fast Folk Musical Magazine
