= Rafael Manríquez =

Chilean musician (1947–2013)

Rafael Manríquez (March 27, 1947 – June 26, 2013) was a Chilean journalist, singer, guitarist, composer and producer born in Santiago.

== Early life ==
Growing up, Manríquez was surrounded by music. His house was always full with the sounds of his grandfather's guitar playing and singing. Manríquez took up the guitar at age fifteen to perform songs of neighboring Argentina recorded by Los Chalchaleros and other current favorites. He soon joined his brother José Manuel and two other friends in the group Los Machis, named after the Mapuche (Indian) shamans (usually women). While studying in Viña del Mar, a city on Chile's central coast important for contemporary song festivals and competitions, the group competed in the Festival Chile Múltiple, tying for first place with another young group, Quilapayún, which in the following decades became one of the most renowned Chilean nueva canción groups.

After completing two years of journalism studies, Rafael moved to the Chilean capital, Santiago, where he joined Ñancahuazú, a talented trio in the nueva canción vein. Ñancahuazú recorded De Chile a Chile ‘From Chile to Chile’, an album of songs that spoke of the history of Chile, and they toured the southern regions of the country.

== Nueva Cancion and the Neofolklore Movement ==
Manríquez worked as a music journalist during one of the most momentous times in Chilean music history. As a reporter for the music magazine El Musiquero (1970–1973), he interviewed, reviewed, and wrote about key figures such as Víctor Jara, Inti-Illimani, Quilapayún, and Violeta Parra. It was the time of socialist president Salvador Allende, and performances by foreign artists from like-minded movements such as Cuba's Silvio Rodríguez and Pablo Milanés were commonplace at musical events supported by the Allende regime. “All this contact with the Chilean nueva canción and the Latin American thing . . . put me close to the nueva canción and the modern folklore movement,” says Rafael, characterizing aspects of the movement as “neofolklore.” He explains how, beginning in the early 1960s, the “neofolklore movement arose with groups such as Los Cuatro Cuartos, with important songwriters. . . . This is the neofolklore movement that takes it upon itself to save the different rhythms and styles from north to south in Chile. That was the great contribution of that movement, as well as the fact of the enthusiasm of the youth and all the people, their connection to the guitar.” This, in turn, led to “the rise of the nueva canción, with Víctor Jara, with Patricio Manns, with Isabel Parra, and, naturally, with Violeta Parra, the bearer and the mother of the nueva canción.”

Then came the fateful day of 11 September 1973, when the commander-in-chief of the Chilean army, Augusto Pinochet, led a coup d’état, overthrowing Allende and his government. Repression of leftist parties and ideologies followed, with thousands of people tortured and killed. “There was heavy censorship,” Rafael recalls. “My desire was to leave Chile, because I really found myself in a very restrictive situation in regard to free expression. . . . I could not write what I wanted any longer for the magazine. My musical career had stopped right there.. . . I was invited [in 1975] to go to Ecuador to work in restaurants and things like that as a singer.” He soon realized that playing pop songs and the nightlife were not for him, and he moved from Guayaquil to Quito (Ecuador), where he found more creative, cultural development work touring the country and performing traditional music.

== Grupo Raíz ==
Manríquez relocated to Berkeley, California, where he found many sympathetic musicians, some of whom had also suffered persecution and even torture at the hands of the Chilean military. By 1980, he and several others had formed Grupo Raíz, following the model of Chilean nueva canción groups. Grupo Raíz toured Europe and North, Central, and South America, releasing three long-play recordings during their most active period, from 1980 to 1985. Two of these, Amaneceres ‘Dawnings’ (1981) and América del Centro ‘The Center of America’ (1984), were published on Monitor Records, which later became part of the Smithsonian Folkways collections. Subsequently, with the exception of periodic reunion concerts, the members of Grupo Raíz went their own artistic ways.

== Current work ==
Rafael recorded several self-produced solo albums and became a fixture at La Peña Cultural Center in Berkeley, teaching and performing throughout the Bay Area. Since 1990, Rafael has returned regularly to Chile, where he became part of its national folksong movement. Since 1984, Rafael has focused on his career as a solo artist, creating several independently produced CDs and performing throughout California. He is also a founding member of the Andean music group Arauco, which performs throughout Northern California.

== Discography ==
Album title	Description	Year
¡Que viva el Canto! (Smithsonian Folkways Recordings)	25 songs from different times, areas and styles of the Chilean folk music.	2008
"Aquí te traigo una Rosa"	A section of folkloric songs from Latin America, two voices and many folk instruments.	2007
Canto y Soneto: Rafael Manríquez sings Pablo Neruda	Music by Rafael Manríquez on 14 of Pablo Neruda's "100 Sonnets of Love	2007
Alma de Niño	with Ingrid Rubis	2006
Mi Sol de Ayer. A journey of Latin American songs	Lyrics by Rafael Manriquez and Music by Jerry Lee	2003
Grupo Raiz. Anthology 1980-1984		2002
Canto al Poeta	Songs of Rafael Manríquez and David Barrows, set to the poetry of Pablo Neruda	2001
La Travesía	Solo recording	2001
Amistades / Friendships. Music of the Chilean diaspora	with Quique Cruz	2000
Canto a Gabriela	Solo Recording	1995
Colibrí. Latin American Music for the Whole Family	Colibrí Ensemble	1994
Andares	Solo recording	1989
Canciones de Compañeros	with Ruth Schoenbach	1985
De Chile a Chile	Trio Ñancahuazú	1970
