= Jim Savarino =

American musician and singer-songwriter (born 1954)

Jim Savarino (born 1954 in Wheeling, West Virginia) is an American musician and singer-songwriter born in Wheeling, West Virginia, currently living in Oakhurst, California. He is known for writing contemporary songs that draw from his Appalachian roots, nature and the human condition, often with a humorous point of view. His music connects with environmental groups such as the Sierra Club. Jim's song "Where Have The Mountains Gone" (aka "Appalachian Fall") appears in a documentary film regarding the practice of mountaintop removal mining (MTR). Jim's song "Avoca By Night" appears on the 1993 Fast Folk Los Angeles recording. The Fast Folk recordings are now being maintained by Smithsonian Folkways Recordings.

In July, 2020, Jim signed with Silverwolf Records of Westminster, Vermont.

== Discography ==
- The Man in the Street (1997)
- Don't Let The World Get You Down (2001)
- Sun Dreams (2009)
