= Charity Bailey =

American children's music educator born 1904

- Born: 1904; Providence, Rhode Island
- Died: November 13, 1978 (aged 73); New York City
- Occupations: Music educator, children's television host

Charity Alberta Bailey (September 7, 1904 – September 15, 1978) was an African American music educator in New York City and a children's television pioneer who hosted the programs Sing-A-Song (1954–1956) and Here's Charity (late 1960s). In both her classroom and educational programs, Bailey featured songs and instruments from around the world, with particular influence from Creole music and folk music.

Bailey was a teacher at the Little Red School House in Manhattan and the Heathcote School in Scarsdale, New York, as well as other schools. She released children's music recordings throughout her life. In the early 1950s she published the bestselling children's song book Playtime with Music.

== Early life and education ==
Charity Bailey was born in 1904 to a prominent African American family in Providence, Rhode Island. At age 16, she was described as a music prodigy with "sympathetic feeling as an accompanist" by The New York Age. Her sister Amy Bailey was noted as a soprano. In 1927, Bailey graduated with a degree in education from the Rhode Island College. Due to racial discrimination in Providence, she moved to Atlanta to teach at Spelman College Laboratory School, which was associated with the historically Black university.

She later moved to the Harlem neighborhood of New York City, where she taught at a children's music center and later the Henry Street Settlement while simultaneously studying music performance, including guitar, piano, harp, and other instruments. She trained in advanced piano at the Juilliard School of Music, and became the first African American to receive a certificate from the Dalcroze School.

== Teaching career ==
From 1943 to 1954, Bailey taught music at the Little Red School House, a progressive school in Manhattan. At one point, she lived with the family of a seven-year-old student, Faith Holsaert, after the child encouraged her mother to become Bailey's patron. The mother, Eunice Holsaert, reportedly asked the child, "What makes you think Charity Bailey wants to live with us?" to which Faith replied, "because she loves me, and, and, she loves all children". At the time, Bailey did not have an apartment lease. Eunice Holsaert went on to become the producer of Bailey's first television show, "Sing-A-Song" in 1954.

Bailey's students at the Little Red School House include Mary Travers, who later became a member of the folk music group Peter, Paul and Mary. She took a sabbatical during the 1950–1951 school year to document local music, stories, and dance from Haiti, and developed a reputation for her arrangements of folk songs of Africa and the African diaspora. After several years in television and media, Bailey returned to the classroom to teach at Heathcote School in Scarsdale, New York from 1958 to 1970, and later became involved with the Harlem School of the Arts.

=== Philosophy and beliefs ===
As a teacher, Bailey encouraged dance, movement, and self-expression in her classroom and wrote that "a child's body is his first instrument". She described idle listening as "the ultimate goal of the concert hall – but not of the classroom" and incorporated instruments and cultural dances from around the world into her lessons. Bailey stated "young children do not need to be taught to appreciate music any more than they need to be taught to appreciate play. Children feel music with evergrowing pleasure from the time they are first able to hear any rhythmic sound, word pattern or melody." and that "Children, like all of us, do best and learn most from that which they love to do."

== Television ==
Bailey was early to recognize the educational potential of television when it was an emerging medium. In 1954, she left the Little Red School House to host "Sing A Song with Charity Bailey" on WRCA-TV (now WNBC), the first racially integrated television program in New York City. The show was broadcast on Sundays at noon, and debuted on July 4, 1954. Aimed at children from 7 to 11, the show featured a group of racially integrated children gathered around Bailey's piano as she led them in songs and musical games. "The secret of her TV success" according to the Negro History Bulletin, was that "it was just good fun" The television critic for The New York Times called the show "exciting for creative young minds, but beguiling for adults, as well" and suggested that "the whole family can relax and join in the fun." Due to a lack of commercial sponsor, the last episode aired on March 19, 1956.

In the late 1960s, Bailey created another children's television show for WNET-TV called "Here's Charity". Both were widely praised by both viewers and critics.

== Recording career ==
Bailey began her recording career while she was a teacher. In 1946, she recorded several songs for the second volume of "Songs to Grow On" from Young People's Records. She had an "unusual repertoire" and an "eclectic style and relatively youthful sound" according to the book "Revolutionizing Children's Records". Bailey contributed to six releases with Young People's Records, from which she compiled her bestselling songbook, Playtime with Music, published in the early 1950s.

In 1951, the first of her 14 albums was released by Folkways Records and featured folk musicians including Woodie Guthrie, Pete Seeger, and Lead Belly. Bailey's most notable albums include Songs to Grow on, Vol. 2 (1951), Music Time with Charity Bailey (1952), Follow the Sunset (1953), and More Music Time and Stories (1970). In 1954, the Negro History Bulletin wrote that "Charity Bailey's records have long been favorite gifts to the more fortunate children, and each new release is eagerly anticipated." She contributed to many albums from Folkways Records.

== Personal life and death ==
Charity Bailey was married to Jack White, who worked for the World Health Organization. She did not adopt his last name in her public life. The couple adopted a son named John in approximately 1956. Bailey was described as not tolerating "any condescension from ignorant whites."

In 1978, Bailey died of a heart attack in New York City at the age of 74. Her papers are held at the New York Public Library.
