= Richard Meyer (folk music) =

American singer-songwriter

Richard Meyer (September 6, 1952 – May 14, 2012) was an American folk singer-songwriter, writer, painter, and set designer. Meyer was active in the Greenwich Village folk music scene of the 1980s and 1990s and did much to promote other artists. As one of the leaders of a musicians' cooperative in the Village, he handled booking at the SpeakEasy and edited Fast Folk Musical Magazine (1986–1997). Later, he wrote reviews for various media such as AllMusic. He also worked extensively as a lighting/scenery designer in theater.

His first published recordings were contributions to the Fast Folk records. His first solo album, Laughing/Scared, appeared in 1988, released on Meyer's own label Old Forge. It was followed by two records he made for Shanachie: The Good Life! (1992), and A Letter from the Open Sky (1994). He also designed the artwork for all of these records.

After he had been diagnosed with Parkinson's disease in the late Nineties, Meyer returned to the studio one last time and recorded a double album's worth of new songs: Strange Generosity/ Bitter Moon. This appeared, once again, on his own label Old Forge, and only got a very limited release.

Since the summer of 2008, Meyer's advancing illness had made it impossible for him to live independently, and he spent his last years at a nursing home in the New York area.

In 2024, New Shot Records in Italy posthumously released Bitter Moon, a selection of 13 songs from the Strange Generosity/ Bitter Moon sessions. This was the first time these recordings were made available to a wider audience and the record received enthusiastic reviews. Simultaneously, an accompanying video-documentary, called Anonymous Fame, appeared on YouTube. It features interviews with many people who knew Richard Meyer personally and worked with him over the years.

== Discography ==
- The January Cold (1984, Fast Folk Musical Magazine compilation album Vol. 1, No. 5)
- Laughing/Scared (1987, Old Forge)
- The Good Life! (1992, Shanachie)
- A Letter from the Open Sky (1994, Shanachie)
- First Aid for the Choking Victim (1999, a collection of demos & outtakes, Old Forge)
- Strange Generosity/Bitter Moon (2001, Old Forge) [2-CD]
- Bitter Moon (2024, New Shot Records)

== Video ==
- "Richard Meyer at Cabin Concerts" is a 57:50 video of a house concert performance in Wayne, NJ 3/10/96.
- "Anonymous Fame" is a 20:30 video-documentary chronicling Meyer's life and career, featuring interviews and song excerpts.
