= Jovel Music Hall =

Coordinates: 51°56′53″N 7°38′26″E

- Interactive map of Jovel Music Hall
- Address: Münster; Germany
- Capacity: 1,500
- Type: Music venue

Construction
- Opened: 1979

The Jovel Music Hall is a 1,500-seat concert venue located in Münster, Germany. Notable past performers include Motörhead, Duran Duran and Blue Öyster Cult. The Jovel Music Hall opened in 1979.
