= Frank Christian (singer-songwriter) =

American singer-songwriter

Frank Christian (born Frank P. Caputo, October 19, 1952 – December 24, 2012) was an American, Greenwich Village-based singer-songwriter and guitarist. His best-known song, "Three Flights Up" was recorded by Nanci Griffith for her Grammy Award-winning 1992 release Other Voices, Other Rooms.

Christian also had much success as a sideman. He appeared on dozens of albums, backing such performers as Dave Van Ronk, Suzanne Vega, John Gorka, Nanci Griffith, and The Smithereens.

He began his guitar studies with the jazz guitarist Roosevelt Span.

He was a guitar teacher in New York City. Christian used to quip that if a person had studied blues guitar with Dave van Ronk and had absorbed everything Dave could teach them but still wanted to learn more, van Ronk would then send them to study with Frank Christian.

== Discography ==
- Somebody's Got to Do it (Great Divide, 1982)
- Where Were You Last Night (Gazell, 1992)
- From My Hands (Palmetto, 1995)
- Mister So and So (Palmetto, 1996)

=== As guest ===
- Nanci Griffith, Others Voices Other Rooms (Elektra, 1993)
- Nanci Griffith, Flyer (Elektra, 1994)
- Nanci Griffith, Dust Bowl Symphony (Elektra, 1999)
- The Smithereens, Especially for You (Enigma, 1986)
- Suzanne Vega, Suzanne Vega (A&M, 1985)
- Suzanne Vega, Solitude Standing (A&M, 1987)
- Dave Van Ronk, Sweet and Lowdown (Justin Time, 2001)
- Jack Hardy, White Shoes (Great Divide, 1982)
