= Cultural sustainability =

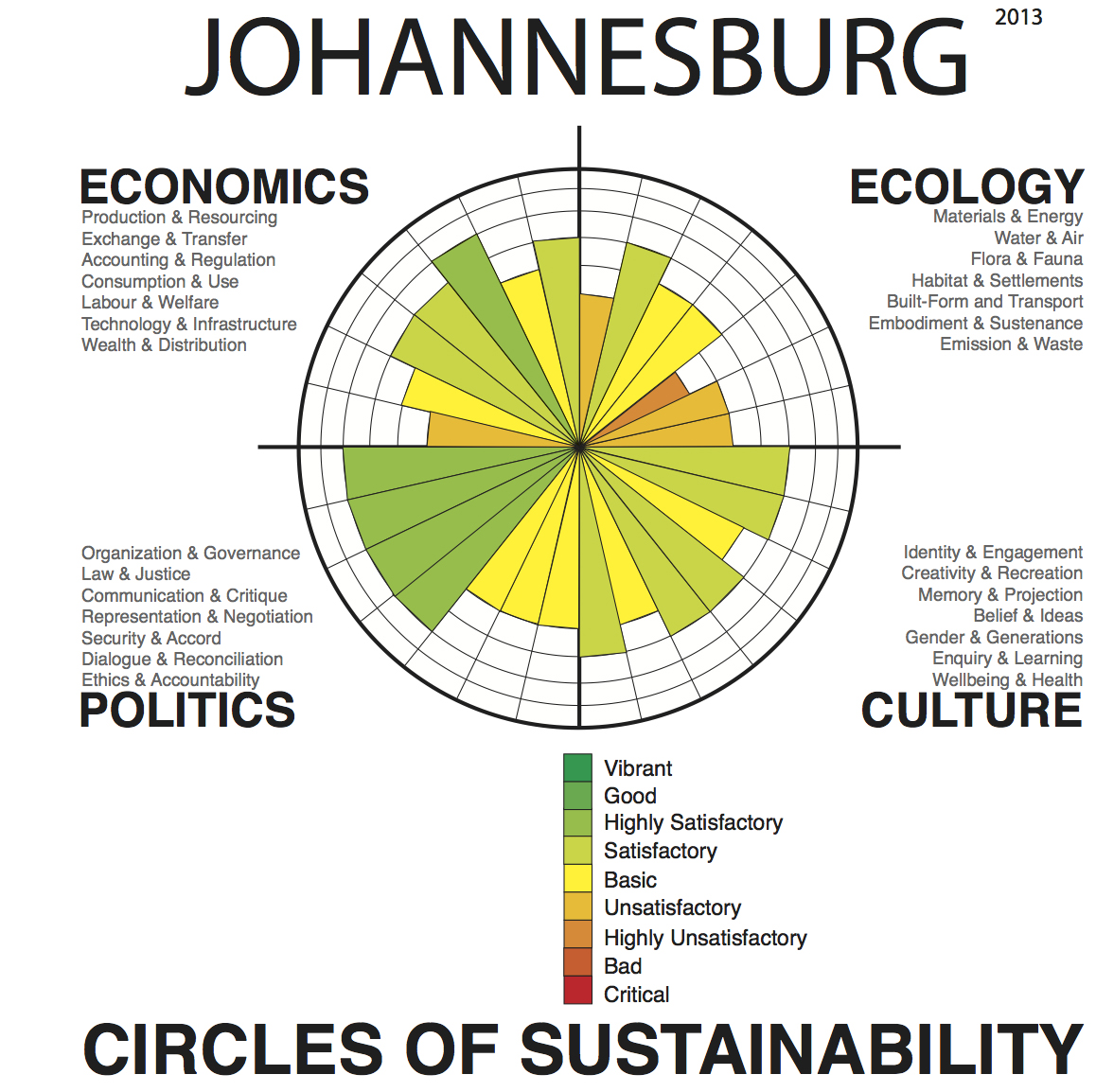
A sustainability profile for Johannesburg using the Circles of Sustainability approach that includes culture as one of its major domains.

The Three Pillars of Sustainability

Cultural sustainability as it relates to sustainable development (or to sustainability), has to do with maintaining cultural beliefs, cultural practices, heritage conservation, culture as its own entity, and the question of whether or not any given cultures will exist in the future. From cultural heritage to cultural and creative industries, culture is both an enabler and a driver of the economic, social, and environmental dimensions of sustainable development. Culture is defined as a set of beliefs, morals, methods, institutions and a collection of human knowledge that is dependent on the transmission of these characteristics to younger generations. Cultural sustainability has been categorized under the social pillar of the three pillars of sustainability, but some argue that cultural sustainability should be its own pillar, due to its growing importance within social, political, environmental, and economic spheres. The importance of cultural sustainability lies within its influential power over people, as decisions that are made within the context of society are heavily weighed by the beliefs of that society.

Cultural sustainability can be regarded as a fundamental issue, even a precondition to be met on the path towards sustainable development. However, the theoretical and conceptual understanding of cultural sustainability within the general frames of sustainable development remains vague. Determining the impact of cultural sustainability is found by investigating the concept of culture in the context of sustainable development, through multidisciplinary approaches and analyses. This means examining the best practices for bringing culture into political and social policy as well as practical domains, and developing means and indicators for assessing the impacts of culture on sustainable development.

== Sociopolitical landscapes ==
Culture has an overwhelming effect on social, economic and political planning, but as of yet, has failed to be incorporated into social, and political policy on a grand scale. However, certain policies regarding both policy and politics have managed to be implemented into some conventions that are implemented on a global scale. Culture is found everywhere within a society, from the relics of previous generations, to the accumulated values of a society. Culture within society can be divided into two, equally important subtopics that aid in the description of cultural specific characterizations. These categories, as defined by the United Nations Educational, Scientific and Cultural Organization (UNESCO) are "Material" and "Immaterial". Material objects such as shrines, paintings, buildings, landscapes and other humanistic formations act as a physical representation of the culture in that area. Although they have little social and political utility, they serve as physical landmarks and culturally dependent objects whose meaning is created and maintained within the context of that society. The accumulation of these cultural characteristics are what measures a society's cultural integrity, and these characteristics are inherently capable of transforming landscapes of political, social and environment nature via the influence that these values and historical remains have on the population.

Little success has come with the implementations of cultural policy within the context of politics due to a lack of empirical information regarding the topic of cultural sustainability. The Immaterial category contains more socially and politically applicable characteristics such as practices, traditions, aesthetics, knowledge, expressions etc. These characteristics embody social and political utility through education of people, housing, social justice, human rights, employment and more. These values contribute to the well-being of a society through the use of collective thinking and ideals i.e. culture. Culture also presents more room for expansion on its effects on a society. Specifically, creativity, respect, empathy, and other practices are being used to create social integration and also to create a sense of "self" in the world.

=== Convention implementation ===
Implementation of policy on a global scale has had little success, but enough to show an increasing interest in the topic of Cultural Sustainability. The conventions that have been implemented, have done so on a large scale, involving multiple countries, across most continents. UNESCO has been responsible for the vast majority of these conventions, maintaining that cultural sustainability and cultural heritage are a strong cornerstone of society. One of the more relevant conventions created in 2003 is the "Convention for the Safeguarding of the Intangible Cultural Heritage" which proclaims that culture must be protected against all adversarial combatants. This safeguard was implemented as an understanding that culture guarantees sustainability. Implementing policy based on cultural history is in the process of becoming a widely talked about subject and holds that cultures will be able to thrive in the context of both present and future. Conventions made by UNESCO regarding cultural preservation and sustainability are surrounding the promotion of cultural diversity, which means multiple cultures and ideals within one grand culture.

== Cultural heritage ==
Cultural memorabilia and artifacts from a cultures history maintain an important role in modern society as they are kept as relics and shrines in order to remember the stories, knowledge, skills and methods of ancestors and learn invaluable lessons from the past. Today, cultures use libraries, art exhibits and museums as a placeholder for these important objects and other culturally significant artifacts. Not only are these objects revered, but the buildings themselves are oftentimes a symbol of cultural integrity to the community which it belongs. Linking with the other pillars of sustainability, the biggest barrier to cultural sustainability is funding. Economic sustainability relies on a number of systems with goals to ensure economic prosperity by eliminating spending where it is not needed. Cultural sustainability relies on how industries open new paths for transition toward a sustainable life. Some ways that humans preserve cultural heritage is through artifacts, cultural sites, and practices while maintaining cultural knowledge also. Cultural buildings such as museums oftentimes fail to receive the funding it needs to continue the preservation of culturally significant artifacts.

Human-centered design and cultural collaboration have been popular frameworks for sustainable development in marginalized communities. These frameworks involve open dialogue which entails sharing, debating, and discussing, as well as holistic evaluation of the site of development.

== Sustainable tourism ==
Tourism is a traveling method for which people can venture to different areas of the globe and experience new ways of living, and explore landscapes not native to their country of origin. Tourism is constantly being criticized for its impact on the social, political and environmental landscapes due to its high volume of mass consumers. Within the realm of tourism exists more sustainable practices and ideals that are aligned with the idea of cultural sustainability.

=== Geotourism ===
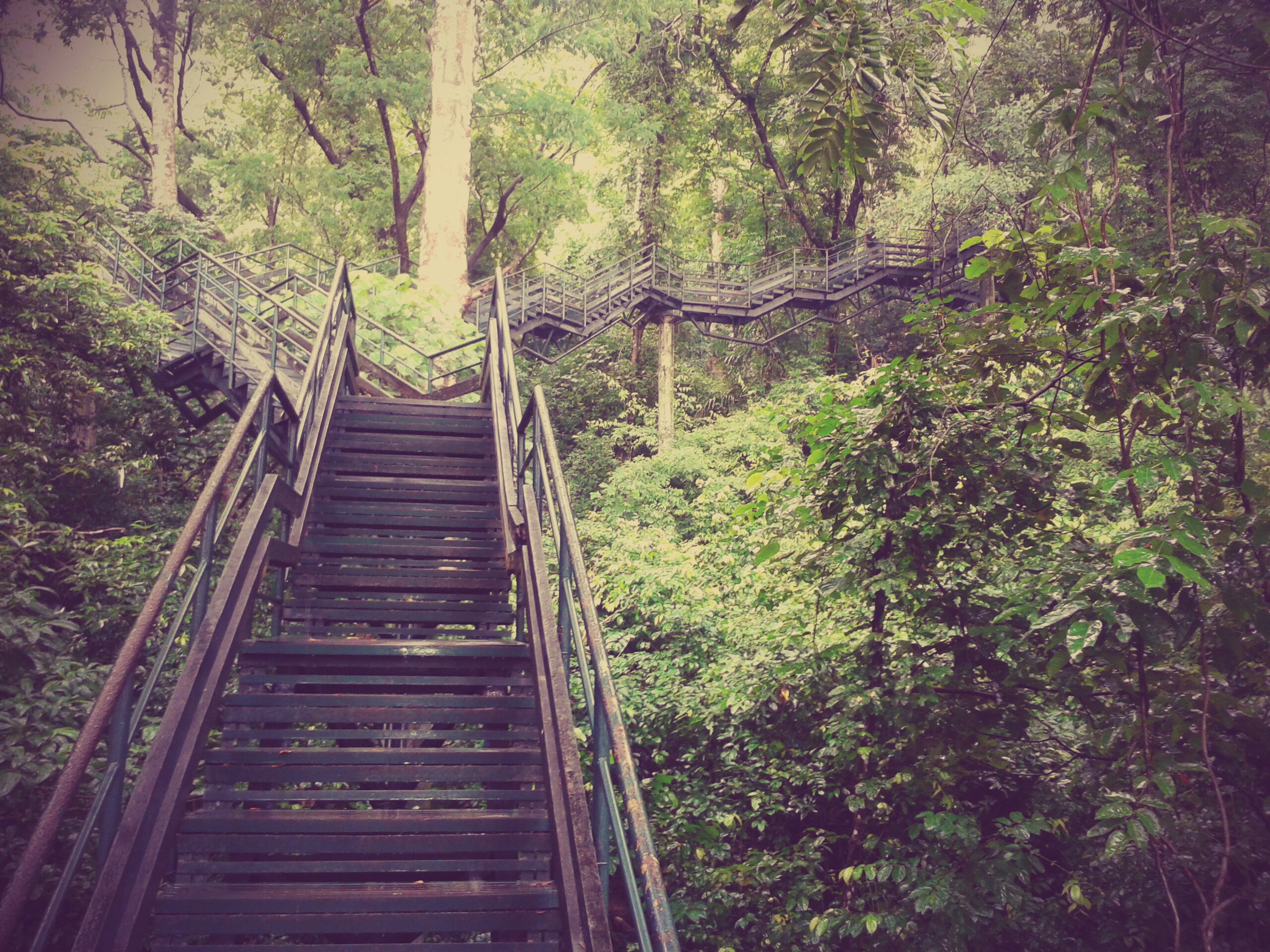

Geotourism is a form of tourism which relies heavily upon the sustainability, or even the improvement of a selected geological location. Serving as an alternative to mass tourism, Geotourism was created with the purpose of aiding in the sustainable development movement. Geotourism is a method which focuses on Sustainable culture, ecological preservation and restoration, welfare of local populous, and the wildlife in the immediate area. The link between Geotourism and Cultural sustainability lies within their role in maintaining the natural state of the environment, including the social and cultural environment. Preservation of the local culture has been a key element of Geotourism from its inception, and due to this form of tourism, travelers are able to experience true local culture, lifestyles, and practices experienced by the people native to that region. The scope of Geotourism covers many geological features, from wider areas such as mountains or coasts to smaller rock formations. This form of tourism provides education regarding destinations they have traveled to via ethnographic methods, and also calls upon the traveler to become aware of the footprint they leave on the environment, as well as social changes that may be harmful to the indigenous peoples. Responsibility plays an important role in Geotourism by informing travelers of their duties to respect, and preserve the local culture. Many countries have adapted this method of tourism, going as far as to implement geotourism sites equipped with guides that discuss matters of importance in that area such as environmental or cultural concerns. Such countries include:

- Many states within the U.S. including California and Arizona
- Romania
- Norway
- Honduras

Geotourism in Honduras includes The Bay Islands, a Caribbean archipelago made up of three main islands, Utila, Roatan, and Guanaja and a few lesser islands and cays located off the north coast of Honduras. These islands have been blessed with stunning natural scenery, highlighted by idyllic beaches, tropical hillsides, and mangrove forests.

- Mexico

Geotourism in Mexico includes Puerto Peñasco. This region includes the protected Sea of Cortez, the Pinacate Crator which offers barren deserts, sacred tribal and Indian lands, fishing zones, estuaries, oyster beds, and vibrant farmland and wine country. Over the past decade, Puerto Peñasco, a former modest fishing village in Sonora situated just 65 kilometers away from the US border, has transformed into one of the most rapidly expanding urban areas in Mexico.

- Canada

Geotourism in Canada includes Nova Scotia. It was visited by explorers and geologists from around the world for centuries, Nova Scotia's geological sites are now recognized for their beauty as much as for their rich history. Nova Scotia’s sites include the iconic lighthouses, which is built on rocky precipices that reach out into the sea.

- Portugal

Geotourism in Portugal includes the Geopark of Arouca, which, in 2010, was officially recognized and joined the Global network of Geoparks, under the auspices of UNESCO. The park is known for its natural, gastronomical, and cultural heritage. This mountainous area, with rivers, natural parks, steep slopes and lush vegetation covers the entire municipality of Arouca. The granite used to build so many religious and historical monuments, Romanesque chapels and Baroque churches in the region came was extracted from its mountains – Freita and Montemuro. As the practice of sustainability in all forms (environmental, social, and economy) becomes a more revered topic and gains traction within political spheres, sociologists suggest refining the practices of tourism to fit a mold that is more conducive to the sustainability models.

Tazim et al. suggests the key to sustainable tourism lies within the responsible practice of travelers, but also within the direct participation of the locals in tourism practices. Although Geotourism shows to be a viable alternative for mass tourism, reducing the footprint of travellers on different parts of the world, there have been criticisms made regarding its fairness to the local population. Issues of fair pay, and the rights of the local people are the basis of the ethical dilemmas this kind of tourism faces. Tourism has a direct effect on the culture of the local populous, and as such, the focus of sociologists has been how to maintain the local environment (physically, socioculturally, and economically) while at the same time, introduce people to a new culture.

== See also ==
- Circles of Sustainability
- Cultural genocide
- Geotourism
- Human rights
