= Jack Hardy (singer-songwriter) =

American singer-songwriter

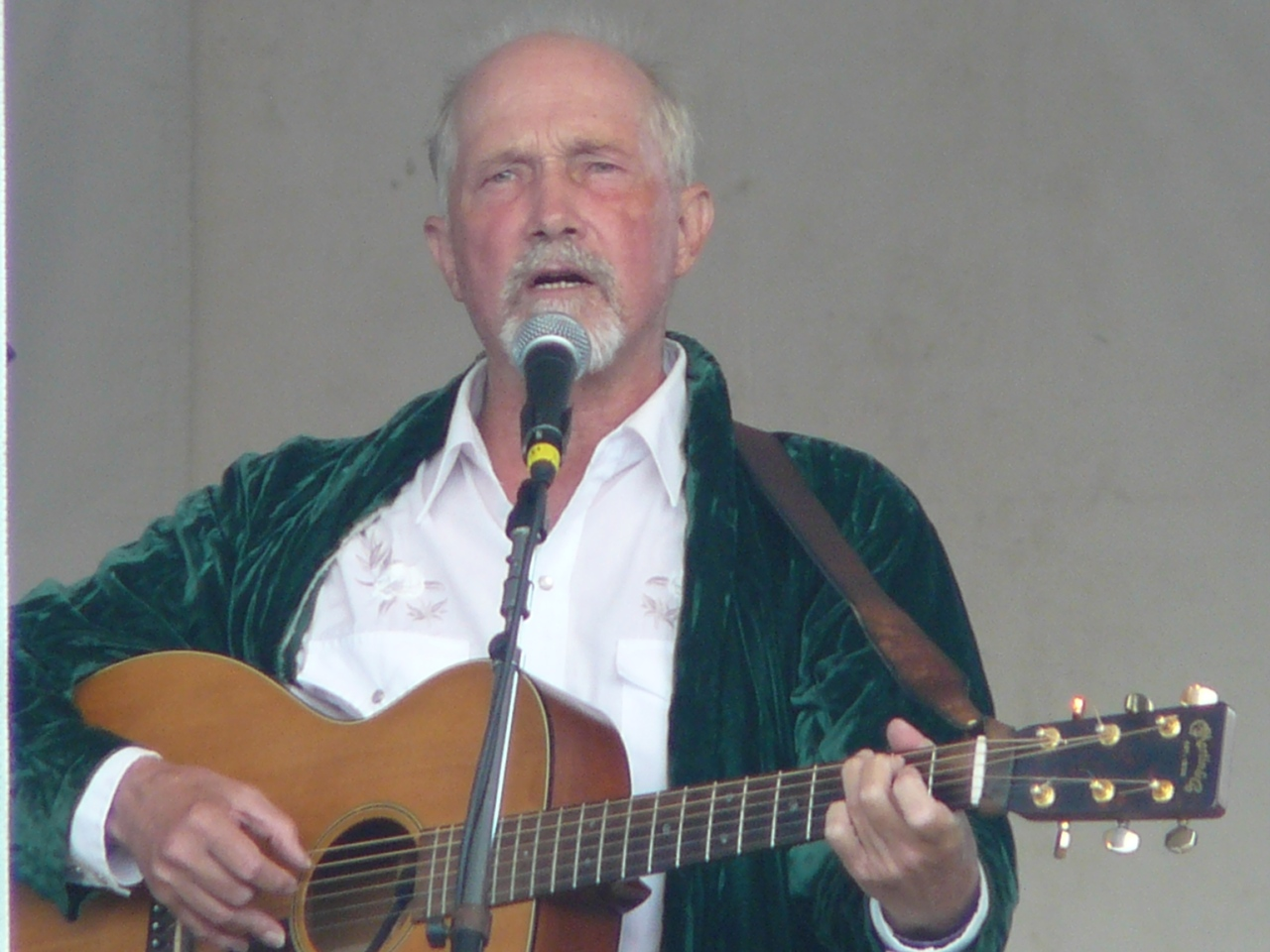
- Hardy performing in 2008

Background information
- Born: John Studebaker Hardy; November 23, 1947
- Origin: Greenwich Village, New York City, U.S.
- Died: March 11, 2011 (aged 63)
- Genre: Folk
- Occupation: Singer-songwriter
- Instruments: Vocals; guitar
- Years active: 1971–2011
- Website: jackhardy.com

John Studebaker "Jack" Hardy (November 23, 1947 – March 11, 2011) was an American singer-songwriter and playwright based in Greenwich Village, who was influential as a writer, performer, and mentor in the North American and European folk music scenes for decades. He was cited as a major influence by Suzanne Vega, John Gorka, and others who emerged from that scene in the 1970s, 1980s, and 1990s. Hardy was the author of hundreds of songs, and toured for almost forty years. He was also the founding editor of Fast Folk Musical Magazine, a periodical famous within music circles for twenty years that shipped with a full album (and later, compact disc) in each issue, whose entire catalog is now part of the Smithsonian Folkways collection.

Hardy died on the morning of March 11, 2011, in Manhattan. He was 63. The cause was complications of lung cancer.

== Career ==
Jack Hardy was strongly identified with Greenwich Village's folk music scene in New York City. Beginning in the mid-1970s, Hardy hosted Monday-night songwriter's circles and pasta dinners at his apartment on Houston Street, a gathering notably open to both established artists and novices. He also began a small, informal songwriters' group at The English Pub in Greenwich Village, which later became a more formal songwriters' night at the Cornelia Street Cafe in December 1977. This group would later evolve into the Songwriter's Exchange, releasing an album on Stash Records in 1980. Eventually, the group formed a cooperative, led by Hardy, and in 1981 took over the booking of the Speakeasy, which became a thriving venue for songwriters. Hardy was also the founder and first editor of Fast Folk Musical Magazine in 1982. Hardy was a graduate of the Pomfret School in Connecticut and the University of Hartford.

Although more popular in Europe than in his native United States for much of his career, the end of the 20th century brought a reignited interest in his music on his native shores. Throughout, he toured on both sides of the Atlantic. Hardy was a lyrical writer; his songs were political, although usually subtly so. His music was often tinged with a Celtic flavor, although his last few albums took on more of a country & western style. Both budget-conscious and disdainful of self-important artistic egos, Hardy recorded all of his albums (almost 15 of them, in a 40-year career) in the same manner: by rehearsing a small band and then recording the entire album "live to tape" in a period of 48 hours or less. In the last few years of his life, Hardy toured with long-time friend and fellow songwriter David Massengill as a duo called the Folk Brothers.

In songwriter circles, Hardy was as well known as a teacher and mentor as he was as an artist. Songwriters gathered at his hallowed Houston Street apartment one night a week to play their latest (and usually unfinished) work, and to face criticism from Hardy and their gathered peers. Fueled by pasta and wine, the weekly songwriters' sessions were famous for the artistic and political conversations that flowed in them and the large number of remarkable songs that emerged from them. Jack suffered neither egos nor nerves, and when the introduction to a new song got too long and/or apologetic from a songwriter, Hardy would bark, "Shut up and sing the song." The hundreds of songwriters who frequented Hardy's apartment gatherings over the years included names both unknown and famous – among them, Suzanne Vega, Shawn Colvin, Brian Rose, Richard Shindell, John Gorka, Tracy Allard, Frank Tedesso, Christian Bauman, Linda Sharar, Rod MacDonald, Lucy Kaplansky, Matthias Clark, Bob Chabot, and Christine Lavin. The weekly songwriter's session itself made it into a number of songs by Hardy alumni, including "Jack's Crows" by John Gorka, the title song of Gorka's second album, and "Boulevardiers" by Suzanne Vega. The group was also immortalized in fictional form in Christian Bauman's 2008 novel "In Hoboken," which included two chapters that took place in the Houston Street apartment, and a character named "Geoff Mason" who bore a striking (and, according to a public radio interview with Bauman, intentional) resemblance to Hardy.

While Hardy's name never achieved the level of fame of Vega, Gorka, or the many he recorded for Fast Folk (including Tracy Chapman, Lyle Lovett, David Wilcox, Elliott Murphy or The Roches), he continually built on his substantial catalog of literate, well-crafted songs. Hardy was awarded the Kate Wolf Memorial Award by the World Folk Music Association in 1996.

Hardy attended college at The University of Hartford, and in 1969 – then editor of the University of Hartford's The News-Liberated Press – Hardy was arrested and convicted of libel after publishing a lewd cartoon that attacked then president Richard Nixon. Hardy was convicted and paid a $50 fine. While the conviction was later overturned on appeal, Hardy remains the only person in the history of the United States that has ever been arrested and convicted of libeling the President of the United States.

Jack Hardy was predeceased by a brother, Jeff, who played bass in Jack's band and appeared on many of his recordings. Jeff Hardy, who worked as a chef for a financial services firm located in the World Trade Center, died in the terrorist attacks of September 11, 2001.

== Discography ==
- Jack Hardy (1971)
- Early and Rare (1965–1974, vol. 1 of The Collected Works of Jack Hardy)
- Mirror of My Madness (1976)
- The Nameless One (1978)
- Landmark (1982)
- White Shoes (1982)
- The Collected Works of Jack Hardy, Part I, Volumes 1 – 5, 1965–1983
- The Cauldron (1984)
- The Hunter (1987)
- Retrospective (1990)
- Through (1991)
- Two of Swords (1992)
- Civil Wars (1994)
- Songs of Jack Hardy (tribute), Volume One: Of the White Goddess (1995)
- The Collected Works of Jack Hardy, Part II, Volumes 6 – 10, 1984–1995
- The Passing (1997)
- Omens (2000)
- Bandolier (2002)
- Coin of the Realm: Songs for the New American Century (2004)
- The Tinker's Coin – Celtic Anthology (2005)
- Noir (2007)
- Rye Grass (2009)
