= David Massengill =

American songwriter

David Massengill (born March 2, 1951, Bristol, Tennessee) is an American folk singer-songwriter, guitar and Appalachian dulcimer player. Massengill considers Dave Van Ronk his mentor, and is fond of quoting Van Ronk's tribute "he takes the dull out of dulcimer" in performance and as the title of his frequent workshops on the instrument. Massengill owns and plays dulcimers carved by Edsel Martin (1927–1999) from North Carolina. Massengill's best-known songs include: "On The Road to Fairfax County", recorded by The Roches and by Joan Baez; "The Great American Dream," performed with Joan Baez and others at a tribute to Mike Porco, former owner of the famed Greenwich Village club Gerde's Folk City; and "My Name Joe", about an illegal immigrant restaurant worker. For some years after he began recording, Massengill maintained a day job as a restaurant dishwasher. He also contributed his poignant dulcimer-centered version of "The Crucifixion" to 2001's multi-artist double-disc tribute to Phil Ochs, What's That I Hear.

In addition to his skills as a singer-songwriter, guitarist, and both virtuoso and educator on the appalachian dulcimer, he is also a prolific author-illustrator of pocket-sized children's books and has performed and recorded children's music. Massengill toured frequently with long-time friend and fellow songwriter Jack Hardy as a duo called the Folk Brothers, until Hardy's death in 2011. As a music educator, Massengill is famed for presenting his "Taking the Dull out of Dulcimer" workshops at festivals and music gatherings around North America, and is one of the instrument's prime proponents in the field of melding traditional and contemporary music styles (including alternate tunings); and is a mentor to many in the dulcimer and folk community in general.

Massengill wrote the score for an unreleased film, Boudica Bites Back, directed by English filmmaker Ken Russell with additional songs by Lisi Tribble, produced by Steve Sullivan.

Massengill was awarded the Kate Wolf Memorial Award by the World Folk Music Association in 2003.

In 2016, the Southern Folklife Collection at the University of North Carolina at Chapel Hill invited Massengill to contribute his works to their archive, alongside collections of works by Dave Van Ronk, Bill Morrissey, and Mike Seeger.

== Discography ==
- Coming Up for Air (1992)
- The Return (1995)
- Twilight the Taj Mahal (1998)
- Various Artists – What's That I Hear (Phil Ochs tribute) (2001)
- My Home Must Be A Special Place (2002)
- We Will Be Together (2006)
- Dave on Dave (2007)
