= Cornelia Street Cafe =

Restaurant in New York City

Cornelia Street Café
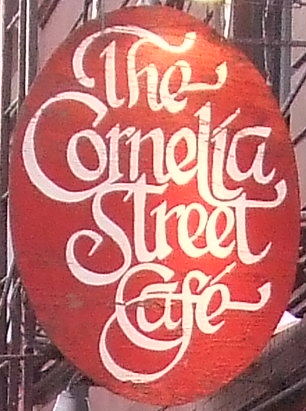

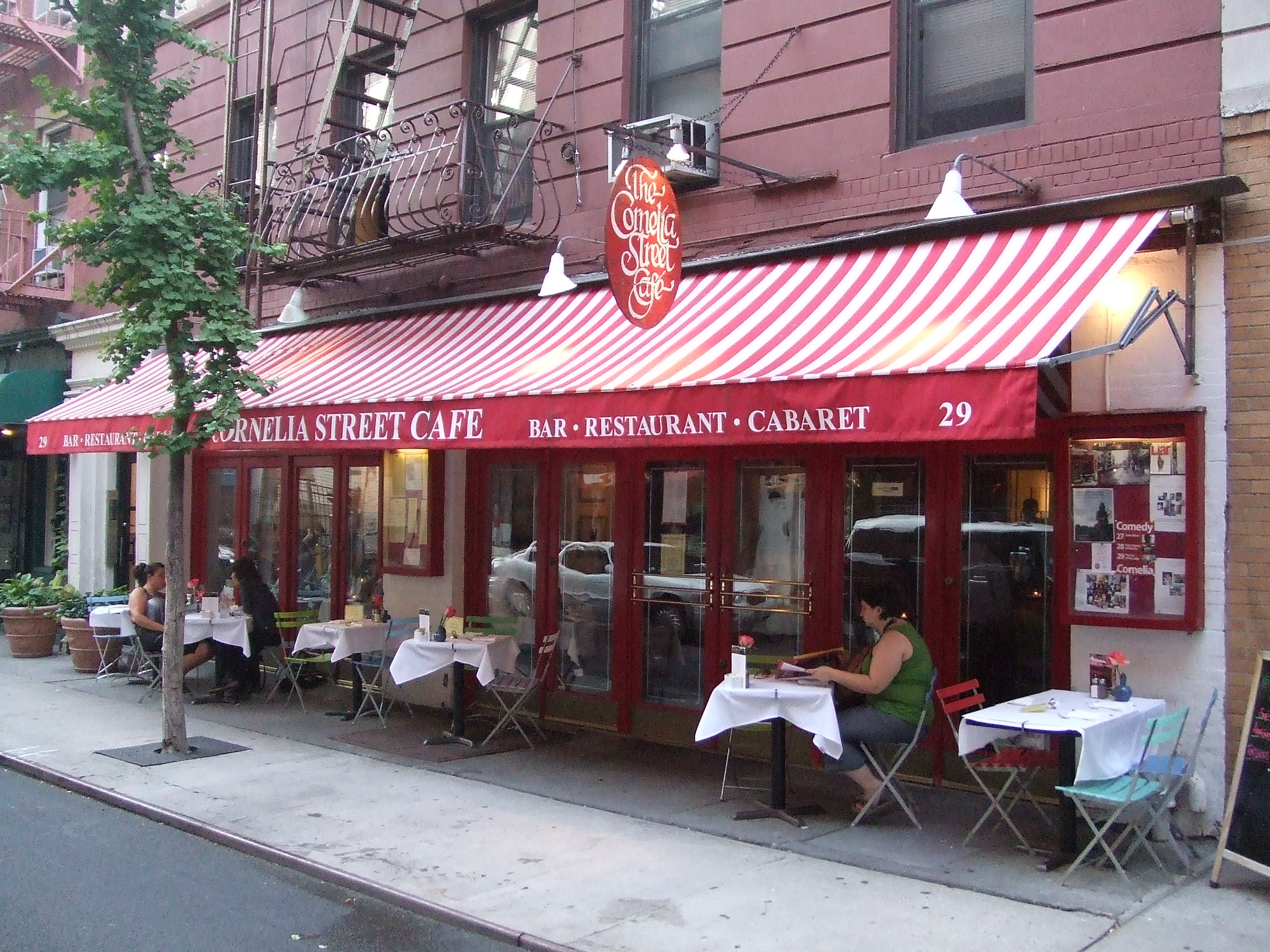
- Cornelia Street Cafe, circa 2009
- Interactive map of Cornelia Street Café

Restaurant information
- Established: July 1977; 49 years ago
- Closed: January 1, 2019; 7 years ago
- Owner: Robin Hirsch
- Previous owners: Judith C. Kallas, Charles McKenna, Raphaela Pivetta, Robin Hirsch
- Dress code: Casual
- Location: 29 Cornelia St., Manhattan, New York City, New York State, United States of America
- Coordinates: 40.731348°N 74.002391°W
- Website: corneliastreetcafe.com

The Cornelia Street Cafe was a restaurant and bar at 29 Cornelia Street in New York City's Greenwich Village, opened in July 1977. The Cornelia Street Café had a 41-year innings in the West Village. It was named "a cultural as well as a culinary landmark" by the City of New York. It produced some 700 shows a year in every conceivable genre (and quite a few inconceivable ones) from science to stilt-walking, from Afro-American poetry to Latin jazz, from Shakespeare at Midnight to the entire Iliad as an experiment in Breakfast Theatre; from members of Monty Python reading children's stories to local kids to members of the Royal Shakespeare Company reciting the poetry of long dead poets on their birthdays; from Carolyne Mas and The Songwriters Exchange to Eve Ensler and The Vagina Monologues. The cafe closed at the end of 2018 because of rising rents from the gentrification of the West Village, ending on its holiday closed day of New Year's Day 2019. The cafe had been voted one of the best places to listen to jazz music in the world.

== Business ==
In the 21st century, the Cornelia Street Cafe was a restaurant and nightclub, showcasing musicians, poets, writers, and artists. In 1998, the cafe was one of the restaurants recognized by the Greenwich Village Society for Historic Preservation with a Village Award presented to "Cornelia Street Restaurants".

== Songwriters Exchange ==
In December 1977, the then-fledgling cafe hosted the first meeting of the Songwriters Exchange, a weekly gathering in which the Village's songwriters could present their new songs – and only new songs – to their peers. Two years later the cafe sponsored Cornelia Street: The Songwriters Exchange, an LP of eight Village singer-songwriters; released by Stash Records, the LP was named "Album Of The Month" by Stereo Review in December 1979, and was later re-released as a CD. It has the first known recordings of several prominent Village artists, including Cliff Eberhardt, David Massengill, Rod MacDonald, Martha Hogan, Michael Fracasso, Brian Rose, Eliot Simon and Lucy Kaplansky (as Simon & Kaplansky), and was Tom Intondi's second recorded work.
