= Smithsonian Folkways =

Nonprofit record label of the Smithsonian Institution

Smithsonian Folkways Recordings
- Founded: 1987
- Founder: Smithsonian Institution
- Country of origin: United States
- Location: Washington, D.C.
- Official website: folkways.si.edu

Smithsonian Folkways is the nonprofit record label of the Smithsonian Institution. It is a part of the Smithsonian Center for Folklife and Cultural Heritage, located at Capital Gallery in downtown Washington, D.C. The label was founded in 1987 after the family of Moses Asch, founder of Folkways Records, donated the entire Folkways Records label to the Smithsonian. The donation was made on the condition that the Institution continue Asch's policy that each of the more than 2,000 albums of Folkways Records remain in print forever, regardless of sales. Since then, the label has expanded on Asch's vision of documenting the sounds of the world, adding six other record labels to the collection, as well as releasing over 300 new recordings. Some well-known artists have contributed to the Smithsonian Folkways collection, including Pete Seeger, Ella Jenkins, Woody Guthrie, and Lead Belly. Famous songs include "This Land Is Your Land", "Goodnight, Irene", and "Midnight Special". Due to the unique nature of its recordings, which include an extensive collection of traditional American music, children's music, and international music, Smithsonian Folkways has become an important collection to the musical community, especially to ethnomusicologists, who utilize the recordings of "people's music" from all over the world.

== History ==
The Smithsonian Folkways Recordings label arose when the Smithsonian acquired a vast collection of recordings from Folkways Records, maintained by Moses Asch. The original 2,168 titles produced by Folkways Records now make up the bulk of the label's collection.

=== Folkways Records ===
In 1905, Moses "Moe" Asch was born in Poland. His father, Sholem Asch, a successful author, made enough money to move the family to Paris in 1912. In 1914, Sholem left Paris for work in New York City and, a year later, sent for his family. The experience at Ellis Island was traumatic for 10-year-old Moe, and, based on his own account, the memory was seared into his mind. Sholem believed in educating his fellow man through his literature, and Moe showed that same passion through his chosen career of audio engineering.

In the mid-1920s, Asch studied radio engineering in Germany, a center for the new science. When he returned to the United States, he worked for various electronic firms before opening his own radio repair business, Radio Labs, during the Great Depression. In this business, Moe built equipment for radio stations and installed recorders for air use. Asch wrote in a 1961 article, "Forming one of the first independent record companies it was natural for me to want to record folk music and people's expression of their wants, needs and experiences."

In 1940, Sholem invited his son with him to New Jersey to meet physicist and humanitarian Albert Einstein, who encouraged Moe to record and document the sounds of the world, which Asch took to be his life calling. Soon after that meeting, in early 1940, Asch founded Asch Records with a small staff and studio located in downtown Manhattan, New York. He allowed any artist to come and record at no charge, in contrast to bigger studios that charged artists fees for using recording equipment. Because of his open-door policy, Asch attracted many young and/or unique "would-be" artists. Due to the American Federation of Musicians' 1942 strike against major record labels, small labels such as Asch's filled the void in sales for distributors. The label grew and became more successful through deals with other producers, including Norman Granz. This partnership proved successful, leading to the concept of recording live concerts. These recordings came close to Asch's vision of documenting "real" sound, and, because there were no studio fees, were less expensive to produce. Around this time, Asch began another record label, Disc Records, though this fell through in a short time. Asch received recordings from Granz of an up-and-coming pianist named Nat Cole, which he decided to issue on a record in fall 1946. He invested a large amount of money in publicity and advertising, for the first time attempting to break into the pop charts. Due to a snowstorm, shipping was delayed past the holiday rush, causing Asch Records to fall into bankruptcy. As one of the terms of his bankruptcy, Asch was barred from starting another label. To get around this, in July 1948, Marian Distler, Asch's longtime assistant, became the president of a new label, Folkways Records and Service Corporation. Asch was hired as her "consultant", and Folkways Records was created. It was at this time that Asch created his plan for keeping all of the Folkways records in print, regardless of demand. In this way, he figured that demand, though small, would continue for decades. He famously remarked, "Just because the letter J is less popular than the letter S, you don't take it out of the dictionary."

Folkways Records released over 2,000 recordings between the years 1949 and 1987, spanning many genres, including jazz, folk, classical, avant-garde, and world music. Over the years of Folkways Records, Asch recorded some of the biggest names in music, including Woody Guthrie, Lead Belly, Pete Seeger, Duke Ellington, James P. Johnson, Dizzy Gillespie, John Cage, and Charles Ives. Reissues of the early blues and folk recordings from Folkways, such as Harry Smith's well-known Anthology of American Folk Music, fueled several generations of folk revivals, inspiring young musicians such as Dave van Ronk, Peter, Paul, and Mary, and Bob Dylan.

=== Smithsonian Institution ===
In 1984, looking for someone to continue the Folkways Records collection after him, Asch found Ralph Rinzler, who was then artistic director of the Smithsonian's annual Folklife Festival. Asch saw that the Smithsonian had the power to keep the collection alive and keep the sounds of the world in the people's hands. Asch stipulated one main condition: that every recording was to remain in print forever, regardless of its sales. It was the way that he began the label, and he felt that the people deserved to have the sounds of the world preserved. There was opposition to the transfer, with some members of the Smithsonian citing the Folkways collection's "uneven quality" and "balance of repertory". Despite these criticisms, Rinzler persevered, and negotiations with Asch continued. Asch died in 1986 before the deal was completed, but his family finished the passing of the Folkways Records to the Smithsonian in 1987.

== Additional acquisitions ==
The collection became known as the Moses and Frances Asch Collection, part of the Ralph Rinzler Folklife Archives and Collections housed in the Center for Folklife and Cultural Heritage. The recordings on other labels, including Folk-Legacy Records, Stinson Records, Paredon Records, Cook, Collector, Dyer Bennet, Fast Folk, Monitor, M.O.R.E., The Mickey Hart Collection, Arhoolie Records and Bobby Susser Songs For Children have since been added to the collection.

== Operations ==
After the creation of the collection in the Smithsonian Archives, only two full-time positions were funded. Rinzler recruited Anthony Seeger, well known in the ethnomusicology community as director of the Archives of Traditional Music at Indiana University, as director, and a full-time archivist, Jeff Place. The Smithsonian also stipulated a condition regarding the transfer: if they accepted the label, it would have to support itself through its sales. Seeger and Place had no experience running a record label, but took on the project. Though they could not retain all of Asch's business practices, they managed to preserve the essence of Folkways Records while creating the new label, Smithsonian Folkways. The label now relies on a small team of full-time staff, part-time staff, interns, and volunteers to continue the mission of Smithsonian Folkways.

== Artists ==
In addition to its vast catalogue of historical recordings, Smithsonian Folkways has recently begun signing and releasing material from living artists. Current artists with albums on Smithsonian Folkways include Dom Flemons, folk trio Lula Wiles, Kaia Kater, Mariachi los Camperos, Los Texmaniacs, Our Native Daughters (artists Rhiannon Giddens, Leyla McCalla, Allison Russell, and Amythyst Kiah), Anna & Elizabeth, and Elizabeth Mitchell (musician). In 2019 they released an album from American composer and musician Laurie Anderson, Tibetan musician Tenzin Choegyal, and activist and composer Jesse Paris Smith.

== Projects ==
Smithsonian Folkways is engaged in several projects dedicated to increasing the awareness and use of its recordings, as well as the preservation of them.

=== Digital distribution ===
As part of their mission in spreading the sounds of the world, Smithsonian Folkways has made the recordings of their archives available digitally in various ways, in addition to retail distribution of CDs (some titles Manufactured on Demand) and LPs.

==== Smithsonian Global Sound ====
In February 2005, Smithsonian Folkways launched Smithsonian Global Sound, an online MP3 music store, similar to programs such as Apple's iTunes. The entire collection was made available online, at the cost of $0.99 per track. Smithsonian Folkways pays royalties to all the artists (and if the artists cannot be found, the money is put in escrow). The purpose of the brand name Smithsonian Global Sound has been altered to provide the entire collection online for streaming for subscribing institutions, such as universities, via the Smithsonian Global Sound for Libraries service, a co-production with Alexander Street Press.

==== folkways.si.edu ====
Smithsonian Folkways now offers the entire Folkways collection for digital download through its website, at $0.99 for most songs and $9.99 for most albums, available in both MP3 and FLAC format. In addition, Smithsonian Folkways distributes digitally via outlets such as iTunes and eMusic.

==== Jazz: The Smithsonian Anthology ====
In 2011 Smithsonian Folkways released a new jazz anthology to update their previous release, the 1973 Smithsonian Collection of Classic Jazz. The anthology includes 111 tracks on six discs, held within a 200-page compilation of historical essays, musical analyses, and contemporary photographs of the musicians.

==== Woody at 100: The Woody Guthrie Centennial Collection ====
In 2012 Smithsonian Folkways released Woody At 100: The Woody Guthrie Centennial Collection, a 150-page large-format book with 3 CDs containing 57 tracks, including Woody Guthrie's most important recordings such as the complete version of "This Land Is Your Land", "Pretty Boy Floyd", "I Ain't Got No Home in This World Anymore", and "Riding in My Car".

==== Lead Belly: The Smithsonian Folkways Collection ====
In 2015 Smithsonian Folkways released Lead Belly: The Smithsonian Folkways Collection, a five-CD, 140-page, large-format book featuring five hours of music including his classics “The Midnight Special,” “Irene,” “The Bourgeois Blues,” and 16 previously unreleased tracks.

==== The Social Power of Music ====
In February 2019, Smithsonian Folkways Recordings released The Social Power of Music, a four-CD anthology and 124-page book exploring the power of music to bring people together, through various musical and social movements from across the United States and the world. The collection includes tracks from The Freedom Singers, Suni Paz, Clifton Chenier, and many others.

==== Jazz Fest: The New Orleans Jazz & Heritage Festival ====
In May 2019, Smithsonian Folkways released Jazz Fest: The New Orleans Jazz & Heritage Festival, a five-disc, 136-page book and box set featuring 50 live tracks recorded live at the New Orleans Jazz & Heritage Festival in celebration of the festival's 50th anniversary. The collection includes music from Allen Toussaint, Professor Longhair, Dr. John, and The Neville Brothers.

==== Pete Seeger: The Smithsonian Folkways Collection ====
Also in May 2019, Smithsonian Folkways released Pete Seeger: The Smithsonian Folkways Collection in celebration of what would have been Pete Seeger's one hundredth birthday. The anthology contains classic recordings, 20 previously unreleased tracks, historic live performances, and special collaborations from Pete Seeger's career, as well as six discs and a large-format, 200-page book.

== Save Our Sounds ==
In 2003, Smithsonian Folkways, in conjunction with the American Folklife Center at the Library of Congress, began a project called "Save Our Sounds" that aims at preserving the sounds vital to American history which are deteriorating, such as Thomas Edison's recordings made on wax cylinders and others done on acetate discs in the early 20th century. The Save America's Treasures program initiated by the White House Millennium Council awarded a matching grant of $750,000 for the project. The goal of the project is to expose the nation to the need for sound preservation, and to protect the most important and "priceless" records from the combined collections.

== Awards ==
Smithsonian Folkways and its collection of labels have earned a variety of awards and honors including 7 Grammy Awards, one Latin Grammy award, 10 Grammy Lifetime Achievement Awards, and 19 Independent Music Awards.

== See also ==
- Smithsonian Center for Folklife and Cultural Heritage
- American Folklife Center
- Smithsonian Folklife Festival
- List of Smithsonian Folkways artists
- List of record labels
