= The People vs. Paul Crump =

- DVD cover
- Directed by: William Friedkin
- Music by: Marty Rubenstein
- Country of origin: United States
- Original language: English

Production
- Producer: William Friedkin
- Cinematography: Wilmer Butler
- Editor: Glenn McGowean
- Running time: 60 minutes
- Budget: $6,000

Original release
- Release: 1962

The People vs. Paul Crump is a 1962 documentary film about prisoner Paul Crump who was on death row for robbery and murder. The People vs. Paul Crump was the directoral debut of renowned filmmaker William Friedkin.

== Content ==
On March 20, 1953, five black men robbed a meatpacking plant in Chicago's Union Stock Yards. The robbery was botched and a security guard was shot and killed. All five men were arrested and later released but Paul Crump, then only 22 years old, who confessed to the murder. He later retracted his confession, but was ultimately convicted and sentenced to death in the electric chair of the Cook County Jail for the murder of the guard. After having received 14 stays of execution, Crump met William Friedkin, who produced the documentary with the hopes of saving Crump's life. The film employs the use of re-enactments to dramatize what happened in Paul Crump's case. The documentary shows the police brutality used to beat a confession out of Crump, which was commonplace in the Chicago police department at the time.

== Production ==
The film's origins date back to 1960 when William Friedkin, then twenty years old, attended a party hosted by Lois Solomon. At the party, Friedkin met Robert Serfling, the Death Row chaplain at the Cook County Jail. Curious, Friedkin asked Serfling if he ever met a prisoner he believed was innocent. To Friedkin's surprise, Serfling responded by saying that there was a man on death row he believed was innocent: Paul Crump.

The film was made for Chicago-area television and was highly praised and crucial to the career of its director William Friedkin, helping him get an agent and jobs making documentaries for David Wolper, and then an episode of The Alfred Hitchcock Hour. The film won the Golden Gate Award Winner for Film as Communication at the 1962 San Francisco International Film Festival.

The film was shot on 16mm black and white negative. In his 2013 memoir The Friedkin Connection, Friedkin claimed that he had never seen a documentary film and had little knowledge of filmmaking. The film was edited on borrowed equipment from the WGN-TV newsroom.

== Aftermath ==
Mere hours before Crump was scheduled to be executed, Illinois governor Otto Kerner viewed the film and it moved him enough to commute Crump's execution. In 1985, Friedkin testified in the courtroom of U.S. District Judge Paul Plunkett: “Our ways crossed in the past, and fortune smiled at me and frowned at Mr. Crump. It made an even bigger obligation to me to do something for his case.” After 40 years in prison, Crump was eventually released to the care of his sister, Gwendolyn Jones, in 1993. However, after his release, Crump struggled with alcohol abuse and paranoid schizophrenia.

In 1999, he returned to prison after being convicted of violating a protection order from his sister. He was then transferred to the Chester Mental Health Center. Soon after, in 2002, Crump died there of pneumonia and lung cancer at the age of 72. Friedkin later remarked: "He had been incarcerated for so long, he couldn’t make it on the outside. He couldn’t make the adjustment."

The film is discussed at length in the 2018 documentary on Friedkin's career, Friedkin Uncut. Filmmaker Francis Ford Coppola said that he was so impressed by The People vs. Paul Crump because it was made by a young filmmaker about his age and resulted in a man's life being saved. Friedkin remarked that The People vs. Paul Crump "was not very well made, but had the effect of saving a man's life." Friedkin said: "My God, film is so powerful. You can save someone's life with film."

A digitally restored version of the film was released by Facets in May 2014.

== See also ==
- List of American films of 1962
