= Condescending Wonka =

Internet meme

An example of the "Condescending Wonka" meme

"Condescending Wonka" is an Internet meme based on the 1971 Willy Wonka & the Chocolate Factory film directed by Mel Stuart. The meme emerged in 2011 and a few years later was described as one of the most popular Internet memes, usually used to convey sarcasm and a patronizing attitude. The meme is composed of a still screenshot from the movie, showing the character Willy Wonka (portrayed by the American actor Gene Wilder), accompanied by a short sentence that varies by context of the meme.

The meme has been used to convey sarcasm and a patronising attitude, sometimes through its combination with another meme such as "Welcome to the Internet" and "You must be new here". Another common variation begins with the words "So, tell me about..." and then continues with a subordinate clause that is deemed impossible by the author. In this way, the target (reader) is invited to share the condescending sentiment of the meme's author towards the criticized recipient. Although there are other scenes where Wonka indeed behaves much in the manner of the meme, the scene in the movie from which the still was taken is actually neither patronizing nor sarcastic in tone, but shows instead Wonka’s dreamy anticipation of the children’s response to a coming revelation of his. Some initial versions of the meme, with sexual innuendoes, were called Creepy Wonka, but eventually diminished in popularity compared to the version dubbed Condescending Wonka (the name was coined in the online Reddit community). Less common variants of the name include Patronizing Wonka or Sarcastic Wonka.

It has been estimated that tens if not hundreds of thousands of variants of the meme, with different captions, have subsequently been created. In 2017, a study of 2,000 British adults concluded that this was their all-time favorite meme. The still has also been described as a lasting part of Wilder's legacy.
