= Hollywood: The Fabulous Era =

- Directed by: Jack Haley Jr.
- Written by: Marshall Flaum
- Produced by: Jack Haley Jr. (producer); Julian Ludwig (associate producer); Mel Stuart (executive producer); David L. Wolper (executive producer)
- Starring: See below
- Edited by: Bud Friedgen; Melvin Shapiro
- Music by: Elmer Bernstein
- Release date: January 23, 1963
- Running time: 60 minutes (US)
- Country: United States
- Language: English

Hollywood: The Fabulous Era is a 1962 American documentary directed by Jack Haley Jr. Produced for ABC, the film was said to "celebrate American culture by means of a panegyric account of the film industry. "

== Content ==
- Lauren Bacall as herself (archive footage)
- Ingrid Bergman as herself (archive footage)
- Humphrey Bogart as himself (archive footage)
- Gary Cooper as himself (archive footage)
- Henry Fonda as Host
- Alan Ladd as himself (archive footage)
- Marilyn Monroe as herself (archive footage)
- Rosalind Russell as herself (archive footage)
- Robert Taylor as himself (archive footage)
- Lana Turner as herself (archive footage)
- John Wayne as himself (archive footage)
