= Friedkin Uncut =

- Directed by: Francesco Zippel
- Written by: Francesco Zippel
- Produced by: Francesco Zippel; Federica Paniccia; Nicola Allieta
- Starring: William Friedkin
- Cinematography: Marco Tomaselli
- Edited by: Mariaromana Casiraghi
- Music by: Costanza Francavilla
- Production company: Quoiat Films
- Release dates: 31 August 2018 (Venice); 5 November 2018 (Italy)
- Running time: 106 minutes
- Country: Italy
- Language: English

Friedkin Uncut is a 2018 Italian documentary film written and directed by Francesco Zippel. It tells the life and career of the film director William Friedkin. The film had its world premiere at the 75th Venice International Film Festival on 31 August 2018. It was released in Italy on 5 November 2018.

== Plot ==
William Friedkin opens the film explaining he believes Jesus and Adolf Hitler are the most interesting people in world history as they represent two extremes of good and evil. The film then presents a series of interviews, including Ellen Burstyn, Francis Ford Coppola, Wes Anderson, and Quentin Tarantino, discussing the production and cultural impact of The Exorcist (1973).

Friedkin discusses his childhood in Chicago, Illinois and his foray into working in television. As a young man, he watched Citizen Kane (1941) and decides to become a filmmaker. For his first film project, Friedkin directs the documentary The People vs. Paul Crump (1962), which contributed to Crump's death sentence being commuted. The film transitions to The French Connection (1971). Friedkin used a cinéma vérité approach and followed actual New York police officers for research into the narcotics trade.

The film jumps to Friedkin's work on Killer Joe (2011), in which Matthew McConaughey and Gina Gershon discuss their performances and Friedkin's approach with actors. Friedkin discusses his preference for one-takes and his selection of actors, including one story in Stacy Keach was initially cast as Father Karras in The Exorcist before Friedkin hired Jason Miller. It next transitions to Sorcerer (1977) and its financial failure at the box office.

Friedkin discusses his cinematic influences, most notably Buster Keaton. He reflects on interviewing Fritz Lang for the 1975 documentary Conversation with Fritz Lang. By 1980, the New Hollywood era was waning; that same year, the controversial film Cruising was released and met with criticism for its portrayal of the gay community. In 1985, Friedkin returns to the crime thriller genre with To Live and Die in L.A.

After multiple decades of directing films, Friedkin turns to directing stage productions, helming several operas including Wozzeck and Aida. At the 74th Venice International Film Festival, Friedkin screens his then-latest film The Devil and Father Amorth (2017), his return to supernatural horror. He concludes the film heavily criticizing film award competitions, calling them a "dirty joke".

== Cast ==
- William Friedkin
- Wes Anderson
- Dario Argento
- Samuel Blumenfeld
- Ellen Burstyn
- Damien Chazelle
- Francis Ford Coppola
- Willem Dafoe
- Caleb Deschanel
- Gina Gershon
- Walon Green
- Walter Hill
- Randy Jurgensen
- Philip Kaufman
- Matthew McConaughey
- Zubin Mehta
- Antonio Monda
- Gianandrea Noseda
- William Petersen
- Michael Shannon
- Quentin Tarantino
- Juno Temple
- Edgar Wright

== Release ==
The film had its world premiere at the 75th Venice International Film Festival on 31 August 2018. It was released in Italy on 5 November 2018. In the United States, it was released in limited theaters on 23 August 2019.

== Reception ==
On review aggregator website Rotten Tomatoes, the film holds an approval rating of 86% based on 14 reviews, with an average rating of 7.6/10. On Metacritic, the film has a weighted average score of 68 out of 100, based on 6 critics, indicating "generally favorable reviews".

Michael Nordine of IndieWire gave the film a B, commenting that "There's nothing particularly new or inspired about Zippel's decision to simply train a camera on Friedkin and let him riff, but the man is such a captivating speaker that it ultimately doesn't matter much." Matt Zoller Seitz of RogerEbert.com gave the film 3 out of 4 stars, writing, "Even viewers of a certain age who grew up on Friedkin's movies and watched the major ones over and over will come away from this movie feeling as if they understand him in a new, deeper way." Deborah Young of The Hollywood Reporter wrote, "this enjoyable doc records a Hollywood master looking back at his career with lucid hindsight and irony."

The film won the 2019 Nastro d'Argento award for Best Documentary About Cinema. It was nominated for the 2019 David di Donatello award for Best Documentary.
