= Mayhem on a Sunday Afternoon =

- Written by: Bernard Wiser
- Directed by: William Friedkin
- Narrated by: Van Heflin
- Country of origin: United States
- Original language: English

Production
- Producers: David L. Wolper; William Friedkin; Harvey Bernhard
- Running time: 60 minutes

Original release
- Network: ABC
- Release: 1965

Mayhem on a Sunday Afternoon was the last of three documentaries William Friedkin made for producer David Wolper. It concerned the world of pro football.

== See also ==
- List of American films of 1965
