= Four Days in November =

1964 film

- Film poster
- Directed by: Mel Stuart
- Written by: Theodore Strauss
- Produced by: Mel Stuart
- Narrated by: Richard Basehart
- Cinematography: Vilis Lapenieks
- Edited by: William T. Cartwright
- Music by: Elmer Bernstein
- Production company: Wolper Productions
- Distributed by: United Artists
- Release date: November 21, 1964
- Running time: 122 minutes
- Country: United States
- Language: English

Four Days in November is a 1964 American documentary film directed by Mel Stuart about the assassination of John F. Kennedy. In 1965, it was nominated for an Academy Award for Best Documentary Feature.

== Summary ==
The film includes Dallas radio and television coverage of:

- The President's arrival at Love Field (Bob Walker, WFAA-TV 8)
- Progression of the motorcade (Bob Huffaker, KRLD Radio)
- First local bulletin of shooting (Jay Watson, WFAA-TV 8)
- Reports at Parkland Hospital (Bob Huffaker, KRLD Radio)
- Official announcement of President's death from Malcolm Kilduff (Roy Nichols, KLIF Radio)

Amateur films and photos include:

- Scenes along the motorcade route
- Orville Nix's films of the motorcade entering Dealey Plaza, the fatal head shot followed by Secret Service Agent Clint Hill climbing on top of the presidential limousine and the post-shooting confusion at the Plaza
- Mary Moorman's photo taken just a fraction of a second after the fatal shot
- Bob Jackson's photo Jack Ruby shoots Lee Harvey Oswald at the Dallas City Jail

== Production ==
The opening credits indicate that "certain scenes have been recreated in the original locations by the actual participants". Some of these recreations include:

- Buell Wesley Frazier driving himself and Lee Harvey Oswald to work at the Texas School Book Depository on the morning of November 22. This scene includes commentary from Frazier and his sister Linnie Mae Randle who saw Oswald arrive at their house and place a package (in which Oswald told Frazier it contained curtain rods but really had the murder weapon) in Frazier's car to take to work.
- Oswald's post-shooting trek from the Texas School Book Depository to the Texas Theater. This segment includes commentary from cab driver William Whaley, who picked Oswald up and took him to his rooming house on North Beckley.
- Jack Ruby's path from his apartment to the Dallas City Jail on the morning of November 24

== Release ==
Four Days in November was originally produced for television; United Artists then acquired the film for theatrical release.

== See also ==
- List of American films of 1964
- Assassination of John F. Kennedy in popular culture
