= The Bold Men =

- Directed by: William Friedkin
- Narrated by: Van Heflin
- Country of origin: United States
- Original language: English

Production
- Producer: David L. Wolper
- Running time: 52 minutes

Original release
- Network: ABC
- Release: March 20, 1965

The Bold Men is a 1965 documentary film directed by William Friedkin. It was the first of three documentaries Friedkin made for producer David Wolper.

== See also ==
- List of American films of 1965
