= Willy Wonka & the Chocolate Factory =

1971 film by Mel Stuart

- Theatrical release poster
- Directed by: Mel Stuart
- Screenplay by: Roald Dahl; David Seltzer (uncredited)
- Based on: Charlie and the Chocolate Factory by Roald Dahl
- Produced by: Stan Margulies; David L. Wolper
- Starring: Gene Wilder; Jack Albertson; Peter Ostrum; Roy Kinnear; Denise Nickerson; Leonard Stone; Julie Dawn Cole; Paris Themmen; Dodo Denney
- Cinematography: Arthur Ibbetson
- Edited by: David Saxon
- Music by: Leslie Bricusse (songs); Anthony Newley (songs); Walter Scharf (score)
- Production companies: Wolper Pictures; The Quaker Oats Company
- Distributed by: Paramount Pictures (Note: Warner Bros. Pictures acquired the film rights in 1977 through the acquisition of Wolper Company)
- Release date: June 30, 1971
- Running time: 100 minutes
- Country: United States
- Language: English
- Budget: $3 million
- Box office: $5.8 million

Willy Wonka & the Chocolate Factory is a 1971 American musical fantasy film directed by Mel Stuart from a screenplay by Roald Dahl, based on Dahl's 1964 novel Charlie and the Chocolate Factory. It stars Gene Wilder as chocolatier Willy Wonka. The film tells the story of a poor child named Charlie Bucket (Peter Ostrum) who, upon finding a Golden Ticket in a chocolate bar, wins the chance to visit Willy Wonka's chocolate factory along with four other children from around the world.

Filming took place in Munich from August to November 1970. Dahl was credited with writing the film's screenplay; however, David Seltzer was brought in to do an uncredited rewrite. Against Dahl's wishes, changes were made to the story, and other decisions made by the director led Dahl to disown the film. The musical numbers were written by Leslie Bricusse and Anthony Newley while Walter Scharf arranged and conducted the orchestral score.

Willy Wonka & the Chocolate Factory was released in the United States on June 30, 1971, by Paramount Pictures. While the film received positive reviews from critics, it was not a major financial success, earning just $4 million by the end of its original run. It received a nomination for Best Original Score at the 44th Academy Awards and Wilder was nominated for Best Performance in a Motion Picture – Comedy or Musical at the 29th Golden Globe Awards. The film also introduced the song "The Candy Man", which went on to be recorded by Sammy Davis Jr. and become a popular hit. Willy Wonka & the Chocolate Factory has since become highly popular through television airings and home video sales. In 2014, the film was selected for preservation in the United States National Film Registry by the Library of Congress, as being "culturally, historically, or aesthetically significant".

== Plot ==
Charlie Bucket, a 12-year-old paperboy from a poor family, passes by Willy Wonka's chocolate factory in Charlie's town, where a tinker tells him that nobody ever enters or exits the building. Charlie's grandfather, Joe, reveals that Wonka shut down the factory some years earlier due to espionage from rival confectioners. Though production resumed three years later, the factory remained closed to the public and the identities of the new workers remain unknown.

The next day, it is globally announced that Wonka has hidden five Golden Tickets in Wonka Bars; the finders of the tickets will receive a private tour of the factory and a lifetime supply of chocolate. The first four tickets are found by the gluttonous West German Augustus Gloop, the spoiled Veruca Salt, the gum-loving Violet Beauregarde, and the television-loving Mike Teevee. A mysterious man is seen speaking to each child.

Someone in Paraguay claims to have found the last ticket, but the authorities discover that it was forged. On the day before the factory tour, Charlie finds money in a gutter and uses it to purchase a Wonka Bar, which contains the fifth Golden Ticket. On his way home, Charlie encounters the mysterious man. He introduces himself as Arthur Slugworth, one of Wonka's rivals, and offers Charlie a large sum of money in exchange for a sample of Wonka's latest invention, the Everlasting Gobstopper. Arriving home with the Golden Ticket, Charlie asks Grandpa Joe to chaperone him to the factory.

The next day, Wonka greets the children and the five accompanying adults at the factory gates and leads them inside, passing Slugworth on the way. Once inside, they are required to sign a contract. Inside, they meet the Oompa-Loompas, Wonka's workforce, and receive Everlasting Gobstoppers. All of the children have separate incidents disobeying Wonka's instructions and, apart from Charlie, are expelled from the tour: Augustus is sucked up a pipe after falling into the Chocolate River, Violet is transformed into a giant blueberry from chewing experimental gum, Charlie and Grandpa Joe sample Fizzy Lifting Drinks causing them to float dangerously close to a large fan but descend safely by burping, Veruca and her father fall down a garbage chute, and Mike is shrunken after misusing the Wonkavision teleporter.

When the tour is over, Wonka hastily dismisses Charlie and Grandpa Joe and retreats to his office. When Grandpa Joe asks Wonka about Charlie's promised lifetime supply of chocolate, Wonka tells them that they have forfeited it on the grounds that they violated the contract by stealing the Fizzy Lifting Drinks. Grandpa Joe wishes to give the Gobstopper to Slugworth out of spite, but Charlie returns it to Wonka. Wonka declares Charlie the winner of the contest and reveals that "Slugworth" was actually one of his employees, Mr. Wilkinson, and that the offer was a test of character for the children. Wonka then invites Charlie and Grandpa Joe to fly over the town in the Wonkavator, a multi-directional glass elevator. Wonka explains that he created the contest to find an honest child to succeed him as the factory's owner; as the winner, Charlie, along with his family, is invited to come and live in the factory.

== Cast ==
The main cast during filming in 1970: Back row (left to right): Böllner, Reit, Wilder Second row (left to right): Stone, Kinnear, Denney, Albertson Front row (left to right): Nickerson, Cole, Themmen, Ostrum

- Gene Wilder as Willy Wonka
- Jack Albertson as Grandpa Joe
- Peter Ostrum as Charlie Bucket
- Roy Kinnear as Henry Salt
- Julie Dawn Cole as Veruca Salt
- Leonard Stone as Sam Beauregarde
- Denise Nickerson as Violet Beauregarde
- Dodo Denney as Mrs. Teevee
- Paris Themmen as Mike Teevee
- Ursula Reit as Mrs. Gloop
- Michael Böllner as Augustus Gloop
- Diana Sowle as Mrs. Bucket
- Aubrey Woods as Bill
- David Battley as Mr. Turkentine
- Günter Meisner as Arthur Slugworth/Mr. Wilkinson
- Peter Capell as The Tinker
- Werner Heyking as Mr. Jopeck
- Peter Stuart as Winkelmann

== Production ==
=== Development ===
The idea for adapting the Roald Dahl book Charlie and the Chocolate Factory into a film came about when director Mel Stuart's 10-year-old daughter (Note: Madeline Stuart, who makes an uncredited appearance in the film as Madeline Durkin, a classmate in Charlie Bucket's school.) read the book and asked her father to make a film out of it, with "Uncle Dave" (producer David L. Wolper, who was not related to the Stuarts) producing. Stuart showed the book to Wolper, who happened to be in the midst of talks with the Quaker Oats Company regarding a vehicle to introduce a new candy bar from its Chicago-based Breaker Confections subsidiary (subsequently renamed The Willy Wonka Candy Company and sold to Nestlé). Wolper persuaded the company, which had no previous experience in the film industry, to buy the rights to the book and finance the picture for the purpose of promoting a new Quaker Oats "Wonka Bar".

==== Writing ====
Wolper and Roald Dahl agreed that Dahl would also write the screenplay. Though credited for the film, Dahl had not delivered a completed screenplay at the start of production and only gave an outline pointing to sections of the book. Wolper called in David Seltzer for an uncredited rewrite after Dahl left over creative differences. Wolper promised to produce Seltzer's next film (Note: One Is a Lonely Number (1972)) for his lack of a credit as they needed to maintain credibility by keeping Dahl's name attached to the production. Also uncredited were several short humorous scenes by screenwriter Robert Kaufman about the Golden Ticket hysteria. Changes to the story included Willy Wonka's character given more emphasis over Charlie Bucket; Arthur Slugworth, originally a minor character who was a Wonka industry rival in the book, reworked into a spy so that the film could have a villain for intrigue; the absence of Mr. Bucket; a belching scene added with Grandpa Joe and Charlie having "fizzy lifting drinks"; the walnut-shelling squirrels changed to golden-egg-laying geese; and the ending dialogue.

Seltzer also created a recurring theme that had Wonka quote from various literary sources, such as Arthur O'Shaughnessy's Ode, Oscar Wilde's The Importance of Being Earnest, Samuel Taylor Coleridge's The Rime of the Ancient Mariner and William Shakespeare's The Merchant of Venice. After completing the screenplay, Seltzer was exhausted and went on vacation to a remote cabin in Maine. However, while filming the final scene, Stuart was unhappy with the ending having Dahl's version of Grandpa Joe just exclaiming "Yippee!" The director tracked down the writer to the only phone in the area which was attached to a tree. By chance, Seltzer was passing and answered the call. Stuart told him to think up an ending quickly as the production was waiting at great expense. (Note: The production was costing the studio $30,000 an hour.) Seltzer could only recall the overused phrase to fairytale endings and therefore reworked Wonka's final line to Charlie: "Don't forget what happened to the man who suddenly got everything he always wanted? ... He lived happily ever after."

==== Songwriting ====
Wolper decided with Stuart that the film would be a musical and approached composers Richard Rodgers and Henry Mancini but both declined. Eventually, they secured the songwriting team Leslie Bricusse and Anthony Newley.

==== Title change ====
Different explanations have been given for the title change to Willy Wonka & the Chocolate Factory. In the United States during the 1960s, the term "Mister Charlie" had been used as a pejorative expression in the African-American community for a "white man in power" (historically plantation slave owners) and press reports claimed the change was due to "pressure from black groups". During the same period, U.S. soldiers in the Vietnam War used the derisive term "Charlie" for the Viet Cong, originating from the acronym VC using the callsign "Victor Charlie". The studio publicity stated that the title "was changed to put emphasis on the eccentric central character of Willy Wonka". However, Wolper said he changed the title to make the product placement for the Wonka Bar have a closer association. Stuart confirmed the matter was brought to his attention by some African-American actors and he also claimed to have changed the title, saying, "If people say, 'I saw Willy Wonka,' people would know what they were talking about. If they say, 'I saw Charlie,' it doesn't mean anything".

The book was also in the midst of a controversy when the film was announced. Protest groups including the NAACP had taken issue with the original Oompa-Loompas depicted as African Pygmies and compared them to slavery. Stuart addressed the concerns for the film and suggested making them the distinctive green-and-orange characters.

==== Costume ====
Gene Wilder wanted specific changes to Wonka's costume, including what type of trousers the character should wear, "the color and cut" of his jacket and the placement of pockets. Wilder also requested making Wonka's hat smaller, saying "The hat is terrific, but making it 2 inches [5 cm] shorter would make it more special".

=== Casting ===
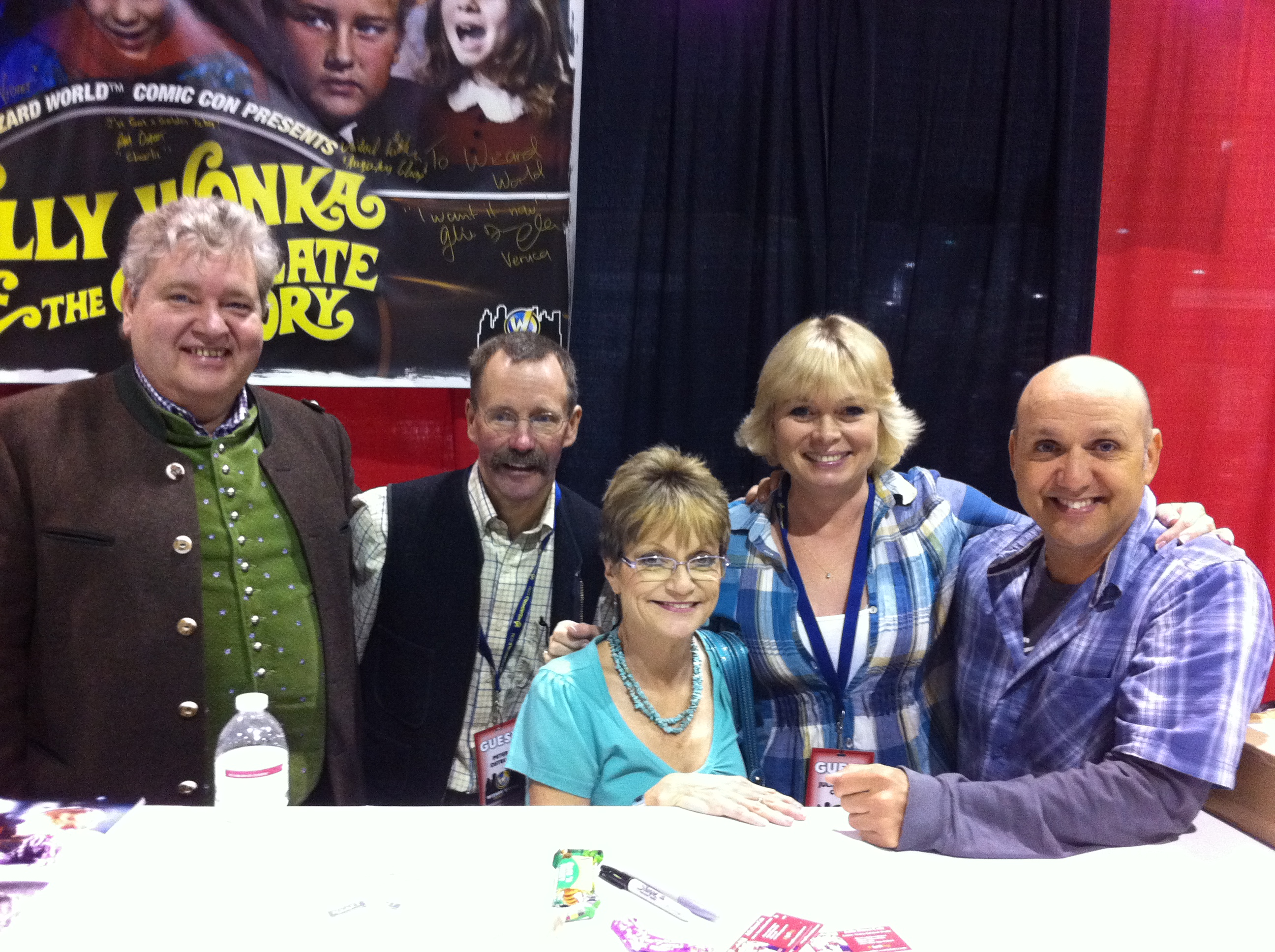
The child cast of Willy Wonka & the Chocolate Factory in 2011

Before Wilder was officially cast as Willy Wonka, producers considered many actors. All six members of Monty Python (Graham Chapman, John Cleese, Eric Idle, Terry Gilliam, Terry Jones, and Michael Palin) expressed interest in playing Wonka, but at the time they were deemed not big enough names for an international audience. (Note: Cleese, Idle, and Palin were later considered for the same role in Tim Burton's version.) Spike Milligan was Roald Dahl's original choice. Peter Sellers reportedly begged Dahl for the role. Joel Grey was the front runner for the part but Stuart decided he was not physically imposing enough as the actor's height was five-foot-five. The producers learned that Fred Astaire wanted the part but the 72-year-old may have considered himself too old. (Note: Stuart confirmed Astaire's interest was a "long-standing myth", and believed the source of this detail was the film's composer, Leslie Bricusse, who said that the actor would have loved to play the role but did not communicate this to the director or producer.)

Actors were auditioned for the role of Willy Wonka in a suite at the Plaza Hotel in New York and by the end of the week Wilder had walked in. It was then Stuart and producer Wolper realised that they could stop looking. Wolper remarked, "The role fit him tighter than one of Jacques Cousteau's wetsuits." Stuart was captivated by Wilder's "humor in his eyes" and said, "His inflection was perfect. He had the sardonic, demonic edge that we were looking for." Wolper tried to suppress Stuart's eagerness for Wilder as he wanted to negotiate the salary. Regardless, Stuart ran out into the hall as Wilder was leaving and offered him the part of Wonka.

When Wilder was cast as Wonka, he accepted the role on one condition:

When I make my first entrance, I'd like to come out of the door carrying a cane and then walk toward the crowd with a limp. After the crowd sees Willy Wonka is a cripple, they all whisper to themselves and then become deathly quiet. As I walk toward them, my cane sinks into one of the cobblestones I'm walking on and stands straight up, by itself; but I keep on walking, until I realize that I no longer have my cane. I start to fall forward, and just before I hit the ground, I do a beautiful forward somersault and bounce back up, to great applause.

— Gene Wilder

Stuart responded, "What do you want to do that for?" Wilder answered, "From that time on, no one will know if I'm lying or telling the truth." Wilder was adamant that he would decline the role otherwise.

Jean Stapleton turned down the role of Mrs. Teevee. Jim Backus was considered for the role of Sam Beauregarde. Sammy Davis Jr. wanted to play Bill, the owner of Bill's Candy Shop but Stuart did not like the idea because he felt that the presence of a big star in the candy store scene would break the reality; however, Davis turned Bill's signature song, "The Candy Man", into a big hit. Anthony Newley also wanted to play Bill but Stuart also dissuaded him for the same reason.

Ten actors of short stature were the Oompa-Loompas, including one woman and nine men, and were cast internationally from France, Germany, Malta, Persia (now Iran), Turkey and the United Kingdom. They were portrayed by Rudy Borgstaller, George Claydon, Malcolm Dixon, Rusty Goffe, Ismed Hassan, Norman McGlen, Angelo Muscat, Pepe Poupee, Marcus Powell and Albert Wilkinson.

The child actors who were auditioned from hundreds, Julie Dawn Cole, Denise Nickerson, Peter Ostrum and Paris Themmen, all had acting experience from drama school, theatre, television or commercials. Michael Böllner had the primary attribute of being rotund and was discovered in Germany when Stuart was location scouting. Stuart asked him to imagine being stuck in a tube and then "squeezed him like a roll of putty".

=== Filming ===
Principal photography commenced on August 31, 1970, and ended on November 19, 1970. After location scouting in Europe, including the Guinness brewery in Ireland and a real-life chocolate factory in Spain, production designer Harper Goff decided to house the factory sets and the massive Chocolate Room at Bavaria Studios. It was also significantly cheaper than filming in the United States, and the primary shooting locations in Munich, Bavaria, West Germany were conducive to the desired atmosphere for Wonka's factory. Stuart also liked the ambiguity and unfamiliarity of the location.

==== Locations ====
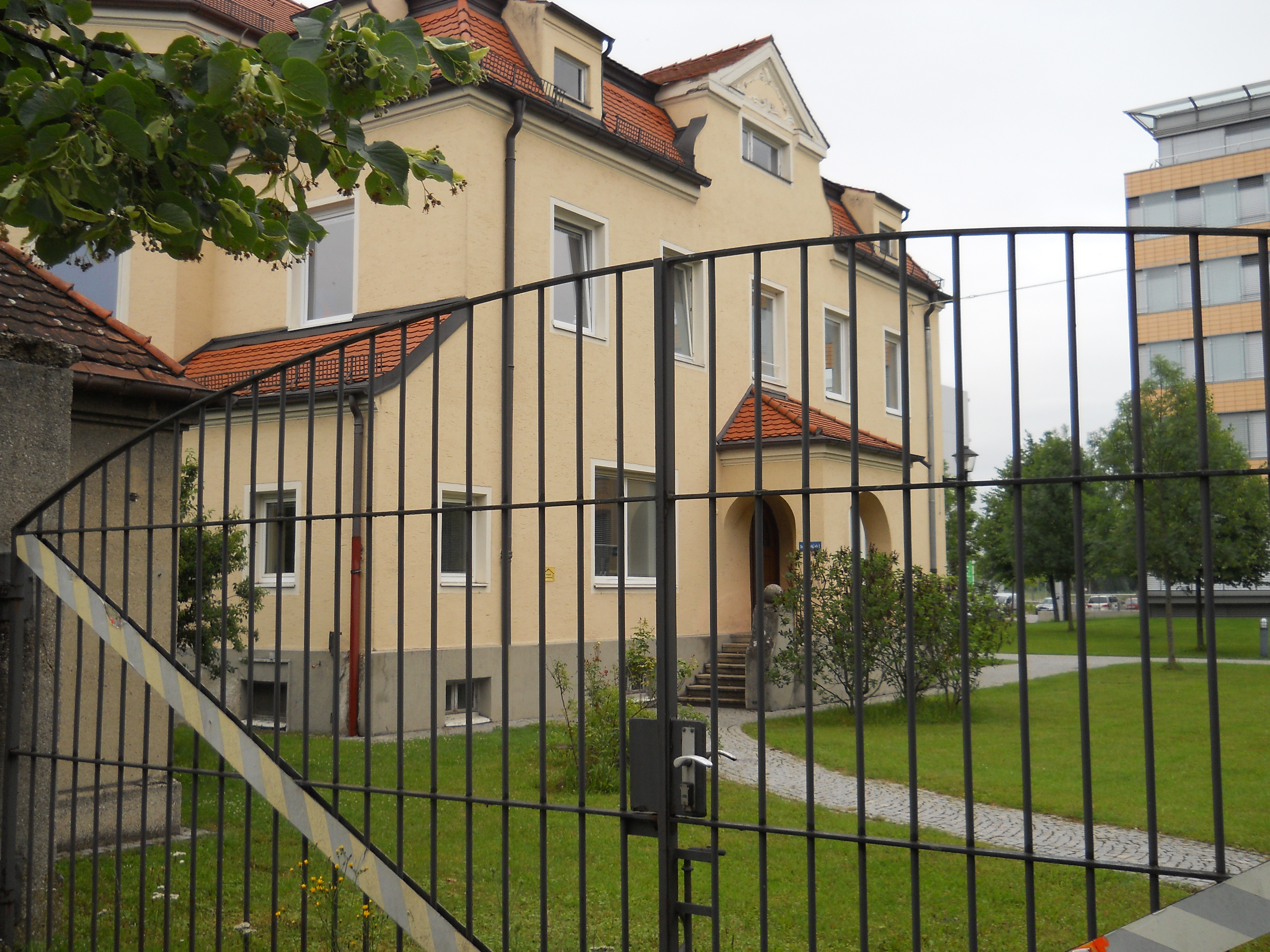
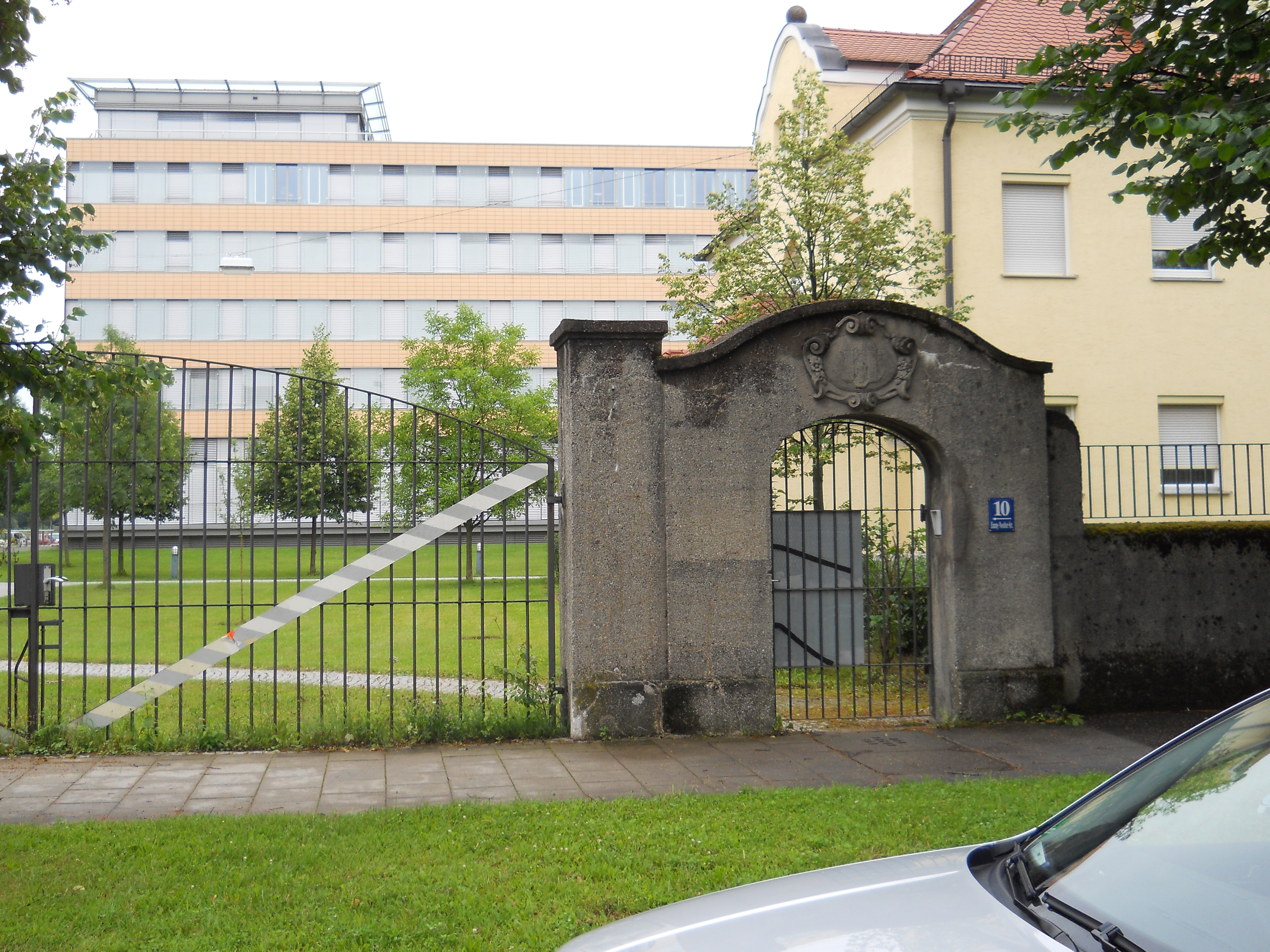
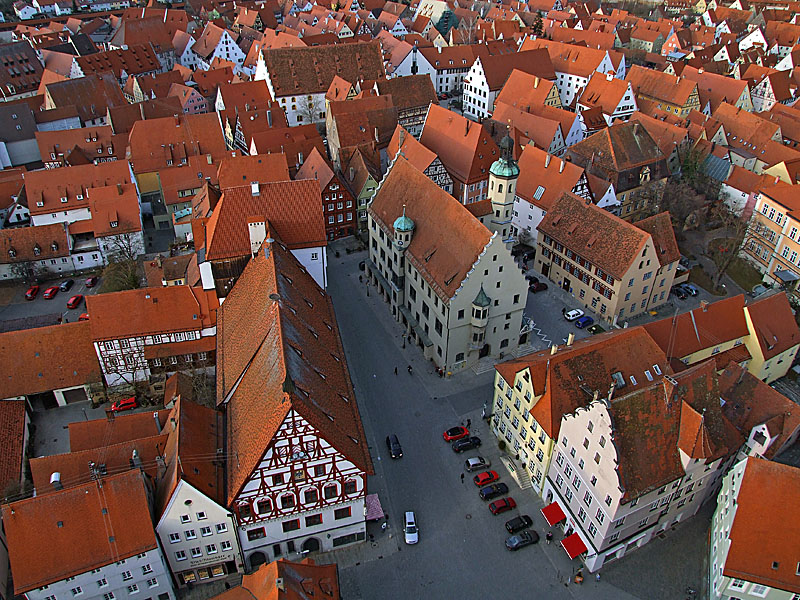
Munich Gasworks as it appeared in 2011 (top and middle), and Nördlingen, the town seen from above at the end of the film

External shots of the factory were filmed at the gasworks of Stadtwerke München (Emmy-Noether-Straße 10); the entrance and side buildings still exist as of 2021. The exterior of Charlie Bucket's house, a set constructed solely for the film, was filmed at Quellenstraße in Munich. Charlie's school was filmed at Katholisches Pfarramt St. Sylvester, Biedersteiner Straße 1 in Munich. Bill's Candy Shop was filmed at Lilienstraße, Munich. The closing sequence, in which the Wonkavator is flying above the factory, is footage of Nördlingen, Bavaria and the elevator rising shot showing that it shoots out of the factory was from Bößeneckerstraße 4, 86720 Nördlingen, Germany, now the location of a CAP-Märkte.

==== Production design ====
The construction of the original Inventing Room was meant to be an industrial room with steel tubes. Stuart envisioned it differently as a wacky inventor's laboratory, with Rube Goldberg-type mechanisms and unusual contraptions and wanted it redesigned to be like Wonka's personality. Goff sent his construction crew into Munich searching junkyards, bakeries and car dealers for discarded machinery, tin funnels, and any other raw materials. This included building Wonka's three-course gum machine, which was originally a solid-state device but Stuart requested an appliance whose operations had a visual experience for the audience. Stuart also instructed Goff to have all the props, furniture and fittings, excluding the light bulbs, in Wonka's original office to be cut in half, to reflect the character's eccentricity. Stuart stated, "I couldn't face the thought of ending the journey through this fabulous factory in an ordinary-looking office."

About a third of the props in the Chocolate Room set were edible. Veruca Salt (Cole) had a chocolate watermelon; Mike Teevee (Themmen) had gum balls from a tree; Violet Beauregarde (Nickerson)'s "three-course gum" was actually a toffee-based candy and marzipan was freely available on set; also there were giant mushrooms filled with whipped cream, and the trees had edible leaves. The inedible items included giant gummy bears that were plastic (the ears were edible, however); the flavored wallpaper was not actually flavored; and Wonka's flower cup was made of wax which Wilder would chew on camera and spit out after each take.

According to Themmen, who played Mike Teevee, "The river was made of water with food coloring. At one point, they poured some cocoa powder into it to try to thicken it but it didn't really work. When asked [what the river was made of], Michael Böllner, who played Augustus Gloop, answers, 'It vas dirty, stinking vater.'" A combination of salt conditioner and some chemicals eventually removed the stink problem but it remained cold, dirty water. Böllner stated that he was scared that he was going to hit his head to the solid river floor every time he jumped in.

In the scene at Henry Salt (Roy Kinnear)'s peanut factory, where thousands of Wonka bars were being unwrapped to find a Golden Ticket, the bars were actually made of wood, which was a cheaper solution than rewrapping thousands of bars of real chocolate.

==== Performances ====
For the performances, Stuart used a recurring "method" tactic in a few scenes. When Wonka makes his entrance at the factory gates, nobody was aware of Wilder's approach as he limped then somersaulted; the reaction was of real surprise. The director gave explicit instructions not to allow the child actors to see the Chocolate Room set until the day of the shoot as he wanted their reactions to be genuine. The exception was Julie Dawn Cole, as Goff gave her a sneak preview. Also, the actors were not warned about the tunnel boat ride scene. Similarly, when Wilder rehearsed the Wonka office scene, with Peter Ostrum as Charlie and Jack Albertson as Grandpa Joe, it was in a much calmer tone. When filming started, he increasingly became angry. When he shouted, "So you get nothing!", it was so that the reactions would be authentic.

==== Other issues ====
Stuart had issues with the large size of the Chocolate Room set that caused difficulties lighting the background. Cole's performance of "I Want It Now" as Veruca Salt required 36 takes and was filmed on her thirteenth birthday. Director-choreographer Bob Fosse came in every afternoon to complain because the filming was overrunning towards the end and stopping him from shooting Cabaret (1972) on the same stage.

==== Retrospective ====
In addition to the main scenes set in town and at the factory, several comic interludes were also shot. In his book Pure Imagination: The Making of Willy Wonka and the Chocolate Factory, Stuart revealed that his favorite interlude was cut after poor test screenings. In the scene, which took a lot of preparation and money to film, an English explorer climbs a holy mountain to ask a guru the meaning of life. Upon opening a Wonka Bar and finding no Golden Ticket, the guru says, "Life is a disappointment." Stuart loved the scene, but few laughed. He invited a psychologist friend to a preview, where the audience reaction was again muted. The psychologist told him, "You don't understand, Mel. For a great many people, life is a disappointment."

When interviewed for the 30th anniversary special edition in 2001, Wilder stated that he enjoyed working with most of the child actors, but said that he and the film crew had some problems with Themmen. Wilder recalled, "Oh, he was a little brat!" He then addressed Themmen directly, "Now if you're watching this, you know that I love you now, but you were a troublemaker then." (Note: Being "a handful" was Themmen's recollection of this remark.) An example of Themmen's misbehaviour was releasing bees from a beehive on Wonka's three-course gum machine. Stuart remembered, "As life mirrored one of the morals of the movie, one of the bees stung him."

== Release ==
=== Theatrical ===
Willy Wonka & the Chocolate Factory was released by Paramount Pictures on June 30, 1971. The film was not a big success, eventually earning $4 million worldwide on a budget of $3 million, and was the 24th highest-grossing film of the year in North America.

For the promotion before its release, the film received advance publicity through TV commercials offering a "Willy Wonka candy factory kit" for sending $1.00 and two seals from boxes of Quaker cereals such as King Vitaman, Life and any of the Cap'n Crunch brands.

=== Television ===
The film made its television debut on Thanksgiving night, November 28, 1974, on NBC. The film was repeated the following year on November 23, 1975, on NBC. There was some controversy with the broadcast, as a football game between the Oakland Raiders and Washington Redskins went into overtime, and the first 40 minutes of the film were cut. The film placed 19th in the television ratings for the week ending November 23, beating out The Streets of San Francisco and Little House on the Prairie. The next television showing of the film was on May 2, 1976, when it placed 46th in the ratings. Some television listings indicate the showing was part of The Wonderful World of Disney time slot.

=== Home media ===
In December 1984, the film became available on VHS and Betamax in the United Kingdom and was released in the United States on VHS the same year.

In 1996, the film was released on LaserDisc as a "25th anniversary edition". Additional features included the original and reissue theatrical trailers and music minus vocals for "sing-alongs". Notes explain the letterboxed version as "presented in a "matted" widescreen format preserving the 1.85:1 aspect ratio of its original theatrical presentation. The black bars at the top and bottom of the screen are normal for this format". VHS copies were also available, but only containing the "standard" full screen version. The "standard" version is an open matte print, in which the mattes used to make the image "widescreen" are removed, revealing more picture at the top and bottom that was masked off from viewers.

In 1997, the film was first released on DVD in a "25th anniversary edition" as a double sided disc containing a "widescreen" and "standard" version. On August 28, 2001, a remastered special edition DVD was released, celebrating the film's 30th anniversary, but in "standard" full screen only. Because there was no "widescreen" release, fans' petitions eventually led Warner Home Video to issue a letterboxed version on November 13, 2001. Several original cast members reunited to film a "making-of" documentary titled Pure Imagination: The Story of 'Willy Wonka and the Chocolate Factory'. The two format editions featured restored sound and better picture quality. In addition to the Pure Imagination feature, the DVD included a trailer, a gallery and audio commentary by the cast. It was also released on VHS, with only one of the special features (the Pure Imagination documentary).

In 2007, Warner Home Video released the film on HD DVD with all the bonus features from the 2001 DVD. On October 20, 2009, the film was released on Blu-ray. It included all the bonus features from the 2001 DVD and 2007 HD DVD as well as a 38-page book. On November 1, 2011, a deluxe edition set was released for the film's 40th anniversary. The set included the film on Blu-ray and DVD, a bonus disc and a number of collectible items, including a Wonka Bar tin, four scented pencils, a scented eraser, a book about the making of the film, original production notes, and a "Golden Ticket" for the chance to win a trip to Los Angeles.

On June 29, 2021, a 4K Blu-ray was released by Warner Bros. Home Entertainment to coincide with the film's 50th anniversary. This edition restored the original Paramount logo at the beginning of the film, but the Warner Bros. end card still remained from previous releases. The film was also available to stream and download digitally in 4K high definition, including standard definition, on devices from various online video platforms.

== Reception ==
=== Critical response ===
Roger Ebert gave the film four out of four stars, calling it:

Probably the best film of its sort since The Wizard of Oz. It is everything that family movies usually claim to be, but aren't: Delightful, funny, scary, exciting, and most of all, a genuine work of imagination. Willy Wonka is such a surely and wonderfully spun fantasy that it works on all kinds of minds, and it is fascinating because, like all classic fantasy, it is fascinated with itself.

Charles Champlin of the Los Angeles Times praised the film as "lively and enjoyable" and called Wilder's performance "a real star turn", but thought the songs were "instantly forgettable" and that the factory looked "a lot more literal and industrial and less empathic than it might have". Variety called the film "an okay family musical fantasy" that had "good" performances but lacked any tunes that were "especially rousing or memorable". Howard Thompson of The New York Times panned it as "tedious and stagy with little sparkle and precious little humor". Gene Siskel gave the film two stars out of four, writing, "Anticipation of what Wonka's factory is like is so well developed that its eventual appearance is a terrible letdown. Sure enough there is a chocolate river, but it looks too much like the Chicago River to be appealing. The quality of the color photography is flat. The other items in Wonka's factory—bubblegum trees and lollypop flowers—also look cheap. Nothing in the factory is appealing." Jan Dawson of The Monthly Film Bulletin wrote that after a slow start the second half of the film was "an unqualified delight—one of those rare, genuinely imaginative children's entertainments at which no adult need be embarrassed to be seen".

On review aggregator website Rotten Tomatoes, the film has an 84% approval rating and an average rating of 8/10 based on 124 reviews. The site's critical consensus states: "Whimsically inventive and imaginative, Willy Wonka & the Chocolate Factory serves up a scrumdiddlyumptious children's fantasy packed with memorable songs, droll satire, and a charmingly unpredictable Gene Wilder." Metacritic, which uses a weighted average, assigned the film a score of 67 out of 100, based on 10 critics, indicating "generally favorable" reviews.

=== Roald Dahl's reaction ===
Dahl disowned the film and was "infuriated" by the plot deviations and considered the music to be "saccharine, sappy and sentimental". He was also disappointed because the film "placed too much emphasis on Willy Wonka and not enough on Charlie" and because Wilder was cast as Wonka instead of Spike Milligan. In 1996, Dahl's second wife, Felicity, commented on her husband's objections toward film adaptations of his works, saying, "They always want to change a book's storyline. What makes Hollywood think children want the endings changed for a film, when they accept it in a book?"

== Legacy ==
Willy Wonka & the Chocolate Factory remained in obscurity in the years immediately following its original release. When the distribution rights lapsed in 1977, Paramount declined to renew, considering it not viable. The rights defaulted back to the Quaker Oats Company, which was no longer involved in the film business, and therefore sold them to Warner Bros. for $500,000. Wolper engineered the rights sale to Warner Bros., where he became a corporate director after selling his production company to it the previous year.

By the 1980s, the film had experienced an increase in popularity due to repeated television broadcasts; it also gained cult status with a new audience in home video sales. In 1996, there was a 25th anniversary theatrical re-release which grossed the film a further $21 million. In 2003, Entertainment Weekly ranked it 25th in the "Top 50 Cult Movies" of all time. The tunnel scene during the boat ride has been cited as one of the scariest in a film for children, for its surreal visuals, and was ranked No. 74 on Bravo's The 100 Scariest Movie Moments. The scene has also been interpreted as a psychedelic trip, though director Stuart denied that was his intention.

In 2014, the film was selected for preservation in the United States National Film Registry by the Library of Congress as being "culturally, historically, or aesthetically significant".

=== Awards and nominations ===
| Award | Category | Nominee(s) | Result | Ref(s). |
|---|---|---|---|---|
| Academy Awards | Best Music: Scoring Adaptation and Original Song Score | Adapted by Walter Scharf; Song Score by Leslie Bricusse and Anthony Newley | Nominated | |
| Golden Globe Awards | Best Actor in a Motion Picture – Musical or Comedy | Gene Wilder | Nominated | |
| National Film Preservation Board | National Film Registry | | Inducted | |
| Online Film & Television Association Awards | Hall of Fame – Motion Picture | | Won | |
| Saturn Awards | Best DVD or Blu-ray Special Edition Release | The 40th Anniversary Collectors Edition | Nominated | |

== Music ==
Willy Wonka & the Chocolate Factory (Music From the Original Soundtrack of the Paramount Picture)

Soundtrack album by Leslie Bricusse and Anthony Newley
- Released: 1971
- Genres: Musical; film score
- Length: 36:28
- Label: Paramount Records
- Producer: Tom Mack

Roald Dahl's Charlie and the Chocolate Factory chronology
| Willy Wonka & the Chocolate Factory (Music From the Original Soundtrack of the Paramount Picture) (1971) | Charlie and the Chocolate Factory (2005) |

The original score and songs were composed by Leslie Bricusse and Anthony Newley, and musical direction was by Walter Scharf. The soundtrack was first released by Paramount Records in 1971.

Sammy Davis Jr. recorded the song "The Candy Man", which became his only number-one hit. It spent three weeks at the top of the Billboard Hot 100 chart starting June 10, 1972 and two weeks at the top of the easy-listening chart.

On October 8, 1996, Hip-O Records (in conjunction with MCA Records, which owned the Paramount catalog by then), released the soundtrack on CD as a 25th Anniversary Edition. In 2016, UMe and Geffen Records released a 45th Anniversary Edition LP.

=== Track listing ===
All lyrics are written by Leslie Bricusse; all music is composed by Anthony Newley.

Side A
| No. | Title | Artist(s) | Length |
|---|---|---|---|
| 1. | "Main Title (Golden Ticket / Pure Imagination)" | | 2:07 |
| 2. | "The Candy Man" | Aubrey Woods | 2:31 |
| 3. | "Charlie's Paper Run (Note: Features dialogue by Peter Capell)" | | 1:09 |
| 4. | "Cheer Up, Charlie" | Diana Sowle | 2:39 |
| 5. | "Lucky Charlie" | | 2:06 |
| 6. | "(I've Got a) Golden Ticket" | Jack Albertson and Peter Ostrum | 3:09 |
| 7. | "Pure Imagination" | Gene Wilder | 4:20 |

Side B
| No. | Title | Artist(s) | Length |
|---|---|---|---|
| 1. | "Oompa Loompa Doompa-Dee-Do" | | 0:57 |
| 2. | "The Wondrous Boat Ride" | Gene Wilder and Roy Kinnear | 3:32 |
| 3. | "Everlasting Gobstoppers / Oompa Loompa (Note: Features dialogue by Denise Nickerson and Gene Wilder)" | | 3:17 |
| 4. | "The Bubble Machine (Note: Features dialogue by Jack Albertson and Peter Ostrum)" | | 2:56 |
| 5. | "I Want It Now / Oompa Loompa" | Julie Dawn Cole and Roy Kinnear | 2:49 |
| 6. | "Wonkamobile, Wonkavision / Oompa Loompa (Note: Features dialogue by Gene Wilder, Paris Themmen and Dodo Denney)" | | 1:48 |
| 7. | "Wonkavator / End Title (Pure Imagination) (Note: Features dialogue by Gene Wilder)" | | 3:08 |

== In popular culture ==
Various comedy television series have referenced the film, mainly as a parody. They include Malcolm in the Middle, My Wife and Kids, the American version of The Office, Saturday Night Live and That '70s Show. Animated television series have also done parodies respectively, Dexter's Laboratory ("Golden Diskette" in 1997); The Simpsons (season 9's "Trash of the Titans" in 1998 and season 20's "Eeny Teeny Maya Moe" in 2009); Futurama (season 1's "Fry and the Slurm Factory" in 1999); Family Guy (season 2's "Wasted Talent" in 2000); Hi Hi Puffy AmiYumi ("Taffy Trouble" in 2004); South Park (season 11's "Le Petit Tourette" in 2007); Rick and Morty (season 3's "Tales from the Citadel" in 2017); and American Dad! (season 16's "Jeff and the Dank Ass Weed Factory" in 2019).

Marilyn Manson's 1995 music video for their song "Dope Hat" was influenced by the boat ride scene. In 2001, the music video of Alien Ant Farm's song "Movies" paid homage to various Hollywood films and included a scene in which the band members were dressed as Oompa-Loompas. In 2014, the American experimental rock band Primus released the album Primus & the Chocolate Factory with the Fungi Ensemble. The album features a re-imagined version of the film's soundtrack and songs.

In the 2010s, a still from the movie became a popular Internet meme known as Condescending Wonka. In 2017, in an episode of the TV series Pawn Stars a combination of the original Everlasting Gobstopper and Wonka Bar props sold for $105,000, and a 2017 animated adaptation of the film with Tom and Jerry was released as Tom and Jerry: Willy Wonka and the Chocolate Factory. In 2023, elements from the film, including the Oompa-Loompa design and the song "Pure Imagination", were used in a "spiritual prequel to the 1971 classic," Wonka.

== See also ==
- List of American films of 1971
- List of films featuring miniature people

== Sources ==
- Stuart, Mel; Young, Josh (2002). Pure Imagination: The Making of Willy Wonka and the Chocolate Factory. New York: St. Martin's Press. ISBN 978-0-312-35240-0. Archived from the original on November 18, 2020.
