= The Thin Blue Line (1966 film) =

1966 American documentary by William Friedkin

- Directed by: William Friedkin
- Narrated by: Van Heflin
- Country of origin: United States
- Original language: English

Production
- Producer: David L. Wolper
- Running time: 52 minutes

Original release
- Network: ABC
- Release: 1966

The Thin Blue Line is a 1966 documentary film directed by William Friedkin. It was the second of three documentaries Friedkin made for producer David Wolper. It focuses on the police force, and the experience making it later influenced Friedkin while working on The French Connection.

== See also ==
- List of American films of 1966
