= Madeline Stuart (designer) =

American interior designer

Madeline Stuart is an American Elle Decor A-List and Architectural Digest "AD100" interior and furniture designer. She is based in Los Angeles, CA. Several publications have featured her work, including Galerie Magazine's inclusion of a Southern California home that displays modern art and a feature in Veranda displaying a restored home originally built by Cedric Gibbons for his wife, the actress Dolores del Río. She is the author of No Place Like Home: Interiors by Madeline Stuart published by Rizzoli in 2019.

Stuart is the daughter of the firm director and producer Mel Stuart. She appeared, uncredited, in his 1971 movie Willy Wonka & the Chocolate Factory.
