= The Race for Space (film) =

1959 film

- Film poster
- Directed by: David L. Wolper
- Written by: Laurence E. Mascott; David L. Wolper
- Produced by: Jack Haley Jr.; David L. Wolper
- Narrated by: Mike Wallace
- Cinematography: Michael Nebbia; Jerry Reeves
- Edited by: Philip R. Rosenberg
- Music by: Elmer Bernstein
- Production company: Wolper Inc.
- Distributed by: Universal Pictures
- Release date: 1959
- Running time: 55 minutes
- Country: United States
- Language: English

The Race for Space is a 1959 American documentary film directed by David L. Wolper. It was nominated for an Academy Award for Best Documentary Feature. The film was a coproduction between Wolper Productions, the U.S. Department of Defense, and the U.S.S.R. Ministry of Culture.

== Cast ==
- Esther Goddard as herself - Interviewee
- Holger N. Toftoy as himself - Interviewee
- Mike Wallace as narrator
