= William Friedkin =

American director and producer (1935–2023)

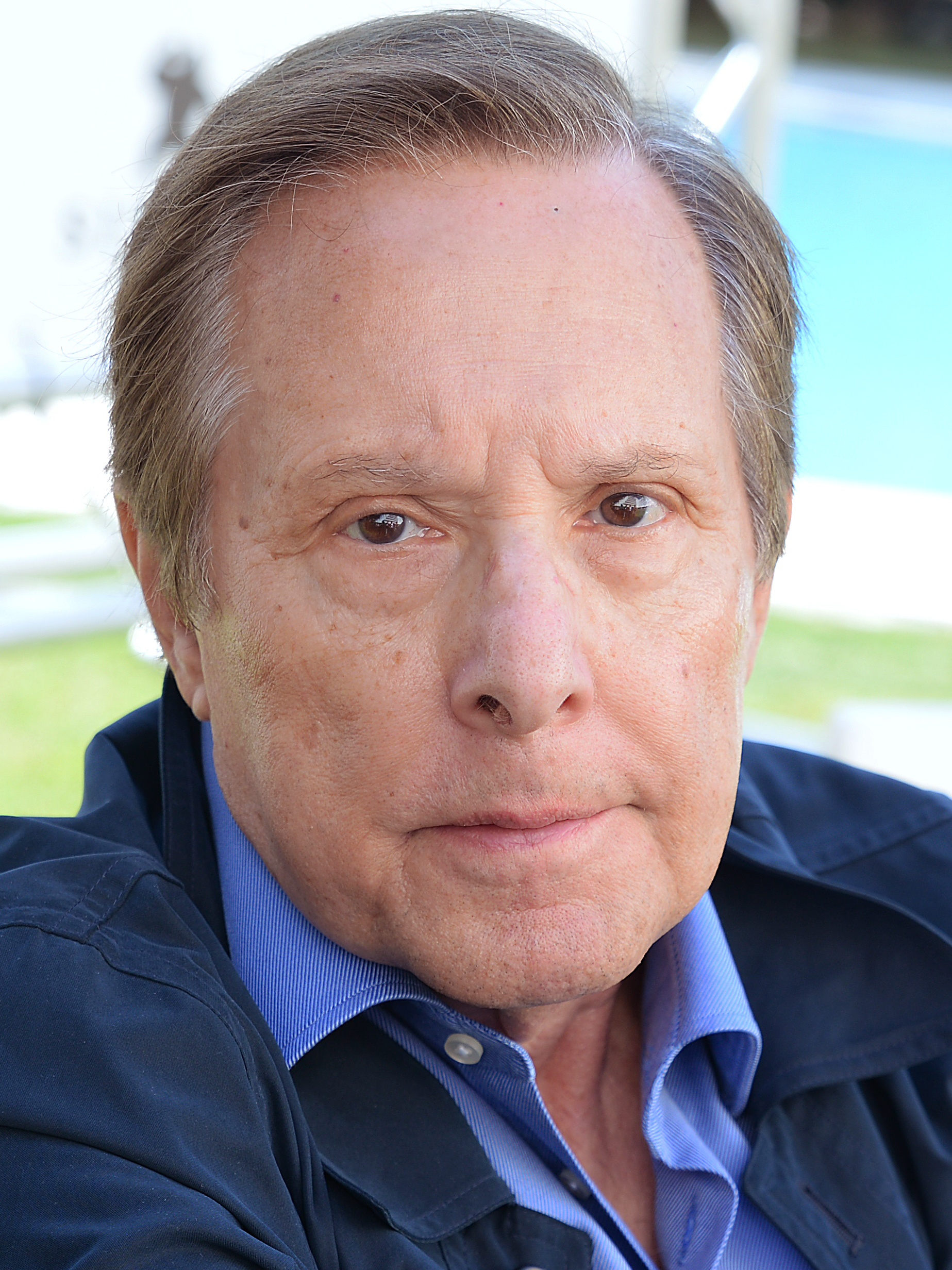
- Friedkin in 2017
- Born: William David Friedkin; August 29, 1935; Chicago, Illinois, U.S.
- Died: August 7, 2023 (aged 87); Los Angeles, California, U.S.
- Occupations: Director; producer; screenwriter
- Years active: 1962–2023
- Spouses: Jeanne Moreau (m. 1977; div. 1979); Lesley-Anne Down (m. 1982; div. 1985); Kelly Lange (m. 1987; div. 1990); Sherry Lansing (m. 1991)
- Children: 2

William David Friedkin (/ˈfriːdkɪn/; August 29, 1935 – August 7, 2023) was an American director, producer, and screenwriter who was closely identified with the New Hollywood movement of the 1970s. Beginning his career in documentaries in the early 1960s, he is best known for his crime thriller film The French Connection (1971), which won five Academy Awards, including Best Picture and Best Director, and the horror film The Exorcist (1973), which earned him another Academy Award nomination for Best Director.

Friedkin's other films in the 1970s and 1980s include the drama The Boys in the Band (1970), considered a milestone of queer cinema; the originally criticized, now lauded thriller Sorcerer (1977); the crime comedy drama The Brink's Job (1978); the controversial thriller Cruising (1980); and the neo-noir thriller To Live and Die in L.A. (1985). Although Friedkin's works suffered an overall commercial and critical decline in the late 1980s, his last three feature films, all based on plays, were positively received by critics: the psychological horror film Bug (2006), the crime film Killer Joe (2011), and the legal drama film The Caine Mutiny Court-Martial (2023), released two months after his death. He also worked extensively as an opera director from 1998 until his death, and directed various television films and series episodes for television.

== Early life and education ==
Friedkin was born in Chicago, Illinois, on August 29, 1935, the son of Rachael (née Green) and Louis Friedkin. His father was a semi-professional softball player, merchant seaman, and men's clothing salesman. His mother, whom Friedkin called "a saint," was a nurse. His parents were Jewish emigrants from Ukraine, in the Russian empire. His grandparents, parents, and other relatives fled Russia during a particularly violent anti-Jewish pogrom in 1903. Friedkin's father was somewhat uninterested in making money, and the family was generally lower middle class while he was growing up. According to film historian Peter Biskind, "Friedkin viewed his father with a mixture of affection and contempt for not making more of himself."

After attending public schools in Chicago, Friedkin enrolled at Senn High School, where he played basketball well enough to consider turning professional. He was not a serious student and barely received grades good enough to graduate, which he did at the age of 16. He said this was because of social promotion and not because he was bright.

Friedkin began going to movies as a teenager, and cited Citizen Kane as one of his key influences. Several sources claim that Friedkin saw this motion picture as a teenager, but Friedkin himself said that he did not see the film until 1960, when he was 25 years old. Only then, Friedkin said, did he become a true cineaste. Among the movies that he also saw as a teenager and young adult were Les Diaboliques, The Wages of Fear (which he remade as Sorcerer), and Psycho (which he viewed repeatedly, like Citizen Kane). Televised documentaries such as 1960's Harvest of Shame were also important to his developing sense of cinema.

Friedkin began working in the mail room at WBKB-TV immediately after high school. Within two years (at the age of 18), he started his directorial career doing live television shows and documentaries. His efforts included The People vs. Paul Crump (1962), which won an award at the San Francisco International Film Festival and contributed to the commutation of Crump's death sentence. Its success helped Friedkin get a job with producer David L. Wolper. He also made the football-themed documentary Mayhem on a Sunday Afternoon (1965).

== Career ==
=== 1965–1979 ===
As mentioned in his voice-over commentary on the DVD re-release of Alfred Hitchcock's Vertigo, Friedkin directed one of the last episodes of The Alfred Hitchcock Hour in 1965, called "Off Season". Hitchcock admonished Friedkin for not wearing a tie while directing.

In 1965, Friedkin moved to Hollywood and two years later released his first feature film, Good Times starring Sonny and Cher. He has referred to the film as "unwatchable". Several other films followed: The Birthday Party, based on an unpublished screenplay by Harold Pinter, which he adapted from his own play; the musical comedy The Night They Raided Minsky's, starring Jason Robards and Britt Ekland; and the adaptation of Mart Crowley's play The Boys in the Band.

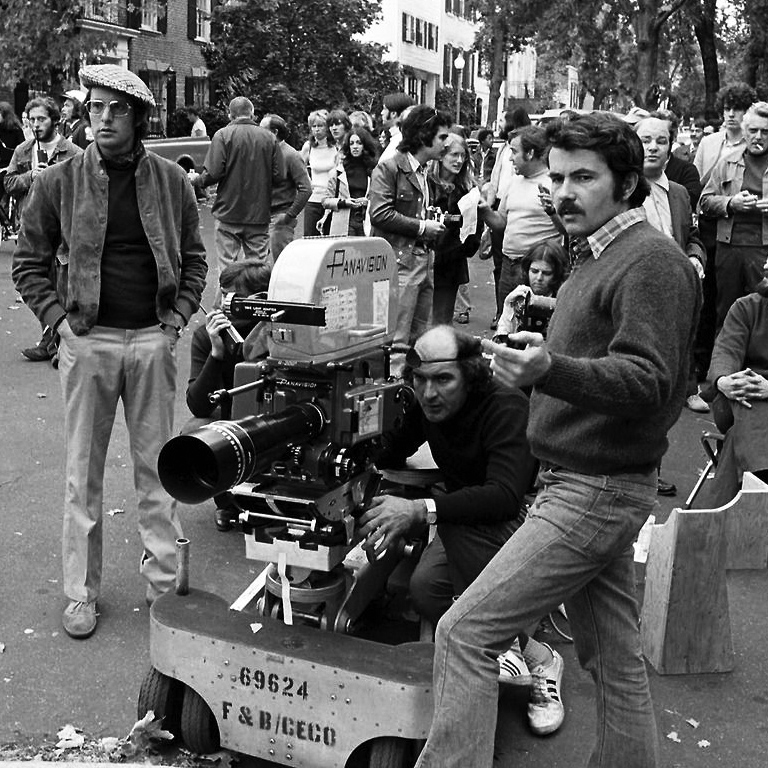
From left: Friedkin, Owen Roizman and William Peter Blatty on set of The Exorcist

His next film, The French Connection, was released to wide critical acclaim in 1971. Shot in a gritty style more suited for documentaries than Hollywood features, the film won five Academy Awards, including Best Picture and Best Director.

In 1973 Friedkin directed The Exorcist, based on William Peter Blatty's best-selling novel, which revolutionized the horror genre and is considered by some critics to be one of the greatest horror movies of all time. The Exorcist was nominated for 10 Academy Awards, including Best Picture and Best Director. It won for Best Screenplay and Best Sound. Following these two pictures, Friedkin, along with Francis Ford Coppola and Peter Bogdanovich, was deemed one of the premier directors of New Hollywood. In 1973, the trio announced the formation of an independent production company at Paramount Pictures, The Directors Company. Whereas Coppola directed The Conversation and Bogdanovich, the Henry James adaptation, Daisy Miller, Friedkin abruptly left the company, which was soon closed by Paramount.

Friedkin's later movies did not achieve the same success. Sorcerer (1977), a $22 million American remake of the French classic The Wages of Fear, co-produced by both Universal and Paramount, starring Roy Scheider, was overshadowed by the blockbuster box-office success of Star Wars, which had been released exactly one week prior. Friedkin considered it his finest film, and was personally devastated by its financial and critical failure (as mentioned by Friedkin himself in the 1999 documentary series The Directors). Sorcerer was shortly followed by the crime-comedy The Brink's Job (1978), based on the real-life Great Brink's Robbery in Boston, Massachusetts, which was also unsuccessful at the box-office.

=== 1980–1999 ===
In 1980, Friedkin directed an adaptation of the Gerald Walker crime thriller Cruising, starring Al Pacino, which was protested during production and remains the subject of heated debate. It was critically assailed but performed moderately at the box office.

Friedkin had a heart attack on March 6, 1981, due to a genetic defect in his circumflex left coronary artery, and nearly died. He spent months in rehabilitation. His next picture was 1983's Deal of the Century, a satire about arms dealing starring Chevy Chase, Gregory Hines, and Sigourney Weaver. In 1984, he became one of the first Academy Award-winning directors to direct a music video, directing Laura Branigan's "Self Control."

In 1985, Friedkin directed the music video for Barbra Streisand's rendition of the West Side Story song "Somewhere", which she recorded for her twenty-fourth studio LP, The Broadway Album. He later appears as Streisand's interviewer (uncredited) on the television special, "Putting It Together: The Making of the Broadway Album".

The action/crime movie To Live and Die in L.A. (1985), starring William Petersen and Willem Dafoe, was a critical favorite and drew comparisons to Friedkin's own The French Connection (particularly for its car chase sequence), while his courtroom drama/thriller Rampage (1987) received a fairly positive review from Roger Ebert. He next directed the cult classic horror film The Guardian (1990) and the thriller Jade (1995), starring Linda Fiorentino. Though the latter received an unfavorable response from critics and audiences, he said it was one of the favorite films he directed.

=== 2000–2023 ===
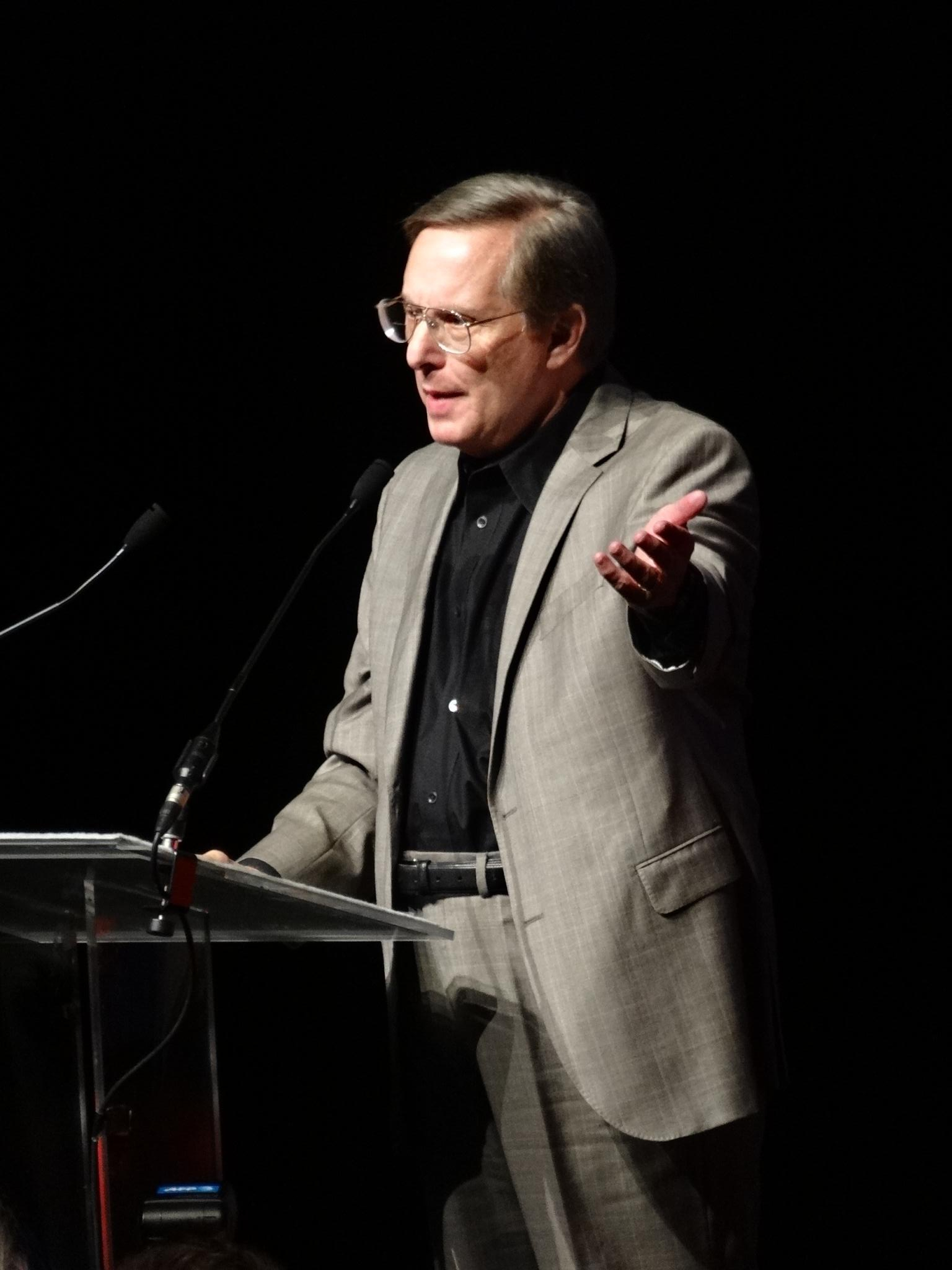
Friedkin at the 2012 Deauville American Film Festival

In 2000, The Exorcist was re-released in theaters with extra footage and grossed $40 million in the U.S. alone. Friedkin directed the 2006 film Bug due to a positive experience watching the stage version in 2004. Friedkin said of his enjoyment of the play: "I was just on the same page with the writer. His worldview was something that I understood, and that doesn't happen to me often". The film won the FIPRESCI prize at the Cannes Film Festival. Later, Friedkin directed an episode of the TV series CSI: Crime Scene Investigation titled "Cockroaches", which re-teamed him with To Live and Die in L.A. star William Petersen. He directed again for CSI's 200th episode, "Mascara".

In 2011, Friedkin directed Killer Joe, a black comedy written by Tracy Letts based on Letts' play, and starring Matthew McConaughey, Emile Hirsch, Juno Temple, Gina Gershon, and Thomas Haden Church. Killer Joe premiered at the 68th Venice International Film Festival, prior to its North American debut at the 2011 Toronto International Film Festival. It opened in U.S. theaters in July 2012, to some favorable reviews from critics but did poorly at the box office, possibly because of its restrictive NC-17 rating. In April 2013, Friedkin published a memoir, The Friedkin Connection. He was presented with a lifetime achievement award at the 70th Venice International Film Festival in September. In 2017, Friedkin directed the documentary The Devil and Father Amorth about the ninth exorcism of a woman in the Italian village of Alatri. In August 2022, it was announced officially that Friedkin would be returning to film directing to helm an adaptation of the two-act play The Caine Mutiny Court-Martial with Kiefer Sutherland starring as Lt. Commander Queeg. The film was completed before Friedkin's death, and debuted in September 2023 in the out-of-competition category at the Venice Film Festival.

== Influences ==
Friedkin cited Jean-Luc Godard, Federico Fellini, François Truffaut, and Akira Kurosawa as influences. Friedkin named Woody Allen as "the greatest living filmmaker".

In regard to influences of specific films on his films, Friedkin noted that The French Connection['s] documentary-like realism was the direct result of the influence of having seen Z, a French film by Costa-Gavras:

After I saw Z, I realized how I could shoot The French Connection. Because he shot Z like a documentary. It was a fiction film but it was made like it was actually happening. Like the camera didn't know what was gonna happen next. And that is an induced technique. It looks like he happened upon the scene and captured what was going on as you do in a documentary. My first films were documentaries too. So I understood what he was doing but I never thought you could do that in a feature at that time until I saw Z.

== Personal life ==
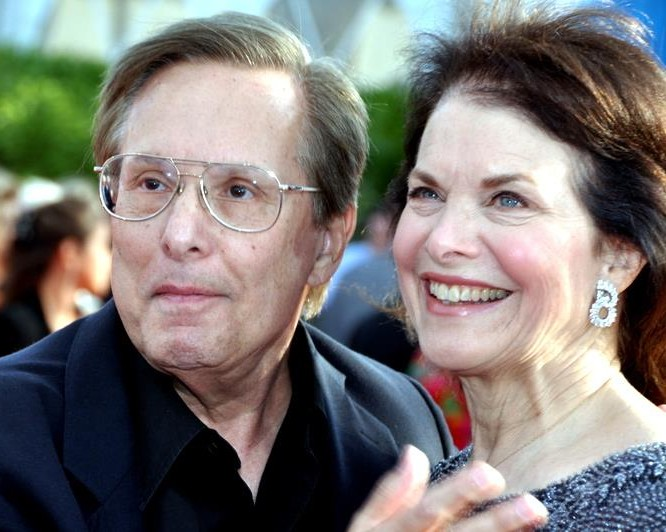
Friedkin with wife Sherry Lansing in 2012

Friedkin was married four times:

- Jeanne Moreau, married February 8, 1977, and divorced in 1979.
- Lesley-Anne Down, married in 1982 and divorced in 1985.
- Kelly Lange, married on June 7, 1987, and divorced in 1990.
- Sherry Lansing, married on July 6, 1991.

While filming The Boys in the Band in 1970, Friedkin began a relationship with Kitty Hawks, daughter of director Howard Hawks. It lasted two years, during which the couple announced their engagement, but the relationship ended about 1972. Friedkin began a four-year relationship with Australian dancer and choreographer Jennifer Nairn-Smith in 1972. Although they announced an engagement twice, they never married. They had a son, Cedric, on November 27, 1976. Friedkin and his second wife, Lesley-Anne Down, also had a son, Jack, born in 1982. Friedkin was raised Jewish, but called himself an agnostic later in life, although he said that he strongly believed in the teachings of Jesus Christ.

== Death ==
Friedkin died from heart failure and pneumonia at his home in the Bel Air neighborhood of Los Angeles on August 7, 2023, aged 87.

== Work ==
=== Film ===
Narrative films

Year	Title	Director	Writer	Producer	Ref(s)
1967	Good Times	Yes	Uncredited	No	
1968	The Birthday Party	Yes	No	No	
1968	The Night They Raided Minsky's	Yes	No	No	
1970	The Boys in the Band	Yes	No	No	
1971	The French Connection	Yes	Uncredited	No	
1973	The Exorcist	Yes	No	No	
1977	Sorcerer	Yes	Uncredited	Yes	
1978	The Brink's Job	Yes	No	No	
1980	Cruising	Yes	Yes	No	
1983	Deal of the Century	Yes	No	No	
1985	To Live and Die in L.A.	Yes	Yes	No	
1987	Rampage	Yes	Yes	Yes	
1990	The Guardian	Yes	Yes	No	
1994	Blue Chips	Yes	No	No	
1995	Jade	Yes	Uncredited	No	
2000	Rules of Engagement	Yes	No	No	
2003	The Hunted	Yes	No	No	
2006	Bug	Yes	No	No	
2011	Killer Joe	Yes	No	No	
2023	The Caine Mutiny Court-Martial	Yes	Yes	No	

Documentary films

Year	Title	Director	Writer	Producer	Ref(s)
1962	The People vs. Paul Crump	Yes	No	Yes	
1965	The Bold Men	Yes	No	No	
1965	Mayhem on a Sunday Afternoon	Yes	No	Yes	
1966	The Thin Blue Line	Yes	Story	Yes	
1975	Fritz Lang Interviewed by William Friedkin	Yes	No	No	
1986	Putting It Together: The Making of the Broadway Album	Uncredited	No	No	
2007	The Painter's Voice	Yes	No	No	
2017	The Devil and Father Amorth	Yes	Yes	No	

=== Television ===
TV series

Year	Title	Episode	Ref(s)
1965	The Alfred Hitchcock Hour	"Off Season" (S3 E29)	
1967	The Pickle Brothers	TV pilot (S1 E1)	
1985	The Twilight Zone	"Nightcrawlers" (S1 E4c)	
1992	Tales from the Crypt	"On a Deadman's Chest" (S4 E3)	
2007	CSI: Crime Scene Investigation	"Cockroaches" (S8 E9)	
2009	CSI: Crime Scene Investigation	"Mascara" (S9 E18)	

TV movies

Year	Title	Director	Writer	Executive producer	Ref(s)
1986	C.A.T. Squad	Yes	No	Yes	
1988	C.A.T. Squad: Python Wolf	Yes	Yes	Yes	
1994	Jailbreakers	Yes	No	No	
1997	12 Angry Men	Yes	No	No	

Music videos

Year	Title	Artist	Ref(s)
1984	"Self Control"	Laura Branigan	
1985	"Somewhere"	Barbra Streisand	
1985	"To Live and Die in L.A."	Wang Chung	
1998	"Ce que je sais"	Johnny Hallyday	

=== Stage ===
Operas

Year	Title and Composer	Country / Opera House	Ref(s)
1998	Wozzeck, Alban Berg	Maggio Musicale Fiorentino Theatre	
2002	Duke Bluebeard's Castle, Béla Bartók	Los Angeles Opera	
2002	Gianni Schicchi, Giacomo Puccini	Los Angeles Opera	
2003	La damnation de Faust, Hector Berlioz	Los Angeles Opera	
2004	Ariadne auf Naxos, Richard Strauss	Los Angeles Opera	
2005	Samson and Delilah, Camille Saint-Saëns	June, New Israeli Opera; October, Los Angeles Opera	
2005	Aida, Giuseppe Verdi	Teatro Regio Torino	
2006	Salome, Richard Strauss	Bavarian State Opera	
2006	Das Gehege, Wolfgang Rihm	Bavarian State Opera	
2008	Il tabarro, Giacomo Puccini	Los Angeles Opera	
2008	Suor Angelica, Giacomo Puccini	Los Angeles Opera	
2011	The Makropulos Case, Leoš Janáček	Maggio Musicale Fiorentino Theatre	
2012	The Tales of Hoffmann, Jacques Offenbach	Theater an der Wien	
2015	Rigoletto, Giuseppe Verdi	Maggio Musicale Fiorentino Theatre	

Plays

Year	Title	Theatre	Principal Cast	Ref(s)
1981	Duet for One	Royale Theatre	Max von Sydow, Anne Bancroft	

=== Unrealized projects ===
Year	Title and description	Ref(s)
1960s	Gunn	
1960s	Chastity	
1960s	They Shoot Horses, Don't They?	
1960s	The Murders on the Moor, a film adaptation of Emlyn Williams' novel Beyond Belief: A Chronicle of Murder and Its Detection	
1970s	A film adaptation of Ross Thomas' novel The Brass Go-Between	
1970s	The Bunker Hill Boys, a film for The Directors Company	
1970s	An untitled sci-fi film with Peter Gabriel	
1970s	The Devil's Triangle, a UFO thriller starring Marlon Brando, Steve McQueen and Charlton Heston	
1970s	A Safe Darkness, a documentary about horror cinema featuring interviews with Fritz Lang and Roman Polanski	
1970s	Born on the Fourth of July starring Al Pacino as Ron Kovic	
1970s	A made-for-television film adaptation of Will Eisner's comic The Spirit written by Harlan Ellison	
1970s	A film adaptation of Harlan Ellison's short story "The Whimper of Whipped Dogs" starring Jeanne Moreau	
1970s	A 10-hour television adaptation of Thomas Thompson's novel Blood and Money	
1970s	A film adaptation of Ron Hansen's novel Desperadoes written by Walon Green	
1980s	A film adaptation of Jerry Hopkins and Danny Sugerman's non-fiction book No One Here Gets Out Alive	
1980s	A film adaptation of Gay Talese's non-fiction book Thy Neighbor's Wife	
1980s	A film adaptation of Robin Cook's novel Brain	
1980s	That Championship Season	
1980s	A film adaptation of William Peter Blatty's novel Legion	
1980s	A film adaptation of Frank De Felitta's novel Sea Trial starring Laura Branigan and Michael Nouri	
1980s	A film adaptation of Bob Fosse and Fred Ebb's stage musical Chicago written by Arthur Laurents	
1980s	Judgement Day, a film written by Pete Hamill starring Gregory Peck	
1980s	A film adaptation of Don Pendleton's The Executioner series written by Hilary Henkin starring Sylvester Stallone and Cynthia Rothrock	
1980s	The Gambler, a film written by Edward Neumeier and Michael Miner starring Sylvester Stallone	
1980s	Desperate Hours	
1980s	An untitled biopic about 1950s songwriting duo Jerry Leiber and Mike Stoller	
1990s	Elsewhere, a ghost story with William Peter Blatty	
1990s	The Diary of Jack the Ripper, a biopic about James Maybrick written by Chris DeVore starring Anthony Hopkins	
1990s	A film adaptation of John Flood's novel Bag Men starring Michael Keaton	
1990s	A film adaptation of Larry Collins' novel O Jerusalem! written by James Dearden	
1990s	A remake of the 1996 made-for-television film Truth or Dare written by William Davies	
1990s	Night Train, a biopic about boxer Sonny Liston written by Shane Salerno and Tyger Williams starring Ving Rhames	
1990s	Battle Grease, a film about the account of the Florence Maybrick murder trial	
1990s	The Man Who Killed Versace, a biopic of Andrew Cunanan written by Frederic Raphael starring Freddie Prinze Jr., Franco Nero and Angelina Jolie	
2000s	An untitled biopic about Giacomo Puccini written by Luciano Vincenzoni starring Plácido Domingo	
2000s	Shooter starring Tommy Lee Jones	
2000s	An untitled biopic about Howard Hughes adapted from Richard Hack's biography Hughes: The Private Diaries, Memos and Letters	
2000s	A film adaptation of Thomas Thompson's novel Serpentine written by Art Monterastelli and Brandon Boyce	
2000s	A film adaptation of Robert Silverberg's novel The Book of Skulls written by Jeff Davis and Terry Hayes	
2000s	The Man Who Kept Secrets, a biopic written by James Ellroy about Hollywood lawyer Sidney Korshak	
2000s	A film adaptation of Chris Greenhalgh's novel Coco and Igor starring Mads Mikkelsen and Marina Hands	
2010s	A film adaptation of William Peter Blatty's novel Dimiter	
2010s	Trapped, an indie thriller set in Europe starring Demián Bichir	(Note: Friedkin said in a 2012 Reddit AMA that he was working on a thriller from an original story of his to be filmed in Europe in January 2013.)
2010s	I Am Wrath starring Nicolas Cage	
2010s	Mae, a biopic about actress Mae West starring Natasha Lyonne and Bette Midler	
2010s	A TV pilot based on his film To Live and Die in L.A. written by Robert Moresco	
2010s	An untitled Killer Joe spinoff TV series written by Robert Moresco starring John Cusack	
2010s	Unspecified episodes of the second season of True Detective	
2010s	A film adaptation of Don Winslow's novel The Winter of Frankie Machine	

An LA Opera production of Wagner's Tannhäuser was announced by Friedkin, but a spokesperson revealed it had been delayed indefinitely. Friedkin had also been set to direct the premiere of an opera titled An Inconvenient Truth to debut in 2011, but he later departed from it when creative differences arose between him and the librettist. In 2013, it was reported that he would helm a stage production of Harold Pinter's The Birthday Party (which he had already directed as a feature film in 1968), for Geffen Playhouse. A cast including Katie Amess, Frances Barber, Steven Berkoff, Tim Roth and Nick Ullett was assembled, but the production was soon postponed for an unknown reason, and never revived.

== Awards and nominations ==
Year	Award	Category	Title	Result	Ref(s)
1972	Academy Award	Best Director	The French Connection	Won	
1972	Directors Guild of America	Outstanding Directorial Achievement in Motion Pictures	The French Connection	Won	
1972	Golden Globes	Best Director	The French Connection	Won	
1973	BAFTA Award	Best Direction	The French Connection	Nominated	
1974	Academy Award	Best Director	The Exorcist	Nominated	
1974	Directors Guild of America	Outstanding Directorial Achievement in Motion Pictures	The Exorcist	Nominated	
1974	Golden Globes	Best Director	The Exorcist	Won	
1981	Razzie Awards	Worst Director	Cruising	Nominated	
1981	Razzie Awards	Worst Screenplay	Cruising	Nominated	
1986	Cognac Festival du Film Policier	Audience Award	To Live and Die in L.A.	Won	
1988	Deauville Film Festival	Critics Award	Rampage	Nominated	
1991	Saturn Award	George Pal Memorial Award		Won	
1993	Saturn Award	Best Director	Rampage	Nominated	
1998	Directors Guild of America	Outstanding Directorial Achievement in Dramatic Specials	12 Angry Men	Nominated	
1998	Primetime Emmy Awards	Outstanding Directing for a Miniseries or a Movie	12 Angry Men	Nominated	
1999	Saturn Award	President's Award		Won	
1999	Empire Awards	Movie Masterpiece Award	The Exorcist	Won	
2000	Palm Beach International Film Festival	Lifetime Achievement Award		Won	
2006	Cannes Film Festival	FIPRESCI	Bug	Won	
2007	Munich Film Festival	CineMerit Award		Won	
2007	Sitges - Catalan International Film Festival	Time-Machine Honorary Award		Won	
2009	Locarno International Film Festival	Leopard of Honor		Won	
2011	Venice Film Festival	Golden Lion	Killer Joe	Nominated	
2011	Venice Film Festival	Golden Mouse	Killer Joe	Won	
2013	Belgian Film Critics Association	Grand Prix	Killer Joe	Nominated	
2013	Saturn Award	Best Director	Killer Joe	Nominated	
2013	Saturn Award	Lifetime Award		Won	
2013	Venice Film Festival	Special Lion for Lifetime Achievement		Won	

Accolades for Friedkin's films
Year	Title	Academy Awards		BAFTAs		Golden Globes	
Year	Title	Nominations	Wins	Nominations	Wins	Nominations	Wins
1970	The Boys in the Band					1	
1971	The French Connection	8	5	5	2	4	3
1973	The Exorcist	10	2	1		7	4
1977	Sorcerer	1					
1978	The Brink's Job	1					
1997	12 Angry Men					3	1
Total		20	7	6	2	15	8

Directed Academy Award Performances

Year	Performer	Film	Result
Academy Award for Best Actor
1972	Gene Hackman	The French Connection	Won
Academy Award for Best Actress
1974	Ellen Burstyn	The Exorcist	Nominated
Academy Award for Best Supporting Actor
1972	Roy Scheider	The French Connection	Nominated
1974	Jason Miller	The Exorcist	Nominated
Academy Award for Best Supporting Actress
1974	Linda Blair	The Exorcist	Nominated

== Bibliography ==
- Friedkin, William. The Friedkin Connection: A Memoir. New York: HarperCollins, 2013. ISBN 978-0-06-177512-3
- Friedkin, William. Conversations at the American Film Institute With the Great Moviemakers: The Next Generation. George Stevens Jr., ed. New York: Alfred A. Knopf, 2012. ISBN 978-0-307-27347-5
