= Running on the Sun: The Badwater 135 =

2000 film by Mel Stuart

- Directed by: Mel Stuart
- Distributed by: Galaxy Entertainment
- Release date: August 4, 2000 (US)
- Language: English

Running on the Sun: The Badwater 135 is a 2000 documentary film directed by Mel Stuart. The film follows athletes as they run 135 miles in the 1999 Badwater Ultramarathon, starting in California's Death Valley and ending at Whitney Portal, the trailhead to Mount Whitney.

The winner for the 1999 race was Eric Clifton with a time of 27 hours and 49 minutes, beating the previous year winner, Gabriel Flores.
