= Diana Sowle =

American actress (1930–2018)

- Sowle in Willy Wonka & the Chocolate Factory (1971)
- Born: Diana Mae Laumer; June 19, 1930; Chico, California, U.S.
- Died: October 19, 2018 (aged 88); Laurel, Maryland, U.S.
- Resting place: Arlington National Cemetery
- Occupation: Actress
- Years active: 1971–2013
- Spouses: Robert K. Gibson (m. 1956; div. 1961) William David Sowle (died 2013)
- Children: 2

Diana Mae Sowle (née Laumer; June 19, 1930 – October 19, 2018) was an American actress. She was best known for her role as Charlie Bucket's mother in the 1971 film Willy Wonka & the Chocolate Factory.

== Early life ==
The daughter of Gerald Kent Laumer and his wife Gladys Marie Laumer, Diana Mae Laumer was born in Chico, California on June 19, 1930. Her father was a civilian employee of the United States Department of Defense. She was one of five siblings, and attended middle school at Central School in Chico where she graduated in 1944. In 1941, at the age of 10, she performed in the Betty Osborn Dance Revue at the Senator Theatre in Chico.

She attended Chico High School, and appeared in school plays, where she became interested in drama. Sowle graduated in 1949 and attended the University of Denver, after which she appeared in the play "The Drunkard". Sowle did voice-over for American plays and appeared in theater in Germany.

== Career ==
=== Film roles ===
Sowle is best known for playing Mrs. Bucket, Charlie Bucket's mother, in the 1971 film Willy Wonka & the Chocolate Factory and her performance of "Cheer Up Charlie" in that film, although her singing voice was dubbed by Diana Lee. Sowle joined the cast in Germany, where it was filmed. Apart from Chocolate Factory, her only other screen roles were cameos in Clear and Present Danger and Guarding Tess, both in 1994.

=== Video game ===
Sowle also gave voice to "Agatha" and other characters in the 2008 video game Fallout 3.

=== Theatre ===
Sowle frequently performed in the long-running play Shear Madness at the Kennedy Center, portraying socialite Eleanor Shubert. Her last-known appearance was in May–June 2013. In mid-2012, Sowle appeared in a production of Love Letters, opposite actor Larry Storch in Farmville, Virginia, to benefit the Tom Mix Rangers.

== Personal life ==
Sowle lived in Germany for about 20 years starting in 1960 and had other homes, including one in Maryland (in the Washington, D.C., area). She was a mother of two and grandmother of four. Sowle's husband, Bill, worked for the CIA and died in 2013. Sowle ran a free tutoring program for underprivileged children in Washington D.C. for almost 25 years.

== Death ==
Sowle died of natural causes on October 19, 2018, at the age of 88. She was interred at Arlington National Cemetery.

== Filmography ==
=== Film ===
Year	Title	Role	Notes
1971	Willy Wonka & the Chocolate Factory	Mrs. Bucket	
1994	Guarding Tess	Hairdresser	
1994	Clear and Present Danger	Cartel Maid	Final film role

=== Television ===
Year	Title	Notes
2003	After They Were Famous	1 episode, Archive footage

=== Video games ===
Year	Title	Role	Notes
2008	Fallout 3	Old Lady Palmer / Agatha / Margaret Primrose / Manya Vargas / Bloomseer Poplar / Tiffany Cheng / Leaf Mother Laurel / Old Lady Dithers / Mother Maya	Voice
