= Mel Stuart =

American film director and producer (1928–2012)

- Mel Stuart, with the Oompa Loompa actors, in 1970
- Born: Stuart Solomon; September 2, 1928; New York City, U.S.
- Died: August 9, 2012 (aged 83); Beverly Hills, California, U.S.
- Occupations: Film director, producer
- Years active: 1963–2000
- Spouses: Harriet Rosalind (m. 1956; div. 1979) Roberta Silberman (m. 1985; died 2011)
- Children: 3, including Madeline Stuart

Mel Stuart (born Stuart Solomon; September 2, 1928 – August 9, 2012) was an American film director and producer who often worked with producer David L. Wolper, at whose production firm he worked for 17 years, before going freelance.

== Early life ==
Stuart, born Stuart Solomon, was of Jewish background.

== Career ==
Stuart directed the fantasy-musical Willy Wonka & the Chocolate Factory (1971). He directed other features, including If It's Tuesday, This Must Be Belgium (1969), One Is a Lonely Number (1972) and Running on the Sun: The Badwater 135 (2000).

Stuart also directed feature documentaries including the 1964 Oscar-nominated John F. Kennedy documentary Four Days in November and the 1973 concert film Wattstax.

In addition he directed or produced over 180 films including movies of the week The Triangle Factory Fire Scandal, Bill, The Chisholms, and Ruby and Oswald, the television series Ripley's Believe It or Not!, and the documentaries The Making of the President 1960, 1964, and 1968, The Hobart Shakespeareans, The Rise and Fall of the Third Reich, Man Ray — The Prophet of the Avant-Garde, George Plimpton and the Philharmonic, and The Poet's View. He was also nominated for the made-for-TV production Bill, starring Mickey Rooney.

== Awards ==
He was awarded an Emmy award, an Academy Award nomination, a Peabody, and numerous other awards. Stuart also served as president of the International Documentary Association for two years.

== Personal life ==
Stuart was born to Edgar and Cecille Solomon, graduated from New York University in 1949, and worked for an advertising company. Stuart married his first wife Harriet Rosalind Dolin on August 12, 1956. They had three children: Madeline, Peter, and Andrew. Madeline and Peter made appearances in Willy Wonka & the Chocolate Factory though only Peter was credited. Stuart and Dolin divorced in 1979. He married his second wife Roberta Silberman in 1985, and they stayed together until her death in 2011.

== Death ==
On August 9, 2012, Stuart died at the age of 83 after suffering from skin cancer at his home in Los Angeles, California. In addition to his three children from his first marriage, Andrew, Madeline, and Peter, Stuart was also survived by two grandchildren, Maximilian Stuart and Eleanor Stuart.

== Selected filmography ==
- Four Days in November (1964)
- If It's Tuesday, This Must Be Belgium (1969)
- I Love My Wife (1970)
- Willy Wonka & the Chocolate Factory (1971)
- One Is a Lonely Number (1972)
- Wattstax (1974)
- Brenda Starr (1976, TV)
- Welcome Back, Kotter (1977, TV)
- Ruby and Oswald (1978, TV)
- Mean Dog Blues (1978)
- The Triangle Factory Fire Scandal (1979, TV)
- The Chisholms (1980, TV)
- Sophia Loren: Her Own Story (1980, TV)
- The White Lions (1981)
