= David L. Wolper =

American television and film producer (1928–2010)

- Born: David Lloyd Wolper; January 11, 1928; New York, New York, U.S.
- Died: August 10, 2010 (aged 82); Beverly Hills, California, U.S.
- Resting place: Forest Lawn Memorial Park, Hollywood Hills, California, U.S.
- Occupations: television and film producer
- Spouse(s): Toni Carroll (m. 1953; div. 1955) Margaret Dawn Richard (m. 1958; div. 1969) Gloria Diane Hill (m. 1974)
- Children: 3

David Lloyd Wolper (January 11, 1928 – August 10, 2010) was an American television and film producer, responsible for shows such as Roots, The Thorn Birds, and North and South, and the theatrically-released films Willy Wonka & the Chocolate Factory (1971) and L.A. Confidential (1997). He was awarded the Jean Hersholt Humanitarian Award at the 57th Academy Awards in 1985 for his work producing the opening and closing ceremonies of the 1984 Summer Olympics in Los Angeles, as well as helping to bring the games there. His 1971 film (as executive producer) about the study of insects, The Hellstrom Chronicle, won an Academy Award.

== Biography ==
Wolper was born in New York City, into an eastern European Jewish family, the son of Anna (née Fass) and Irving S. Wolper. He briefly attended Drake University in Des Moines, Iowa before transferring to the University of Southern California.

Wolper directed the 1959 documentary The Race for Space, which was nominated for an Academy Award, and others including Biography (1961–63), The Making of the President 1960 (1963) and Four Days in November (1964). Wolper then sold his company to Metromedia for $3.6 million in 1964. In October 1968, he paid $750,000 to leave Metromedia and took six film projects with him. The pre-1968 library is owned by Cube Entertainment (formerly International Creative Exchange), while the post-1970 library (along with Wolper's production company, Wolper Productions, now known as The Wolper Organization) has been owned by Warner Bros. Entertainment since November 1976. In 1965, the National Geographic Society formed a 10-year partnership with Wolper Productions where Wolper produced successful television specials for the National Geographic Society across three networks CBS, ABC and PBS.

In 1969, Wolper received the Golden Plate Award of the American Academy of Achievement.

He won an Academy Award for the 1971 film The Hellstrom Chronicle, about the study of insects, which he executive produced. He also produced numerous documentaries and documentary series including The Rise and Fall of the Third Reich (TV) (1968), Appointment With Destiny (1971–73 TV series), Visions of Eight (1973), This Is Elvis (1981), Imagine: John Lennon (1988) and others.

On March 13, 1974, one of his crews filming a National Geographic history of Australopithecus at Mammoth Mountain Ski Area was killed when their Sierra Pacific Airlines Corvair 440 slammed into the White Mountains shortly after takeoff from Eastern Sierra Regional Airport in Bishop, California, killing all 35 on board, including 31 Wolper crew members. The filmed segment was recovered in the wreckage and was broadcast in the television series Primal Man. The cause of the crash remains unsolved.

In 1984, he helped bring the Olympic Games to Los Angeles and produced the opening and closing ceremonies. He was awarded the Jean Hersholt Humanitarian Award at the Academy Awards the following year.

In 1988, Wolper was inducted into the Television Hall of Fame and received the career achievement award from the International Documentary Association. For his work on television, he had received his star on the Hollywood Walk of Fame.

Wolper died on August 10, 2010, of congestive heart disease and complications of Parkinson's disease at his Beverly Hills home. He is buried in Forest Lawn Memorial Park's Hollywood Hills cemetery.

== Productions ==
His company was involved in the following productions. He was a distributor of the early shows, and became an executive producer with The Race for Space in 1958.

Year	Show
1949	Funny Bunnies (36 episodes)
1953	Adventures of Superman (90 episodes)
1954	Baseball Hall of Fame (75 episodes)
1954	O.S.S. (32 episodes)
1954	Grand Ole Opry (39 episodes)
1955	Congressional Investigator (26 episodes)
1958	Men from Boys - The First Eight Weeks
1958	The Race for Space
1959	Project: Man in Space
1960	Hollywood: The Golden Years
1961	Biography of a Rookie: The Willie Davis Story
1961	The Rafer Johnson Story
1962	Hollywood: The Great Stars
1962	Hollywood: The Fabulous Era
1962	D-Day June 6, 1944
1962	Biography
1962–1963	Story of...
1963	Hollywood and the Stars
1963	Escape to Freedom
1963	Kreboizen and Cancer: Thirteen Years of Bitter Conflict
1963	The Passing Years: Rework of Story of a Year 1927
1963	The Making of the President 1960
1963–1964	Specials for United Artists
1964	The Legend of Marilyn Monroe
1964	The Quest for Peace
1964	A Thousand Days: A Tribute to John Fitzgerald Kennedy
1964	Men in Crisis
1964	Four Days in November
1965	France: Conquest to Liberation
1965	Korea: The 38th Parallel
1965	Prelude to War (Beginning of World War II)
1965	Japan: A New Dawn over Asia (Japan in the 20th Century)
1965	007: The Incredible World of James Bond
1965	Let My People Go: The Story of Israel
1965	October Madness: The World Series
1965	Race for the Moon
1965	Miss Television U.S.A.
1965	The Really Big Family: The Duke of Seattle & Their 18 Children
1965	Revolution in Our Time
1965	The Bold Men
1965	The General
1965	The Teenage Revolution
1965	The Way Out Men
1965	In Search of Man
1965	Mayhem on a Sunday Afternoon
1965	Revolution in the 3 R's
1965	The Thin Blue Line
1965	In Search of Man
1965	Silent Partners
1965–1966	The March of Time
1965–1975	National Geographic Society Specials
1966	The Making of the President, 1964
1966	Wall Street Where the Money Is
1966	A Funny Thing Happened on the Way to the White House
1966	Destination Safety
1966	China: Roots of Madness
1966–1968	The World of Animals
1967	The Big Land
1967	A Nation of Immigrants
1967	Untamed World
1967	A Funny Thing Happened on the Way to Hollywood
1967	Movin' with Nancy
1967–1968	Do Blondes Have More Fun?
1967–1968	The Undersea World of Jacques Cousteau
1968	Rise and Fall of the Third Reich
1968	The Dangerous Years
1968	California
1968	With Love, Sophia
1968	Monte Carlo: C'est La Rose
1968	Sophia: A Self Portrait
1968	The Highlights of the Ice Capades 1968
1968	On the Trail of Stanley and Livingstone
1968	Hollywood: The Selznick Years
1968	The Devil's Brigade
1968	The Making of the President, 1968
1969	The Bridge at Remagen
1969	If It's Tuesday, This Must Be Belgium
1969	Los Angeles: Where It's At
1970	The Unfinished Journey of Robert F. Kennedy
1970	I Love My Wife
1970–1972	The Plimpton Specials
1971	Say Goodbye
1971	They've Killed President Lincoln
1971	The Hellstrom Chronicle
1971	Willy Wonka & the Chocolate Factory
1971–1973	Appointment With Destiny
1972	King, Queen, Knave
1972	One Is a Lonely Number
1972	Here Comes Tomorrow: The Fear Fighters
1972	Republican Party Films
1972	Make Mine Red, White and Blue
1972	Top of The Month (3 half-hour specials)
1972	Of Thee I Sing
1972–1973	The Explorers
1973	The 500 Pound Jerk
1973	Wattstax
1973	Visions of Eight
1973–1974	Primal Man Specials
1973–1975	The American Heritage Specials
1974	This Week In The NBA (Series of 20 half-hours)
1974	NBA Game of the Week Featurettes
1974	Get Christie Love!
1974	Judgment Specials
1974	The Morning After
1974	Unwed Father
1974	Men of the Dragon
1974	The First Woman President
1974	Love from A to Z
1974	Birds Do It, Bees Do It
1974	The Animal Within
1974	Yes, Virginia, there is a Santa Claus
1974–1975	Get Christie Love!
1974–1975	Smithsonian Specials
1974–1975	Sandburg's Lincoln
1974–1976	Chico and the Man
1975	Death Stalk
1975	I Will Fight No More Forever
1975–1976	Welcome Back, Kotter
1976	Brenda Starr
1976	Collision Course
1976	Celebration: The American Spirit
1976	The Unexplained
1976	Victory at Entebbe
1976	Mysteries of the Great Pyramids
1977	Roots
1978	Roots: One Year Later
1978	The Little Mermaid (Anderusen dowa: Ningyo hime or Andersen Story: The Mermaid Princess)
1978	Roots: The Next Generations
1980	The Man Who Saw Tomorrow
1980	Moviola
1981	This Is Elvis
1981	Hollywood: The Gift of Laughter
1981	Small World
1981	Murder Is Easy
1982	The Mystic Warrior
1982	Casablanca
1983	The Thorn Birds
1984	XXIIIrd Olympiad, Los Angeles 1984
1984	His Mistress
1985	North and South
1986	North and South: Book II
1986	Liberty Weekend
1987	The Betty Ford Story
1987	Napoleon and Josephine: A Love Story
1988	What Price Victory
1988	Imagine: John Lennon
1988	Roots: The Gift
1989	The Plot to Kill Hitler
1989	Murder in Mississippi
1990	Warner Bros. Celebration of Tradition, June 2, 1990
1990	Dillinger
1990	When You Remember Me
1991	Best of the Worst
1991	Bed of Lies
1992	Celebrations
1992	Fatal Deception: Mrs. Lee Harvey Oswald
1993	Celebration of a Life: Steven J. Ross Chairman of Time Warner
1993	The Flood: Who Will Save Our Children?
1994	Heaven and Hell: North and South Book III
1994	On Trial
1994	Golf - The Greatest Game
1994	Heroes of the Game
1994	Without Warning
1994	Murder in the First
1995	Prince for a Day
1996	The Thorn Birds: The Missing Years
1996	Surviving Picasso
1997	L.A. Confidential
1998	Terror at the Mall
1998	Warner Bros. 75th Anniversary Show
1998	A Will of Their Own
1998	Confirmation
1998	Legends, Icons and Superstars
1999	To Serve and Protect
1999	Celebrate the Century

== See also ==
- Norman Lear
- Aaron Spelling
- Alan Landsburg
