= Hiking equipment =

Equipment taken on outdoor walking trips

Hiking equipment is the equipment taken on outdoor walking trips. The duration, distance, planned activities, and environment impacts equipment selection. For example, a short day hike across flat farmland versus trekking in the Himalayas would call for different types of equipment.

== Planning ==
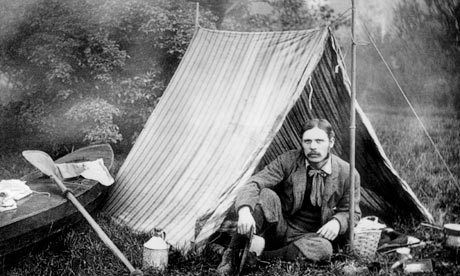
Thomas Hiram Holding with early camping gear

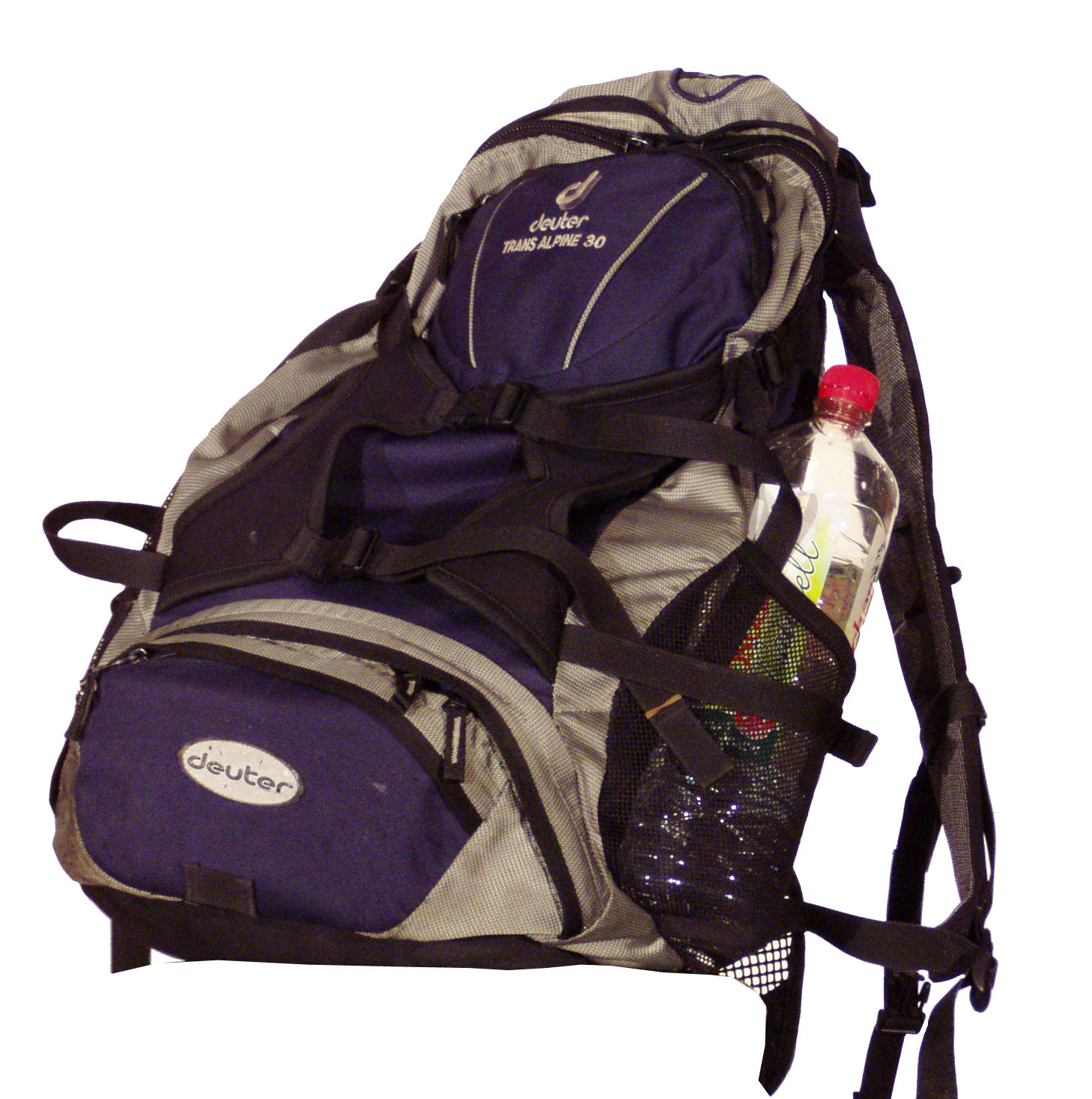
Example of a "day pack" or "ultralight multi-day backpack"

According to Tom Brown, the order of survival is shelter (including clothing), water, fire, and food. Cody Lundin writes about the "Rule of 3s" and states three minutes without air, three hours without shelter, three days without water, or three weeks without food will result in not surviving.

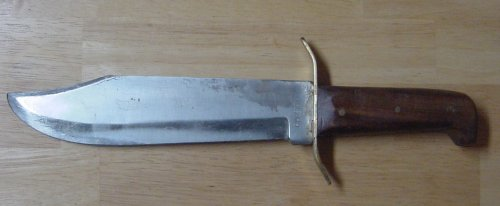
A stout knife example

Considerations for selecting hiking equipment:

- Length and remoteness of trip
- Weight hiker can carry
- Capacity of equipment
- Medical needs
- Weather (e.g., temperature range, sun/shade, rain, snow, ice)
- Terrain (e.g., trail conditions, cliffs, sand, swamp, river crossings)
- Shelter
- Clothes
- Water
- Food
- Protection from animals (e.g., insect repellent, mace, bear spray, bear-resistant food storage container)

The Mountaineers of Seattle later developed the “10 Essentials” while teaching climbing courses in the 1930s, which eventually appeared in Mountaineering: The Freedom of the Hills. This was developed so that outdoor recreationists could respond to an accident or spend an unforeseen night in the wild. Their research included modern equipment as it became available. The Mountaineers of Seattle "10 Essentials" for hiking trips are:

1. Navigation (map, compass)
2. Sun protection (sunglasses, sunscreen)
3. Insulation (extra clothing)
4. Illumination (headlamp, flashlight)
5. First-aid supplies
6. Fire (waterproof matches, lighter, candle)
7. Repair kit
8. Nutrition (extra food)
9. Hydration (extra water)
10. Emergency shelter (tent, plastic tube tent, garbage bag)

== Carrying methods ==
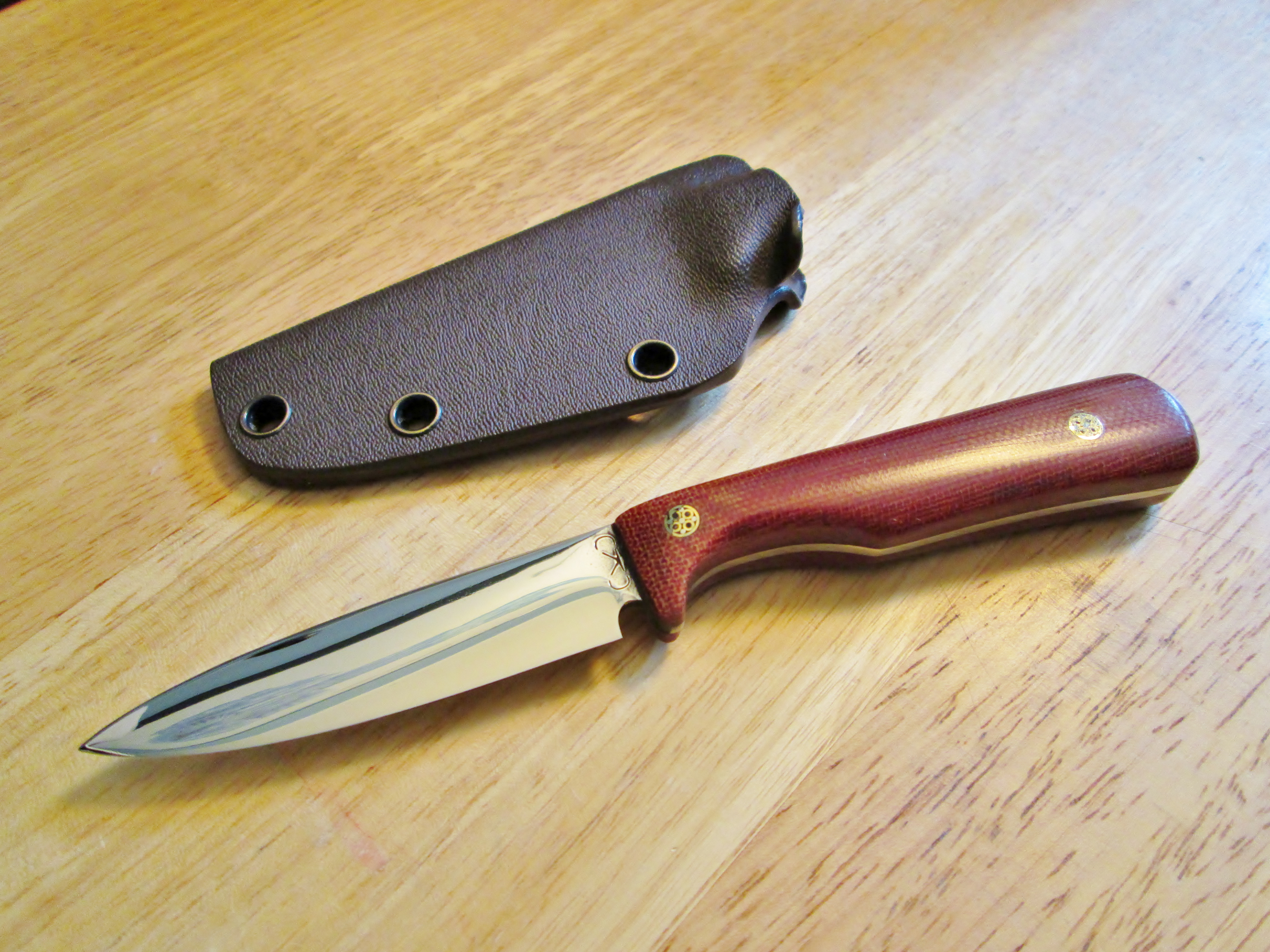
A smaller knife that may be worn on a neck-lanyard

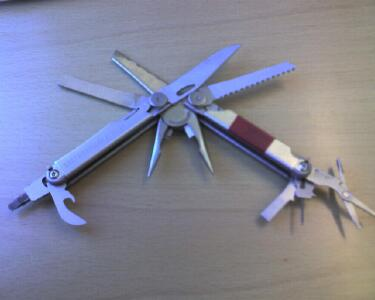
A heavier multi-tool may be belt-carried.

A pack's capacity to carry items is determined by:

- Carrying methods on the body
- Bag volume
- Construction strength, design, materials, and construction quality

Commonly used carrying means include:

- A wristband, belt loop, a thin neck lanyard, or clothing pockets for carrying lighter contents
- A body pack or tactical vest
- A single-shoulder pack
- A waist pack
- Day packs: small to mid-sized backpacks that have two shoulder straps
- A harness system
- Larger cargo backpacks

== Apparel ==
Apparel provides insulation from heat, cold, water, and fire. It shades the body and protects it from injury from thorns, insect bites, blisters, and UV rays.

Basic outdoor clothing materials are goose down, wool, polyester, and polyolefin, which provide similar degrees of insulation when dry. Wool and polyesters perform reasonably well for most weather conditions and provide some insulation while wet. Cotton and linen wicks moisture, which is good for hot or humid weather.

Natural fabrics, such as cotton, linen, and wool have high burn temperatures, and they char instead of melting when exposed to flame. When a fabric melts onto skin it is difficult to remove, unlike a material that chars. Nomex is used for fire-resistant clothing.

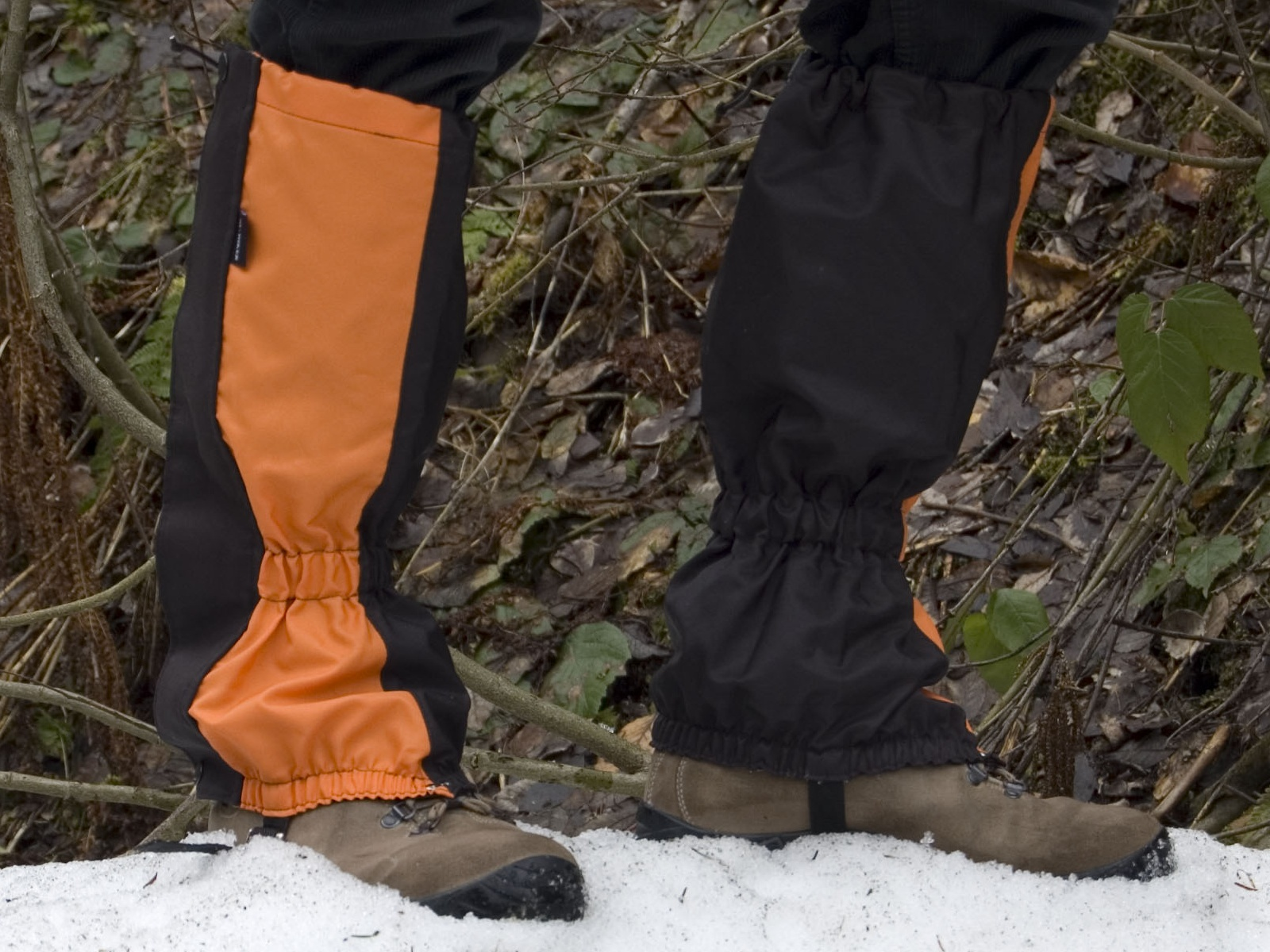
Hiking gaiters

Shoes with traction reduce the chance of slipping. Shoes that support the ankle may also prevent injury. Breathable and waterproof hiking boots are general-purpose hiking shoes. Mountaineering boots provide more specialized protection. Waterproof gaiters are used in cold or wet conditions to protect the lower pants and upper part of the shoes and reduces the amount of water, snow, and debris that gets into boots.

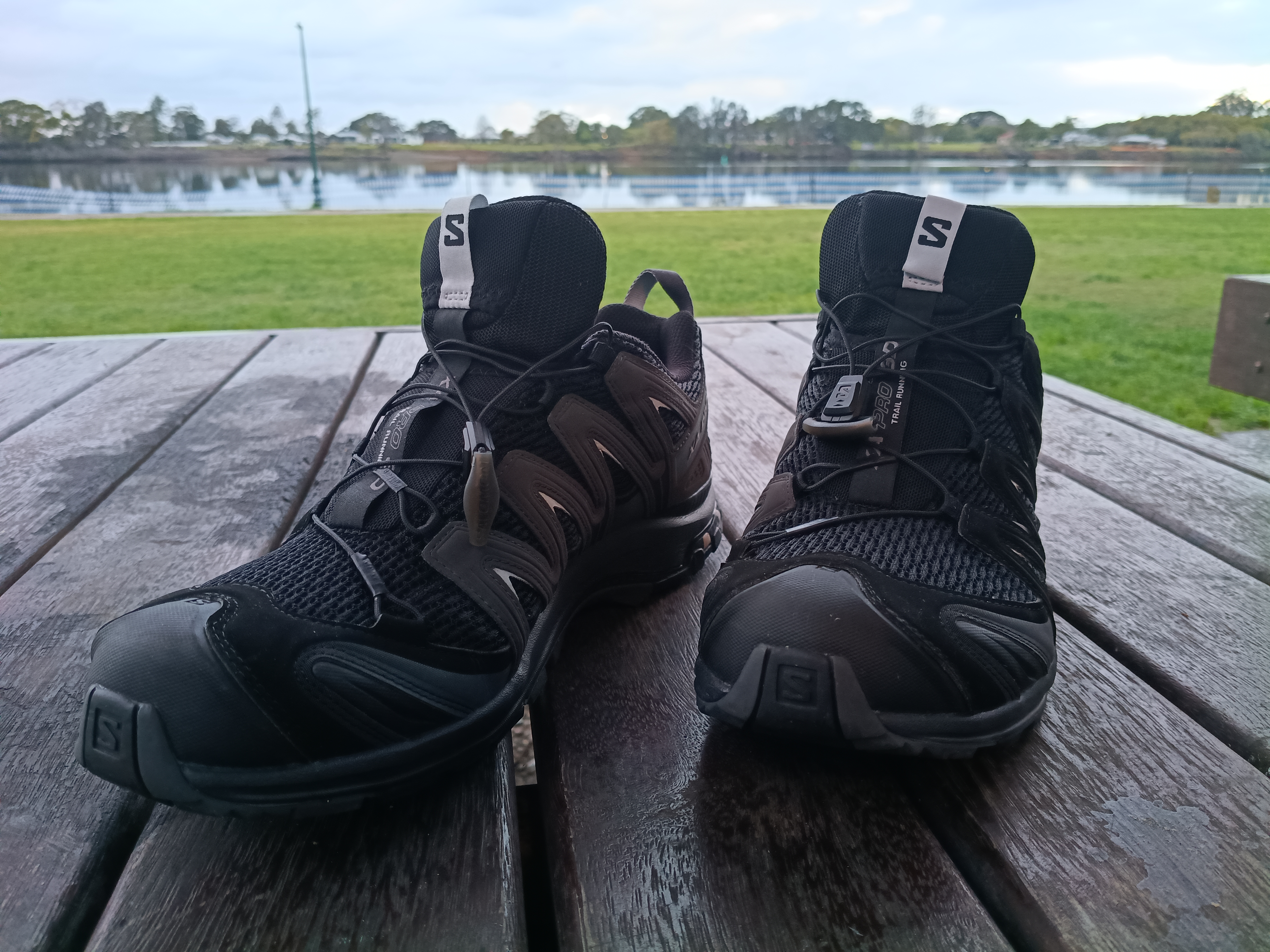
A pair of Salomon XA PRO 3D trail running and hiking shoes.

Although not traditionally used for hiking, trail runners are also used by hikers, particularly fastpackers and ultralight backpackers.

== Overnight shelter ==
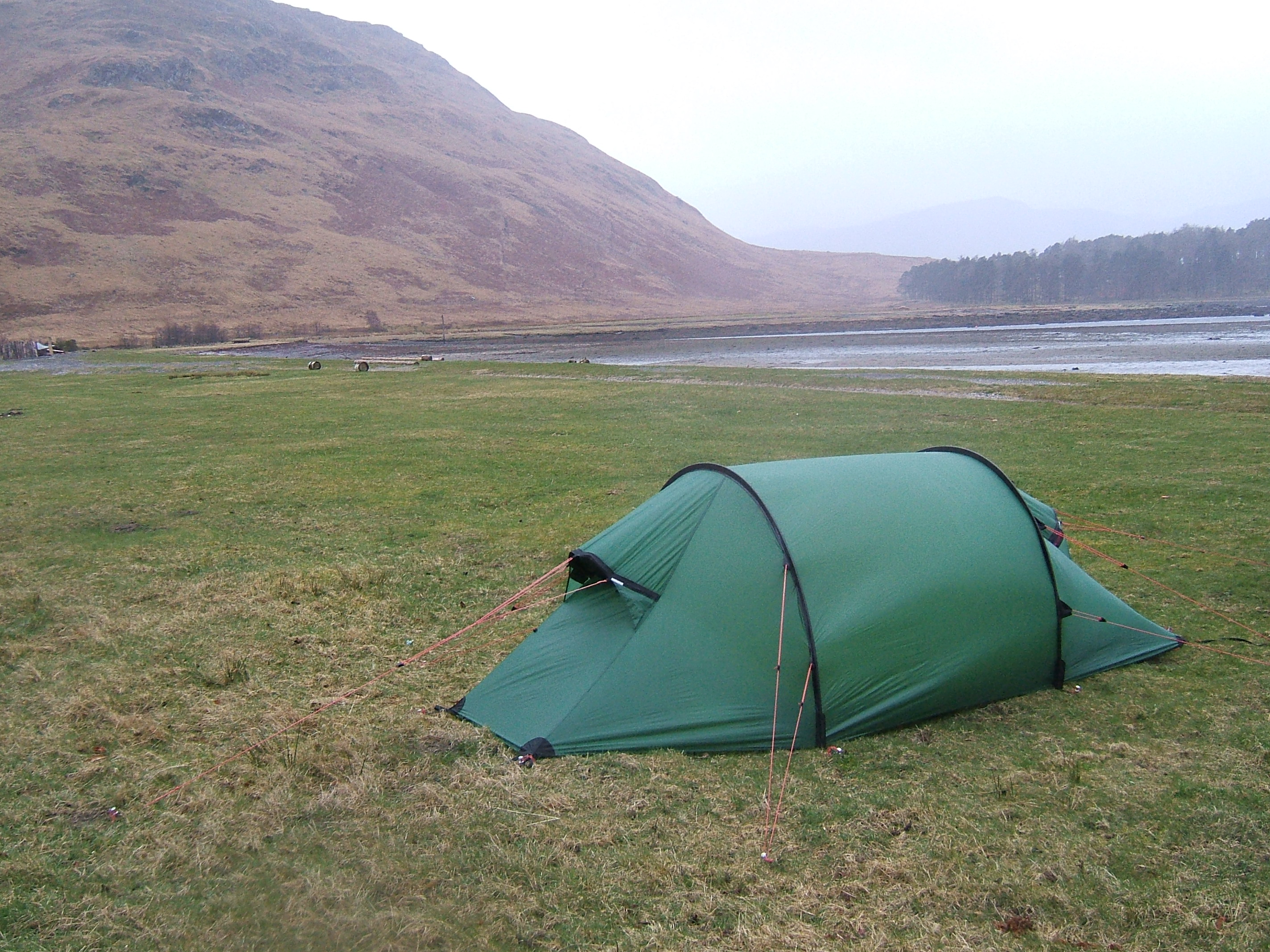
Tunnel tent

An overnight shelter may include a wool blanket and tarp or a complete sleep-system inside a double-walled, four-season tent. Bedding options range from a pillow made from clothes to a sleep system consisting of a sleeping pad, sleeping bag, bivouac shelter, bag liner, and compression sack. Shelter structures can be constructed from a tarpaulin, ground sheet, rope, poles, or trees (with a mosquito net).

== Other hiking equipment ==
- Food
- Electronics
- Sleeping bag, sleeping pad
- Bandana for a hat, dust mask, face scarf, water filter, first-aid, or signal
- Knife, multi-tool, tomahawk, hatchet, axe, bucksaw, snow knife or snow saw for cutting, chopping, and sawing:
- Sharp stick, stout knife, trowel, ice axe, entrenching tool (folding shovel), compact shovel, snow shovel for digging
- Flashlight
- Medical supplies
- Sunglasses, sunscreen, and lip balm for protection from the sun
- Trekking poles or hiking pole for stability and balance
- Containers for carrying water
- Cordage
- GPS navigation device

== Possible hazards ==
Possible hazards of hiking that may affect equipment choices include:

- Alligators
- Altitude sickness
- Avalanche
- Bears
- Cattle
- Cliffs
- Dehydration
- Drowning
- Exsanguination
- Exposure (heights)
- Flash floods
- Hyperthermia
- Hypothermia
- Lightning
- Malaria
- Moose
- Poisonous animals
- Poisonous plants
- Starvation
- Swamps
- Ticks
- Weather
- Whitewater
- Wilderness diarrhea
- Wildfires

== See also ==
- Camping equipment
- Outdoor education
- Rock-climbing equipment
- Scout Outdoor Essentials
- Search and rescue
- Survival kit
  - Mini survival kits
- Survival skills
- Ten Essentials

=== Related activities ===
- Adventure travel
- Camping
- Canoeing
- Cross-country skiing
- Dog hiking
- Fishing
- Hammock camping
- Hillwalking
- Hunting
- Jungle tourism
- Llama hiking
- Mountain biking
- Mountaineering
- Nordic Walking
- Orienteering
- Rafting
- Rock climbing
- Scrambling
- Snowshoeing
- Swimhiking
- Thru-hiking
- Travel backpacking
- Travel writing
- Walking tour
- Wilderness backpacking or trekking

== Bibliography ==
- Brown, Tom (April 15, 1987). Tom Brown's Field Guide to Wilderness Survival. Berkley Trade. ISBN 978-0425105726.
- Canterbury, Dave. Survivability for the Common Man, The Pathfinder System. Amazon Digital Services, Inc. ASIN B007JY1Q6M
- Cole, George; Jordan, Ryan; Dixon, Alan (2006). Lightweight Backpacking and Camping. Bozeman, MT: Beartooth Mountain Press. ISBN 0-9748188-2-8.
- Gonzales, Laurence (2004). Deep Survival: Who Lives, Who Dies, and Why. W. W. Norton & Company. ISBN 978-0393326154.
- Hatt, John. (1983) The Tropical Traveller, The Essential Guide to Travel in Hot Countries ISBN 978-0330265775
- Jardine, Ray (1999). Beyond Backpacking: Ray Jardines Guide to Lightweight Hiking. LaPine, OR: AventureLore Press. ISBN 0-9632359-3-1.
- Jasper, George W.. Six Ways In And Twelve Ways Out, a SERE manual, US Rescue and Special Operations Group, Manual.
- Lundin, Cody (June 23, 2003). 98.6 Degrees: The Art of Keeping Your Ass Alive. Gibbs Smith. ISBN 978-1586852344.
- Manning, Harvey. Backpacking – One step at a time ISBN 978-0394729398
