= Backpacking (hiking) =

Recreation of carrying gear while hiking

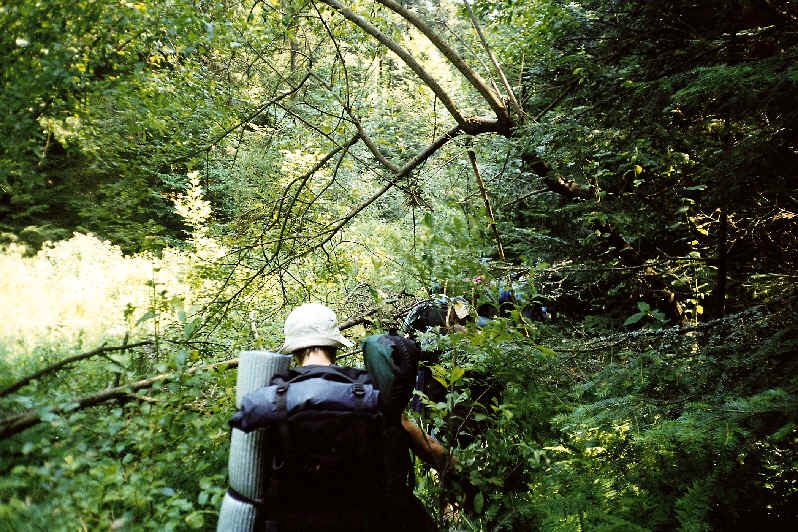
Backpacking in the Beskid Niski Mountains, in the Polish part of the Carpathian Mountains

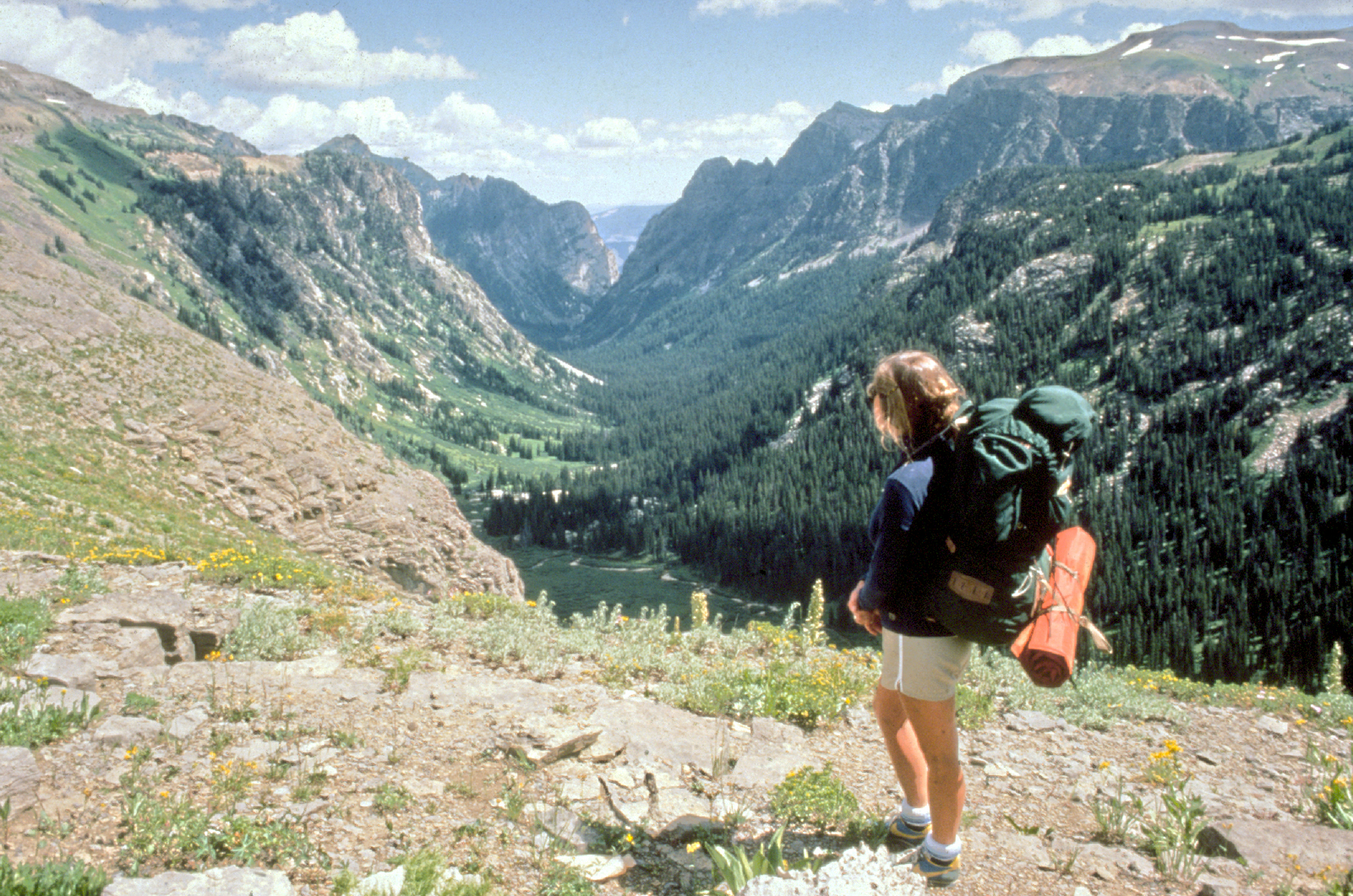
Backpacking in the Grand Teton National Park, Wyoming

Backpacking is the outdoor recreation practice of carrying gear on one's back while hiking for more than a day. It is often an extended journey and may involve camping outdoors. In North America, tenting is common, whereas simple shelters and mountain huts, widely found in Europe, are rare. In New Zealand, hiking is called tramping, and tents are used alongside a nationwide network of huts. Hill walking is equivalent in Britain (but this can also refer to a day walk), though backpackers make use of a variety of accommodation, in addition to camping. Backpackers use simple huts in South Africa. "Trekking" and "bushwalking" are other terms used to describe multi-day backpacking trips, with the term "trekking" emphasizing a more self-reliant approach to backpacking in more remote areas. The terms "walking tour" or "long-distance hike" are also used.

Backpacking as a method of travel is a different activity, which mainly uses public transport during a journey that can last months. It is, however, similar to bikepacking, bicycle touring, canoe and kayak camping, and trail riding, with saddlebags.

== Definition ==
Backpacking is an outdoor recreation where gear is carried in a backpack. This can include food, water, bedding, shelter, clothing, stove, and cooking kit. Given that backpackers must carry their gear, the total weight of their bag and its contents is a primary concern of backpackers. Backpacking trips range from one night to weeks or months, sometimes aided by planned resupply points, drops, or caches.

== Research ==
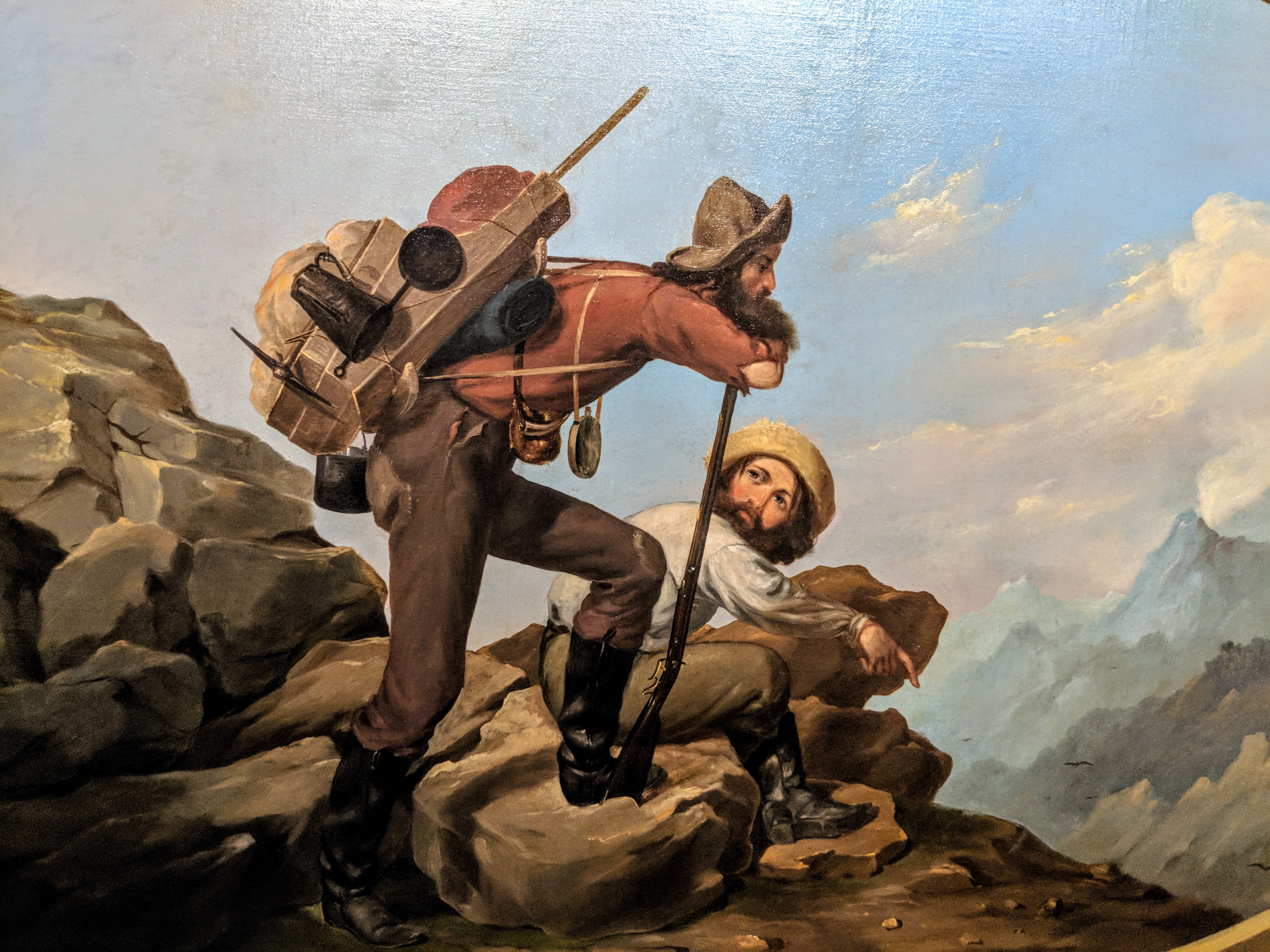
A miner carrying a backpack during the California Gold Rush

Carrying loads appears to have differentiated humans from other animals.

=== Fitness benefits ===
A weighted carry from backpacking taxes muscles. A weighted load stresses the shoulders, deltoids, back, abdominals, obliques, hips, quadriceps, hamstrings and the knees. Humans can carry weight under 50 pounds (23 kg) in a safe manner, and a weighted carry is as beneficial for the cardiovascular system as a light run, and for exercise, a weighted carry helps avoid injuries.

A differential exists between a man running in comparison to a man walking while carrying a backpack. A 175-pound (79 kg) man running, without a backpack, loads his knees with 1,400 pounds (640 kg) of stress per stride. The same person, carrying a 30-pound (14 kg) pack, loads his knees with 555 pounds (252 kg) of stress per step.

== Accommodations ==
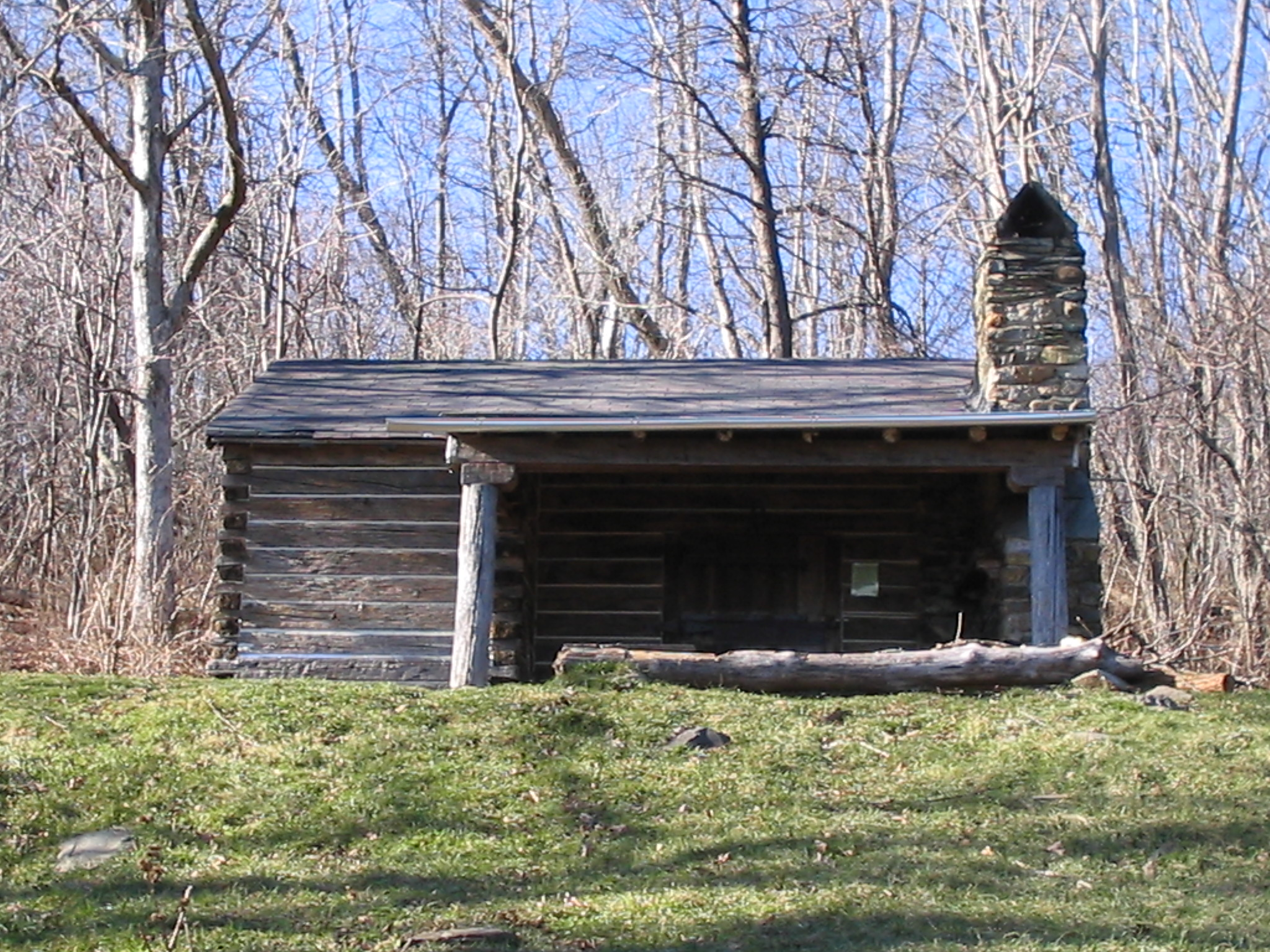
The Pocosin cabin along the Appalachian Trail in Shenandoah National Park

Backpacking camps are usually more spartan than campsites where gear is transported by car or boat. In areas with heavy backpacker traffic, a hike-in campsite might have a fire ring (where permissible), an outhouse, a wooden bulletin board with a map and information about the trail and area. Many hike-in camps are no more than level patches of ground free of underbrush. In remote wilderness areas hikers must choose their own site. Established camps are rare and the ethos is to "leave no trace" when gone.

In some regions, varying forms of accommodation exist, from simple log lean-to's to staffed facilities offering escalating degrees of service. Beds, meals, and even drinks may be had at Alpine huts scattered among well-traveled European mountains. Backpackers there can walk from hut-to-hut without leaving the mountains, while in places like the Lake District or Yorkshire Dales in England hill-walkers descend to stay in youth hostels, farmhouses or guest houses. Reservations can usually be made in advance and are recommended in the high season.

In the more remote parts of Great Britain, especially Scotland, bothies exist to provide simple (free) accommodation for backpackers. On the French system of long distance trails, Grande Randonnées, backpackers can stay in gîtes d'étapes, which are simple hostels provided for walkers and cyclists. There are some simple shelters and occasional mountain hut also provided in North America, including on the Appalachian Trail. Another example is the High Sierra Camps in the Yosemite National Park. Long-distance backpacking trails with huts also exist in South Africa, including the 100 km plus Amatola Trail, in the Eastern Cape Province. Backpacking is also popular in the Himalayas (often called trekking there), where porters and pack animals are often used.

== Equipment ==
Backpacking gear depends on the terrain and climate, and on a hiker's plans for shelter (refuges, huts, gites, camping, etc.). It may include:

1. A backpack of appropriate size. Backpacks can include frameless, external frame, internal frame, and bodypack styles.
2. Clothing and footwear appropriate for the conditions.
3. Food and a means to prepare it (stove, utensils, pot, etc.).
4. Sleep system such as a sleeping bag and a pad.
5. Survival gear.
6. A shelter such as a tent, tarp or bivouac sack.
7. Water containers and purifiers.

=== Water ===
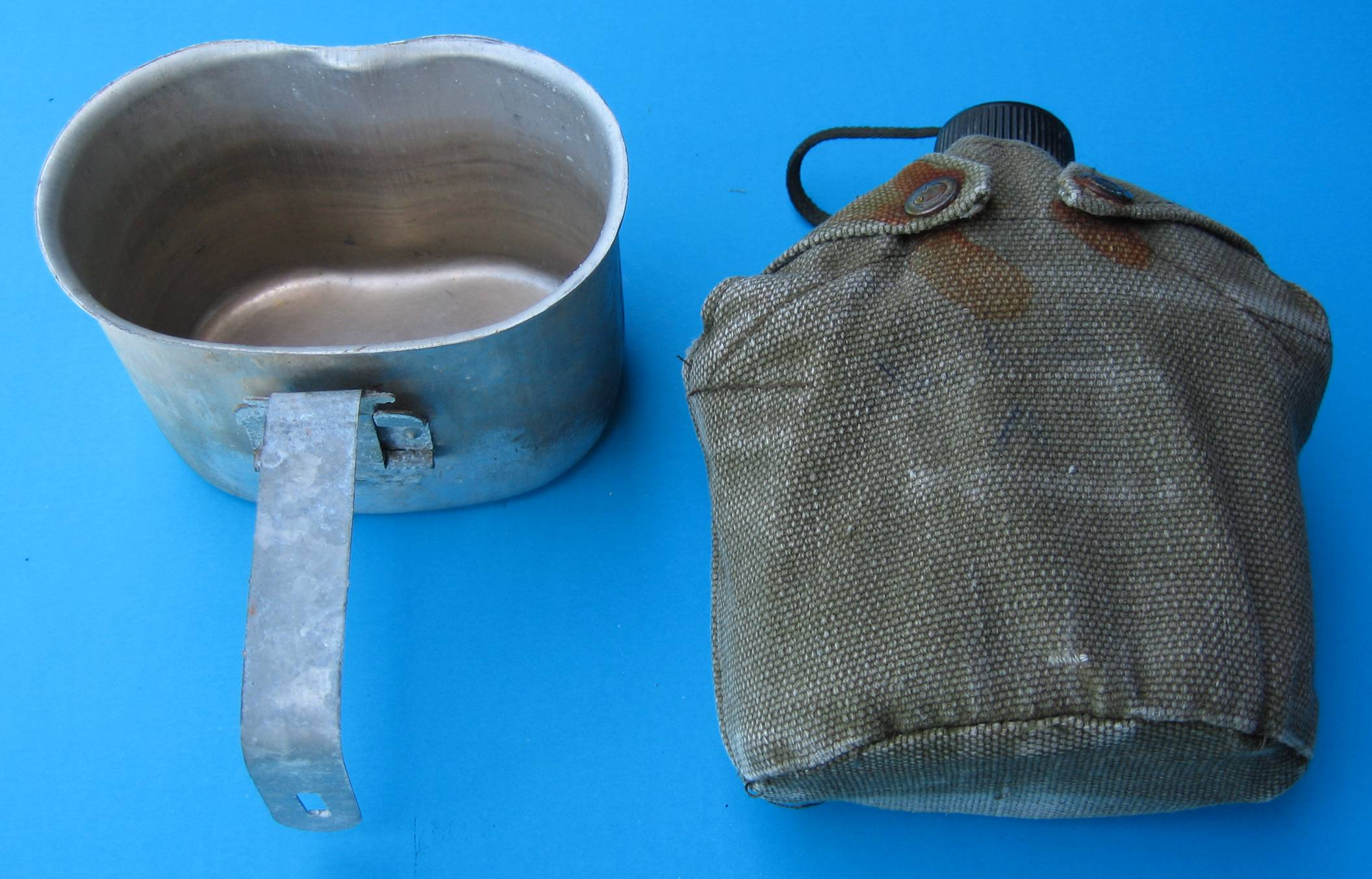
Military canteen with nested canteen cup and cover

Proper hydration is critical to successful backpacking. Depending on conditions - which include weather, terrain, load, and the hiker's age and fitness - a backpacker may drink 2 to 8 litres (1/2 to 2 gallons), or more, per day. At 1 kilogram (2.2 lb) per 1 litre (1.1 US qt) water is exceptionally heavy. It is impossible to carry more than a few days' supply. Therefore, hikers often drink natural water supplies, sometimes after filtering or purifying.

Some hikers will treat water before drinking to protect against waterborne diseases carried by bacteria and protozoa. The chief treatment methods include:

- Boiling
- Treatment with chemicals such as chlorine or iodine
- Filtering (often used with chemical treatments)
- Treatment with ultraviolet light

Water may be stored in bottles or collapsible plastic bladders. Hydration bladders are increasingly popular.

=== Food ===
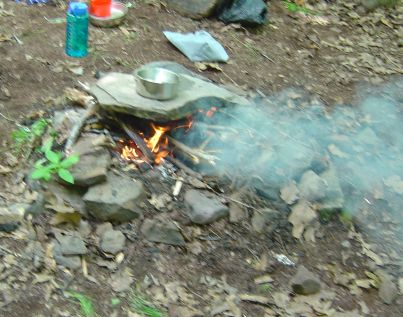
Cooking in the outdoors using a heated stone

Backpacking is energy-intensive: long-distance hikers require up to 4,500 calories of food energy per day. This is the equivalent of 0.68 to 1.13 kilograms (1.5 to 2.5 lb) of food.

There are several choices for backpacking food. Many hikers use freeze-dried precooked entrees for hot meals, quickly reconstituted by adding boiling water. Popular snacks include trail mix, nuts, energy bars, and chocolate. Some backpackers consume dried foods, including beef jerky, dried fruit, instant oatmeal, and powdered hummus.

There are three common ways to prepare food while backpacking: cold soaking, cooking on a camp stove, and cooking over a campfire. Cold soaking consists of rehydrating dried food with cold water, generally used to avoid carrying the weight of a stove. For stove cooking, small liquid or gas-fueled stoves and lightweight cooking pots are common.

When campfires are not prohibited, it is possible to cook food directly over a campfire. Campfires can be used to boil, bake, roast, or fry food.

For long-distance backpacking trips, it is sometimes not possible to carry all of the food required from the beginning. In this situation, backpackers need to resupply with food. This resupply can be done by either buying new food in towns along the route, or mailing themselves boxes of food.

=== Ultralight-hiking ===
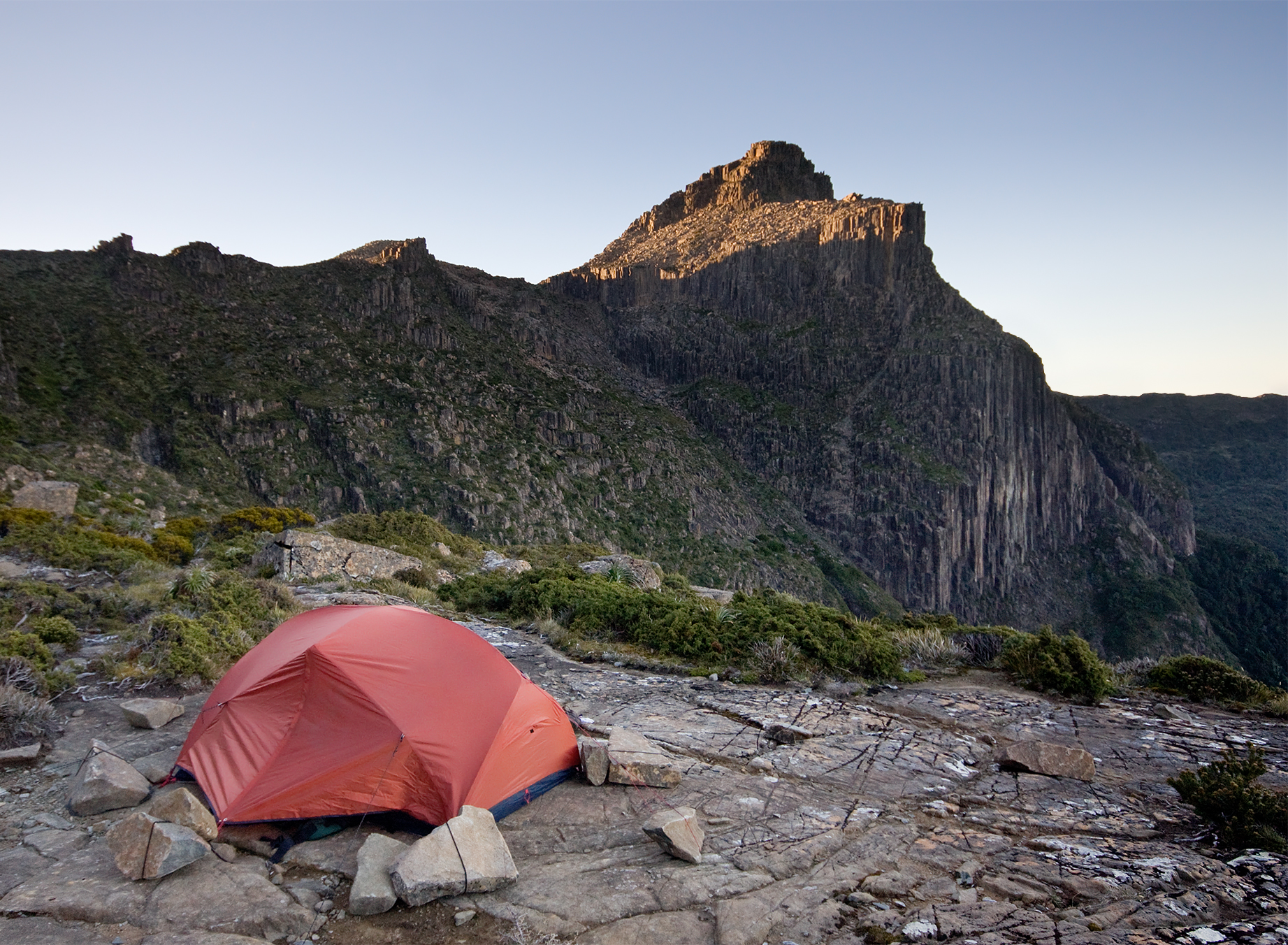
A backpacker's modern lightweight dome tent near Mount Anne in a Tasmanian Wilderness area

Ultralight backpacking is a style of lightweight backpacking that emphasizes carrying the lightest and least amount of gear. While no technical standards exist, some hikers consider "ultralight" to mean an initial base weight of less than 4.5 kg (10 lb). Base weight is the weight of a fully loaded backpack at the start of a trip, excluding worn weight and consumables such as food, water, and fuel (which vary depending on the duration and style of trip). Base weight can be lowered by reducing the weight of individual items of gear, or by choosing not to carry that gear. Ultralight backpacking is popular among thru-hikers.

Ultralight backpacking was popularized by American rock climber Ray Jardine, whose 1992 book PCT Hiker's Handbook laid the foundations for many techniques that ultralight backpackers use today. Jardine claimed his first Pacific Crest Trail thru-hike was with a base weight of 5.7 kg (13 lb), and by his third PCT thru-hike it was below 4.5 kg (10 lb)

== Skills and safety ==
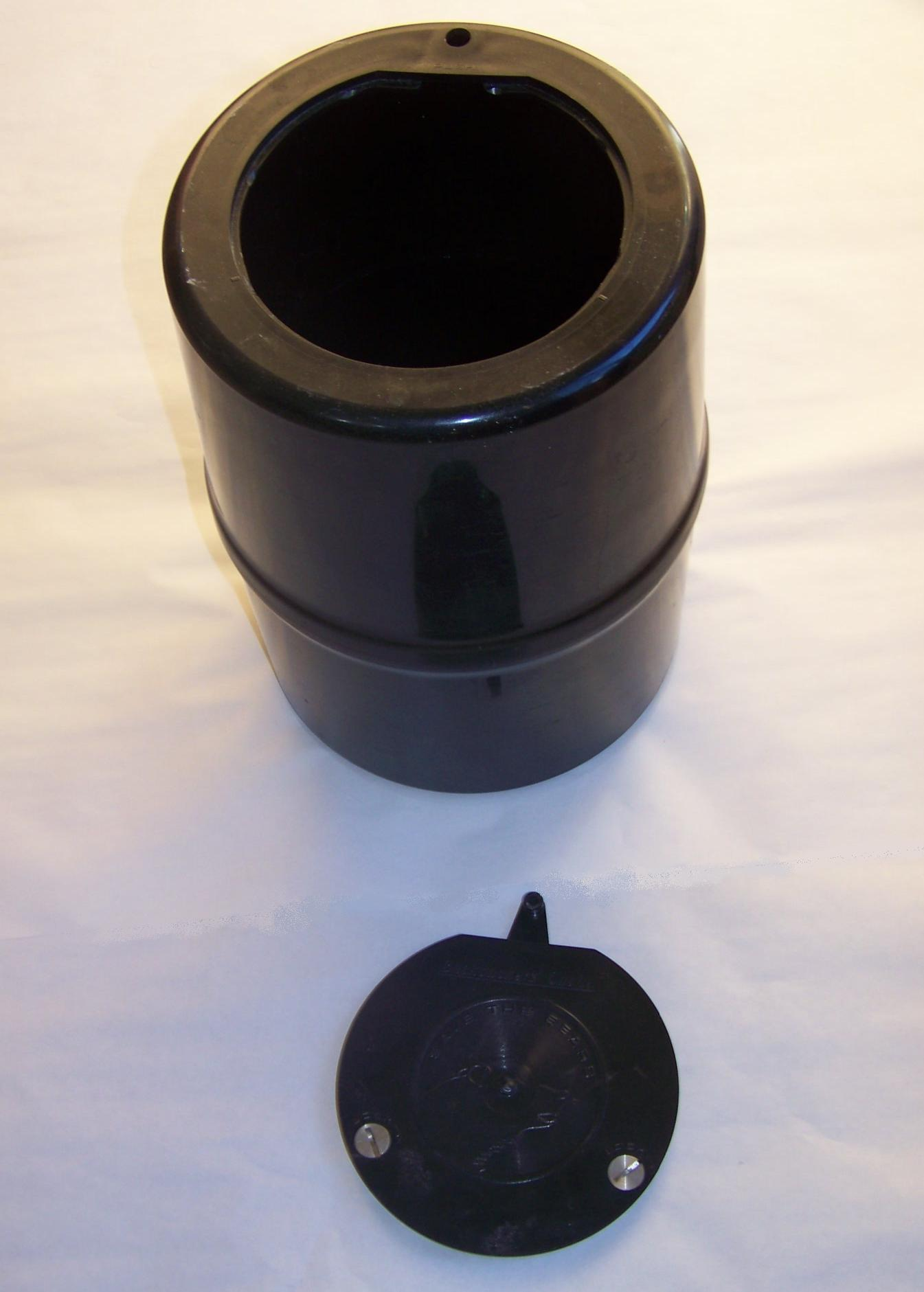
A bear-resistant food storage canister

- Survival skills can provide peace of mind and may make the difference between life and death when the weather, terrain, or environment turns unexpectedly for the worse.
- Navigation and orienteering are useful to find the trailhead, then find and follow a route to a desired sequence of destinations, and then an exit. In case of disorientation, orienteering skills are important to determine the current location and formulate a route to somewhere more desirable. At their most basic, navigation skills allow one to choose the correct sequence of trails to follow. In situations where a trail or clear line-of-sight to the desired destination is not present, navigation and orienteering allow the backpacker to understand the terrain and wilderness around them and, using their tools and practices, select the appropriate direction to hike. Weather (rain, fog, snow), terrain (hilly, rock faces, dense forest), and hiker experience can all impact and increase the challenges to navigation in the wilderness.
- First aid: effectively dealing with minor injuries (splinters, punctures, sprains) is considered by many a fundamental backcountry skill. More subtle, but maybe even more important, is recognizing and promptly treating hypothermia, heat stroke, dehydration and hypoxia, as these are rarely encountered in daily life.
- Leave No Trace is the backpacker's version of the golden rule: To have beautiful and pristine places to enjoy, help make them. At a minimum, do not make them worse.
- Distress signaling is a skill of last resort.

== Discrimination ==
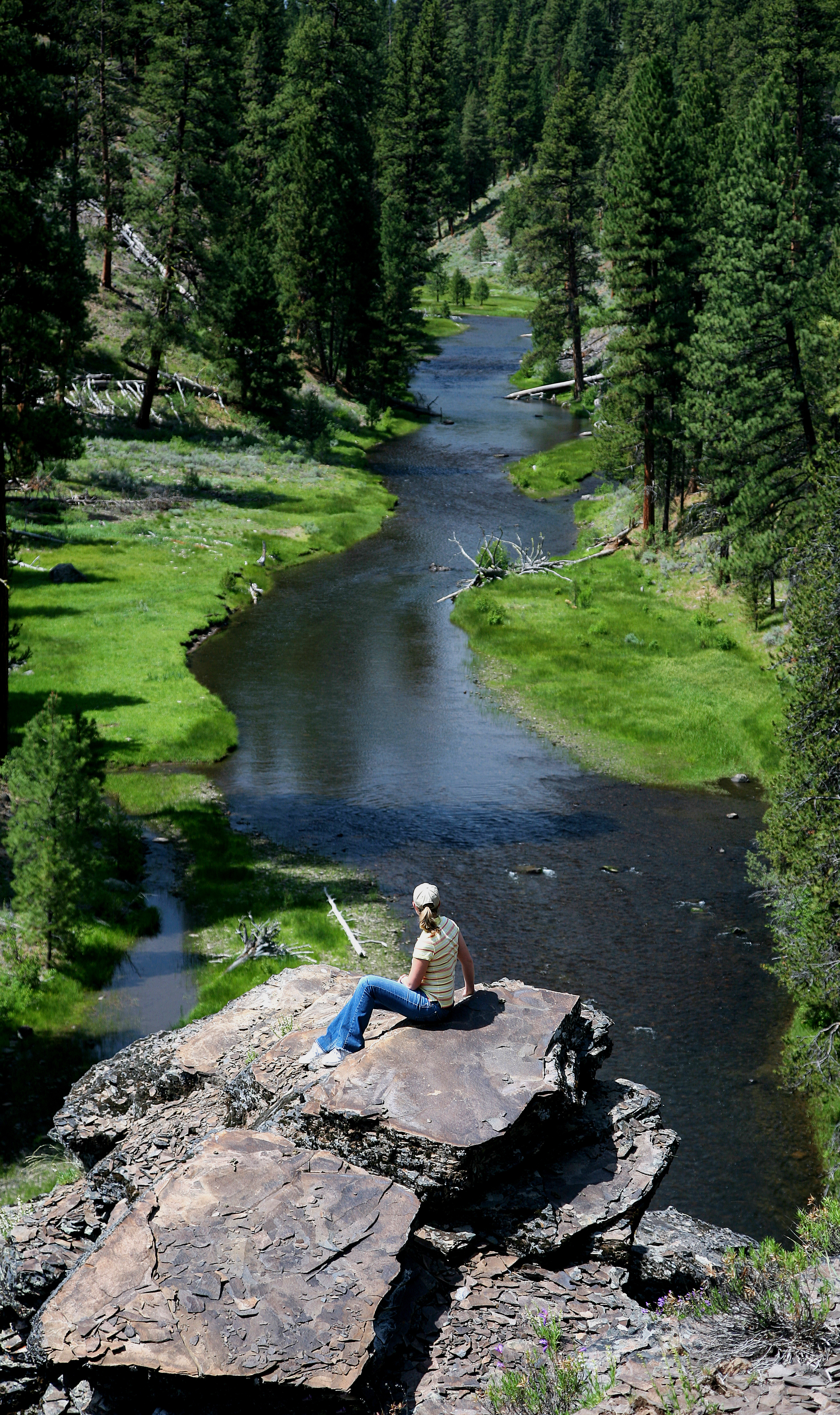
A female hiker at Malheur River in the Malheur National Forest

Backpacking has been a historically white male-dominated outdoor recreational activity. With official backpacks for the sport being patented since 1878, it is indicative of the demographics that the first backpack designed for and marketed towards women wasn't invented until 1979, over 100 years later.

Backpacking was popularized in the 1960s, in the US after the passing of The Wilderness Act. Since then, the majority of backpackers have been young, white, males. Studies surrounding the outdoor activity have reflected this. The effects on backpacking (hiking) on women wasn't studied until around 2004, and research is still lacking.

== Related activities ==
=== Winter backpacking ===
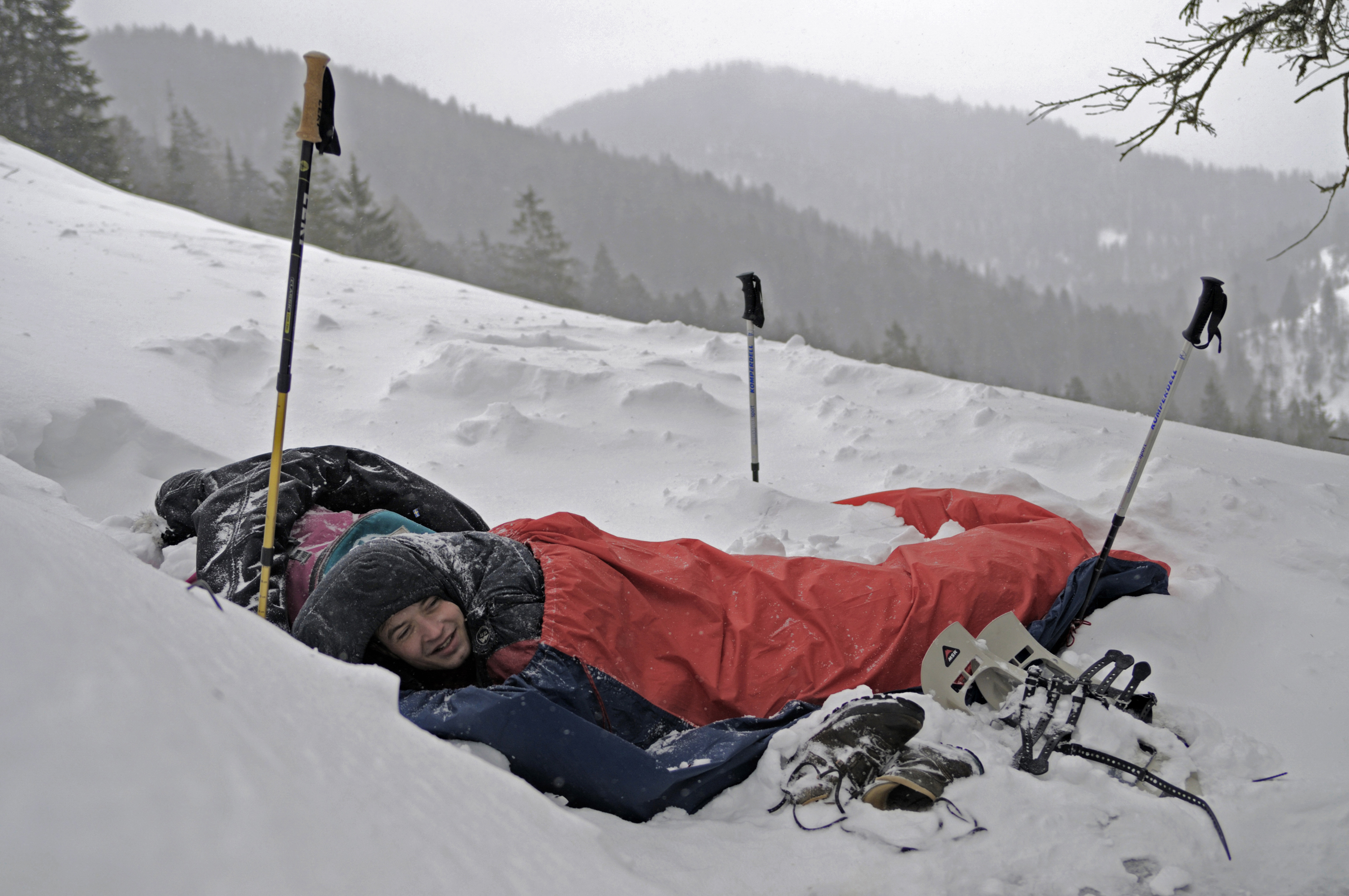
A winter bivouac in Germany.

Winter backpacking requires a higher level of skill and generally more specialized gear than in other seasons. Skis or snowshoes may be required to traverse deep snow, or crampons and an ice axe where needed. Winter sleeping bags and tents are essential, as are waterproof, water-repellent, and moisture dissipating materials. Cotton clothing retains moisture and chills the body, both particularly dangerous in cold weather. Winter backpackers stick to wool or synthetic fabric like nylon or polypropylene, which hold less moisture and often have specialized wicking properties to dissipate sweat generated during aerobic activities. Layering is essential, as wet clothes quickly sap body heat and can lead to frostbite or hypothermia.

A winter bivouac can also be made in a snow cave. It has thermal properties similar to an igloo and is effective both at providing protection from wind and low temperatures. A properly made snow cave can be 0 °C (32 °F) or warmer inside, even when outside temperatures are −40 °C (−40 °F). It is constructed by excavating snow so that its entrance tunnel is below the main space in order to retain warm air. Construction is simplified by building on a steep slope and digging slightly upwards and horizontally into the snow. The roof is domed to prevent dripping on the occupants. Adequate snow depth, free of rocks and ice, is needed — generally 4 to 5 ft (1.2 to 1.5 m) is sufficient. A quinzhee is similar, but constructed by tunneling into mounded snow rather than by digging into a natural snow formation.

=== Fastpacking ===
Fastpacking is a recreational activity that combines ultralight backpacking with running, and, on steep slopes, hiking. It is a multi-day adventure that usually takes places along long distance trails. A sleeping bag is carried and other essential backpacking items, and often a tent or similar shelter, if places to stay are not available.

=== Other ===
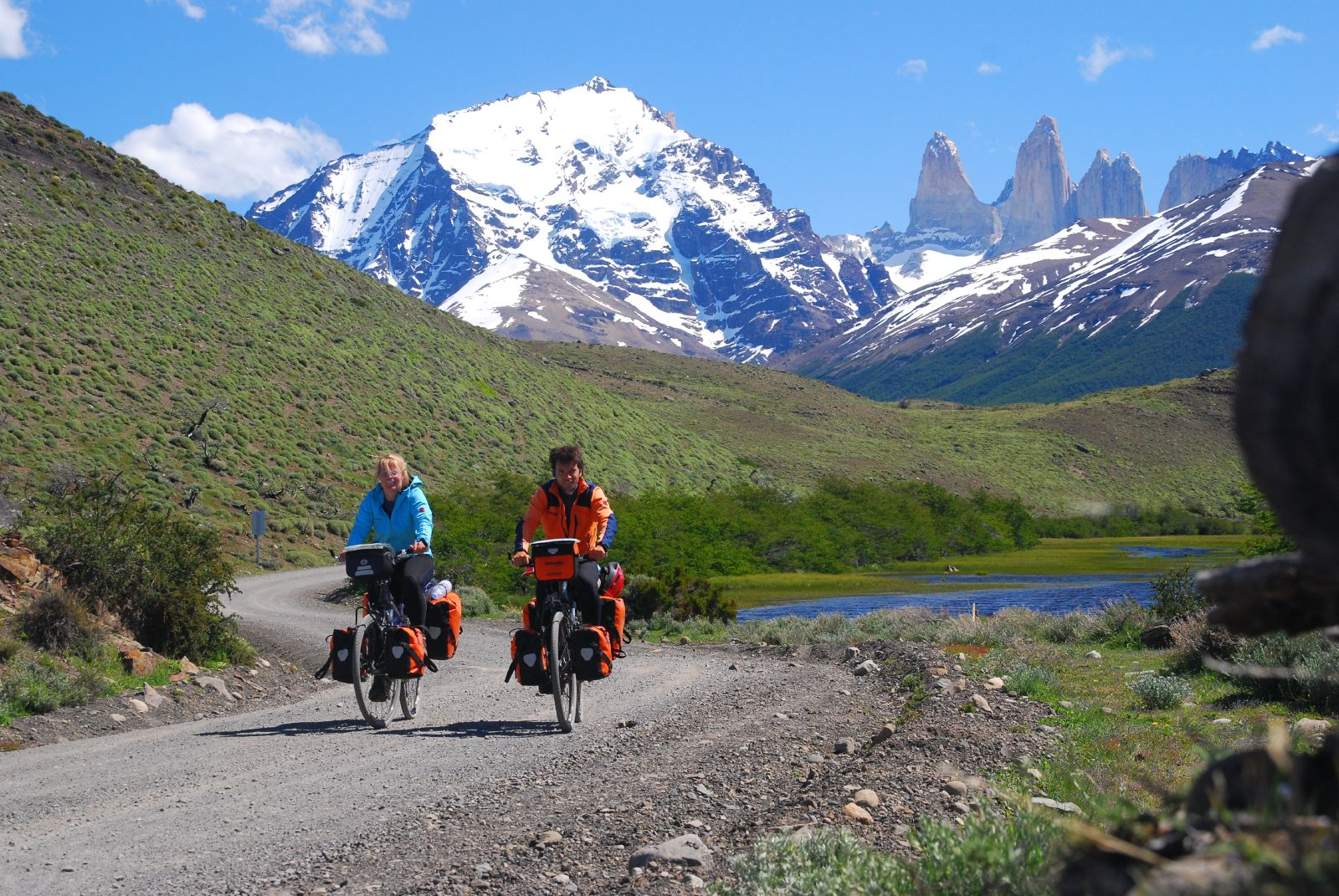
Expedition cycle touring, Torres del Paine National Park, Chile.

- Backpacking (travel), where public transport is used to visit cultural attractions, rather than natural ones, though it may also include wilderness side trips.
- Adventure travel, tourism in a highly unpredictable or hazardous region or environment.
- Thru-hiking, traversing a long-distance trail in a single, continuous journey.
- Ultralight backpacking, which minimizes both weight and amount of gear carried, typically employed in highly aerobic back-country pursuits.
- Wilderness survival

== See also ==
- Backpacking with animals
- Bivouac shelter
- Camping
- Hiking equipment
- Long distance trail
- Mountaineering
- Nordic walking
- Rambling
- Ten essentials and Survival kit
- Trekking pole
