= Fastpacking =

Combination of backpacking and trail running

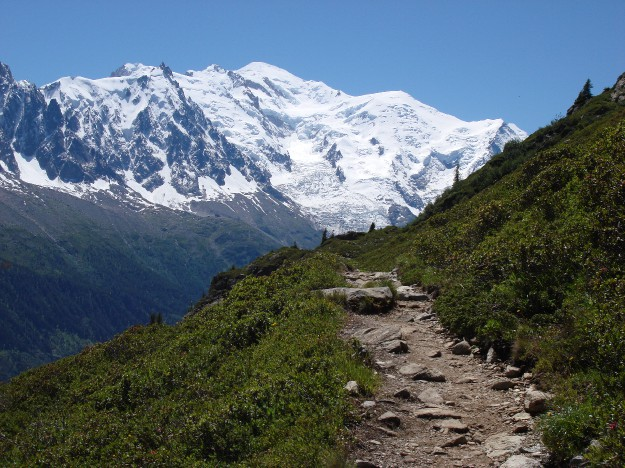
View of Mont Blanc from the Tour du Mont Blanc, seen from the Aiguilles Rouges. A typical fastpacking route.

Fastpacking is a combination of trail running and ultralight backpacking. It is described by writer Clint Cherepa as "hiking the ups, jogging the flats, and running the downs", depending on the gradient, because of the weight carried. Participants carry a light pack with essential supplies, including a sleeping bag and tent, or similar form of shelter, if mountain huts or other accommodation is not available. The weight carried will vary but fastpackers aim at no more than 15 pounds (6.8 kg) and some achieve less than 10 pounds (4.5 kg). This activity may be undertaken either unsupported, self-supported, or supported. "Unsupported fastpackers make no use of outside assistance along the route", while self-supported fastpackers will leave caches of supplies along the intended route.

Fastpacking involves covering a considerable distance over several days with a pack, which requires both mental and physical strength. Established, well-traveled long distance trails are used because "with minimal extra food and clothing, getting stuck in the backcountry for an extended period of time can quickly become a dangerous proposition".

== Routes ==
Fastpacking makes use of long distance trails including: in the United Kingdom the South Downs Way, Wainwright's Coast to Coast Walk and the West Highland Way; in Europe the Tour du Mont Blanc, the "Alta Via 1" in the Dolomites, and the Alpine Pass Route; in the US the John Muir Trail in California and the Appalachian Trail. In New Zealand world-famous routes such as the Milford, Routeburn, and Abel Tasman Tracks that take hikers several days to walk can be covered by fit fastpackers in one or two days.

== Equipment ==
On a fastpacking trip luxury items are left at home. In addition extra straps can be cut and items made to serve more than one purpose. For example, clothes worn during the day can be worn at night for extra warmth, allowing for a lighter sleeping bag to be carried.

=== Backpack ===
Ultralight frameless packs are commercially available in weights ranging from eight to fourteen ounces (200–400 g) and can consist of not much more than a sack with shoulder straps, a return to the simplicity of the rucksack. Some fastpackers make their own "ultralight pack". A good pack that is suitable for fastpacking needs to be particularly secure and comfortable when moving more quickly at a running or jogging pace. For this reason, many fastpackers choose packs that are designed for trail running or even specifically for fastpacking, so it will fit snugly and will not sway, shift around and rub when running.

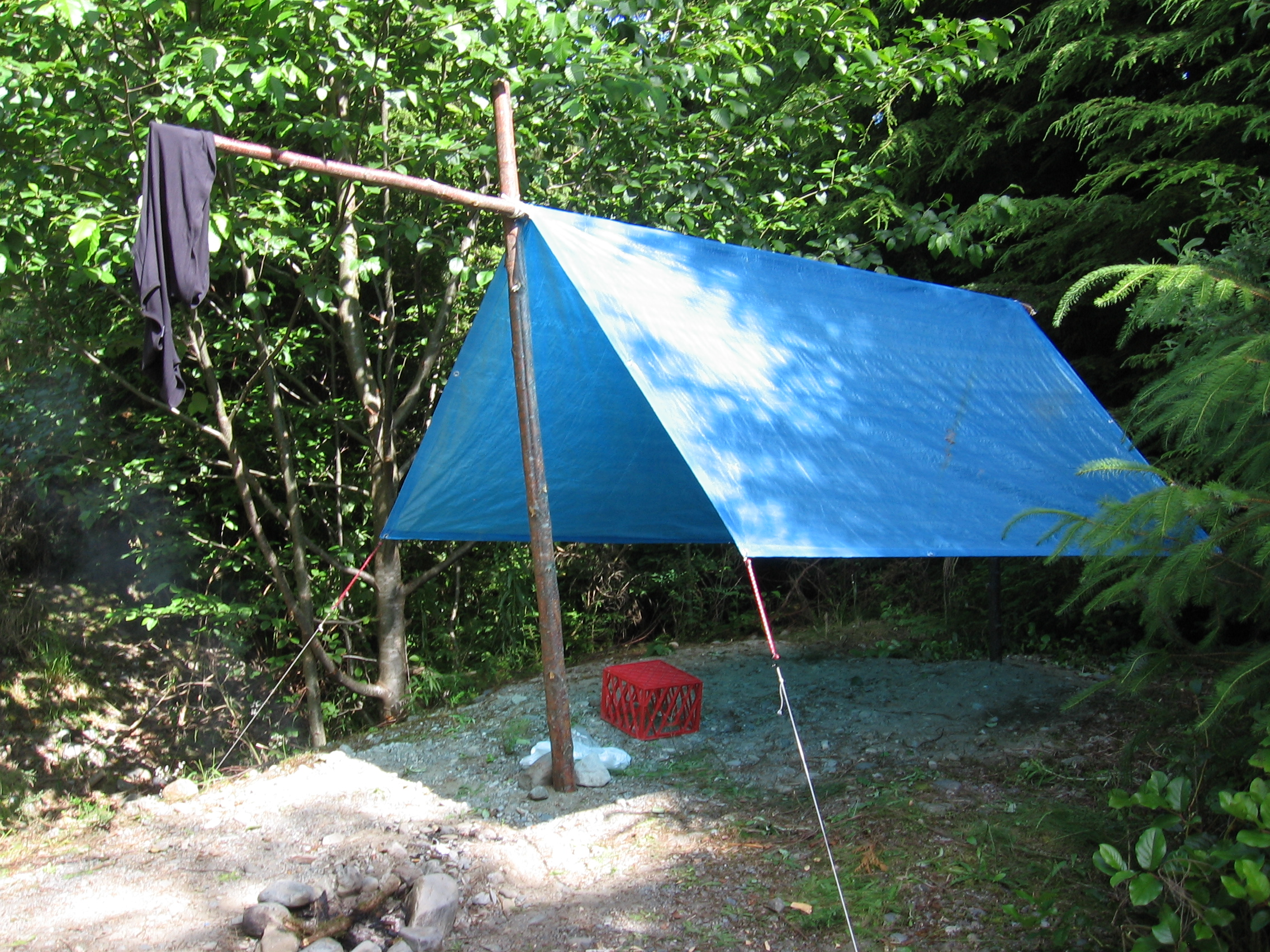
An improvised tarpaulin fly tent

=== Footwear ===
Lightweight footwear is essential because it is estimated that "every pound on your feet equals 5 pounds (2.3 kg) on your back", so that reducing the weight of boots by 2 pounds (0.91 kg) rather is equivalent to "removing 10 pounds (4.5 kg) from your pack". Most fastpackers wear running shoes or if traveling on trails and uneven terrain, will choose to wear lightweight trail running shoes which are designed to be lightweight and provide off-road grip in wet and dry conditions.

=== Shelter ===
A tarp provides the lightest type of shelter as it can weigh 1 pound (0.45 kg) or less, and can be strung from a tree, or propped with branches.

=== Ten Essentials ===
The Ten Essentials that are recommended to all hikers:

- Also recommended– whistle and cell phone.
- Basic first-aid kit.
- Fire: Matches, or fire starter in waterproof container.
- Food: Dry food is preferred to save weight.
- Headlamp, or flashlight, batteries. LED bulb is preferred to extend battery life.
- Insulation: Jacket, hat, rain shell (and when necessary gloves and thermal underwear).
- Map in waterproof container and compass
- Pocket knife and duct tape.
- Shelter: See section above.
- Sun protection: Sunglasses, sunscreen, etc.
- Water: 2 litres of water and a method of storing and purifying water.

== See also ==
- Adventure racing
- Fell running
- Mountain running
- Orienteering
- Rogaining
- Ultramarathon
