= Phoenix Pharmacy =

Building in Portland, Oregon, U.S.

- U.S. National Register of Historic Places
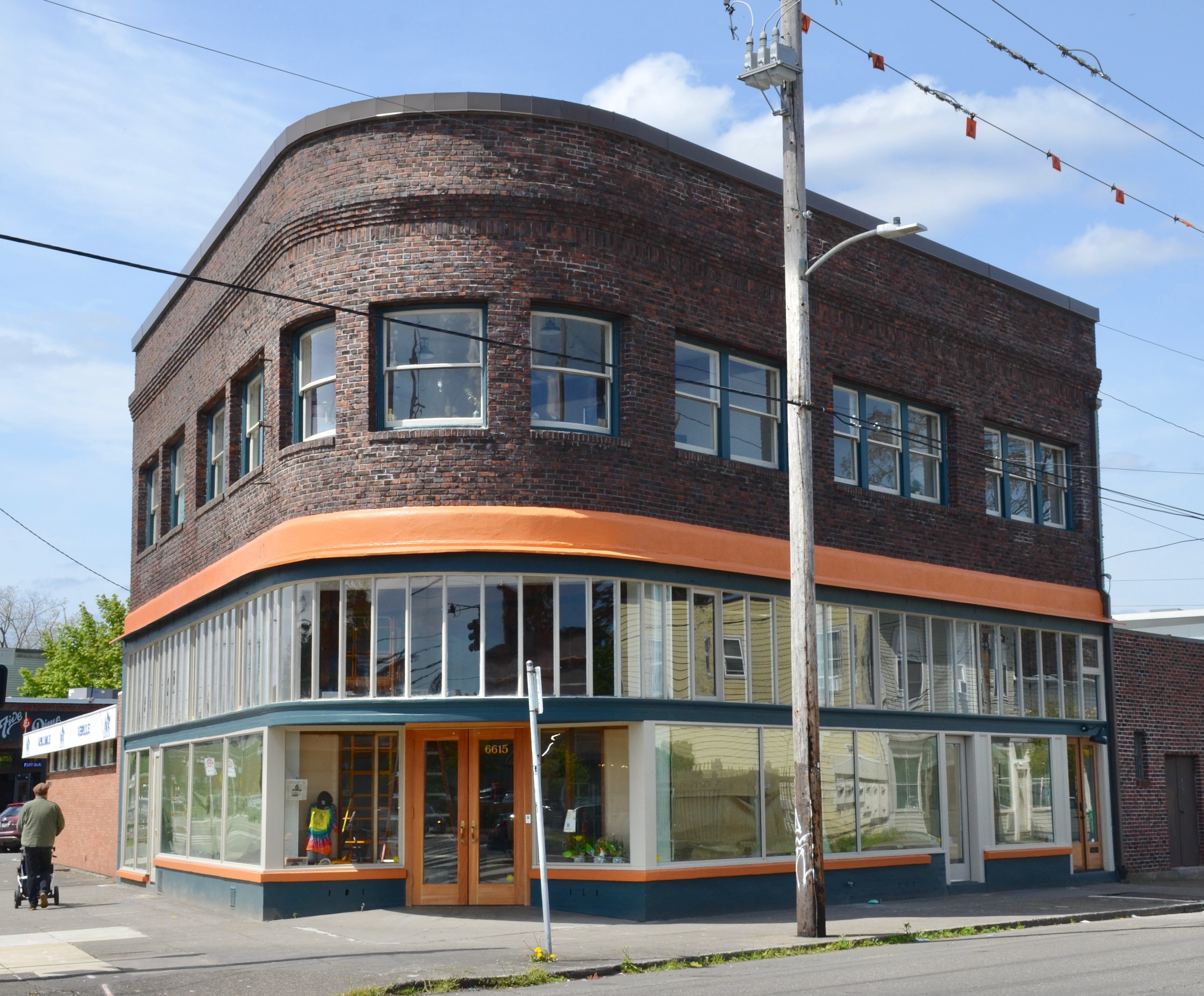
- Viewed from the southeast in May 2022

- Location within Portland, Oregon Location within Oregon Location within the United States
- Location: 6615 SE Foster Road; Portland, Oregon
- Coordinates: 45°29′20.2″N 122°35′40.2″W
- Built: 1922
- Architect: Unknown
- Architectural style: Late 19th and Early 20th Century American Movements architecture
- NRHP reference No.: 100007861
- Added to NRHP: June 21, 2022

The Phoenix Pharmacy is a historic building at the intersection of Foster Road and 67th Avenue in southeast Portland, Oregon. Built in 1922, the structure is slated for renovation, as of 2019. It was listed on the National Register of Historic Places in 2022.

The building began to reopen for occupancy in late 2021, when tenants moved into the second floor, which has five office spaces. The renovation of the building was completed around May 2022. The ground floor and mezzanine are retail space now in use by a store named Foster Outdoor, a retailer of equipment for outdoor recreation, hiking and camping, which had a soft opening in late May 2022.

== See also ==
- National Register of Historic Places listings in Southeast Portland, Oregon
