= Silnylon =

Silicone-impregnated nylon fabric

Silnylon, a portmanteau of "silicone" and "nylon", is a synthetic fabric used mainly in lightweight outdoor gear. It is made by impregnating a thin woven nylon fabric with liquid silicone from both sides. This makes it strong for its weight, as the silicone substantially improves the tear strength. It is also highly waterproof, but not breathable. Many colours are available.

It is used in the manufacture of backpacks, tarps and tarp tents, bivy bags, etc., particularly by ultralight backpackers.

Several types of silnylon are produced. The common type is a quiet, silky, very slippery fabric. The variant known as "crisp silnylon" is lighter, but brittle, noisy in movement, and easily torn. Some versions are made from the stronger nylon 66 and are used for applications like parachutes and hot air balloons. Some use a blend of silicone and polyurethane, partly to reduce the air pollution during manufacture by reducing the aromatic solvents used in the coating process.
