= Ten Essentials =

Survival items recommended by hiking and Scouting organizations

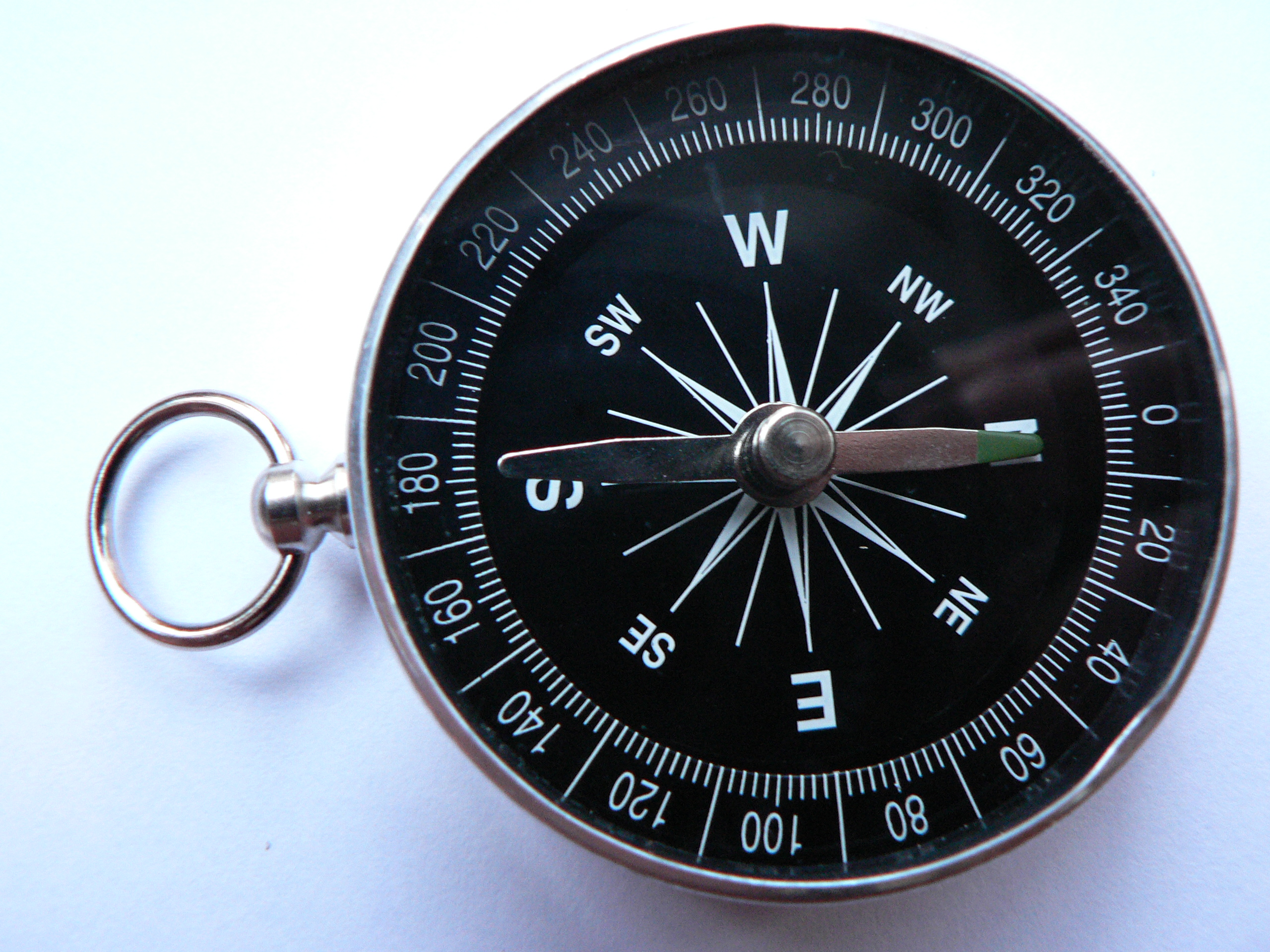
A simple dry magnetic pocket compass

The Ten Essentials are survival items that certain American hiking and scouting organizations recommend for safe travel in the North American backcountry.

The Ten Essentials first appeared in print in the third edition of Mountaineering: The Freedom of the Hills (January 1974). Many regional organizations and authors recommend that hikers, backpackers, and climbers rigorously ensure they have the ten essentials with them. However, personal preferences and differences in conditions may dictate otherwise and with experience most adventurers add and subtract from the list depending on the situation. Some ultralight backpackers do not always carry all of the items and believe it is an acceptable risk they take in order to travel light and fast.

== List ==
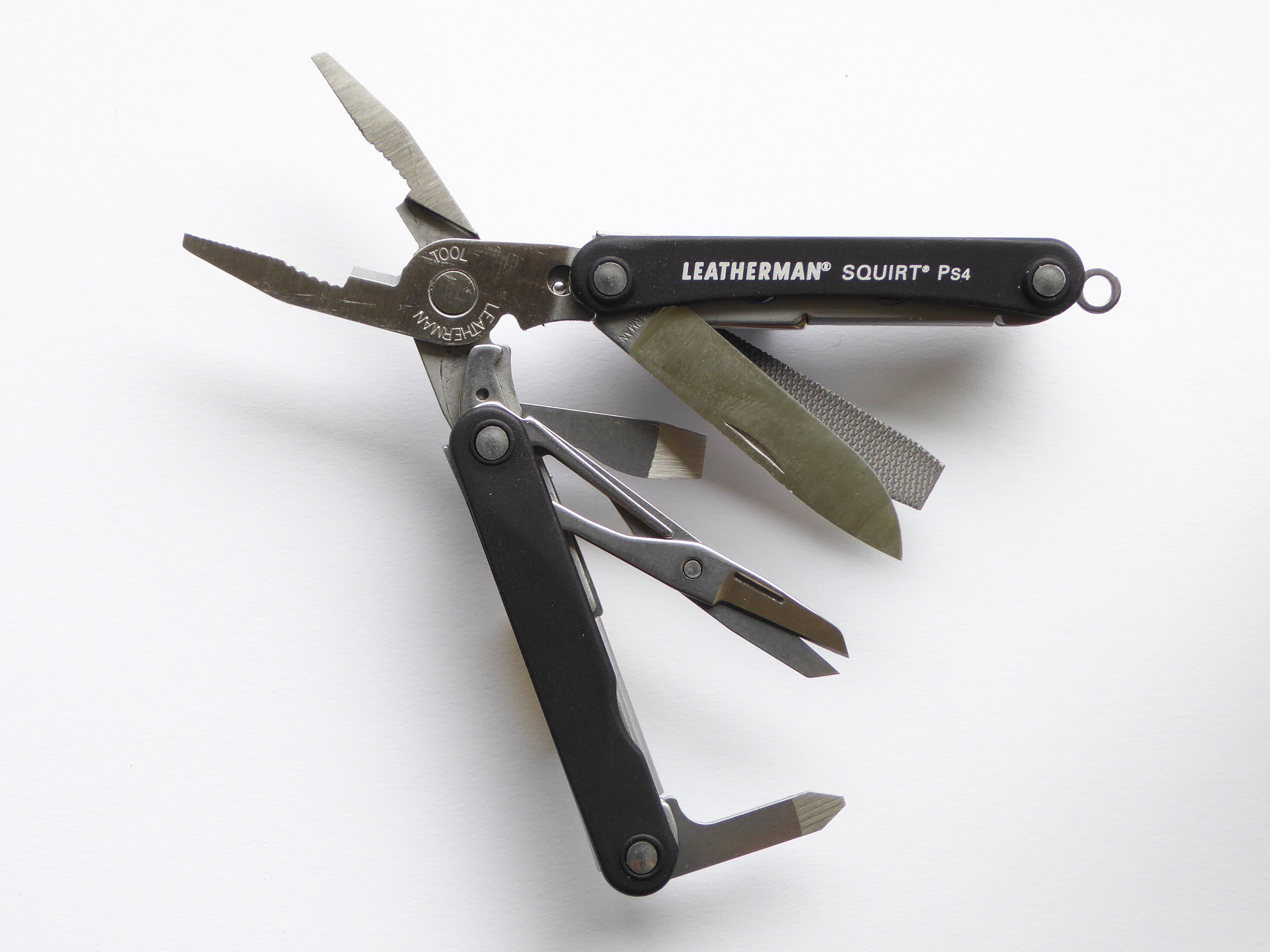
A multi-tool

The ninth edition of Mountaineering: The Freedom of the Hills, published in 2017, defines the Ten Essentials as:

1. Navigation: map, altimeter, compass, GPS device, personal locator beacon
2. Headlamp: with LED bulb and spare batteries
3. Sun protection: sunglasses, sun protective clothing, sunscreen
4. First aid: a first aid kit, wrapped in waterproof packaging
5. Knife: hikers on a short trip may also carry a multi-tool, strong adhesive tape and cordage; on a longer trip, further small tools may be useful
6. Fire: the means to both start and sustain a fire; either a butane lighter or matches, or other fire making device. Firestarters for igniting even wet wood, and in areas where no firewood will be available, a stove is highly advisable.
7. Shelter: plastic tube tent, jumbo plastic trash bag or bivy sack
8. Extra food: at least one day's food for a short hike, that should require no cooking.
9. Extra water: drinking water and the skills and tools to purify water
10. Extra clothes: additional items may be needed if spending the night in the emergency shelter

The first five items are intended to prevent and respond to emergencies, the second five to safely spend one or more nights outdoors.

== Other lists ==
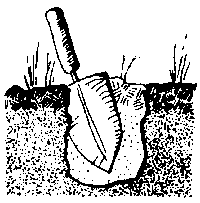
A trowel that can be used to dig a cathole

Other outdoor organizations have variations of the Ten Essentials pertinent to local conditions.

Scouting America's "Scout Basic Essentials" are quite similar (Map and Compass, Sun Protection, Extra Clothing, Flashlight, First-Aid Kit, Matches and Fire-starters, Pocketknife, Trail Food, Water Bottle, and Rain Gear.)

Utah's Wasatch Mountain Club lists extra water in place of food, as Utah is mostly desert terrain, and water is more difficult to find.

The Spokane Mountaineers list "thirteen essentials", which supplement the list with emergency shelter such as a space blanket, signaling device, and toilet paper and trowel (for sanitary disposal of human waste; the toilet paper also doubles as tinder for starting a fire).

The "Ten Essential Groups" is an alternative approach to essential gear selection. Items from each group should be chosen depending on the season, geographic location, and trip duration. In 2011, Columbia Sportswear adopted the "Ten Essential Groups" concept for their iOS app "Take Ten to the Greater Outdoors".

Central Arizona Mountain Rescue Association promotes the 12 Essentials, which includes Signaling Devices and Personal Items.

== See also ==
- Bow drill
- Camping
- Dehydration
- Emergency shelter
- Hiking equipment
- Hyperthermia
- Hypothermia
- Mini survival kit
- Navigation
- Orienteering (scouting)
- Pioneering (scouting)
- Solar still
- Survival kit
- Survival skills
- Thermal insulation
