= Ultralight backpacking =

Style of hiking

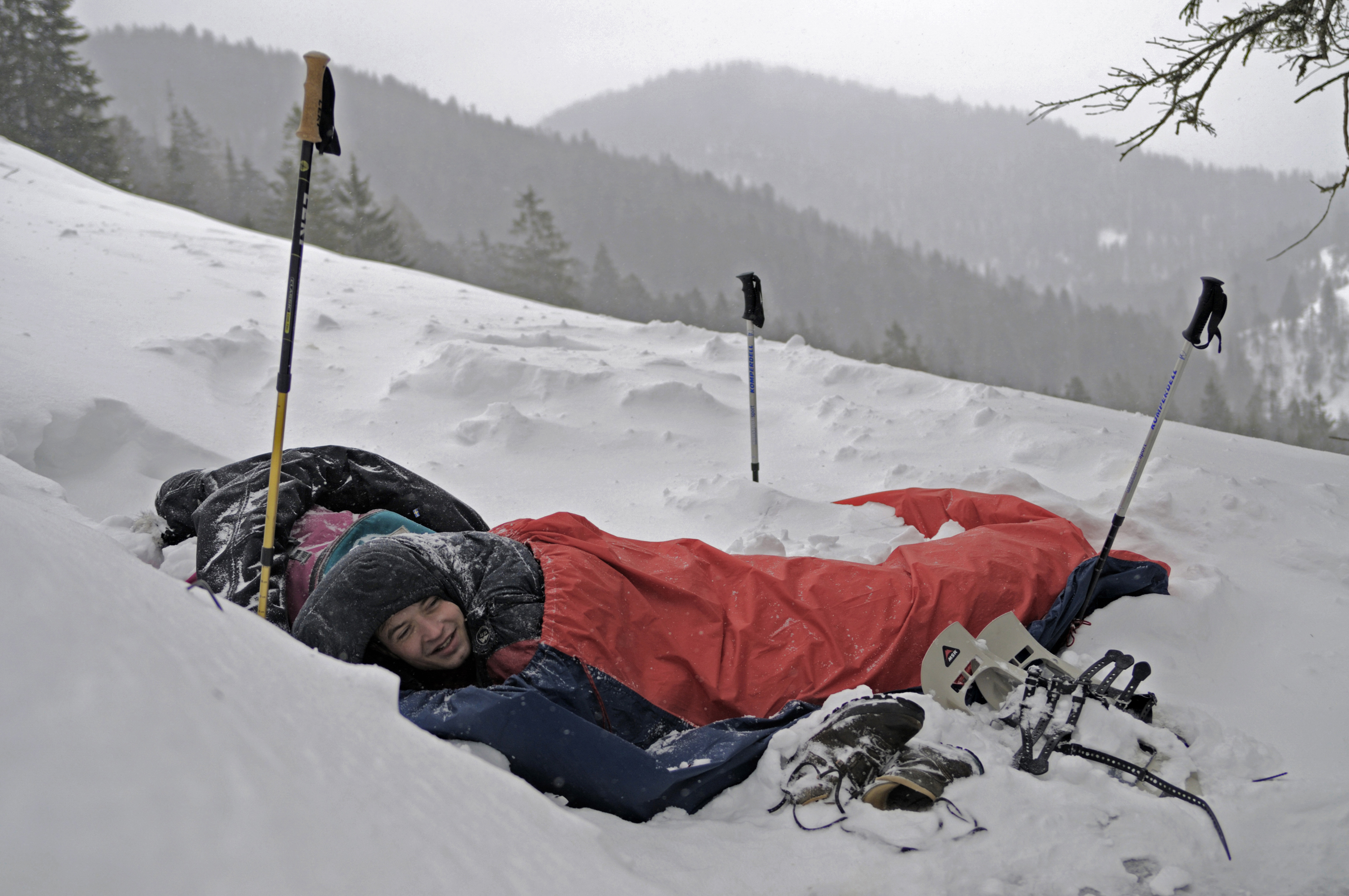
A bivouac (using a bivy sack) in winter at Benediktenwand, Germany

Ultralight backpacking (sometimes written as UL backpacking) is a style of lightweight backpacking that emphasizes carrying the lightest and least gear. While no technical standards exist, some hikers consider "ultralight" to mean an initial base weight of less than 4.5 kg (9.9 lb). Base weight is the weight of a fully loaded backpack at the start of a trip, excluding worn weight and consumables such as food, water, and fuel (which vary depending on the duration and style of trip). Base weight can be lowered by reducing the weight of individual items of gear, or by choosing not to carry that gear. Ultralight backpacking is popular among thru-hikers.

In the United States, the terms "light" and "ultralight" often refer to backpackers who carry gear with a base weight below 6.8 and 4.5 kg (15 and 10 lb) respectively. These weights are more easily achievable for smaller hikers. Larger hikers may need to carry clothes, shelters, sleep systems and backpacks that weigh up to 50% more. In contrast, traditional backpackers have base weights of 6.8 to 13.6 kg (15 to 30 lb), and in some cases (usually winter trips, extended trips in varying conditions, and multi-purpose trips requiring additional gear such as photography, fishing, and climbing) as much as 25 kg (55 lb) or more.

== History ==
Ultralight backpacking was popularized by American rock climber Ray Jardine, whose 1992 book PCT Hiker's Handbook, later retitled as Beyond Backpacking in 1999, laid the foundations for many techniques that ultralight backpackers use today. Jardine claimed his first Pacific Crest Trail thru-hike was with a base weight of 5.7 kg (13 lb), and by his third PCT thru-hike it was below 4.5 kg (9.9 lb).

Before modern equipment made it possible for ultralight hikers to buy most of their light-weight gear, there were hikers who adhered to an "ultralight" mentality. In the late 1800s, George W. Sears (a.k.a. "Nessmuk") hiked and paddled through the Appalachian territory with only a waxed canvas tarpaulin, walking stick / ridgepole, a small pan, and his trademark dual-bladed hatchet. He laid the foundations of ultra-light backpacking in his concise 1884 book, Woodcraft, which is still in print today.

Another 'early pioneer' was Grandma Gatewood, who thru-hiked the Appalachian Trail in 1955 with only a duffel bag containing an army blanket, a plastic sheet, an umbrella, and other very simple gear that was much lighter than the heavy equipment common among hikers in those days.

== Industry and manufacturers ==
In addition to individual practitioners, the development of ultralight backpacking has been influenced by small-scale specialized manufacturers, often referred to as "cottage manufacturers", producing lightweight gear in limited quantities. This segment has been particularly prominent in the United States, where the ultralight movement originated and where long-distance trails such as the Pacific Crest Trail and Appalachian Trail have supported demand for minimalist equipment. As a result, many well-known cottage manufacturers are based in the U.S. In Europe, similar manufacturers exist but are fewer in number and more regionally distributed. European companies often emphasize durability and performance in varied alpine and climatic conditions, reflecting differences in terrain and usage patterns. Access to this type of equipment in Europe is also shaped by specialized retailers, which aggregate products from both domestic and international manufacturers and make them available within the European market. These regional distinctions contribute to differing design approaches, availability, and product characteristics within the global ultralight gear market.

In Asia, in particular Japan and Korea, a rather large number of small and medium manufacturers have emerged in the last 10-15 years with brands such as Yamatomichi, Locus Gear and Cayl worth mentioning. The yearly Off the Grid held in Machida, Japan brings together the industry where new products are shared among the community.

== Philosophy and process ==
Ultralight backpackers believe a lower base weight allows them to cover longer distances and reduce stress on their bodies. This is particularly beneficial when thru-hiking a long-distance trail. However, gear made from some light high-performance materials (such as titanium, goose down and DCF) can be more expensive and less durable. Proponents might use the following steps.

1. Weigh everything. Weigh every item and record its weight. This helps identify items with potential for weight reduction.
2. Reduce each item's weight. Modify items to reduce weight, such as removing brand tags and cutting toothbrush handles.
3. Ration. Carry the minimal amount of consumables needed for a trip. This includes food, fuel and toiletries.
4. Use group gear. Share items if backpacking with others. For example, a group of three may only require a single shelter and cook system. This gear can then be divided among the group.
5. Lighten your feet. Sandals and trail-running shoes are usually lighter than hiking boots.
6. Multi-purpose gear. Use single items for multiple tasks. For example, a poncho can also be used as a shelter, and trekking poles can be used as tent poles. A bandana can have many uses.
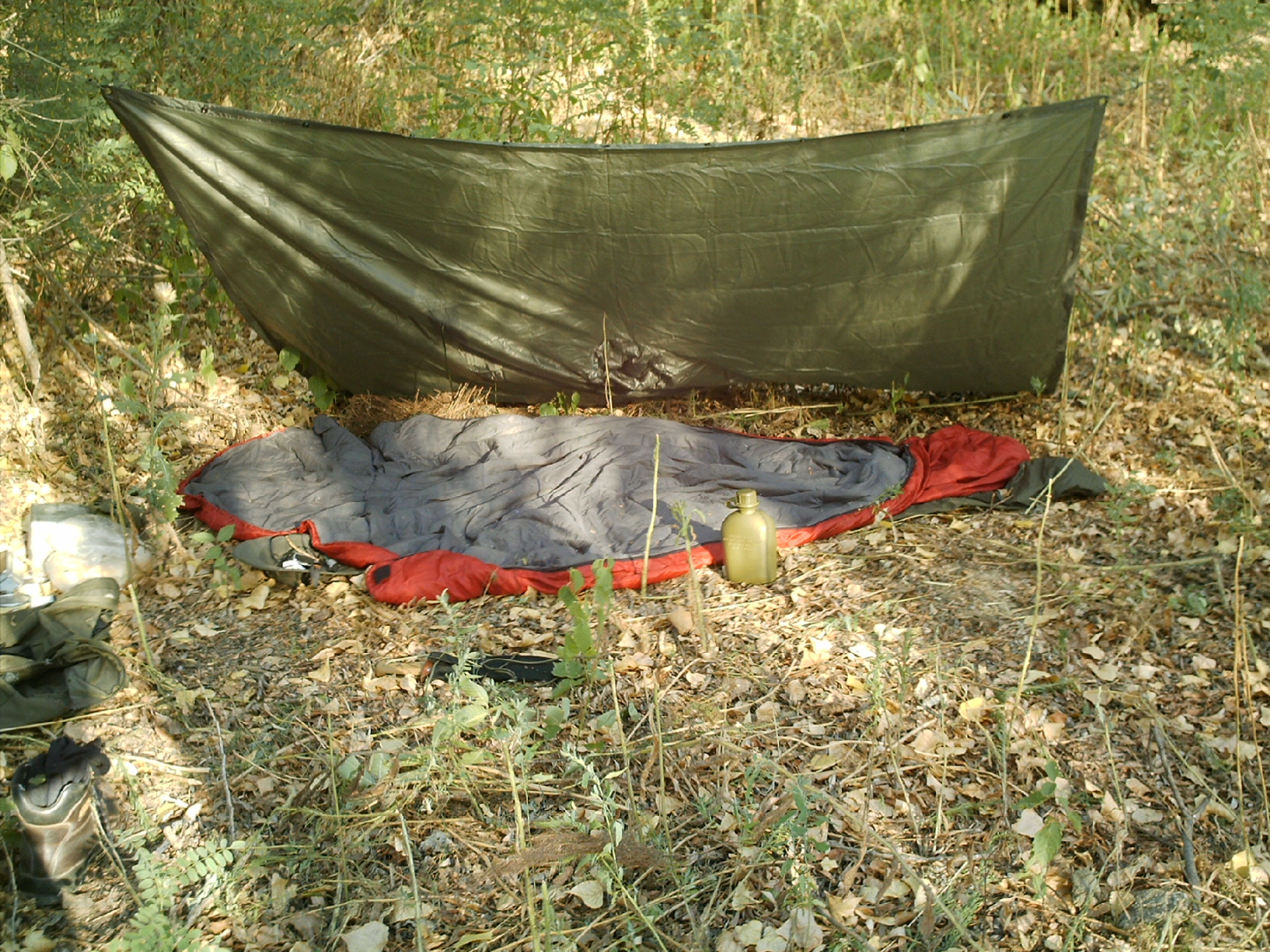
  Poncho shelter
7. Swap gear for skills. Learn skills that can replace equipment. For example, by knowing where to find water, a hiker need not carry as much.
8. Replace gear. Purchase ultralight gear. This can be expensive but can offer significant weight reductions. Commonly, an ultralight backpacker will start by lightening their 'big three' - their shelter, sleep system, and backpack. Tents can be replaced with tarps or bivouacs (bivy), sleeping bags with down quilts and inflatable mattresses with foam pads.
9. Carry less. Omit unnecessary items. For example, multiple changes of clothing.

== The 'big three' ==
A hiker's shelter, sleeping system, and backpack are considered to be the three major items for weight reduction.

=== Shelter ===
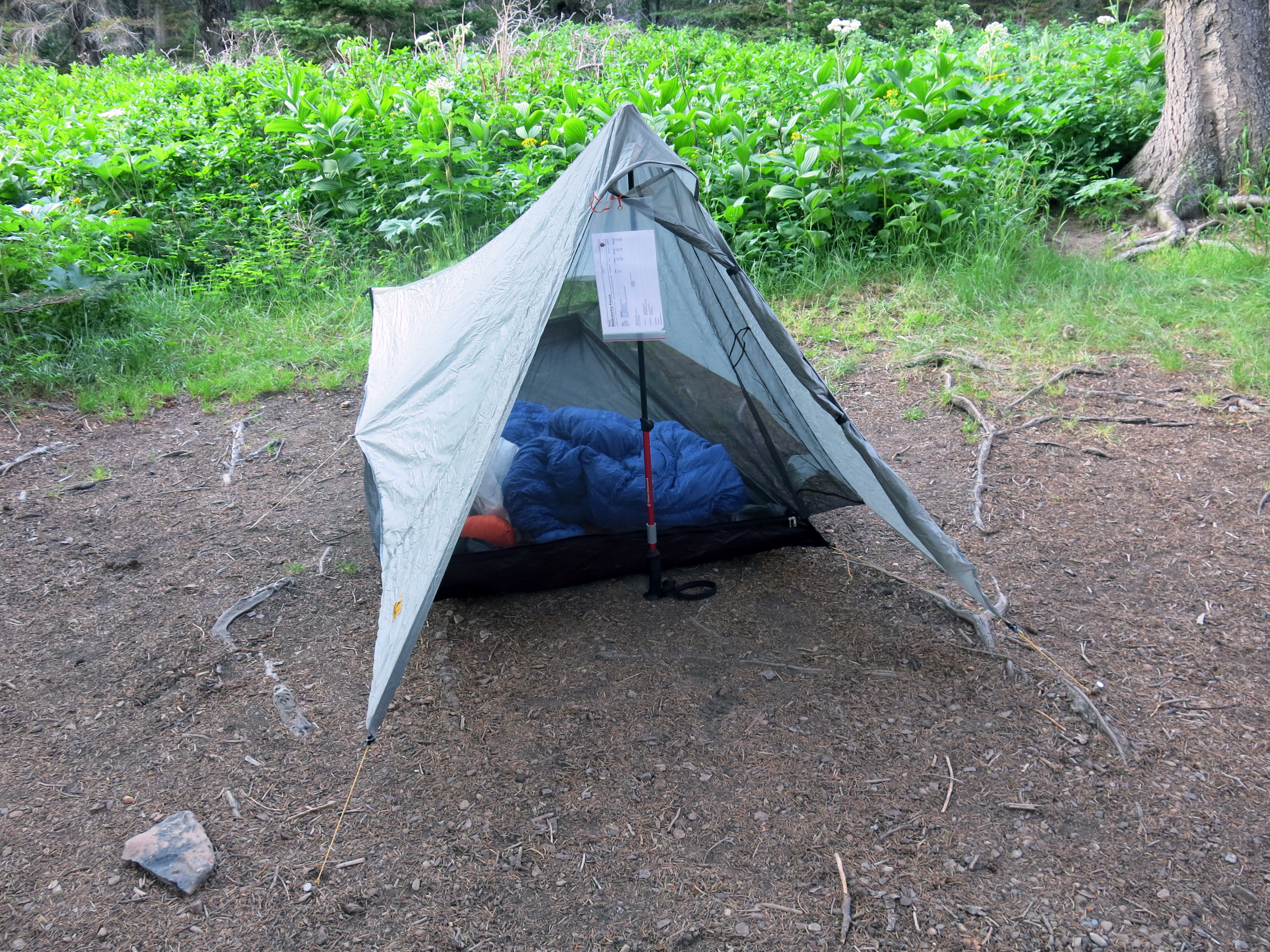
Many ultralight backpackers use a non-freestanding system where the trekking pole serves as the structure for the tent.

Tents, hammocks, and tarps with bivy sacks are used by long-distance hikers to protect themselves from insects and weather. Of these, tents are the most common. The development of very lightweight silicone-coated fabrics have allowed manufacturers to produce very lightweight tents. The lightest tents are single wall, but even some double wall tents are very light weight. Weight can be further reduced by using poncho-tarps, or a bivy sack ("Alpine style") as the sole shelter. Generally as weight decreases, the skill needed to shelter safely increases.

=== Sleeping system ===
Ultralight backpackers might opt for foam sleeping pads, which are usually lighter than inflatable mattresses, and rest their head on clothing or other gear rather than carry a pillow.

Narrow 'mummy-style' quilts and sleeping bags are lighter than traditional rectangular-shaped items. Down is lighter than synthetic fibers for insulation, but is susceptible to loft loss caused by moisture. Some quilts are bottom-less, relying on the user's sleeping pad to guard against cold ground. A top bag is more like a conventional sleeping bag in that it wraps around the user's entire body but the bottom fabric contains no insulation. The idea is that bottom insulation is compressed by a person's body, rendering any loft in that area useless. Some modern down sleeping bags are through-baffled and under-filled such that the user can shift all the insulation to the top of their body thereby maximizing its potential to retain heat. Ultralight hikers also tend to carry bags rated for warmer temperatures than traditional-weight backpackers, making up the difference on cold nights by wearing clothes to bed, such as a balaclava or jacket. Careful camping site selection can avoid colder "hollows" (low points where cold air tends to collect) or make use of natural wind barriers such as thick vegetation to compensate for less-warm gear.

=== Backpack ===
With a lighter shelter and sleeping system, the backpack can consist of lighter material and a less bulky frame or no frame at all. A common ultralight alternative to an internal frame pack is a frameless pack made of ripstop nylon, silnylon, or ultra-high-molecular-weight polyethylene with a carrying limit of around 11 kg (24 lb). A large internal-frame pack will usually weigh more than 1 kg (2.2 lb), with features such as hip belts, lifter straps, sternum straps, and compression straps. Ultralight frameless packs can weigh as little as 200 to 400 g (7.1 to 14.1 oz) and can consist of not much more than a sack with shoulder straps. Jardine's book includes directions to make your own "ultralight pack".

Some backpackers make their own gear. Advantages include possible reduction of cost and the opportunity to customize the gear to the individual user. Additionally, if a homemade item fails, the hiker will know how to repair it. Lastly, commercial manufacturers often choose heavier, more durable material for their products in order to reduce the amount of care and maintenance required of the user (and minimize returns of damaged gear). With care, homemade lightweight gear can last as long as necessary.

=== Other gear ===
The remaining gear (such as ten essentials and survival kit) carried by an ultralight backpacker follows a similar philosophy of replacing traditional backpacking gear with lighter options. Replacements might include:

- Making a fire instead of carrying a stove.
- Light weight alcohol stoves such as a beverage can stove or solid fuel stoves instead of heavier gas stoves.
- Single cook pot ("billycan") with a single spoon instead of a traditional mess kit
- Going stove-less, eating cold food, including cold soak foods such as couscous, rice noodles and oatmeal.
- Sandals, trail running or running shoes instead of hiking boots, and lightweight nylon socks instead of heavy wool socks.
- A minimal amount of extra clothing.
- Plastic or silnylon bags instead of heavier stuff-sacks.
- A razor blade or a light 28 g (1 oz) small pocket knife instead of a heavier multi-tool.
- Chemical disinfectant water treatment (iodine tablets, chlorine dioxide) instead of heavier water filters.
- Plastic soft drink or soft plastic bottles instead of heavier Nalgene or Lexan bottles or hydration packs.
- Using a phone's navigation apps rather than carrying a map and compass.
- Carrying a plastic poncho instead of a waterproof jacket, or omitting rain gear altogether.
- Wearing layers of lightweight clothes to replace heavy, single-layer insulation.

== Consumables ==
In addition to carrying equipment, hikers must also carry consumables such as water and food, and in some cases fuel. Some ultralight backpackers save weight by resupplying these items more frequently. On long-distance trails with multiple access points, some ultralight hikers choose to place food caches or stop at stores to resupply consumables at frequent intervals, allowing just two or three days' worth of food to be carried in place of a larger load.

=== Water ===
Water can be a significant contributor to pack weight because moderate activity in a moderate climate requires 2 L (2.1 US qt) of drinking water per day, with a weight of 2 kg (4.4 lb). When traveling through an area with many springs and streams, some ultralight hikers can carry as little as 350 mL (12 US fl oz) of water, or none at all, provided the hiker is confident on how far away the next reliable water source is and the expected weather conditions, but in other regions hikers must carry all their water requirements, and can only minimize the container weight.

Some ultralight hikers reduce the weight of water purifying devices, carried to prevent waterborne diseases such as giardiasis, cryptosporidiosis and dysentery, by carrying lighter disinfectants instead of filters or ultraviolet (UV) treatment devices.

=== Food ===
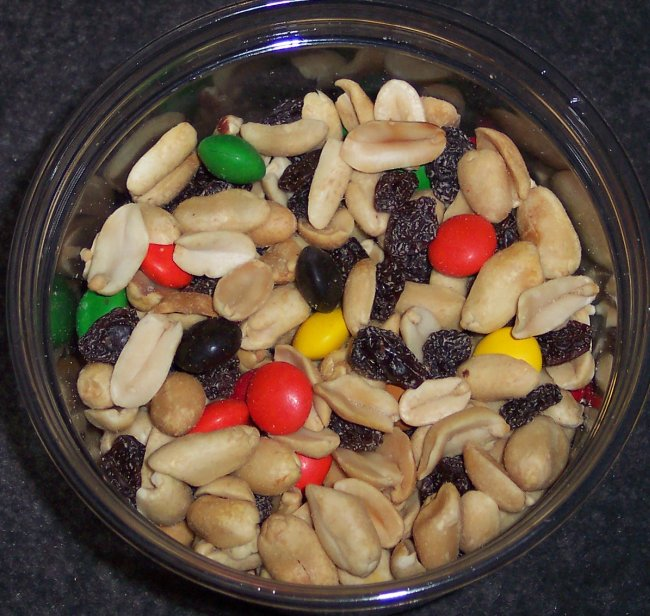
A common variety of trail mix made out of peanuts, raisins, and candy coated chocolate, around 4.8 kcal/gram

After shelter, a sleeping system, the backpack and water, food is the biggest contributor to pack weight and an area where substantial gains over traditional backpacking can be made.

The basal metabolic rate requirement of food calories (one food calorie is 1000 heat calories, thus sometimes labelled kcal) is approximately 1000 per day per 45kg (100 pounds) of body weight. However hiking consumes additional calories; for example the standard US Army field ration is 4500 kcal per day for strenuous work. Thus depending upon type of food an average hiker carries, a hiker requires approximately 2 kg (4.4 lb) of food per day. Ultralight techniques can substantially reduce this weight, Jardine suggests 1.1 kg (2.5 lb) per day for thru-hiking, Jordan suggests 0.57 kg (1.25 lb) per day (at 125 calories per ounce, 4.4 calories per gram) for a 3-season 3-day backpack.

Many foods can be dried or dehydrated to reduce water weight. Dehydrated meals can be purchased or dehydrated at home. On the trail, rehydration can typically be performed by cooking in hot water. Some ultralight hikers reduce weight by not carrying a stove, and instead, rehydrate food in a container with ambient-temperature water (although this method requires more time to rehydrate than the traditional cooking method). For example, Ramen noodles, dehydrated refried beans (in powdered form), or dehydrated hummus can be put in a ziploc bag or lightweight microwave disposable plastic container with water to rehydrate. Oats (groats or rolled, granola or muesli) and barley also become soft enough with soaking to eat uncooked as a raw food. Tsampa is a simple, bland and lightweight dish made from flour, and has been used for centuries by wandering Tibetan monks.

Weight can also be reduced by choosing calorie-dense foods. Proteins and carbohydrates have approximately 4 kcal per gram, fat has 9 kcal per gram and water has 0 kcal, thus carrying foods low in water and high in fat content can reduce weight, such as:

- Olive oil (8.8 kcal/gram)
- Peanut butter (5.89 kcal/gram)
- Nuts (pecans are 6.87 kcal/gram, toasted coconut is 5.92 kcal/gram)
- Pemican (5.7 kcal/gram)
- Dried whole egg (5.92 kcal/gram)

Clarified butter (anhydrous), which stores sell unrefrigerated, is almost pure fat (8.76 kcal/gram), thus about 4,000 kcal per pound; however, it is also a potent bear attractant.

Energy bars on average contain more protein and carbohydrates than fat, similar to a Fig Newton (3.68 kcal/gram), which lowers their calorie to weight ratio relative to other choices.

=== Food protection ===
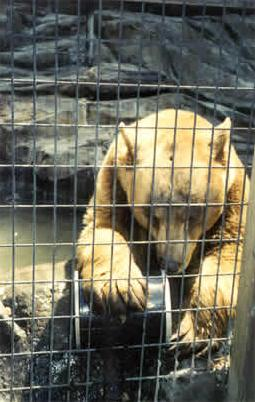
A captive bear tests a food canister

In some parts of the United States an approved bear-resistant food storage container is a required item for hikers, which will add between 710 g (1 lb 9 oz) and 1.4 kg (3 lb 2 oz) to the base pack weight. These areas include parts of Yosemite National Park, Rocky Mountain National Park and the Eastern High Peaks Zone.

== See also ==
- Camping
- Campfire
- Campsite
- Fabrics:
  - Units of textile measurement
  - Cotton
  - Linen
  - Silk
  - Synthetic fiber
  - Wool
  - Dyneema
- Fire
  - Bow drill
  - Firelighting
  - Firesteel
  - Lighter
- Food
  - Nutrition
  - Camping food
  - Outdoors cooking
  - Backpacking-wilderness food
  - Survival-skills food
- Hammock
- Hammock camping
- Heated clothes
- Hiking
- Hiking equipment
- Knot
- Leave No Trace
- Survival skills
  - Mini survival kits
  - Survival kit
  - Survivalism
- Ten Essentials
- Scout Outdoor Essentials
- Search and rescue
- Tent
  - Altitude tent
  - Tarp tent
- Wilderness backpacking
  - Fastpacking
- Water
  - Drinking water
  - Portable water purification
  - Solar water disinfection
  - Water filter
  - Water supply
- Wilderness diarrhea
