= Snow knife =

Inuit tool

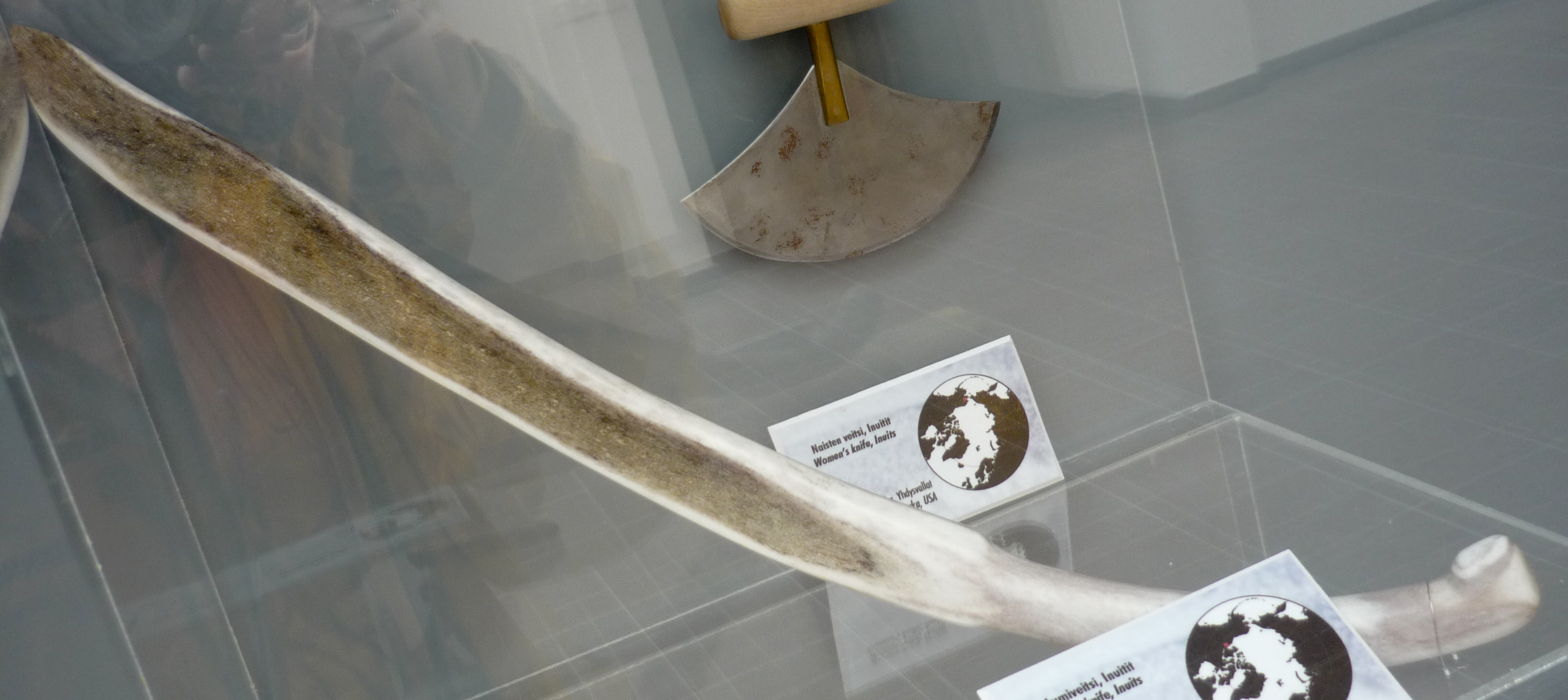
A bone snow knife with an ulu in the background

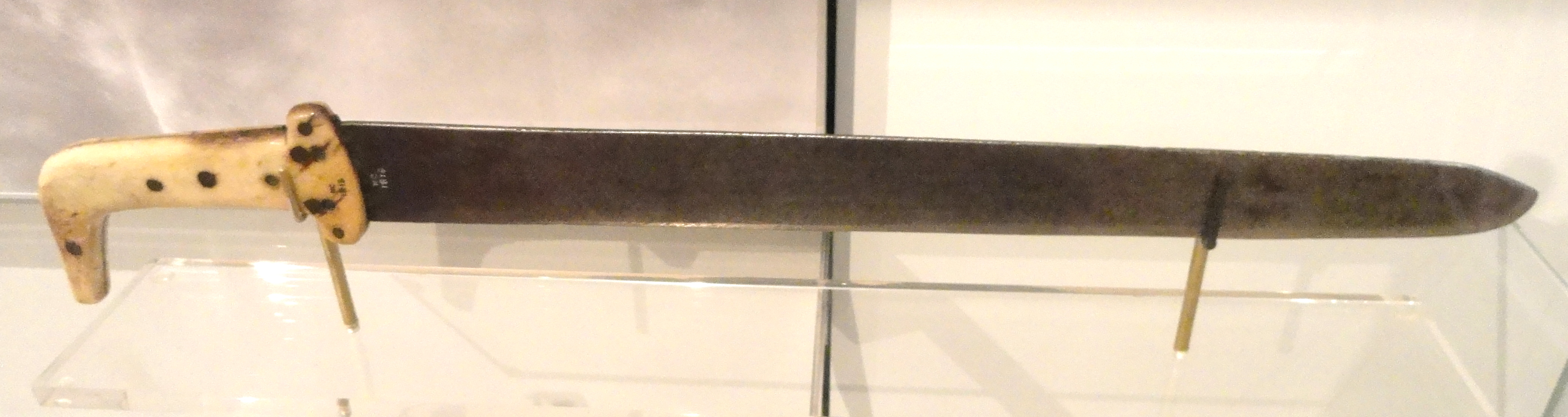
A metal-bladed snow knife

A snow knife or snow saw (Inuktitut: pana) is a tool used in the construction of igluit (snow houses) or as a weapon by Inuit of the Arctic. The snow knife was originally made from available materials such as bone or horn but the Inuit adapted to using metal after the arrival of Europeans. It may also be used for digging for berries or as a prop in storytelling.

== Historical descriptions ==
The American Association for the Advancement of Science noted in 1883:

The only instrument used in the construction of the igloo is the snow-knife. Where the Inuits [sic] have intercourse with white men, they barter for cheese-knives or long-bladed butcher-knives, remove the double-handle from the tang, and put on a single one about three times as long, which can be readily grasped by both hands. The old knives were made of reindeer-horn or from the shin-bone of the reindeer.

Among the Esquimaux in and around King William's Land I found snow-knives made of copper stripped from Sir John Franklin's ships, the imprints of the queen's broad arrow still showing on many, the blades double-edged or dagger-shape, and the handles of musk-ox and reindeer horn rudely attached by sinew lashings.

The snow-knife of iron, while more convenient in many ways, is far more liable to break in the intense cold of the winter weather, such accidents with them being very common. I have seen igloos built when the thermometer registered −70°F. At such temperatures the snow becomes almost stone-like in its compactness. The snow-knife is often used as a substitute for the snow-tester whenever that instrument is broken or left behind, for the Esquimaux are a very careless and absentminded people.

== See also ==
- Tomahawk
- Ulu
