= Tom Brown Jr. =

American survivalist (1950–2024)

- Born: Thomas Haughey Brown Jr. January 29, 1950; Toms River, New Jersey, U.S.
- Died: August 16, 2024 (aged 74); Neptune, New Jersey, U.S.
- Occupations: Naturalist, tracker, survivalist, author
- Employer: Tom Brown Jr.'s Tracker School
- Notable work: The Tracker (1978)
- Website: https://www.trackerschool.com/

Thomas Haughey Brown Jr. (January 29, 1950 – August 16, 2024) was an American naturalist, tracker, survivalist, and author from New Jersey, where he ran the Tom Brown Jr. Tracker School.

== Early life ==
Brown was born in Toms River, New Jersey on January 29, 1950, and raised in nearby Beachwood. From the age of seven, as Brown wrote in his books, he and his childhood friend Rick were trained in tracking and wilderness survival by Rick's grandfather, "Stalking Wolf" (who Brown stated was Lipan Apache). Brown wrote that Stalking Wolf died when Brown was 17, and that Rick was killed in an accident in Europe shortly thereafter.

== Career ==
Brown spent the next ten years working odd jobs to support his wilderness adventures. He then set out to find other people in New Jersey who were interested in his experiences. Initially Brown met with little success, but was eventually called on to help locate a crime suspect. Though the case won him national attention, he and authorities in the Ramsey, New Jersey area were subsequently sued for 5 million dollars for charging the wrong person. Despite this controversy, he was able to build on this exposure to develop a profession as a full-time tracker, advertising his services for locating lost persons, dangerous animals, and fugitives from the law. According to People magazine, "He stalks men and animals, mostly in New Jersey." The New York Times said that he "was considered the country's foremost authority on wilderness survival".

=== The Tracker School ===
Tom Brown Jr.'s Tracker School is located in the New Jersey Pine Barrens. Most classes offered by Tracker School are held in Primitive Camp or Joseph Citta Boy Scout Camp, both of which are located near Waretown, New Jersey. However, classes are also offered in California and Florida. Workshops involve Brown's versions of Plains Indian ceremonies, including the sweat lodge and vision quest.

== Personal life and death ==
In July 1977, Tom Brown Jr. married Judy Duck Ford, 33. At the time Judy had a daughter Kerry, 15, and a son Paul, 11, from a previous marriage. The two had one child, Tom Brown III, together. Brown later married Debbie Brown and had two children with her, Coty Tracker Brown and River Scout Brown. Later, Brown married his third wife, Celeste Brown.

Brown died in Neptune, New Jersey, on August 16, 2024, at the age of 74.

== Publications and media ==
Brown has written 18 books. His first book The Tracker, in 1978, chronicled his coming of age. Reader's Digest printed a condensed version of the story and provided information about Brown's new Tracker School. Tom Brown's books are published by Penguin Books:

- The Tracker (1978, 1986), ISBN 978-0-42-510133-9
- The Search (1980, 2001), ISBN 978-0-42-518181-2
- Field Guide to Living With the Earth (1984), ISBN 0-425-09147-3
- Guide to Wild Edible and Medicinal Plants (1986), ISBN 978-0-42-510063-9
- Guide to City and Suburban Survival (1986), ISBN 978-0-425-09172-2
- Field Guide to Living with the Earth (1986), ISBN 978-0-42-509147-0
- Field Guide to Nature Observation and Tracking (1986), ISBN 978-0-42-509966-7
- Field Guide to the Forgotten Wilderness (1987), ISBN 978-0-42-509715-1
- Field Guide to Wilderness Survival (1987), ISBN 978-0-42-510572-6
- The Vision (1988), ISBN 978-0-42-510703-4
- Field Guide to Nature and Survival for Children (1989), ISBN 978-0-42-511106-2
- The Quest (1991), ISBN 0-425-12660-9
- The Journey (1992), ISBN 0-425-13364-8
- Grandfather (1993, 2001), ISBN 978-0-42-518174-4, audio book (2007)
- Awakening Spirits (1994), ISBN 978-0-42-514140-3
- The Way of the Scout (1995), ISBN 0-425-14779-7
- The Science and Art of Tracking (1999), ISBN 978-0-42-515772-5
- Case Files of the Tracker (2003), ISBN 978-0-42-518755-5
- Guide to Healing the Earth (2019), ISBN 978-0-42-525738-8

The Mother Earth News website provides these articles by Tom Brown Jr.:

- Issue 71, Sep–Oct 1981: Wilderness Shelter
- Issue 72, Nov–Dec 1981: Finding Water
- Issue 73, Jan–Feb 1982: Fire Starting
- Issue 74, Mar–Apr 1982: Hunting & Traps
- Issue 75, May–Jun 1982: Edible Plants
- Issue 76, Jul–Aug 1982: Survival Cooking
- Issue 77, Sep–Oct 1982: Animal Tracking
- Issue 79, Jan–Feb 1983: Natural Cordage
- Issue 87, May–Jun 1984: Bow Making
- Issue 93, May–Jun 1985: Survival Skills
- Issue 95, Sep–Oct 1985: Advanced Shelters
- CBS News reports: 24 June 2005 6 December 2006

== See also ==
- Ernest Thompson Seton
