= Trail running shoe =

Footwear for long-distanced or cross-country running

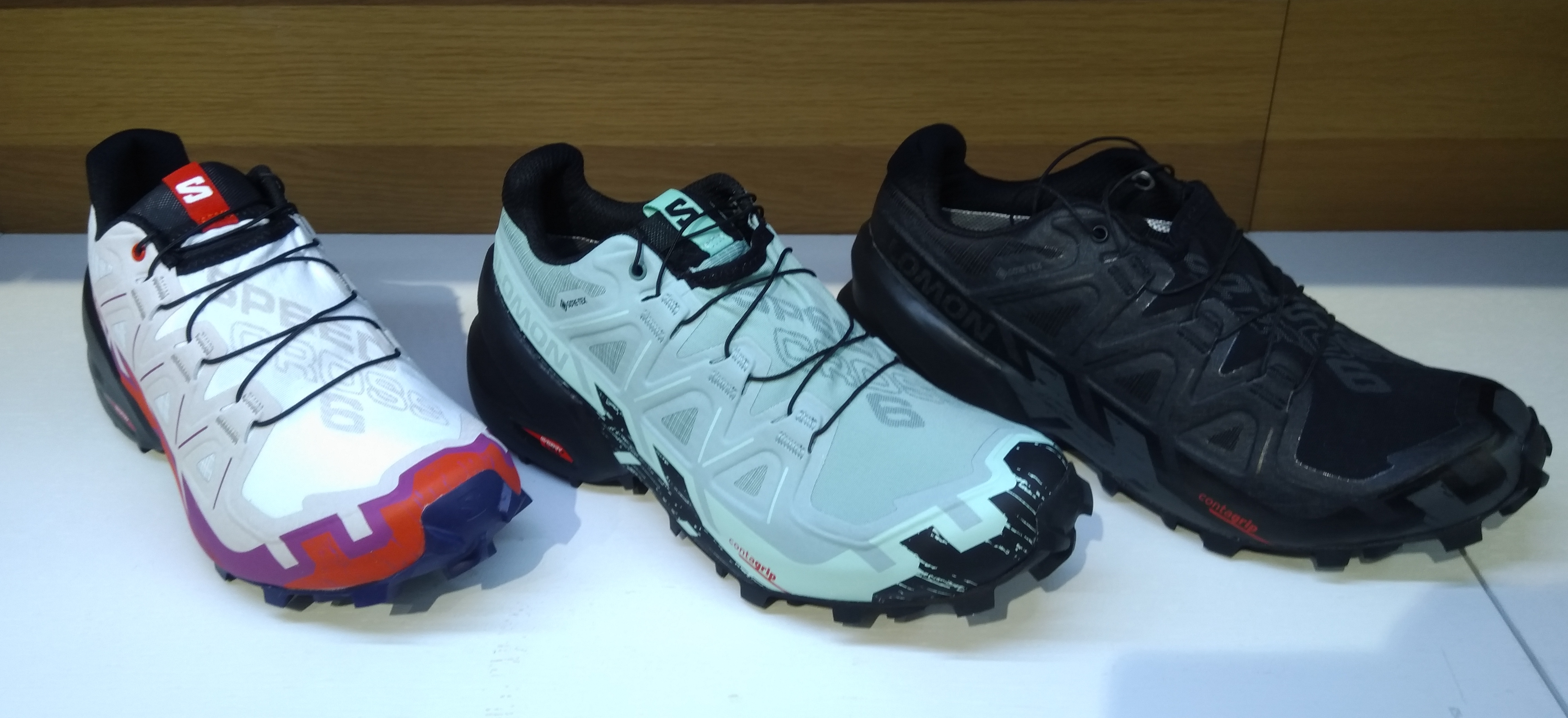
Trail running shoes

Trail running shoes are designed for trail running, featuring midsole padding to reduce impact and lugs designed for traction on rough trails and mud. Although designed for running, they are also used by hikers, including fastpackers and ultralight backpackers.

== Anatomy ==
- Lugs - Raised rubber shapes on the bottom of a shoe's outsole which is designed to provide traction and grip. They are typically measured in millimetres. Shoes with deeper lugs (5mm and above) provide better traction on wet and muddy terrain, while shoes with shorter lugs (2—4mm) allows runners to run on roads and firmer surfaces, with relatively greater comfort while still providing sufficient grip on trails.

== Cross Country running ==
Cross-country races vary in length and terrain. They are most often run at 5K, 6000 meters, 8000 meters, 10K, and 12,000 meters, though many races for children are shorter. During training season, professional runners can run anywhere from 40 to 120 miles each week, depending on preference, training method, and ability to remain healthy. While the impacts of differences among types of footwear may be minimal on a single run, the cumulative effect on performance and health can provide a competitive edge. Races are held on surfaces including gravel, grass, dirt or mud, sand, and asphalt (though racing on asphalt is not normally recommended).

== Shoe types ==
When training, trainers with support and cushioning are recommended as unsupportive shoes without cushion can potentially cause repetitive stress injuries if used over a long period of time. For speed workouts, often held on tracks, lighter shoes with less cushioning and support may be used.

Racing shoes are lighter (around 5 ounces) and have 4-6 spikes or "pins", which help with traction on hills and wet terrain. They have less cushion than trainers, are less supportive, and often utilize a springy spike plate made of rubber or Pebax. In more recent shoe technology development, a carbon plate has been incorporated into the design of spikes. A rock plate to protect from rock bite.

== Comparisons ==
Cross-country spikes are more robust than track spikes. They must deal more with the elements and natural objects, like sticks and rocks. The upper is thicker, therefore, and can be water-proof. They often have more cushioning and heel support because of the stress of downhill running. In addition, they can have longer spikes (anywhere from 1/4 in. to 5/8 in.) for better traction, as they are used on natural terrain that is affected by weather and can include hills.

== Fitting ==
Specialist shops offer advanced fitting services. The feet change shape and swell when running, so a shoe that fits while sitting or walking may not work for running.

== Preparing new shoes ==
When wearing new shoes for the first time, it is crucial to ensure they are “broken in” by wearing them in undemanding situations (walking, slow running) to lessen the chance of injury.

== Potential injuries ==
Common running injuries include blisters, twisted ankles, knee injuries, and shin splints.

== See also ==
- List of shoe styles
- Approach shoe
