= Mini survival kit =

Small kit containing essential survival tools

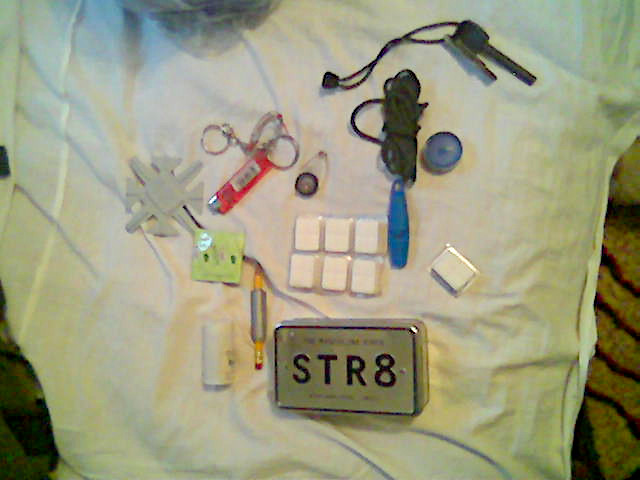
A mini survival kit kept in a medium tin box

A mini survival kit contains essential outdoor survival tools and supplies. It is intended to be carried on one's person at all times, be appropriate to all environments, and be a comprehensive kit without being too large. Mini survival kits are intended to provide the basic needs of a survival situation, self-rescue, assistance or a return to normalcy in optimum situations.

Two philosophies surround the preparation of mini survival kits. Some are prepared with a few comparatively large items such as a knife, matches, a whistle, emergency food, and water bottle. Others are a collection of small, useful items such as rubber bands, paper clips, fishing equipment, lashing material, and razor blades. The technique depends on factors such as one's physical condition, survival skills, and wilderness knowledge.

== Container ==
Survival tools and supplies found in a mini survival kit are generally kept in a container that is small enough to fit into a pocket. Small confectionery tins are commonly used but regular tobacco boxes, specially purchased mini-survival kit tins, life capsules, 35mm film canisters, plastic bottles, tin cans, and boxes are also commonly used. The common breath mint containers such as Altoids tins measure approximately 9.3 cm (3.7 in) x 5.8 cm (2.3 in) x 2.1 cm (0.83 in). Some kinds of containers benefit from waterproofing, which may be done with adhesive tape or by dipping the closed container in paraffin wax.

Mini-survival-kit items can be carried on a neck chain, a satchel, a pouch or a belt kit pouch. Survival items may also be part of the belt kit itself.

== Contents ==
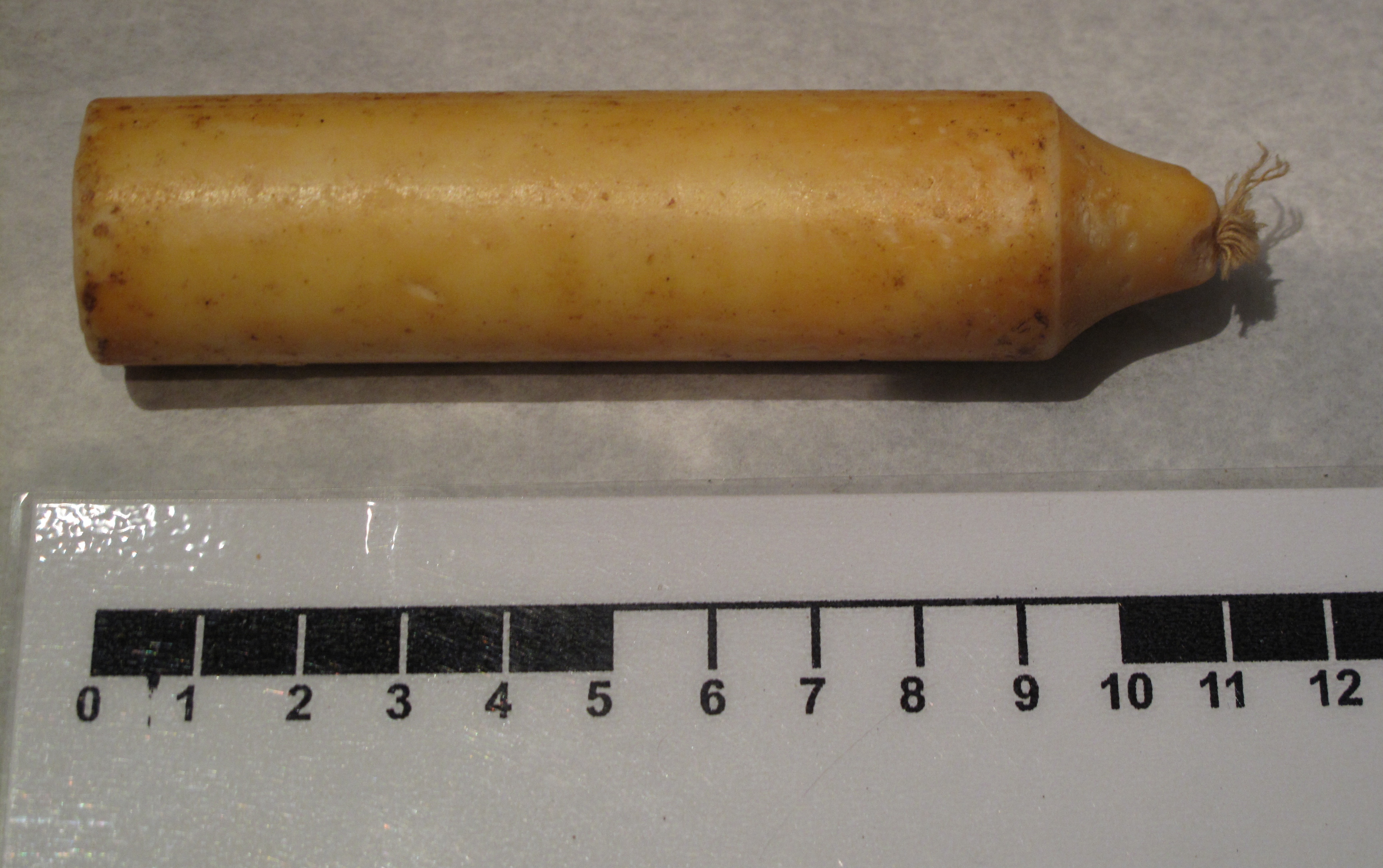
A tallow candle

Because each kit depends on the situation and environment of the user, they can vary greatly. Listed below are common items one might find in a mini survival kit:

- Small fire sources such as butane lighters, matches, tinder and ferrocerium rod or "life boat matches" and striker board;
- Signal devices (LED micro lights, small heliographs or survival whistles);
- Candles, which can be used for emergency food if made from tallow;
- Cutting tools, such as flexible wire, collapsible saws, or pocket knives;
- String, fishing line, wire, finishing nails, and safety pins for tying off or affixing shelter materials;

=== Food and water procurement ===
- Fishing line and assorted fishing hooks;
- Snare wire; malleable copper or brass wire is often used, as well as steel 'trip wire' or utility wire;
- Dental floss for use as string;
- Water purification bags, items that occupy the amount of space as transpiration collection bags will not fit in such a kit as a mini-kit (small tobacco tin or altoids tin as pictured in the article) however could be carried separate from this type of kit referred to in Survival Evasion, Resistant and Escape literature SERE as [worn on the body]:often used to keep tinder dry or for water storage / transportation;
- Glucose tablets or hard candy;
- Water purification sources, including chemical purification means such as Potassium permanganate or bleach;
- Non-lubricated condoms, used for their capability to expand to store a large quantity of water.

=== Navigation ===
- Button-sized compass;
- Magnetized needle and thread to use a makeshift compass;

=== First aid ===
- Wound treatment and antiseptic, such as potassium permanganate or iodine tablets
- Scalpel or utility knife blades for minor surgery and fine work
- Plasters and bandages
- Cyanoacrylate glue is adaptable to the size and shape of injury
- Prescription medication for pain, such as Paracetamol or Vicoden

=== Miscellaneous ===
In addition to the items marked above, the following items are also frequently found in many mini-survival kits (depending on the area the operator is expecting to be in, personal experience, multiple use considerations, serviceability, and durability). In some kits, certain items marked above can also have been completely replaced by certain items below. Items and many of their uses are listed along with alternative uses and/or alternative items to perform the role in the kit.

- Tweezers
- Files
- Information cards
- Candle kit components
- Rubbing alcohol, wipes or Povidone-Iodine Prep Pads
- Needles or sewing awls and yarn
- Butterfly closures
- Braided nylon cords
- Waterproof paper
- Plastic bags
- Compressed sponges
- Aluminium foil
- Baking soda
- Electrical tape
- Parachute cord
- Sharpening stone
- Systemic analgesics such as aspirin or paracetamol
- Anti-malaria tablets
- Broad spectrum antibiotics such as Azithromycin
- Antihistamine, for first aid against insect bites/stings and allergies
- Anti-diarrhea medication such as Loperamide
- Tritium or Superluminova kit markers
- Magnifying glasses or Fresnel lenses

== See also ==
- Tool
- Bushcraft
- Hiking equipment
- Survival kit
- Repair kit
- Survival skills
- Machine element
- Electrical element
- Electronic component
- List of martial arts weapons
- Lists of weapons
