= List of human habitation forms =

This is a list of permanent, semi-permanent, mobile and miscelleneous types of human habitation. Such an exhaustive list is at times used for national census, where counting every human, however housed or not housed, is mandatory.

== Permanent ==
- Barracks, may also be mobile, a cantonment or military camp
- Bed and breakfast, or B&B (French: Chambre d'hôtes)
- Boarding house
- Bothy
- Bungalow
- Castle
- Cave
  - Yaodong
- Chalet
- Château
- Choultry
- Condominium
- Converted barn
- Cottage
- Domus
- Dormitory
- Dugout
- Earth house
- Earth sheltering
- Farm stay
- Flophouse
- Guest house
- Hospitality service, or hospitality exchange
- Hostal
- Hostel
- Hotel
  - Apartment hotel
  - Boutique hotel
  - Capsule hotel
  - Casino hotel
  - Love hotel
- House, or home
- Housebarn
- Housing tenure or rented accommodation
  - Apartment
  - Bedsit
  - Communal apartment
  - Council house
  - Flatshare, also called shared housing or shared accommodation
  - Public housing
  - Share house
  - Single room occupancy
  - Tenancy
- Hut
  - Slab hut
- Inn
- Insula
- Log cabin
- Log house
- Longhouse
- Mansion
- Mini dorm
- Moroccan riad
- Motel
- Nursing home
- Orphanage
- Palace
- Pension
- Pit-house
- Prison
  - Cell
- Public house
  - Inn
- Retirement home
- Rooming house
- Roundhouse
- Ryokan, a traditional Japanese inn
- Safari lodge
- Sanatorium
- Sod house
- Stilt house
- Timeshare
- Tree house
- Turbaza
- Underground living
- Vacation rental
- Villa

== Semi-permanent ==
- Beach hut
- Bivouac shelter
- Emergency shelter
- Igloo
- Lean-to
- Mobile home
- Ramada
- Snow cave
- Tent city
- Quinzhee

== Mobile ==
- Bender tent
- Campervan
- Campsite
- Houseboat, including float houses
- Mobile home
- Portable building
- Recreational vehicle
- RV park
- Tent
- Travel trailer

=== Traditional tent types ===
- Bell tent
- Chum
- Fly
- Goahti
- Kohte
- Lavvu
- Loue
- Nomadic tents
- Pandal
- Sibley tent
- Tarp tent
- Tipi
- Wigwam
- Yurt

== See also ==
- Building
- Buy to let
- Dwelling
- Habitation (disambiguation)
- House in multiple occupation
- List of building types
- Lists of buildings and structures
- List of house types
- Lodging
- Modular building
- Open-source architecture
- Prefabricated building
- Sanctuary
- Shed
- Shelter
- Single-room occupancy
- Vernacular architecture
