= 2022 Suriname floods =

Natural disaster in Suriname

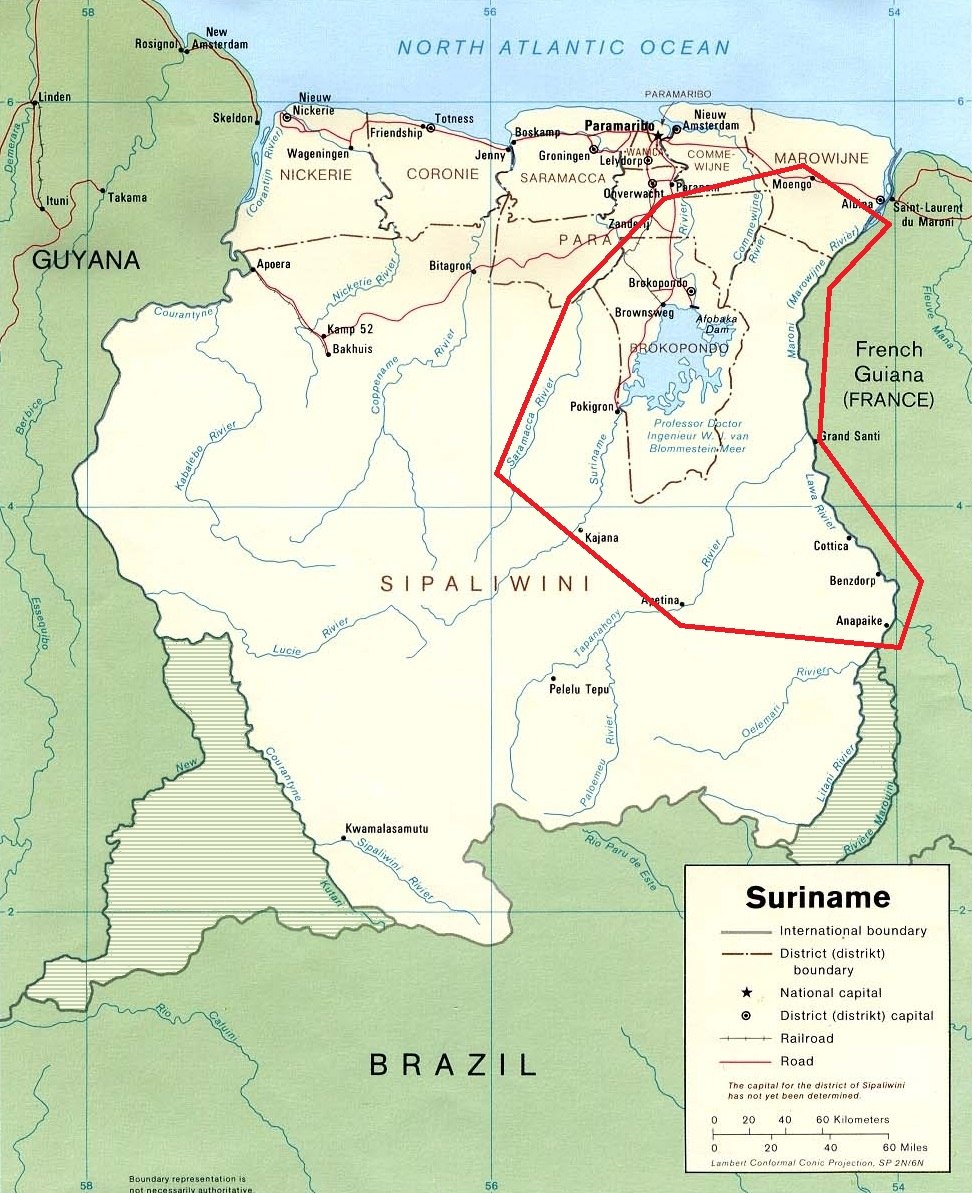
- Affected regions
- Date: March 9–15, 2022
- Location: East Suriname
- Type: Flooding

The 2022 Suriname floods were a series of floods that occurred in March 2022. They primarily affected Indigenous and Maroon settlement areas in the eastern part of Suriname. The floods were caused by the La Niña weather phenomenon, which replaced the short dry season (beginning of February to beginning of April) in 2022.

== Background ==
In the first two months of 2022, there was persistent heavy rainfall. This was unusual for Suriname, since February and March are part of the short dry season. However, due to the weather phenomenon La Niña, the dry season was not observed, and the rains have continued to fall.

To prevent the water level of the Brokopondo Reservoir from rising further, the Staatsolie Power Company Suriname N.V. (SPCS) opened the outlet valves of the Afobaka Dam on 28 February. The releases were carried out at intervals to prevent disruption in the villages at the lower end of the Suriname River.

The previous major flood was in 2006, which affected more than 170 villages. Displaced residents moved to areas of higher elevation, or to French Guiana and Brazil. President Ronald Venetiaan had to request help from foreign countries. A flood of such magnitude had not occurred for a century prior.

== Details ==
=== Flooding onset ===
On 9 March 2022, the Tapanahoni, Lawa and Marowijne rivers began to overflow their banks. Goejaba and Pikin Slee were among the first villages that were affected. At the offices of the Ministry of Transport, Communications and Tourism (TCT) in Pokigron, located at the mouth of the Upper Suriname in the Brokopondo reservoir, water started to flow in. The Ministry of Regional Development and Sport (ROS) decided that day to evacuate all teachers from Sipaliwini District back to Paramaribo.

On March 10, more villages were affected. Outposts of Medische Zending became more difficult to access: the clinics in Pokigron, Drietabbetje, Djoewee, Poesoegroenoe and Gonini had already been flooded. The police force of Gonini was moved to Stoelmanseiland with the help of the military. Landing strips and schools were also flooded.

By 13 March, medical posts had been lost in many places in the country. The floods had caused major economic damage. All schools in the affected areas were closed.

By 15 March 2022, after nearly a week of flooding, the affected area extended from Para District and Moengo in the north to the catchment basins of the Upper Saramacca, Upper Suriname, Tapanahoni, Lawa and Marowijne in the south.

=== Subsiding water levels ===
After 15 March, there were several dry days in a row, lowering the water level of the Upper Suriname. On the other hand, the excess water flowing downstream caused flooding in the coastal areas, partly worsened by high tides. The districts most affected were Nickerie and Saramacca in the north-west.

=== Public health ===
Health facilities were mostly closed in the affected areas, and an increase in diarrhea cases was initially reported. President Chan Santokhi had medicines delivered within a few days to combat this. Two weeks after the floods began, Medische Zending reported no additional diarrhea cases, as opposed to 2006. According to the vice-director of medical affairs, Maureen Wijngaarde-van Dijk, residents are now better informed of the dangers of flooded latrines and temporary toilets, and know to boil water before drinking.

== Response ==
On 15 March, the Surinamese government released a first tranche of 6 million Surinamese dollars (equivalent to 265,000 euro) for emergency aid to the population. This would cover one week of assistance. Vice President Ronnie Brunswijk observed the situation in flooded areas on 13 March from a helicopter, and showed his video recordings in the National Assembly. President Chan Santokhi visited Poesoegroenoe on 20 March; he wanted to visit more villages, but had to turn back due to bad weather conditions.

The Ministry of ROS has since the early days identified the need for aid packages in the affected areas. The National Coordination Centre for Disaster Control (NCCR) and the Surinamese Red Cross (SRK) monitored the situation on a daily basis. The NCCR distributed food, water and tarpaulins to the affected inhabitants. 1100 emergency aid packages were provided in the country through 18 March.

According to President Santokhi, flooding will be a recurring problem. He wants plans to set up higher-lying areas in a way that could provide emergency relief in the event of flooding. The Falawatra plan, introduced during the 2006 floods, was also brought back for consideration in 2022.

The Caribbean Disaster Emergency Management Agency (CDEMA) dispatched a two-member team on 31 May to assess flooding damage. Its partner donors had pledged to assist Suriname a week prior after a declaration from President Santokhi.

== Gallery ==
The following film stills are from footage taken by the Vice President's crew on 13 March 2022.

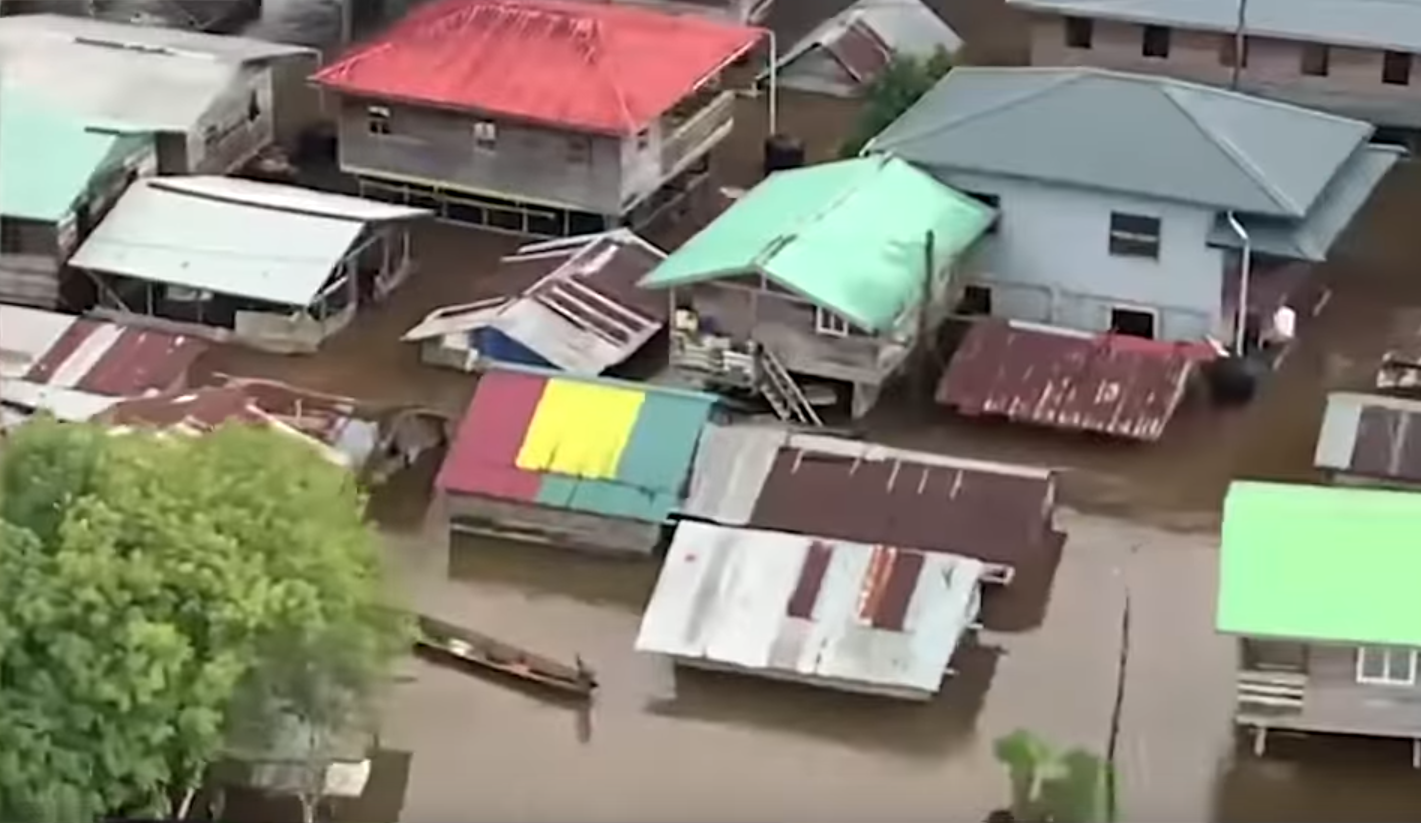

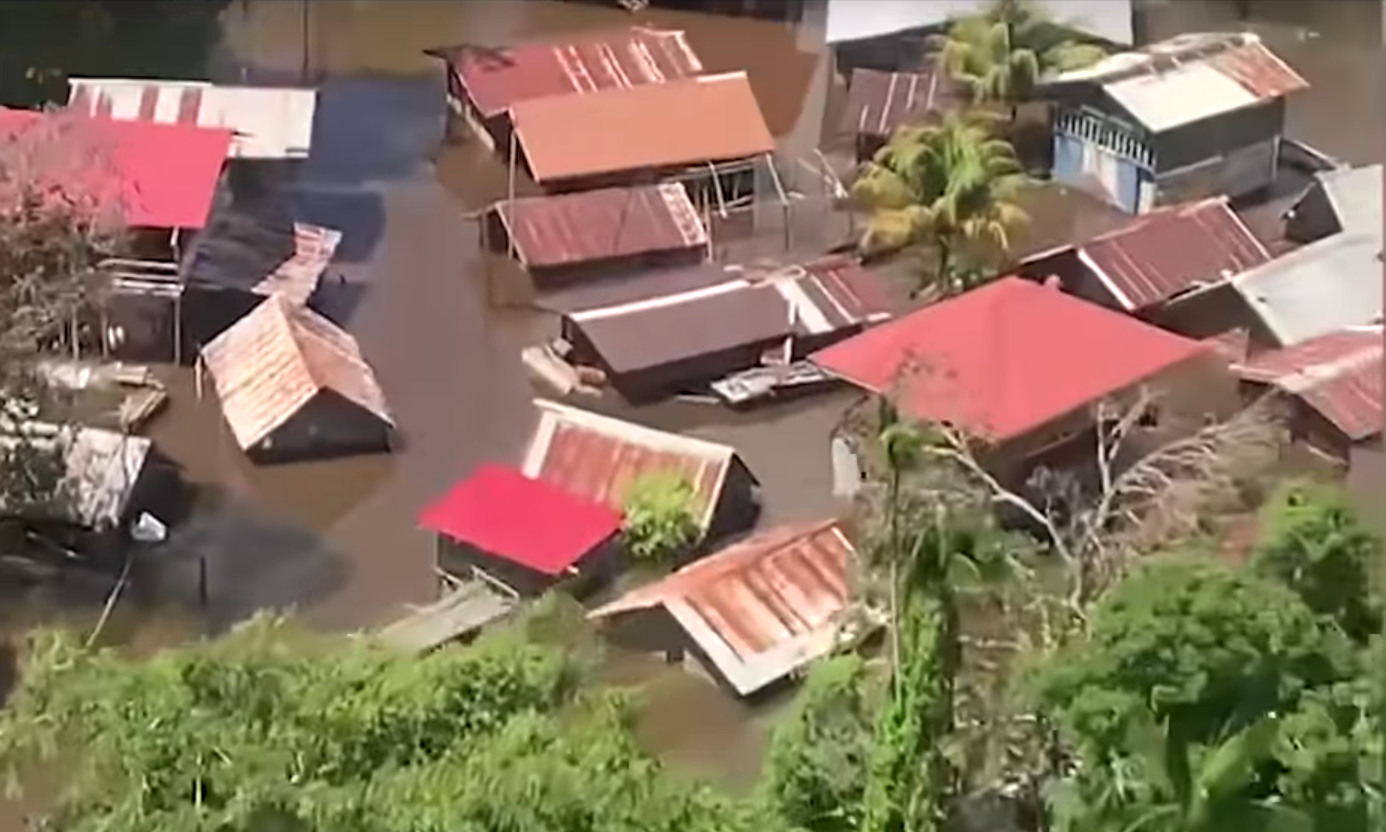

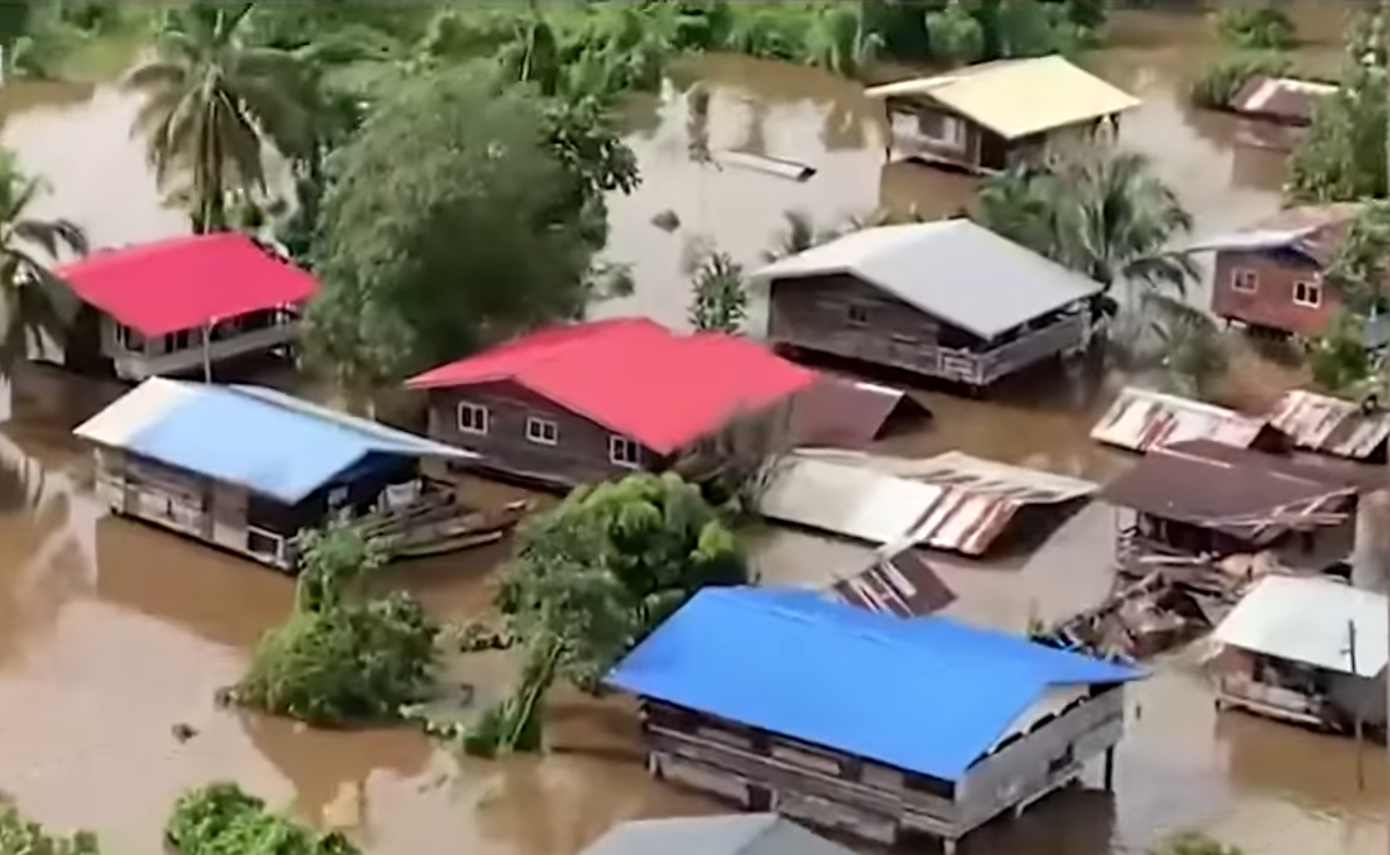

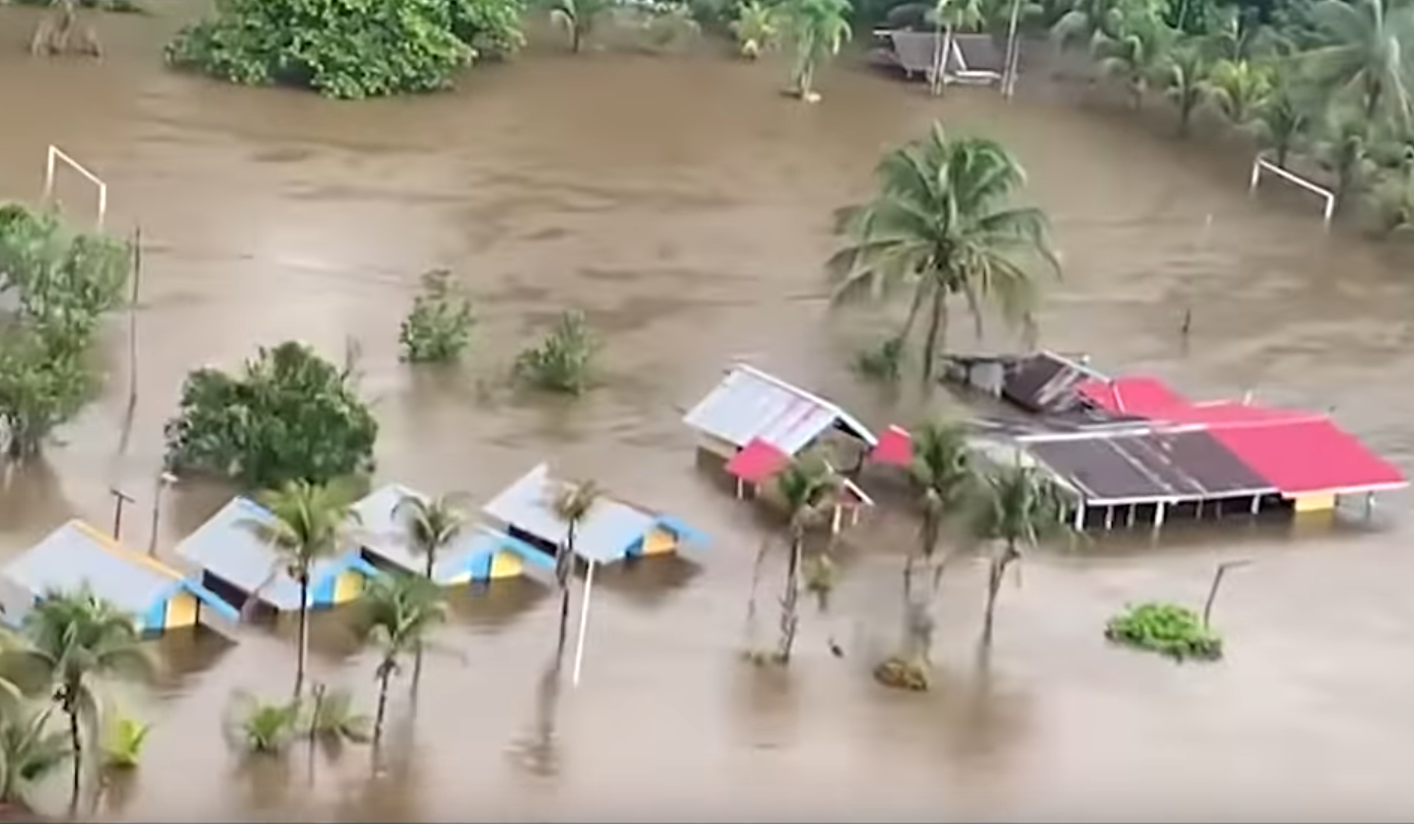

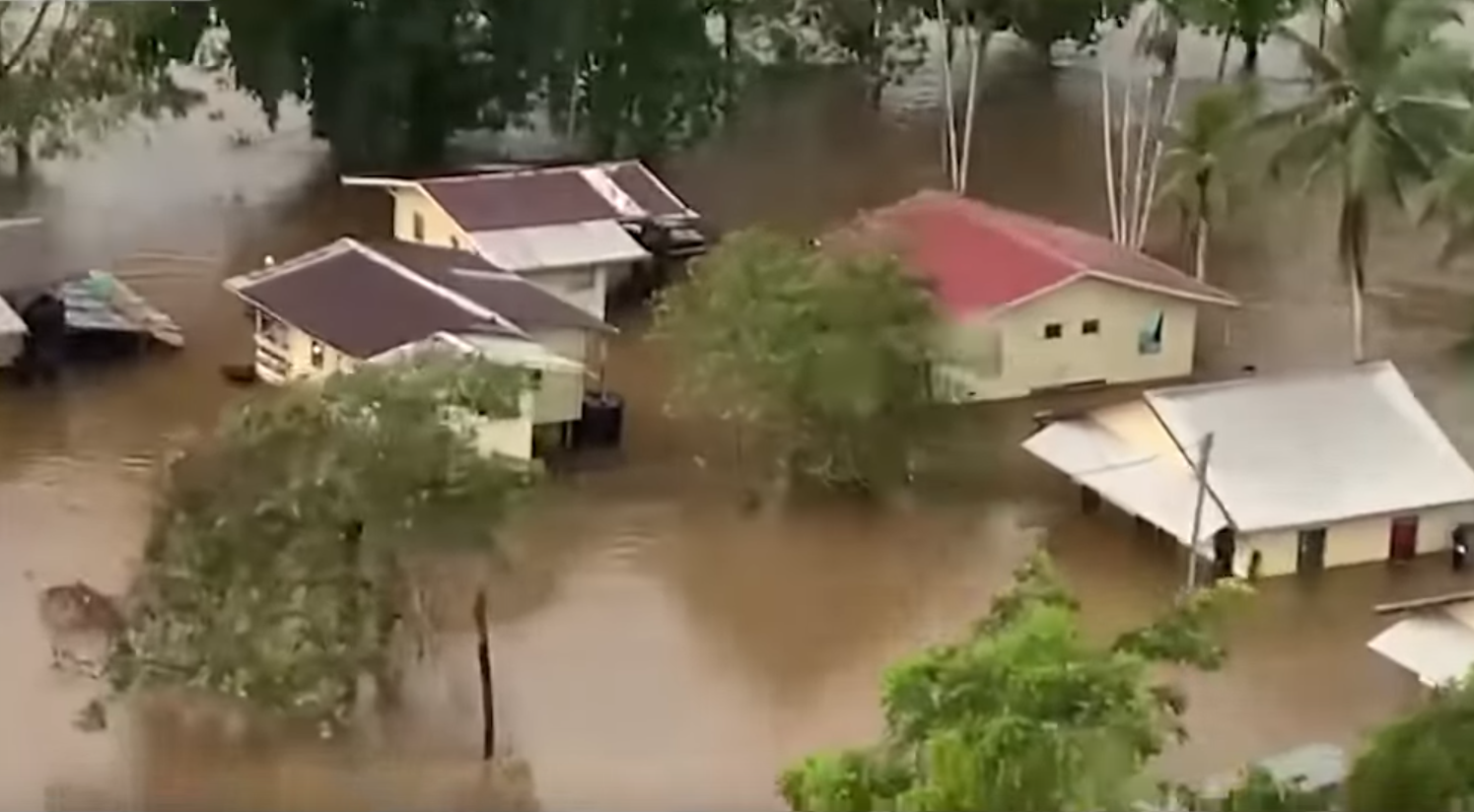

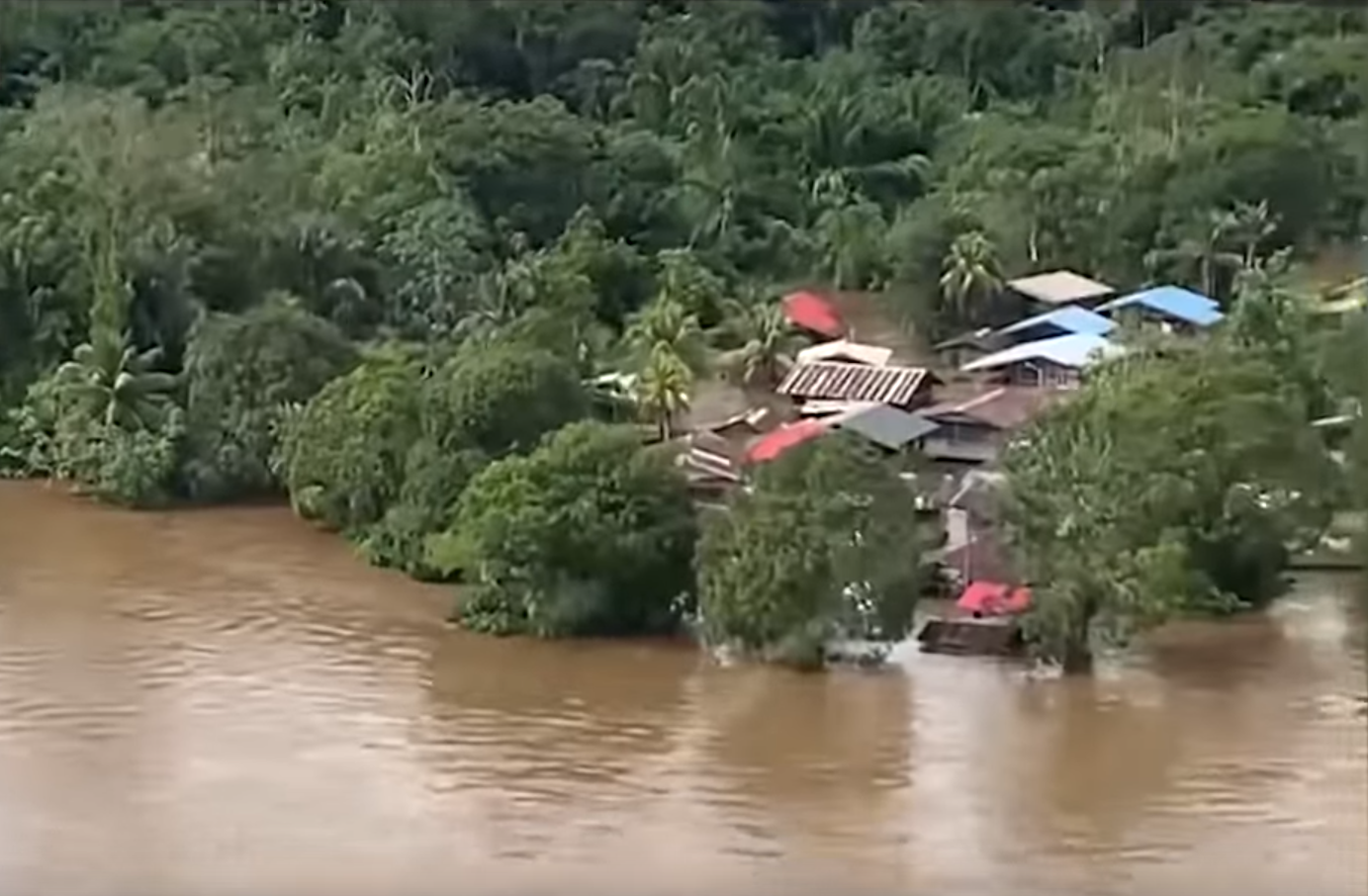

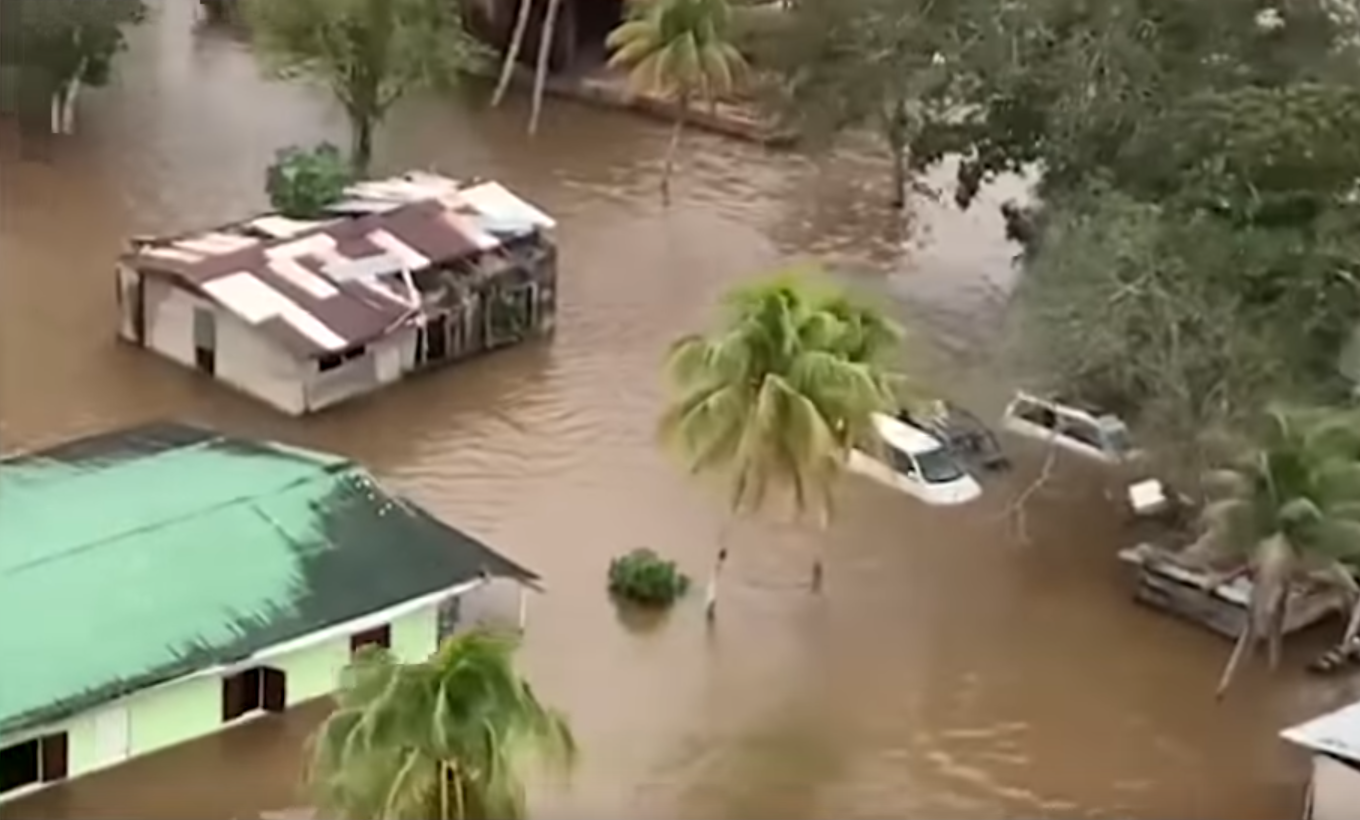

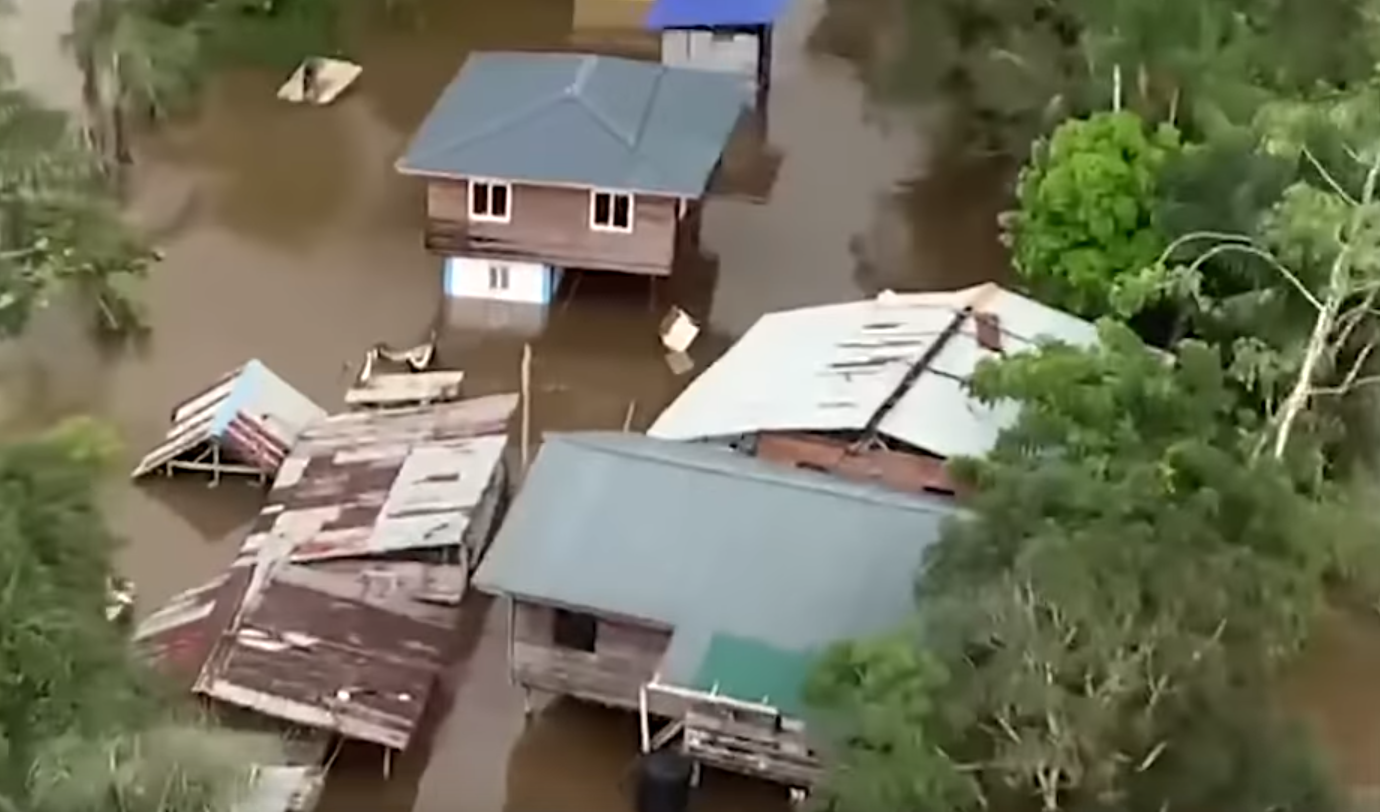

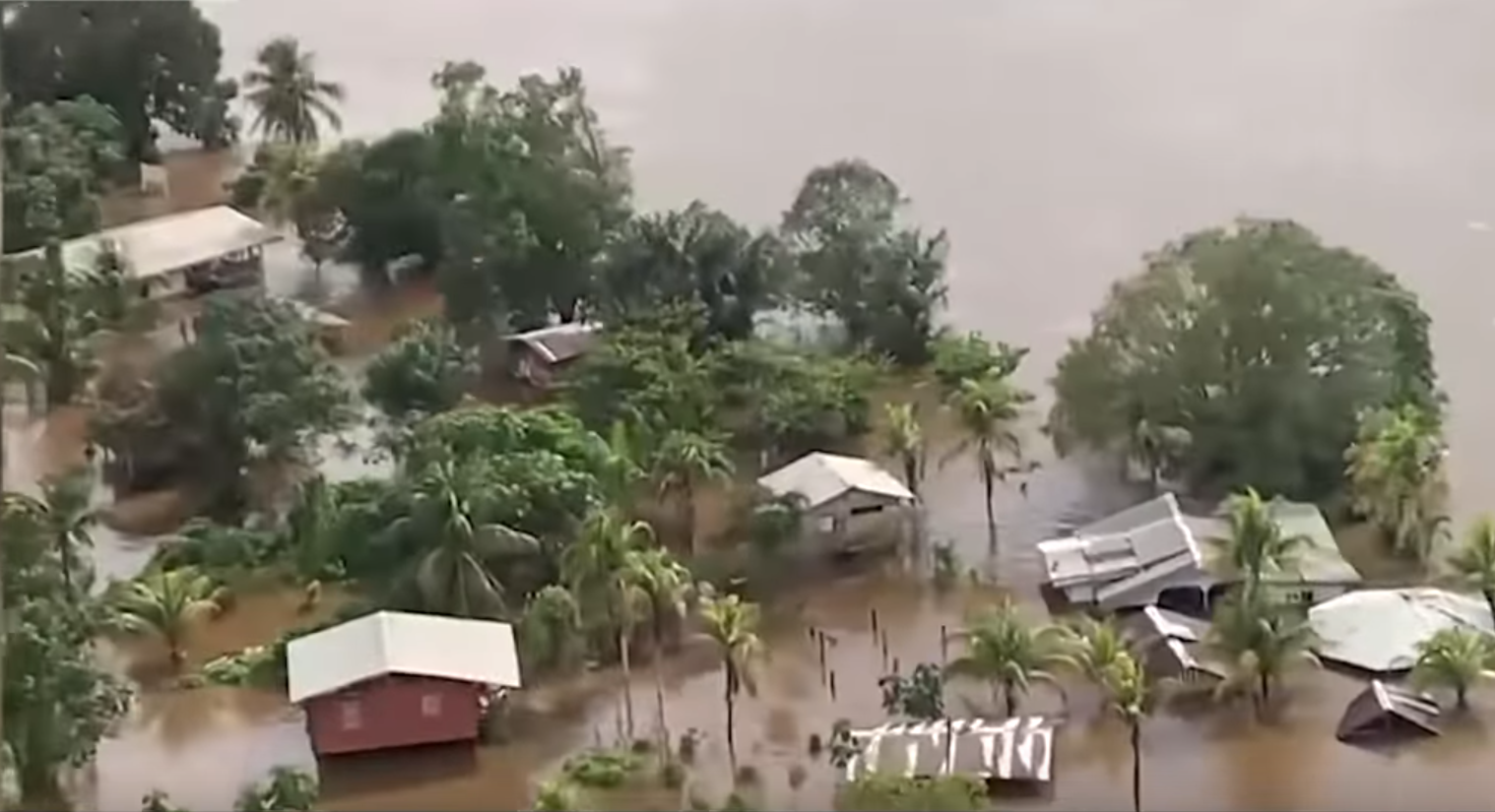

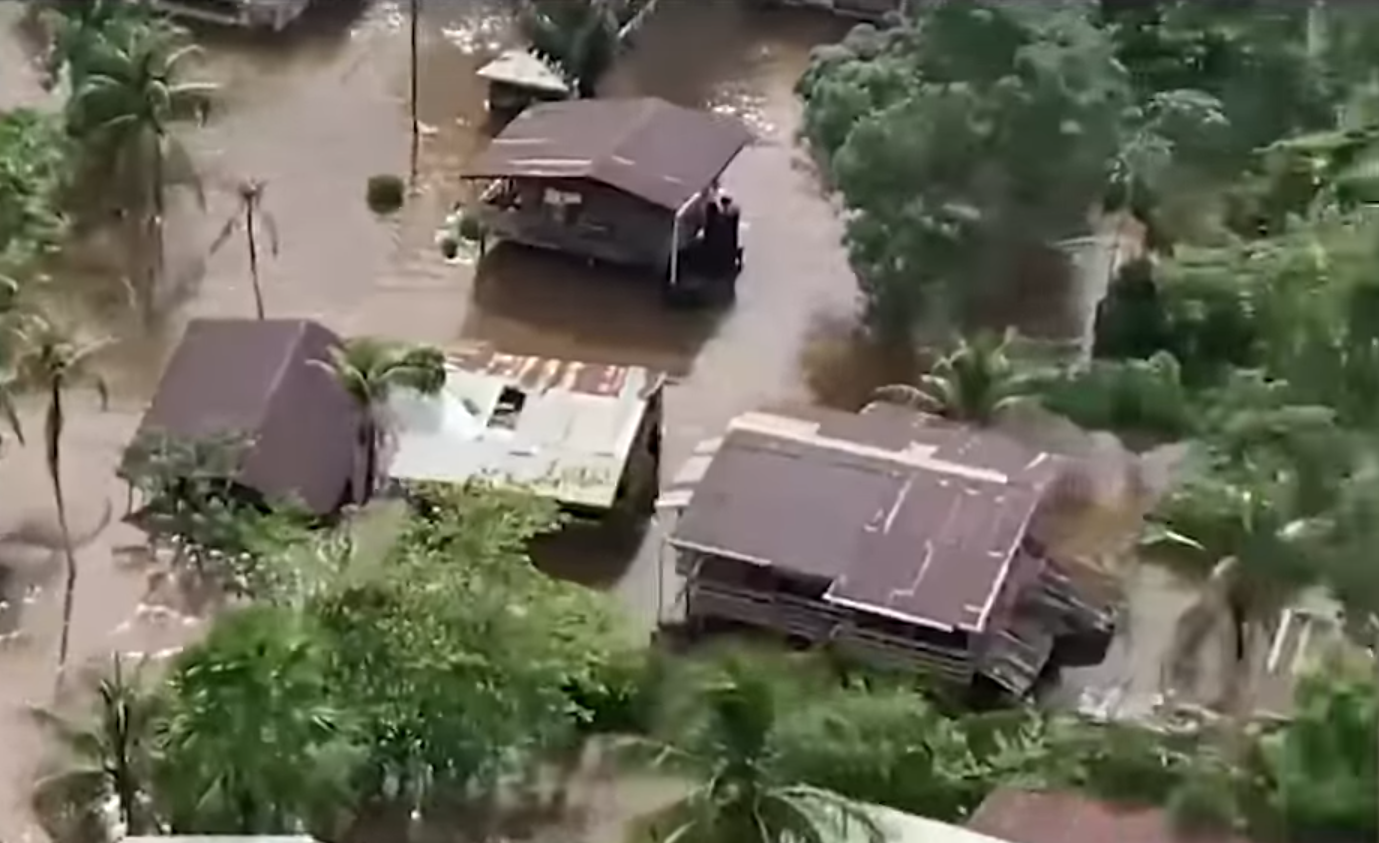

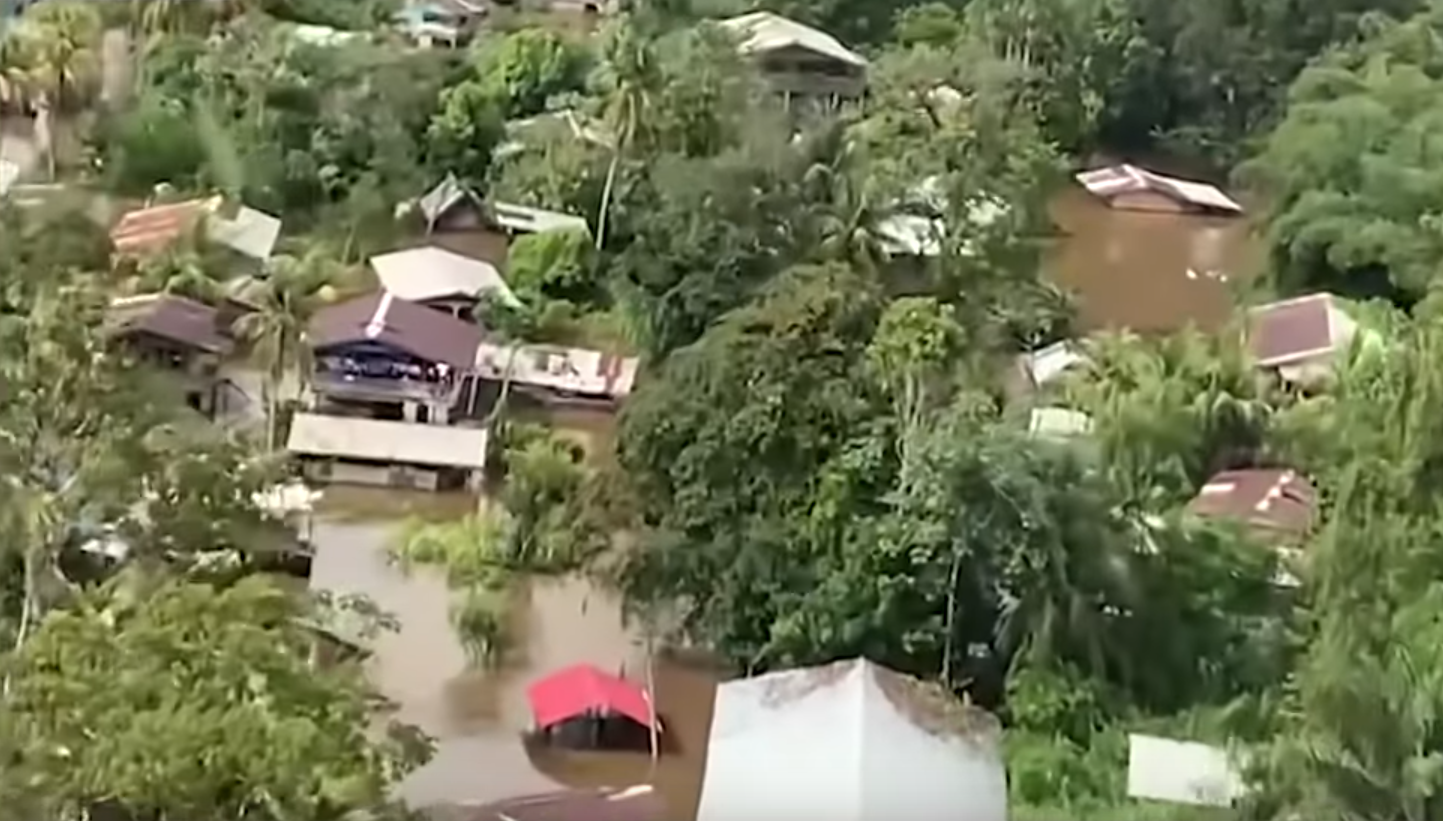

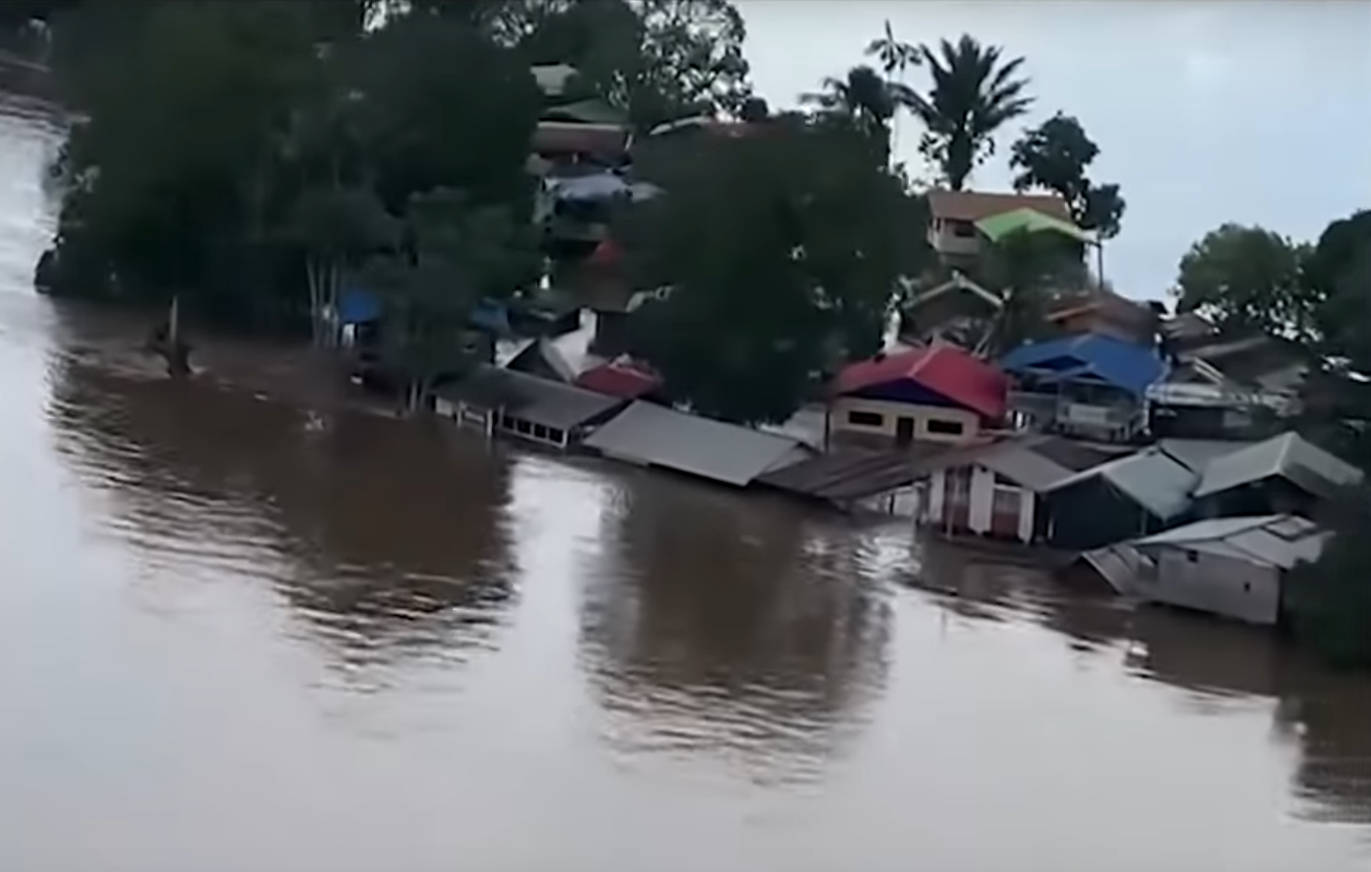

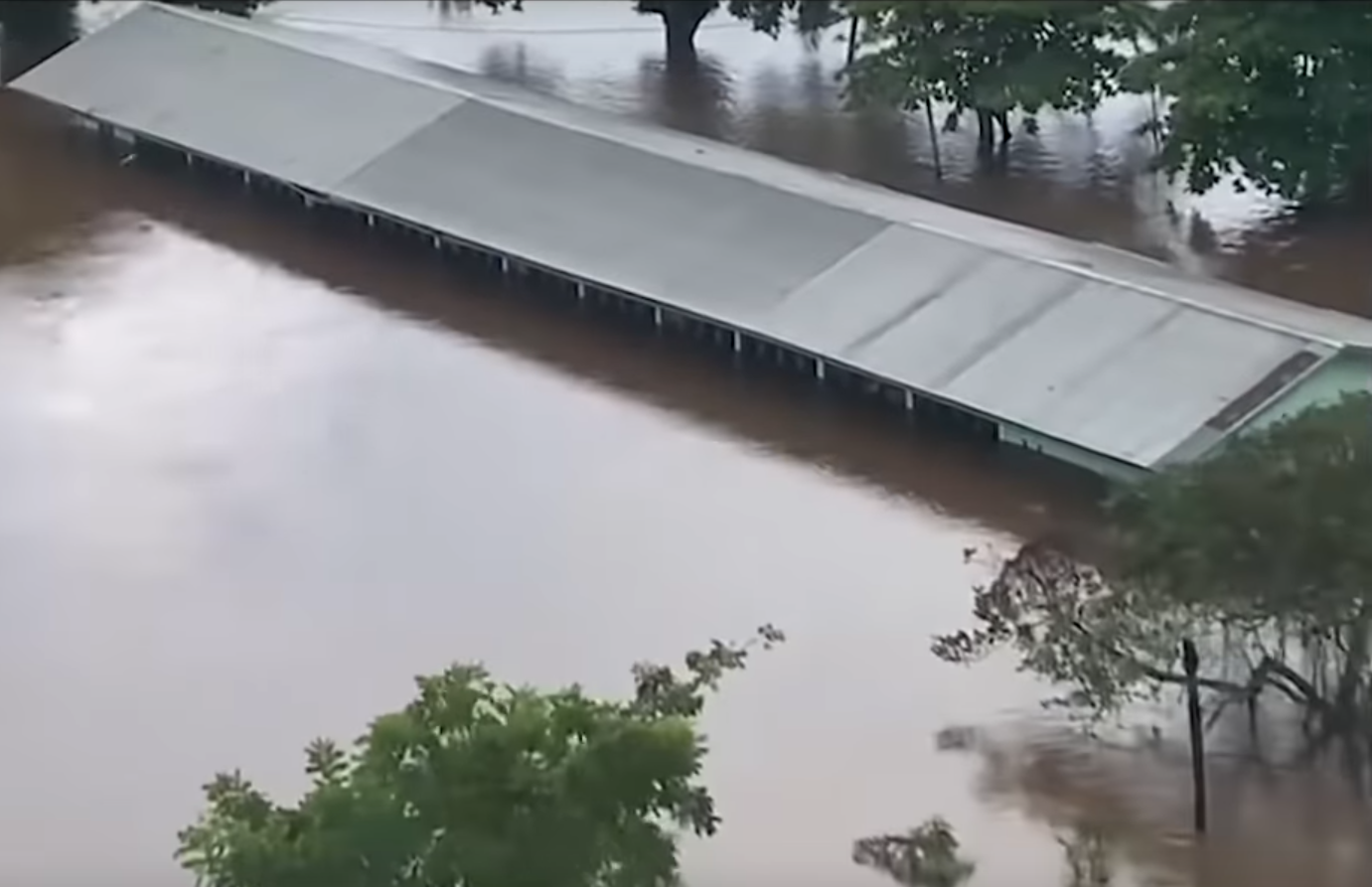

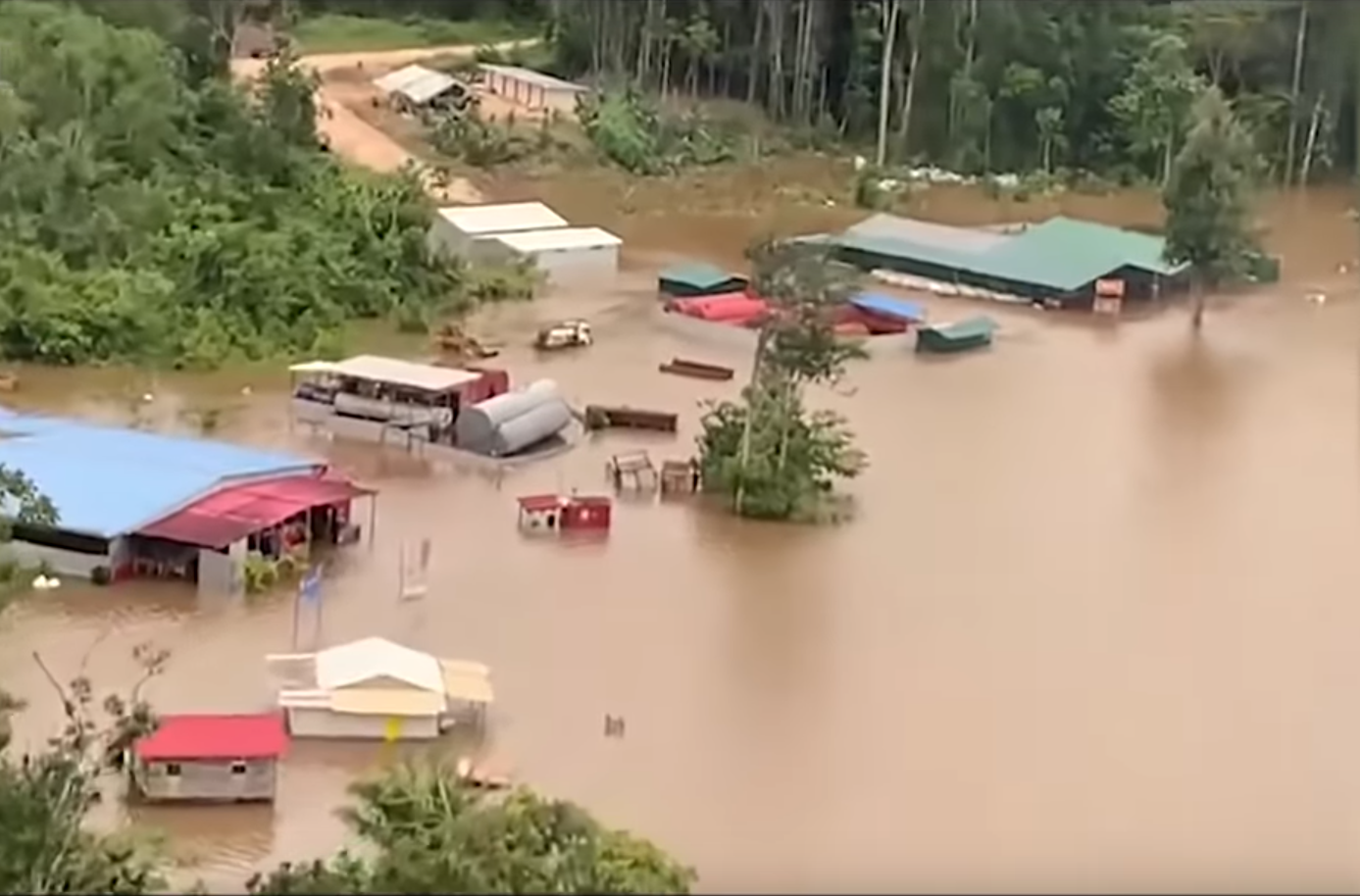

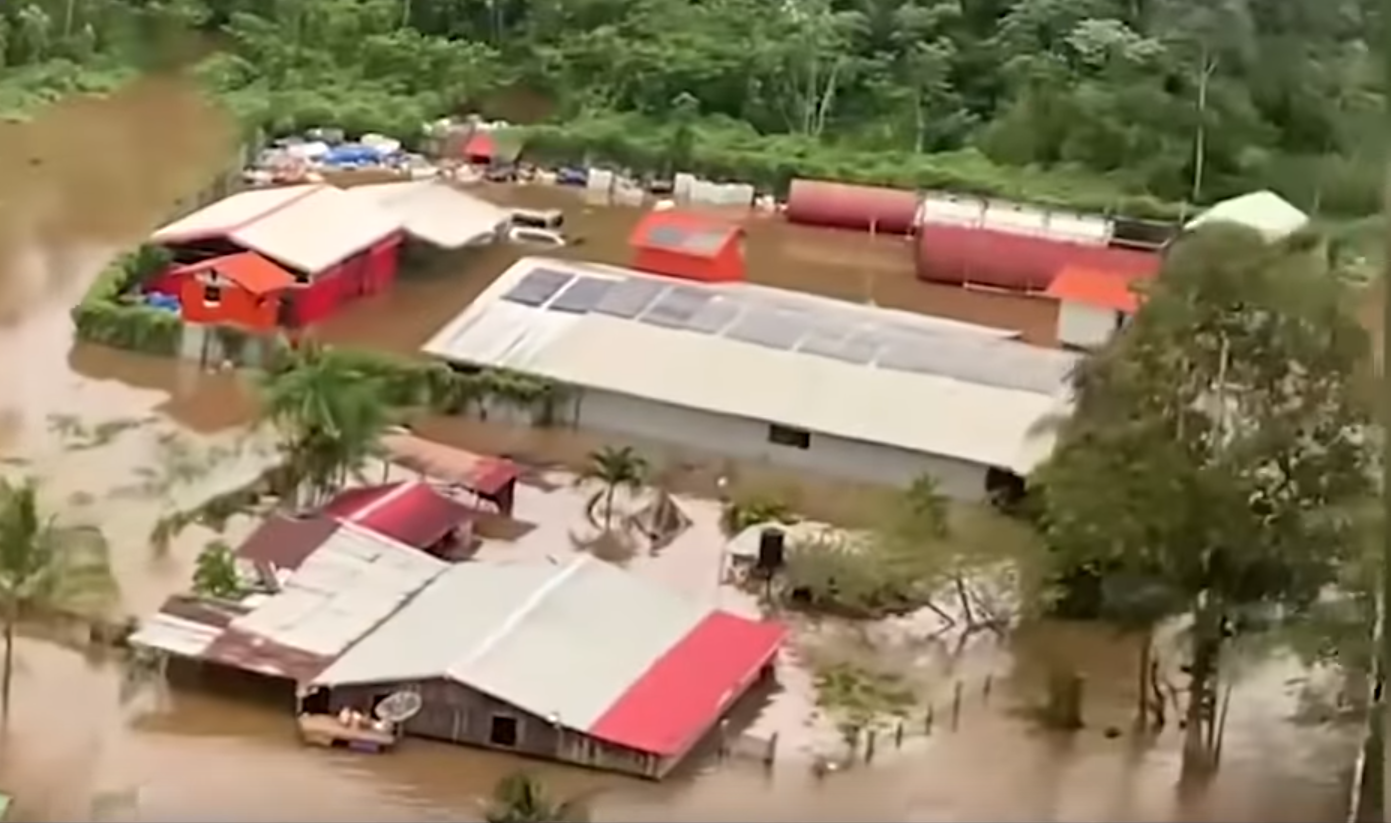

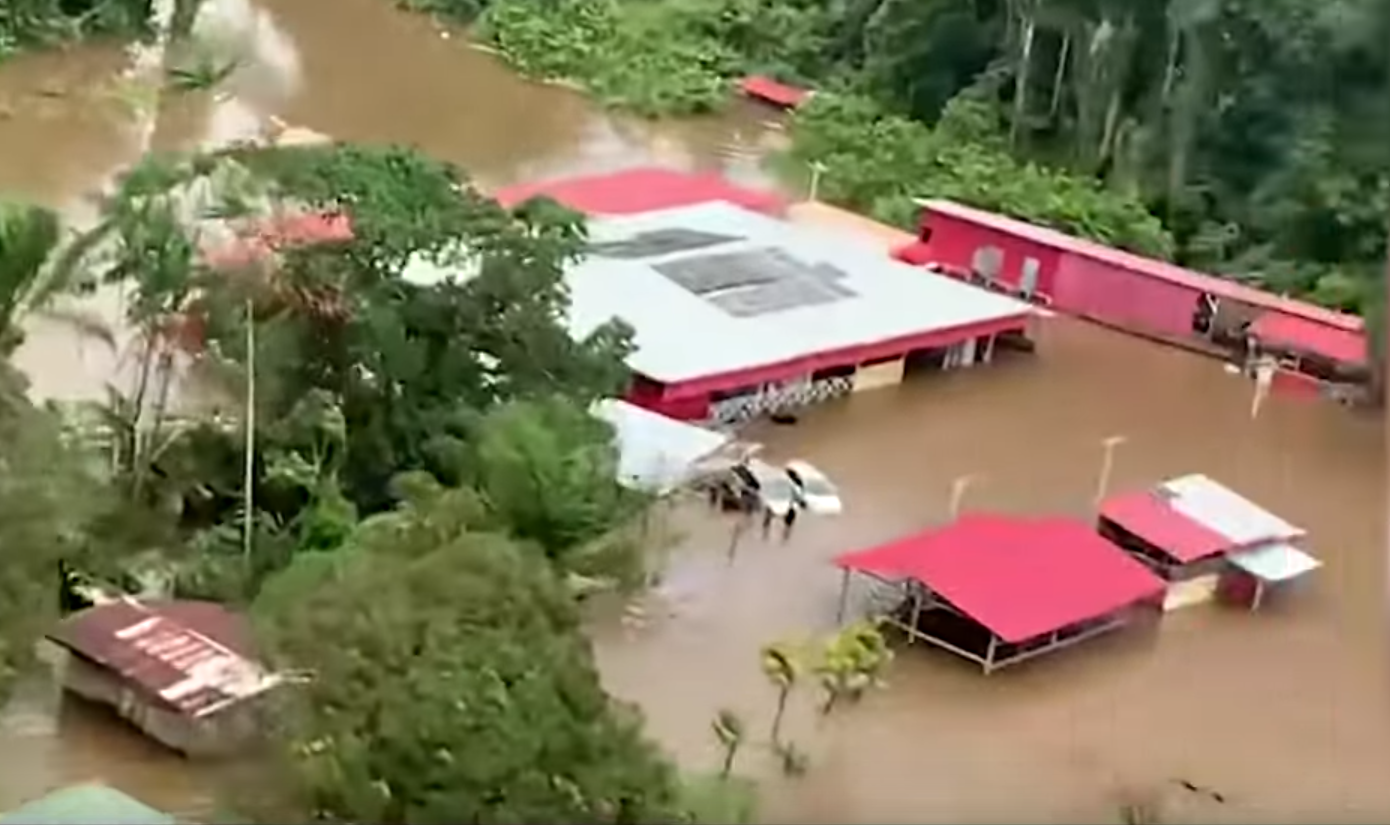

== See also ==
- Weather of 2022
