= Loue (disambiguation) =

The Loue is a river in France. Loue may also refer to:

== People ==
- Bayéré Junior Loué (born 2001), Ivorian footballer
- Edgar Loué (born 1983), Ivorian footballer

== Other uses ==
- Loué, commune in France.
- Loue (Isle), river in France
- Loue (tent), Finnish open tent-like shelter
