= Poncho tent =

Improvised emergency shelter

A poncho tent is a type of improvised emergency shelter, constructed using a rain poncho. Using materials on hand that were intended for use as rain gear, it becomes possible to re-purpose them as a shelter.

Poncho Tent Shelter

== Notability ==
A poncho tent is an extremely popular form of emergency survival shelter. Numerous examples can be seen published in books and on websites including official military manuals. These are distinct from other forms of temporary emergency shelter in part because of the improvised use of dual purpose materials. Improvising and adapting with limited resources is a common theme in survival situations.

The reason this is such a popular form of shelter may include the following:

- Rain ponchos are small and easy to carry.
- The shelter is fast and easy to construct.
- Rain ponchos are designed to block rain and thus make an excellent water proofing layer
- The materials are likely to be already on hand for a different purpose.

== Use cases ==
There are two important things to note about this type of shelter. First of all, it is a temporary shelter. Second, it is an emergency shelter. This means that it is not meant to be used long term and is only meant to be used in an emergency when no other options are available.

=== Temporary ===
A temporary shelter is one that is only meant to be used for a short time. These are typically portable. They can also usually be set up quickly. An example of a temporary shelter would be a tent. Other examples would include a debris hut, lean-to, or snow cave.

This differs from a permanent shelter which is meant to be more long term and is usually not movable. An example of a long term shelter would be a log cabin. Another example would be a wigwam.

=== Emergency ===
An emergency shelter is one that would be used in an emergency situation. That generally means that the situation wasn't specifically planned for. It may have been prepared for "just in case". For example, if a person was planning on sleeping outside in the wilderness, they should bring either a fold-able tent or a tarp as these will be more effective. If someone was not specifically planning on sleeping outside, they may carry an emergency blanket or poncho "just in case" knowing that they could be used as a shelter if they were stuck in an emergency situation.

== Effectiveness ==
The poncho tent is considered an effective shelter in emergency situations. There are ways in which this might be measured.

=== Keeping dry ===
One of the primary purposes of a shelter is to keep dry. A poncho tent serves this purpose well. Rain ponchos are designed to keep people dry. They work well as a water proofing layer. The main limitation here is the size of the poncho. The other potential limiting factor might be how the shelter is constructed. For example, if multiple ponchos are used, gaps between them may allow leakage if not properly connected.

=== Warmth ===
Another main purpose of a shelter is to keep warm. A poncho tent may provide some warmth depending on how it is constructed and what type of poncho is used. If a thick poncho is used and the shelter is built in such a way that heat can be trapped inside, then it may provide some significant value in terms of warmth. In the most ideal cases, it may be very effective. If a thin poncho is used or if gaps are present, it will not provide much value in terms of staying warm.

=== Shielding from the sun ===
A poncho tent can also be used as a method of shielding oneself from the sun. This is especially useful in a hot desert environment or when trapped on a life raft out on the open sea. Heat or exposure to intense sunlight may result in dehydration and severe sunburns.

=== Ground protection ===
Protection from the ground is an important aspect of emergency survival shelters. This is something that is not provided by a simple poncho shelter. A large percentage of body heat is lost to the ground. Sleeping directly on the ground without a layer of bedding can cause loss of heat. If the ground is wet, this can also pose a problem.

== Issues and hazards ==
Several different issues can arise.

=== Fire ===
Fire can be a problem. A thin poncho can easily be damaged by a spark or ember from a fire. This limits most poncho tents to being built further away from a fire. This means that it is hard to heat this type of shelter with a fire. This is less of an issue if using a large, thick poncho that is less likely to catch on fire. This is an issue that is not present in certain other types of simple shelters. For example, a lean-to made from logs and branches would oftentimes be built adjacent to a campfire.

=== Tearing ===
Tearing can be a problem. This is more a problem with thinner, cheaper ponchos than with thicker ponchos. Rain ponchos can tear easily. This is often seen when attempting to tie them down.

=== Wind ===
Wind can quickly tear apart a poncho shelter. This is especially true if not reinforced. Heavier ponchos will be able to withstand more wind. One commonly used method to mitigate this problem is to reinforce it with any combination of duct tape, logs, and branches.

== See also ==
- Tarp tent
- Lean-to
