= Tarp tent =

Piece of tarp used as a tent

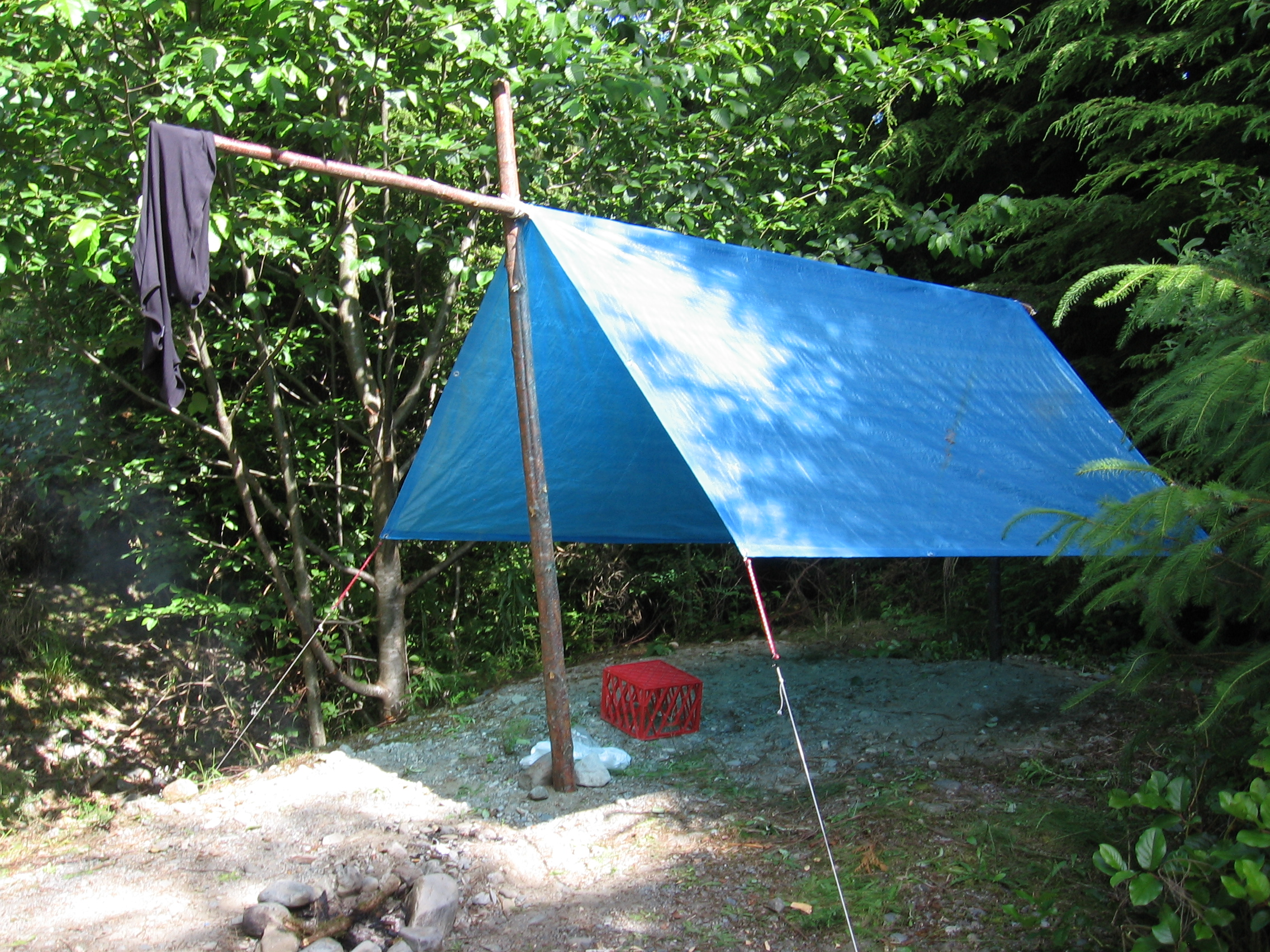
An improvised tent using polytarp as a fly, folded into two rectangles along its centerline

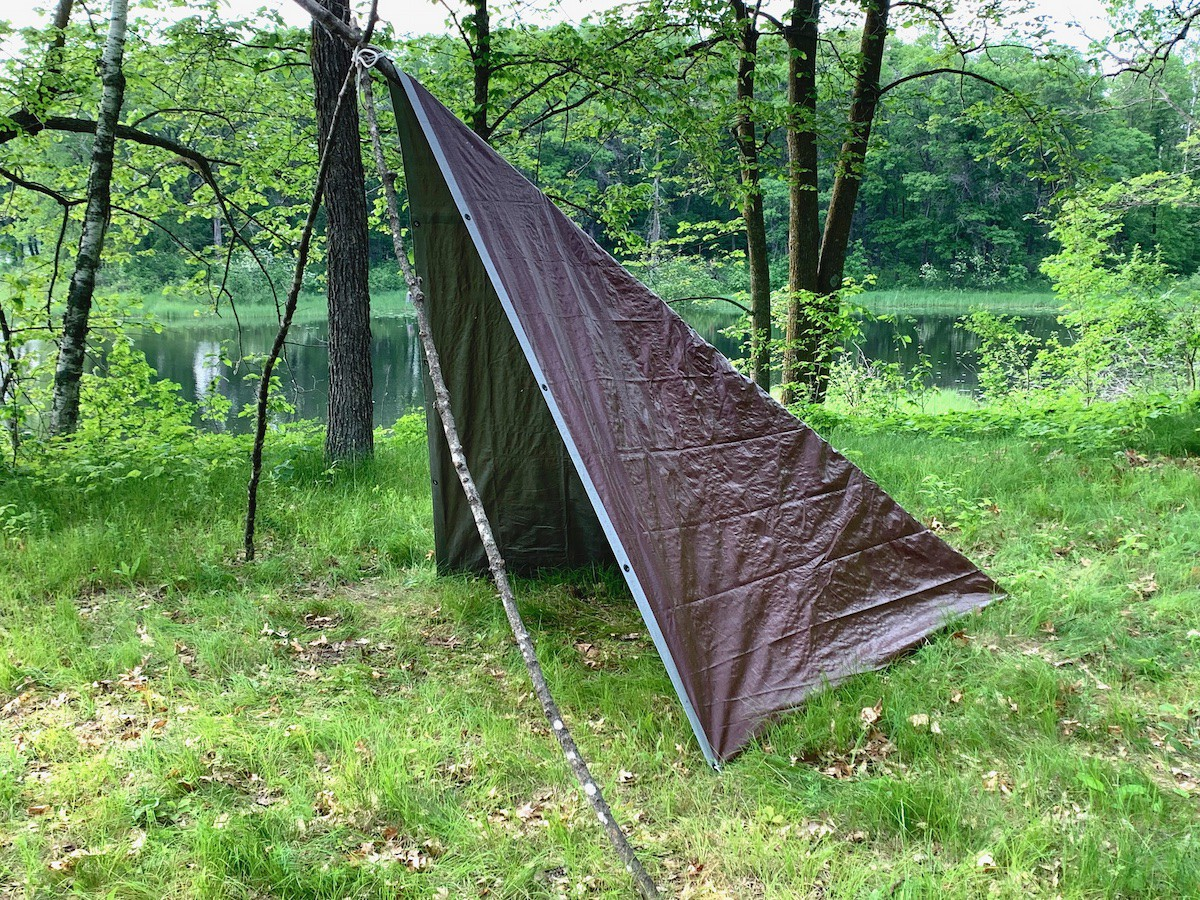
An improvised Forester tent using an 8-foot square tarp, folded into two triangles along its diagonal

A loue is a Finnish open tent-like shelter.

A tarp tent is a single walled hybrid of a tent and a tarpaulin, generally used in combination with a mosquito net that may be manufactured specifically for a particular configuration. It may also refer to more enclosed tarp configurations that provide similar levels of protection from the elements but does not refer to open lean-to or raised type tarp setups.

A tarp is lighter and cheaper than an equivalent tent. However, because it is more open, on its own it provides no protection from insects. As such a tarp-tent is a compromise position between the two.

More sophisticated tarp tents are now manufactured or homemade with such things as bug screening and storm flaps on the ends and even floors and vents. According to Harvey Manning in his book Backpacking One Step at a Time (The REI Press Seattle), "The term 'tarp-tent' as used here denotes a broad category which at one boundary is nothing more than a shaped tarp and at the other end verges on a 'true' tent. The common characteristic is a single wall, in most cases, waterproof."

== See also ==
- Poncho tent
- Bivouac
- Basha
- Hammock Camping
