= Dwelling =

Unit of accommodation

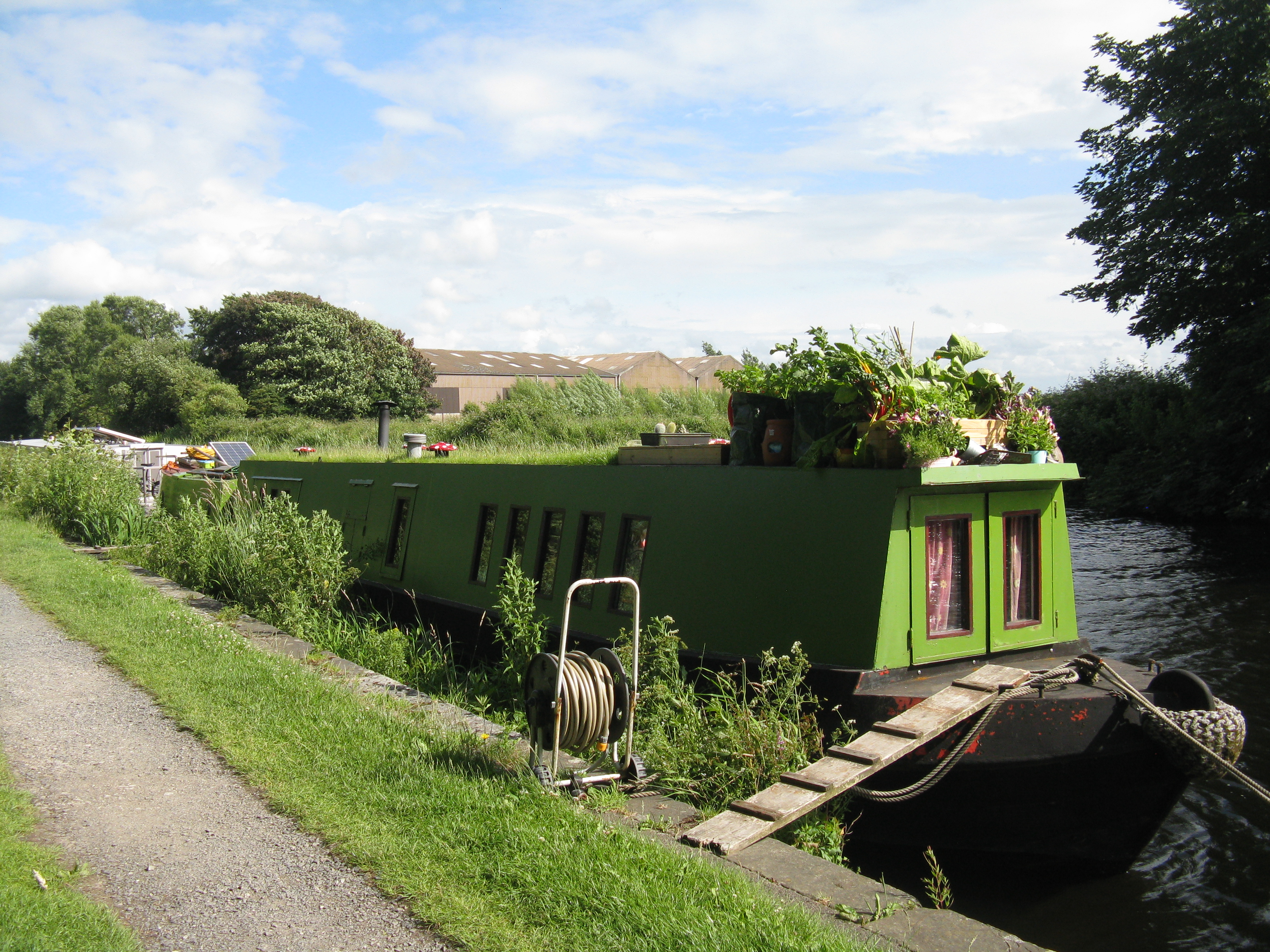
Houseboat, England

In law, a dwelling (also known as a residence, abode or domicile) is a self-contained unit of accommodation – such as a house, apartment, mobile home, houseboat, recreational vehicle, or other "substantial" structure – used as a home by one or more households. The concept of a dwelling has significance in relation to search and seizure, conveyancing of real property, burglary, trespass, and land-use planning.

== Legal definitions ==
Legal definitions vary by jurisdiction.

=== 'Dwelling' (England and Wales) ===
Under English law, a dwelling is defined as a self-contained 'substantial' unit of accommodation, such as a building, part of a building, caravan, houseboat or other mobile home. A tent is not normally considered substantial.

=== 'Dwelling' (North Carolina) ===
Under North Carolina General Statute § 160D-102(15), a dwelling is a building, structure, manufactured home, mobile home, or part thereof that is used or intended for human habitation. The definition also includes associated outbuildings and appurtenances, with specified exceptions for seasonal vacation use.

According to N.C. Gen. Stat. § 53-244.030, "Dwelling" means a residential structure that contains one to four units, whether or not that structure is attached to real property. The term includes an individual condominium unit, cooperative unit, manufactured home, mobile home, or trailer if it is used as a residence. Under the Oregon law, a "dwelling" is defined as a "building which regularly or intermittently is occupied by a person lodging therein at night, whether or not a person is actually present." The United States v. Adams, 2009 U.S. App. LEXIS 25866 (9th Cir. Or. 25 November 2009)

=== 'Habitual residence' (international law) ===
In international conventions, a person can have only one habitual residence, being the place where the individual ordinarily resides and routinely returns to after visiting other places for a reasonably significant period of time. It is used to determine the law which should be applied to determine a given legal dispute. The Hague Conference on Private International Law has deliberately refrained from offering a definition so that the concept may be flexible and adaptable to practical requirements.

=== 'Inhabited dwelling' (various US states) ===
In California, California Penal Code § 246 refers to the discharging of a firearm at an inhabited dwelling house. This statute specifies that a "dwelling" (more commonly referred to as a house) is "inhabited" if a person lives in it; it is irrelevant whether anyone is present. A house, building, or structure is not considered "inhabited" or "occupied" if the occupants have moved out or vacated and do not intend to return, even if the personal property was left behind. Therefore, it would no longer be considered a dwelling for legal purposes, which from a defense standpoint, would negate a conviction under this code. For prosecutors, it is advantageous to construe these terms loosely in order to secure as many convictions as possible for violation of this code. Examples of loose interpretation exist not only in California but also in other states such as Colorado where a similar statute (Colorado Code § 18-1-901(3)(g)) applies in cases even when a shooting at a detached garage that does not traditionally constitute a dwelling or house. However, per common law, courts in both of these states and others have held that it does qualify as an occupied building for purposes of a criminal conviction.

=== The 'curtilage' (boundary) of a dwelling ===
In law, the curtilage of a dwelling is the land immediately surrounding it, including any closely associated buildings and structures. It delineates the boundary within which a homeowner can have a reasonable expectation of privacy with particular relevance to search and seizure, conveyancing of real property, burglary, trespass, and land use planning. In urban properties, the location of the curtilage may be evident from the position of fences, walls, and similar; within larger properties, it may be a matter of some legal debate as to where the private area ends and any "open fields beyond" begin.

== See also ==
- Housing
- List of human habitation forms
- Residence in English family law, pertaining to where children should live in the case of disputes
- Van-dwelling
