= Polytarp sails =

Polytarp sails refer to sails constructed from rectangular polyethylene tarpaulins. Home boat builders often favor these synthetic sheet sails because the materials are inexpensive and easy to assemble into functional, durable sails.

== Construction method ==
The usual construction method involves

- laying out the tarp material,
- measuring the sail dimensions,
- creating baselines from corner to corner,
- placing double-faced carpet tape around the sail outline with sufficient rounding on selected edges to shape the sail,
- placing a reinforcing rope along the inner edge of the tape, and
- folding the taped overlap back over the rope to create the sail shape.

The sail can be strengthened by adding reinforcing material to the corners and stitching around the edges of the sail. Adding grommets to the corners and edges will allow the sail to be attached to the mast and spars. Because these grommets are placed through doubled material and behind the reinforcing line inside the sail edge, the resulting attachment points have tremendous strength.

== Grades and specifications ==
The most attractive, durable polytarp sails are usually made from a heavier white polytarp material. Generally, polysails are made from white ultraviolet-protected (UV-protected) material that is 12–16 mils (0.30–0.40 mm) thick (1 mil is .001 inches) and weighs about 6–8 ounces per square yard (200-270 grams per square meter) —about twice the weight and thickness of the common colored tarps which usually have no UV protection.

The weave density of polyethylene strips in the inner layer determines the quality of the material. Common tarps have a weave of about 6' x 8' (1.8 x 2.4 m). "Canopy grade" white polytarps, on the other hand, have a weave of 12' x 14' (3.6 m x 4.3 m) or 14' x 14' (4.3 m x 4.3 m). Increasingly, white polytarp is used to construct mainsails, jibs, and mizzens, while the lightweight polytarp materials are reserved for making spinnakers.

Polysail is the term given to any sail made of polytarp material and not just the white polytarp material.

== Common sail types ==
Polytarp is used to construct nearly every type of sail. The maximum weight of the fully-loaded vessel may affect the viability of a poly tarp sail. However, there is no current consensus on the limit. This will vary depending upon the weight of the tarp material.
