= 2006 Suriname floods =

Flood event

- Date: May 1, 2006
- Location: East Suriname
- Type: Flooding

The 2006 Suriname floods were a series of floods that occurred in May 2006 in Suriname. They primarily affected indigenous and Maroon settlements in the country's interior. It affected up to 25,000 people in the regions of Pokigron, Tapanahony, Lawa, and Marowijne, and more.

== Details ==
The first heavy rains were reported on May 1, 2006. It raised the level of the Upper Suriname River, leading to extensive flooding along its bank.

Up to 25,000 people were affected in some capacity by the floods. Flooding affected around 30,000 square km, including 157 villages. Suriname's National Coordination Center for Disaster Response headed the relief efforts. No fatalities were reported. Statistical analyzes showed no connection with the natural phenomenon El Niño in the Pacific Ocean.

Indigenous people living in villages in the Sipaliwini Savanna crossed the border into Brazil on May 10, 2006, in search of food. All residents of the Wayana village of Kawemhakan also moved to neighboring French Guiana because their village was flooded. The heavy rainfall has flooded large parts of eighteen Trio and Wayana villages in South Suriname. All agricultural land and villages on the Sipaliwini, Lucie and Courantyne rivers were partly flooded.

On May 10, 2006, President Ronald Venetiaan asked foreign countries for help. He declared the affected regions disaster areas on May 9. The Netherlands pledged 1 million euros for emergency aid; Belgium 100,000 euros. The Netherlands also sent a team of experts at the request of the Surinamese government. The municipalities of Amsterdam and Rotterdam both donated 250,000 euros for aid in the affected area. In the meantime, the Surinamese population in Amsterdam started a fundraising campaign themselves. As a contribution to the collection for the Floods in Suriname in May 2006, Ronald Snijders wrote the song Flood in Suriname, which was released on CD and sung by Denise Jannah, Gerda Havertong, Jörgen Raymann, Oscar Harris and Max Nijman.
