= Tarpaulin =

Large sheet of strong, flexible, water-resistant or waterproof material

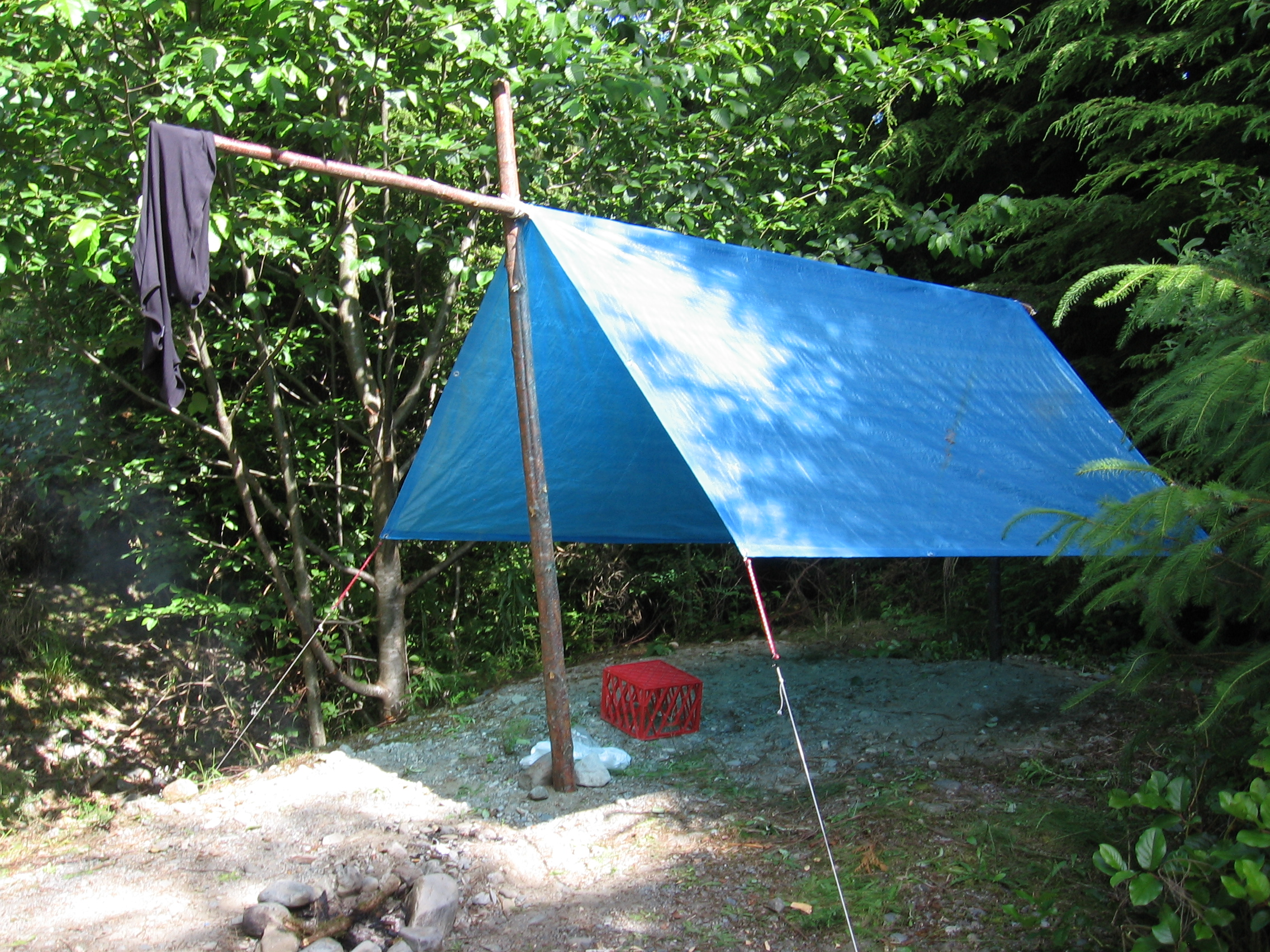
An improvised tent using polytarp as a fly

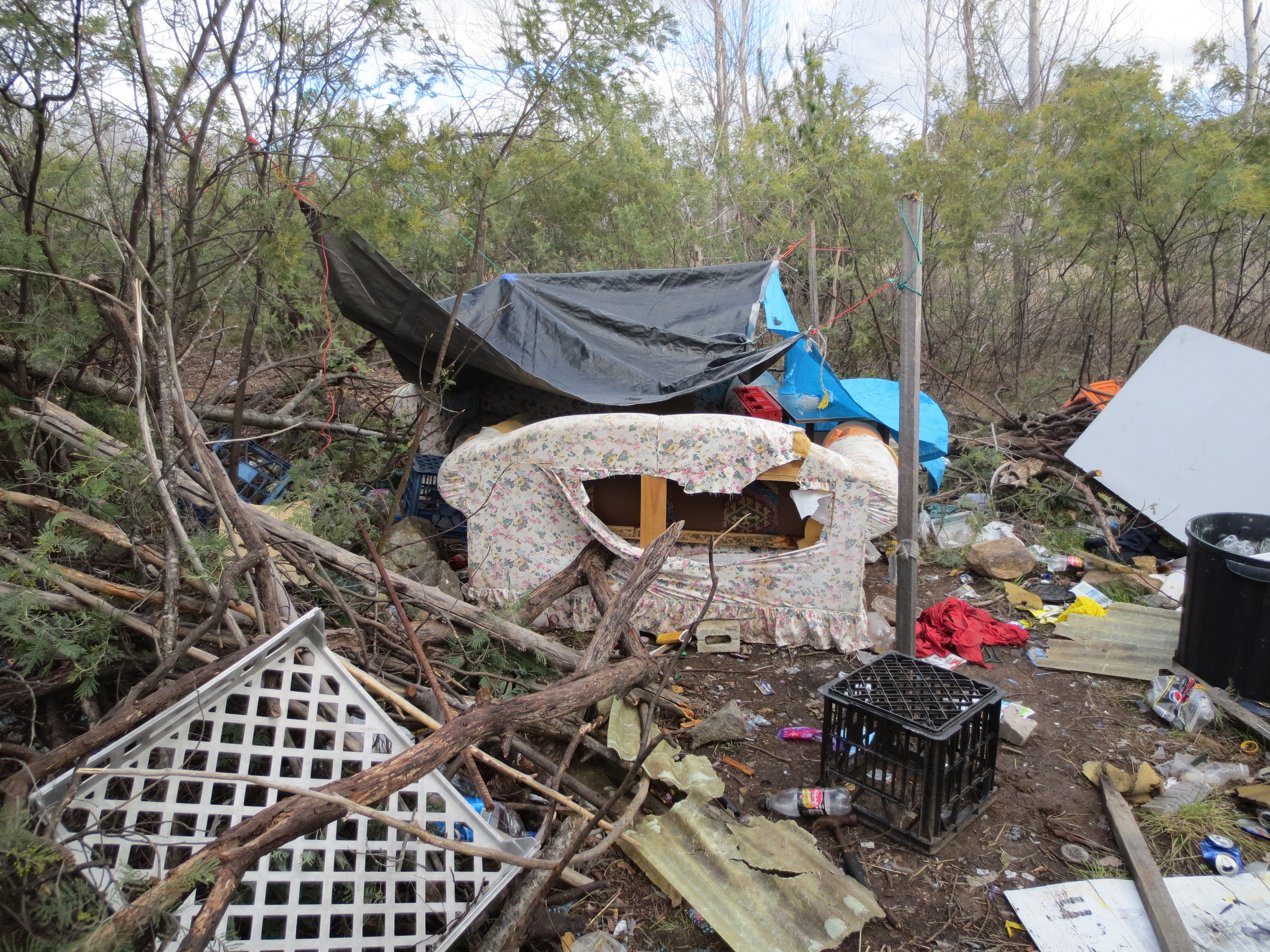
Abandoned homeless shelter using plastic tarp

A tarpaulin (/tɑːrˈpɔːlɪn/ tar-PAW-lin, also US: /ˈtɑːrpəlɪn/) or tarp is a large sheet of strong, flexible, water-resistant or waterproof material, often cloth such as canvas or polyester coated with polyurethane, or made of plastics such as polyethylene. Tarpaulins often have reinforced grommets at the corners and along the sides to form attachment points for rope, allowing them to be tied down or suspended.

Inexpensive modern tarpaulins are made from woven polyethylene; this material has become so commonly used for tarpaulins that people in some places refer to it colloquially as "poly tarp" or "polytarp".

== Etymology ==
The word tarpaulin originated as a compound of the words tar and palling, referring to a tarred canvas pall used to cover objects on ships. Sailors often tarred their own overclothes in the same manner as the sheets or palls. By association, sailors became known as "jack tars".

In the mid-19th century, paulin was used for such a cloth.

== Uses ==
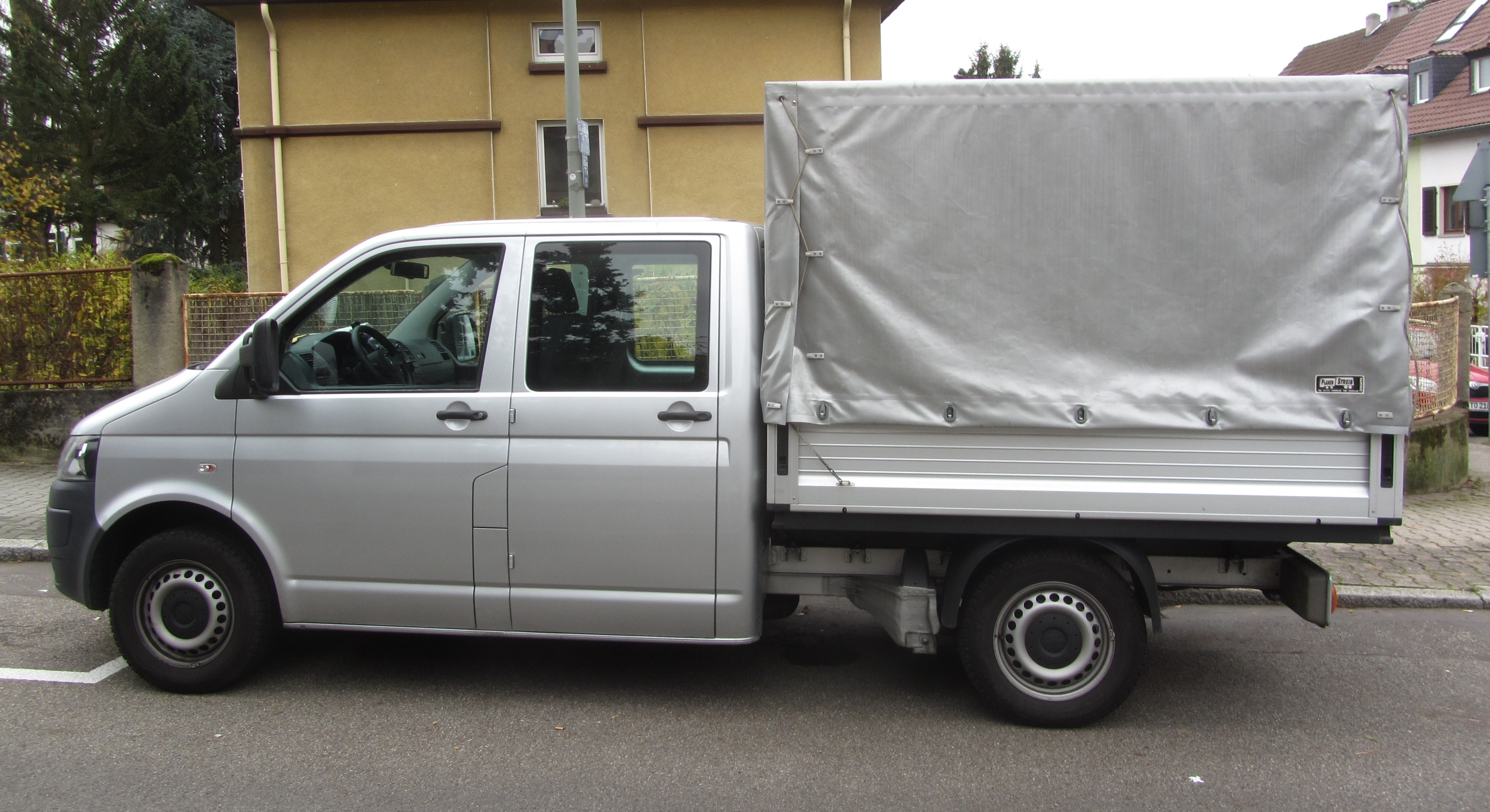
Truck with tarpaulin to cover cargo

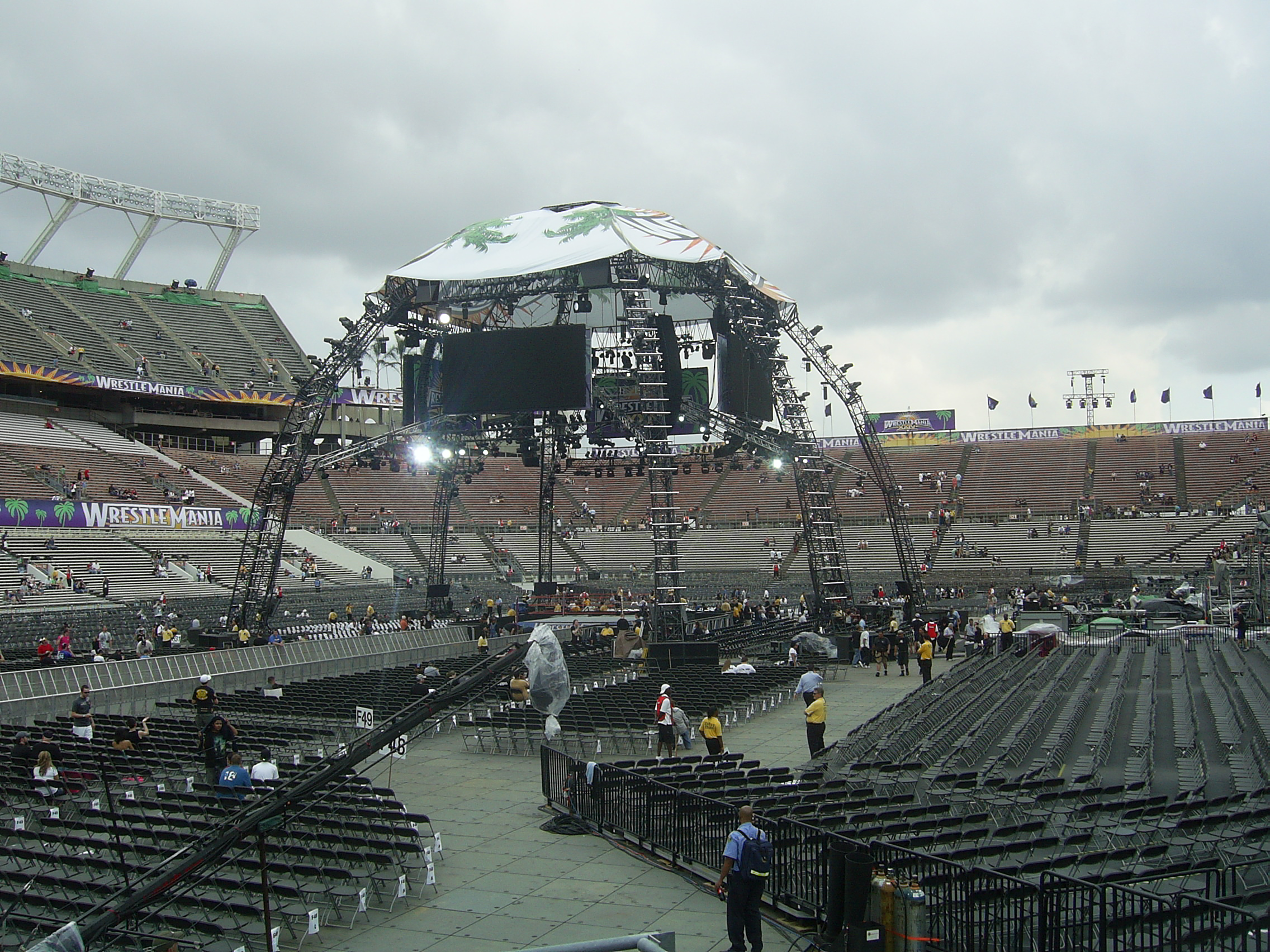
A tarpaulin being used to keep rain off a stage

Tarpaulins are used in many ways to protect persons and things from wind, rain, and sunlight. They are used during construction or after disasters to protect partially built or damaged structures, to prevent mess during painting and similar activities, and to contain and collect debris. They are used to protect the loads of open trucks and wagons, to keep wood piles dry, and for shelters such as tents or other temporary structures.

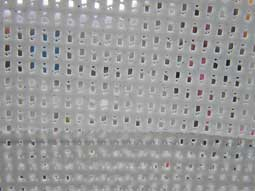
A perforated tarpaulin

Tarpaulins are also used for advertisement printing, most notably for billboards. Perforated tarpaulins are typically used for medium to large advertising, or for protection on scaffoldings; the aim of the perforations (from 20% to 70%) is to reduce wind vulnerability.

Polyethylene tarpaulins have also proven to be a popular resource when an inexpensive, water-resistant fabric is needed. Many amateur builders of plywood sailboats turn to polyethylene tarpaulins for making their sails, as it is inexpensive and easily worked. With the proper type of adhesive tape, it is possible to make a serviceable sail for a small boat with no sewing.

Plastic tarps are sometimes used as a building material in communities of indigenous North Americans. Tipis made with tarps are known as tarpees.

== Types ==
Tarpaulins can be classified based on a diversity of factors, such as material type (polyethylene, canvas, vinyl, etc.), thickness, which is generally measured in mils or generalized into categories (such as "regular duty", "heavy duty", "super heavy duty", etc.), and grommet strength (simple vs. reinforced), among others.

Actual tarp sizes are generally about three to five percent smaller in each dimension than nominal size; for example, a tarp nominally 20 ft × 20 ft (6.1 m × 6.1 m) will actually measure about 19 ft × 19 ft (5.8 m × 5.8 m). Grommets may be aluminum, stainless steel, or other materials. Grommet-to-grommet distances are typically between 18 in (460 mm) and 5 ft (1.5 m). The weave count is often between 8 and 12 per square inch: the greater the count, the greater its strength. Tarps may also be washable or non-washable and waterproof or non-waterproof, and mildewproof vs. non-mildewproof. Tarp flexibility is especially significant under cold conditions.

=== Type of material ===
==== Polyethylene ====
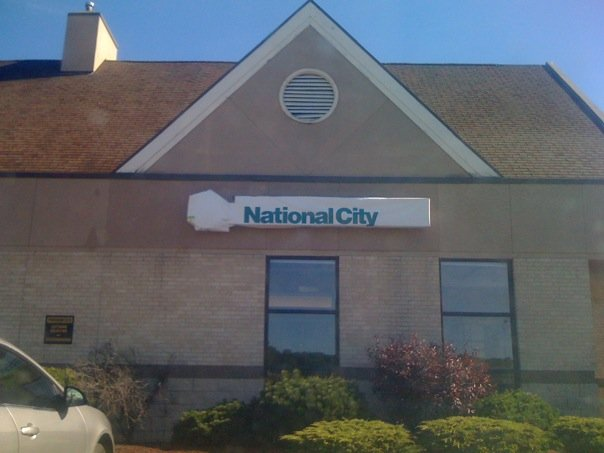
Advertisement printed on a tarp

A polyethylene tarpaulin ("polytarp") is not a traditional fabric, but rather, a laminate of woven and sheet material. The center is loosely woven from strips of polyethylene plastic, with sheets of the same material bonded to the surface. This creates a fabric-like material that resists stretching well in all directions and is waterproof. Sheets can be either of low density polyethylene (LDPE) or high density polyethylene (HDPE). When treated against ultraviolet light, these tarpaulins can last for years exposed to the elements, but non-UV treated material will quickly become brittle and lose strength and water resistance if exposed to sunlight.

==== Canvas ====
Canvas tarpaulins are not 100% waterproof, though they are water resistant. Thus, while a small amount of water for a short period of time will not affect them, when there is standing water on canvas tarps, or when water cannot quickly drain away from canvas tarps, the standing water will drip through this type of tarp.

==== Vinyl ====
Polyvinyl chloride ("vinyl") tarpaulins are industrial-grade and intended for heavy-duty use. They are constructed of 10 oz/sq yd (340 g/m^{2}) coated yellow vinyl. This makes it waterproof and gives it a high abrasion resistance and tear strength. These resist oil, acid, grease and mildew. The vinyl tarp is ideal for agriculture, construction, industrial, trucks, flood barrier and temporary roof repair.

==== Silnylon ====
Tarp tents may be made of silnylon.

=== U.S. color scheme ===
For years manufacturers have used a color code to indicate the grade of tarpaulins, but not all manufacturers follow this traditional method of grading. Following this color-coded system, blue indicates a lightweight tarp, and typically has a weave count of 8×8 and a thickness of 0.005–0.006 in (0.13–0.15 mm). Silver is a heavy-duty tarp and typically has a weave count of 14×14 and a thickness of 0.011–0.012 in (0.28–0.30 mm).

Some of the more common colors in that scheme are:

Color	Name	Approx. thickness
Blue	light-duty tarp	0.005–0.006 in (0.13–0.15 mm)
Yellow or orange	medium-duty tarp	0.007–0.008 in (0.18–0.20 mm)
Green	medium-duty tarp	0.009–0.010 in (0.23–0.25 mm)
Silver	heavy-duty tarp	0.011–0.012 in (0.28–0.30 mm)
Brown	super-heavy-duty tarp	0.016 in (0.41 mm)

== See also ==
- Awning
- Basha (tarpaulin)
- Fly (tent)
- Loue (tent)
- Tarp tent
- Tonneau cover
- Visqueen
