= Turbaza =

Type of holiday camp in former Soviet countries

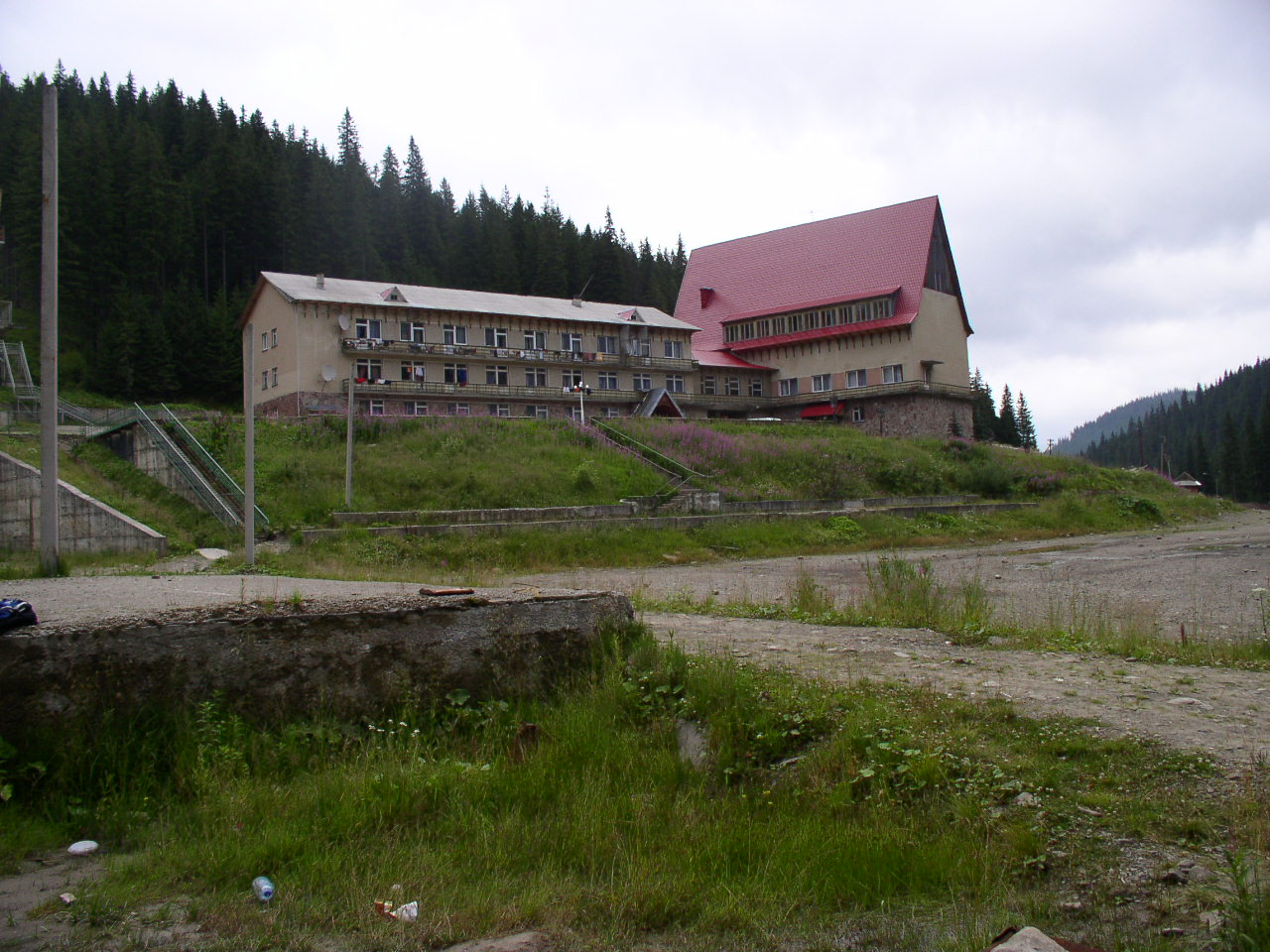
A turbaza in Ukraine

A Turbaza (Russian: Турбаза, Ukrainian: Турбаза; also пансионат) is a holiday accommodation, a type of tourist camp or tourist base that arose in the Soviet era and is still common in the post-Soviet countries. Turbazas are commonly leased-out to groups or firms renting the entire facility to provide holiday accommodation for their members or employees. They are generally rustic, located in rural areas that offer outdoor recreation. Dining, and often sleeping, is accommodated in a large, open, common area.

== See also ==
- List of human habitation forms
