= Gerda Havertong =

Dutch-Surinamese actress and presenter

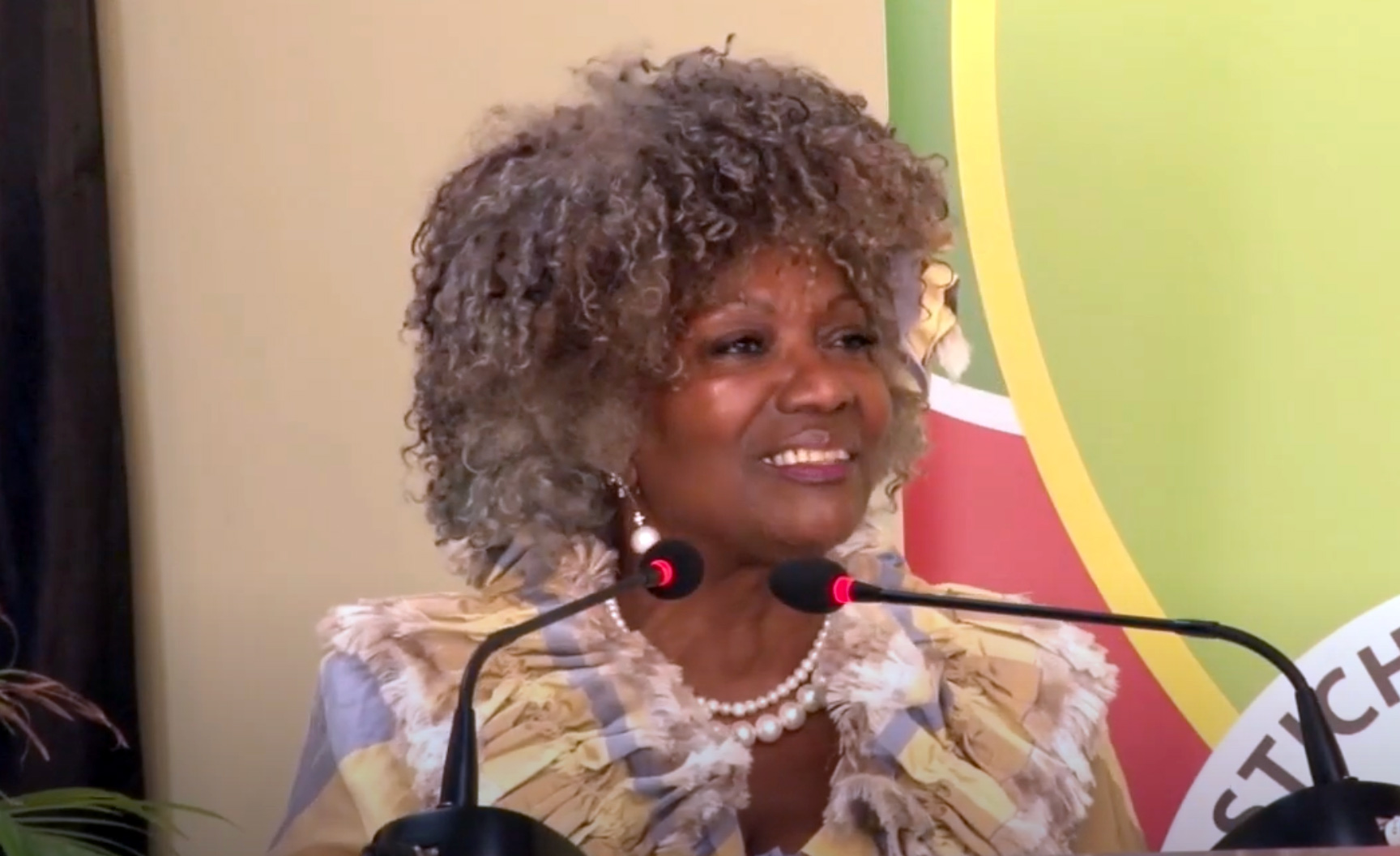
- Havertong opens a centre for people with dementia in Paramaribo, Surinam in February 2020
- Born: 23 October 1946 (age 79); Paramaribo, Suriname
- Occupations: Actress; Storyteller; Presenter
- Years active: 1976–present
- Known for: Playing Gerda / Peetje in Sesamstraat

Gerda Alexandra Havertong (Paramaribo, Surinam - 23 October 1946) is a Dutch-Surinamese actress, television presenter, actress and singer. She is well known for being a recurring character in Sesamstraat, the Dutch version of Sesame Street, since 1984.

== Biography ==
=== Early life ===
Havertong was born in 1946 in Paramaribo, Surinam when it was still a Dutch colony. In 1966 Havertong moved to The Hague, the Netherlands. She studied to become a schoolteacher at the University of Amsterdam and graduated 1974. After her studies she worked as a preschool teacher in Amsterdam. During her time in Amsterdam she played in amateur theatre groups.

In 1975 Havertong returned to Surinam with her husband. In 1977 she sang a song in the Sranan Tongo language in the television series Kon hesi baka - Kom gauw terug. She also joined the Doe-theater troupe in Paramaribo.

=== Professional career ===
In 1979 Havertong returned to the Netherlands and started her professional career as an actress. In 1984 she appeared for the first time in the 2.500th episode of Sesamstraat. In 1988 and 1989 she acted in the Dutch educational show Het Klokhuis, where she also sang the theme tune.

In 1987 Havertong spoke out against the character of Zwarte Piet (Black Pete) in an episode of Sesamstraat, more than thirty years before this became a large public debate in the Netherlands.

In 1999 Havertong founded Stichting Wiesje (Wiesje Foundation), a foundation that helps people in Surinam who suffer from dementia, as a remembrance for her mother who suffered from the disease. In 2020 the foundation opened a centre for dementia patients in Paramaribo.
