= Basha (tarpaulin) =

Shelter made from waterproof canvas or plastic

A basha is a waterproof canvas or plastic sheet with eyelets or loops on the perimeter, which is used in camping, outdoor, or military situations to act as a shelter, in the form of an impromptu tent and/or groundsheet, usually supported with rope or even bungee cords attached to trees.

== Application ==
Bashas are used by the military, particularly the British Army, the Australian Army (colloquially known as a "hooch", "hoochie," or "hutchie"), the New Zealand Army, and the Singapore Armed Forces as a shelter while in the field or on operations. They are lightweight and can be put up rapidly, and camouflaged simply with foliage specific to the area of operation. Their low profile gives them a small silhouette, and many are also infrared reflective, which makes them, and their occupants, less visible to infrared detection equipment. Normally bashas are erected in woods, as the trees both serve to give visual cover and support the basha through bungee cords or rope. Because they are nearly invisible if well camouflaged, they are ideal for forming covert observation posts.

== Etymology ==
The word 'basha' is an Assamese word meaning a 'hut' but this term was adopted more generally for a makeshift temporary shelter by the British military. The Assamese word refers to a range of naturally fabricated shelters made of bamboo and palm materials, but it most probably first entered British Army vocabulary to mean a temporary shelter by Chindits operating behind enemy lines in Burma, with the sheet taking its name from this usage. Wider usage and adoption then came during the Malayan Campaign (1950–1959) where many ex-Chindits were recruited to fight the communist insurgents in the jungles. Alternatively the French word 'bâche' means tarpaulin and comes ultimately from Latin.

== See also ==
- Tarp tent
- Bivouac sack
