= Bivouac shelter =

Improvised shelter

A bivouac shelter or bivvy (alternately bivy, bivi, bivvi) is any of a variety of improvised camp site or shelter that is usually of a temporary nature, used especially by soldiers or people engaged in backpacking, bikepacking, scouting or mountain climbing. It may often refer to sleeping in the open with a bivouac sack, but it may also refer to a shelter constructed of natural materials like a structure of branches to form a frame, which is then covered with leaves, ferns and similar material for waterproofing and duff (leaf litter) for insulation. Modern bivouacs often involve the use of one- or two-person tents but may also be without tents or full cover. In modern mountaineering the nature of the bivouac shelter will depend on the level of preparedness, in particular whether existing camping and outdoor gear may be incorporated into the shelter.

== Etymology ==
The word bivouac is French and ultimately derives from an 18th-century Swiss German usage of Beiwacht (bei by, Wacht watch or patrol). It referred to an additional watch that would be maintained by a military or civilian force to increase vigilance at an encampment. Following use by the troops of the British Empire the term became also known as bivvy for short.

== Construction ==
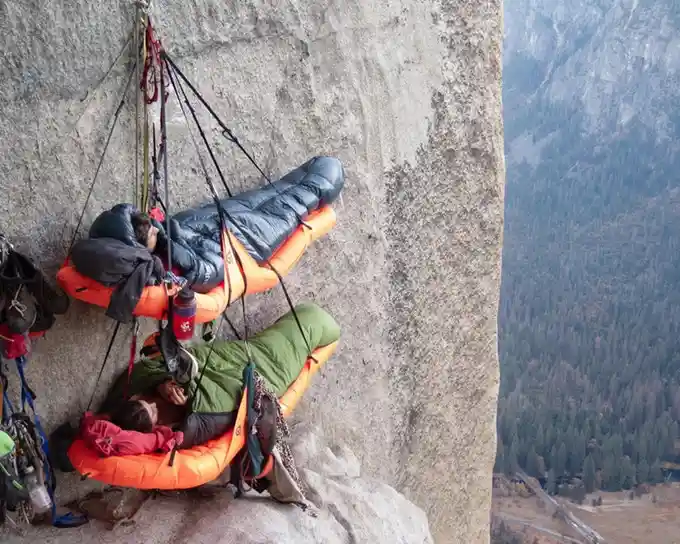
Climbers using a 'hanging bivouac' at Camp 5 on The Nose of El Capitan

Artificial bivouacs can be constructed using a variety of available materials from corrugated iron sheeting or plywood, to groundsheets or a purpose-made basha. Although these have the advantage of being speedy to erect and resource-efficient, they have relatively poor insulation properties.

There are many different ways to put up a bivouac shelter. The most common method is to use one bivouac sheet as the roof of the shelter and a second as the groundsheet. The 'roof' flysheet is suspended along its ridge line by a cord tied between two trees which are a suitable distance apart. The four corners of the flysheet are then either pegged out or tied down to other trees. Care must be taken to leave a gap between the ground and the sheet to ensure that there is enough air flow to stop condensation.

A basha is a simple tent, made from one or two sheets of waterproof fabric and some strong cord. Generally a basha is made of reinforced nylon with eyelets and loops or tabs located along all four sides of the sheet and sometimes across the two central lines of symmetry. The basha is an extremely versatile shelter that can be erected in many different ways to suit the particular conditions of the location. (The word also sometimes refers to a special type of bivouac sack described below).

== Bivouac sack ==
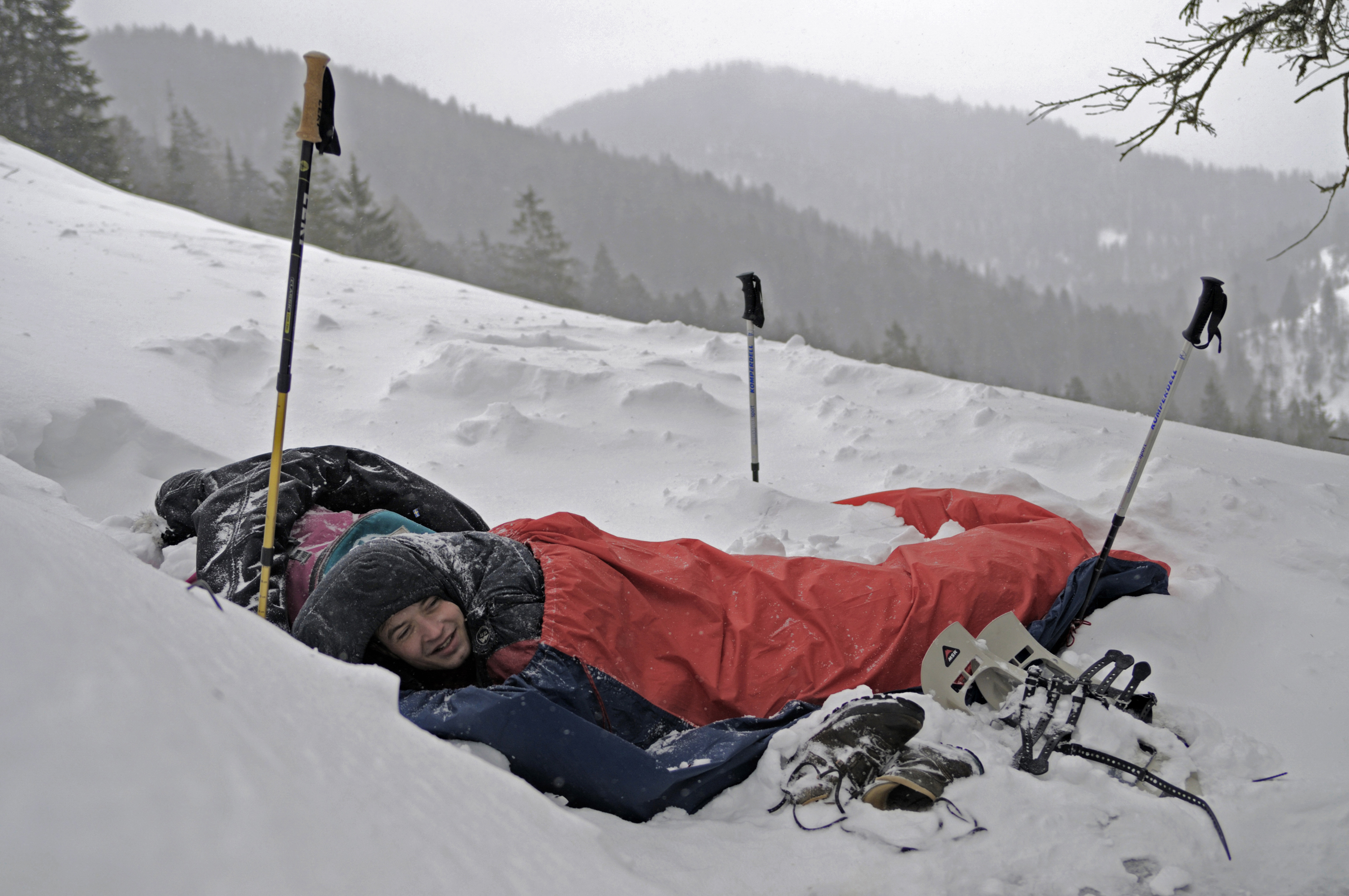
A bivouac sack (in red) covering a man within a sleeping bag in Benediktenwand, Germany

A bivouac sack or bivvy bag is a smaller type of bivouac shelter. Generally it is a portable, lightweight, waterproof shelter, and an alternative to larger bivouac shelters. The main benefit of a bivouac sack shelter is speed of setup and ability to use in a tiny space as compared to tent-like shelters. A bivouac sack is therefore a common choice for hikers, cyclists or climbers who have to camp in tight areas, or in unknown areas. A bivouac sack will usually have a thin waterproof fabric shell that is designed to slip over a sleeping bag, providing an additional 5 to 10 °C of insulation and forming an effective barrier against wind chill and rain.

A drawback of a simple bivouac sack is the humidity that condenses on the inner side, leaving the occupant or the sleeping bag moist. Moisture severely decreases the insulating effect of sleeping bags. This problem has been alleviated somewhat in recent years with the advent of more waterproof, but breathable fabrics, such as Gore-Tex, which allow some humidity to pass through the fabric while blocking most external water. A traditional bivouac bag typically cinches all the way down to the user's face, leaving only a small hole to breathe or look through. Other bivouac sacks have a mesh screen at the face area to allow for outside visibility and airflow, while still protecting from insects.

Since the 1980s, an increasing number of militaries including those of the US, UK and many European countries include bivouac sacks as part of their standard issue travelling sleep systems. These frequently are designed to attach to the same military's standard issue sleeping bags, and allow soldiers on expedition or away from base camp to keep their entire sleep kit in one individual and low profile system.

== Boofen ==
In the German region of Saxon Switzerland in the Elbe Sandstone Mountains, climbers refer to overnighting in the open air as Boofen (pronounced "bo-fen"). The spot selected for overnight stays usually comprises an overhang in the sandstone rock or a cave, the so-called Boofe ("bo-fe"). This has often been adapted with a sleeping area and fireplace. In the national park itself, Boofen is only permitted at designated sites and only in connection with climbing, although in this case lighting fires is absolutely forbidden. The colloquial Saxon word boofen is a cognate of pofen (to sleep soundly and for a long time).

== Examples ==
Count Henry Russell-Killough, the "hermit of the Pyrenees", is broadly credited with the invention of the bivouac in extreme, inhospitable places. He would bivouac in the open, creating a blanket of rocks and earth or using a simple bag.

An example of a bivouac being made in a time of urgency was shown when the climber Hermann Buhl made his ascent of Nanga Parbat in 1953 and was forced to bivouac alone on a rock ledge at 8,000 metres (26,000 ft) altitude, in order to survive until the following morning.

Modern bivouacs have evolved to offer heightened levels of comfort for climbers and explorers. Modern portaledges (the vertical camping version of a tent) are a more comfortable, safer, and sturdier option to hanging hammocks.

== See also ==
- Bothy
- Shelter half
- Swag (bedroll)
- Mountain hut
- Wilderness hut
- Portaledge
- Ultralight backpacking
