= Loue (tent) =

Ultra-light Finnish open tent

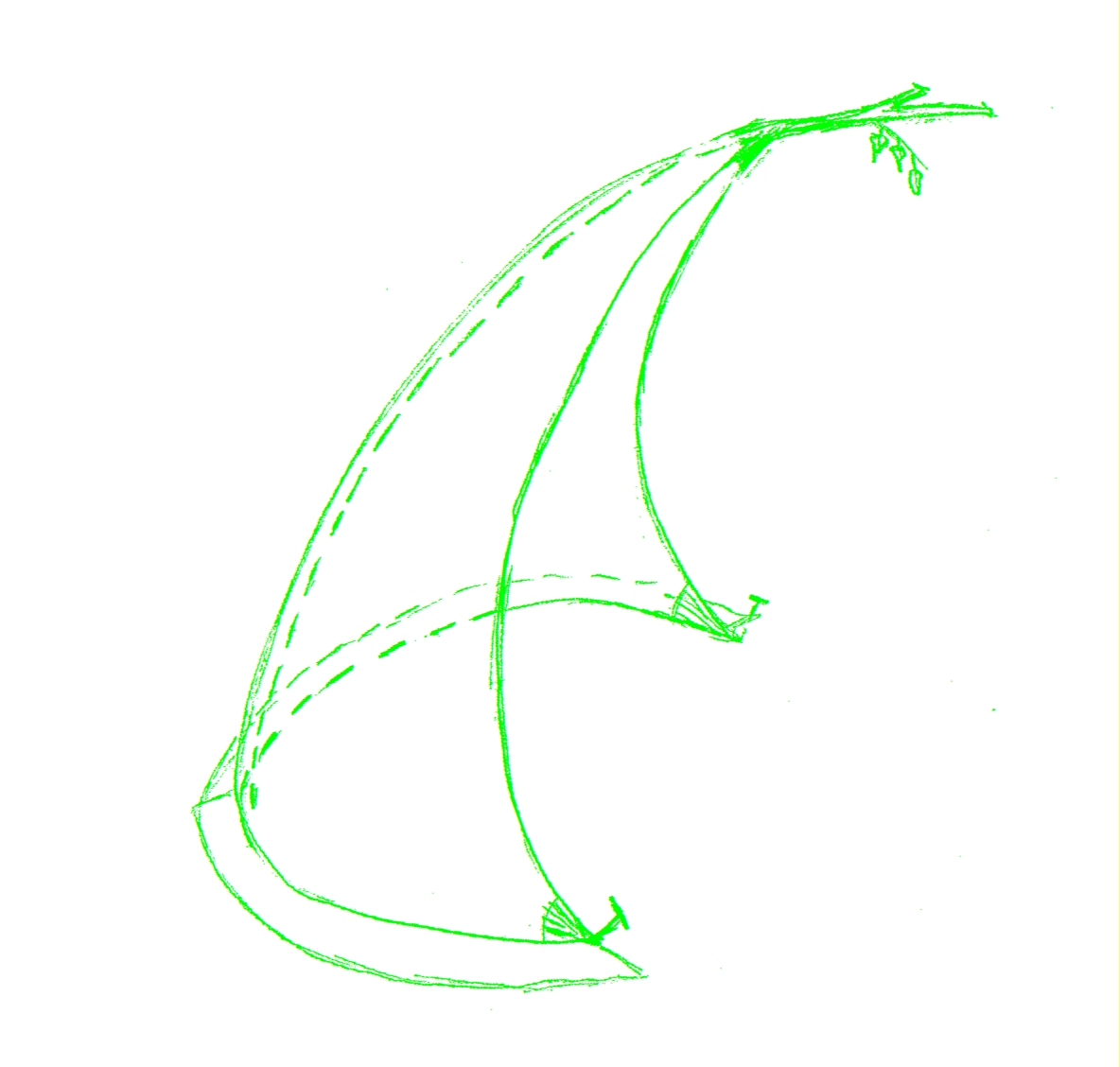
Illustrative drawing of a loue

A loue or loude is an ultra-light Finnish open tent-like shelter. It is used to give reasonable protection from wind and rain during a variety of outdoor activities, including camping, canoeing, hiking and hunting.

== History ==
While the open canvas shelter is not uniquely Finnish, the shape of modern loue was developed by writer Aarne Erkki Järvinen and presented for the first time in Metsästys ja kalastus magazine in 1931. After World War II, the loue was popular in Finland among boy scouts and through books of Kullervo Kemppinen and Olli Aulio. The loue has points in common with the Forester tent created in the 1910s.

Originally the loue was made out of cotton tent canvas, later nylon fabric. Later designs incorporate a reflective silver lining to make the space warmer.

== Overview ==
Loues are popular with Scout groups and minimalist campers. Suitable as one or two person shelters, they are compact, light (2.2 lbs or 1 kg) and can be set up and taken down in a basic way fairly quickly. The workman-like sets shown in photographs indicate that more effort can be made to stiffen the sides and the stakes and lines used can complicate a taut setup. The open front permits fire viewing, ventilation and looking out over a scenic view.

== Structure ==
A loue consists of a roughly conical section of fabric with the semi-circular bottom edge grounded by stakes and the tip raised with a single pole. Suitable standing tree trunks may be used to suspend the tent if an open campfire is not to be used. This style of ''tarp tent" can best be raised using a scissors-pole assembly. A pole suspension system allows for positioning an open fire in front of the shelter without the risk of damaging tree trunks or roots. The panels of a true Finnish loue are designed to provide a semi-circular short wall around the shelter and a triangular piece at the tip can be let down to provide a little more shelter in front. With suitable siting and careful staking and tensioning, the side walls can be set close to the ground, providing protection from drafts and lifting from winds.

It is possible to use a camp fire for warmth and cooking, provided that the loue is upwind. In the summertime, a mosquito net may be used for comfort.

== See also ==
- Fly (tent)
- Outdoor recreation

== Bibliography ==
- Erätulien loisteessa, Aarne Erkki Järvinen, WSOY 1955
- Poropolku kutsuu, Kullervo Kemppinen, WSOY, 1961
- Partiolaisen kirja, Olli Aulio, Gummerus 1976
