= Hammock camping =

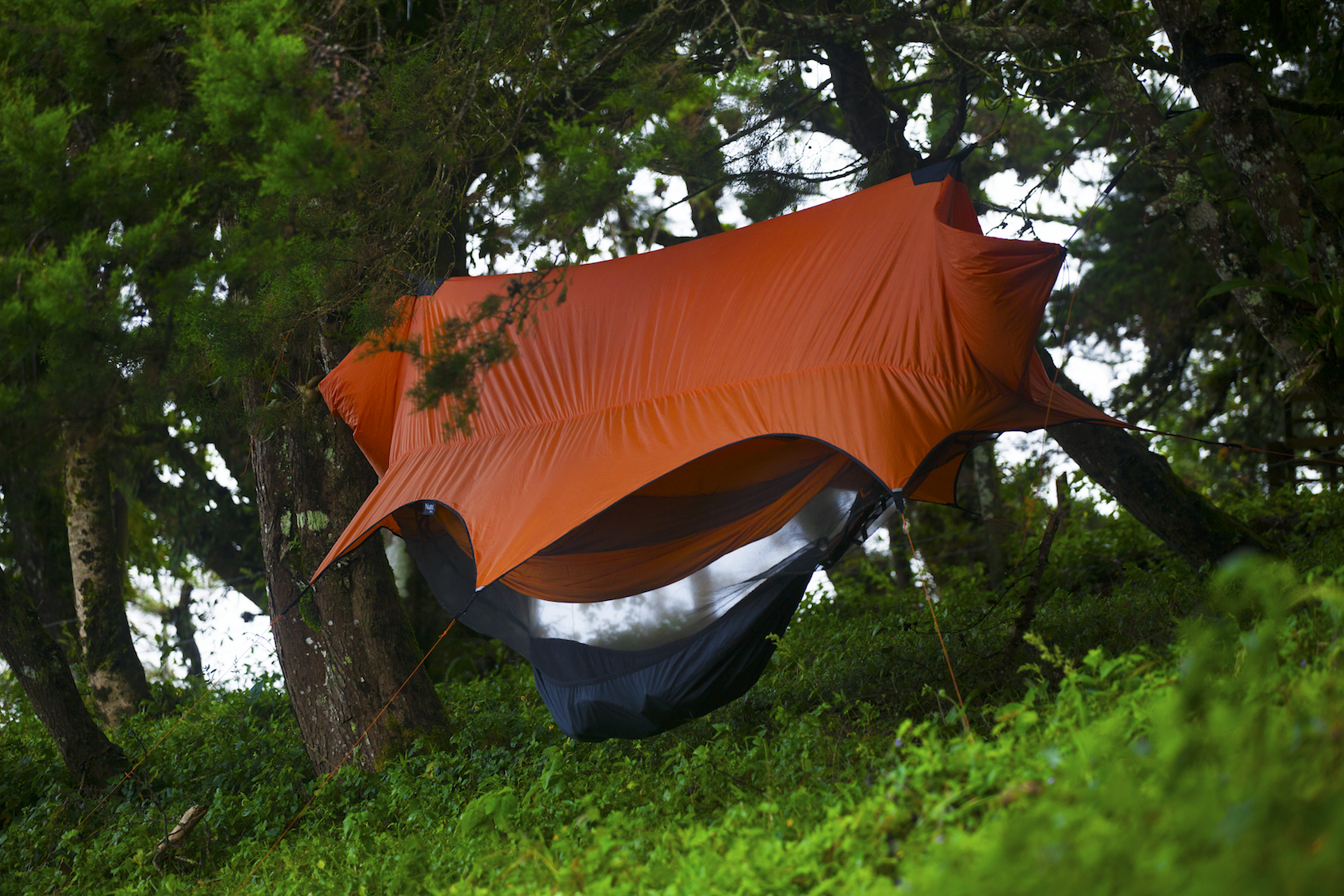
A specialized hammock shelter, also known as a tree tent

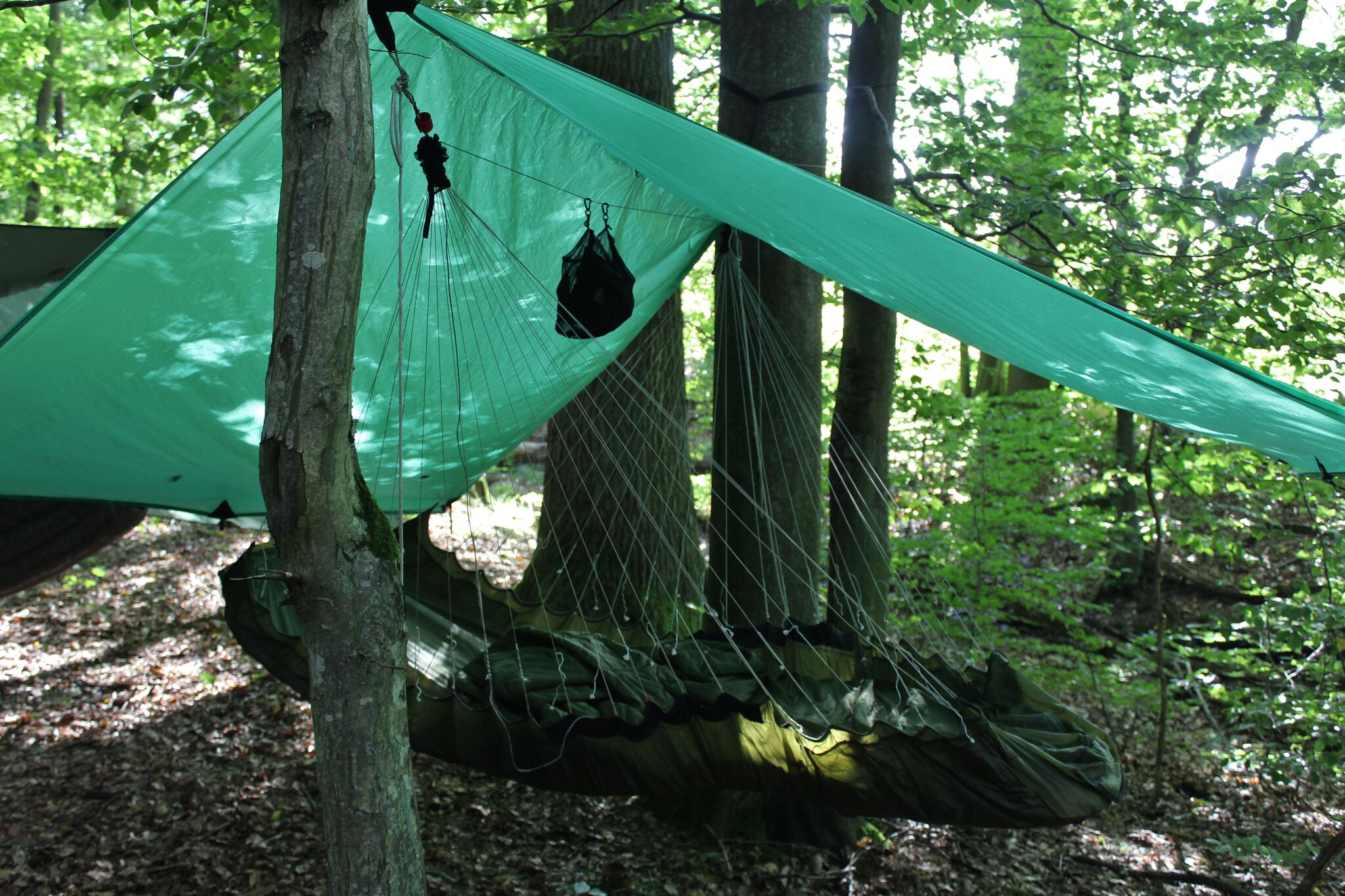
A 90 degree hammock with suspension on the long sides

Hammock camping is a form of camping in which a camper sleeps in a suspended hammock rather than a conventional tent on the ground. Due to the absence of poles and the reduced amount of material used, hammocks can be lighter than a tent, though this is not always the case. Most hammocks will also require less space in a pack than a similar occupancy tent. In foul weather, a tarp is suspended above the hammock to keep the rain off of the camper. Mosquito netting, sometimes integrated into the camping hammock itself, is also used as climatic conditions warrant. Camping hammocks are used by campers who are looking for lighter weight, protection from ground-dwelling insects, or other ground complications such as sloped ground, rocky terrain and flooded terrain.

== History ==
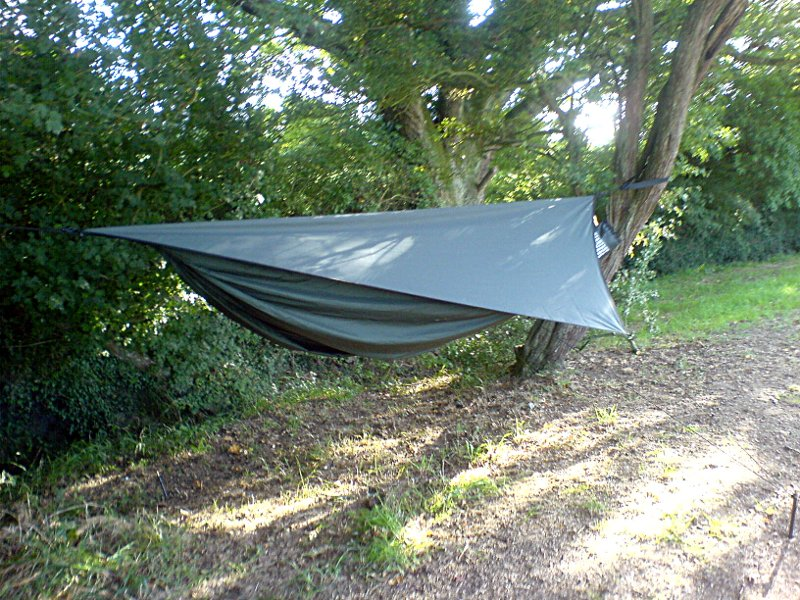
A hammock suspended between two trees, complete with tarpaulin

The hammock was developed in Pre-Columbian Latin America and continues to be produced widely throughout the region, among the Urarina of the Peruvian Amazon, for several years in Ghana, and presently throughout North America, Europe, and Australia. The origin of the hammock remains unknown, though many maintain that it was created out of tradition and need. The word hammock comes from hamaca, a Taino Indian word which means "thrown fishing net". On long fishing trips, the Taíno would sleep in their nets, safe from snakes and other dangerous creatures.

== Appeal of hammock camping ==
The primary appeal of hammock camping for most users is comfort and better sleep, as compared to sleeping on a pad on the ground. Enthusiasts argue that hammocks don't harm the environment in the way that conventional tents do. Most hammocks attach to trees via removable webbing straps, or "tree-huggers," which do not damage the bark and leave little or no marks afterward. Whereas it's easy to see a frequently used campground because of the effect on the grass, scrub and topsoil, the presence of a hammock camping site is much harder to detect. This has found favour with hikers and campers who follow the principles of Leave No Trace camping. Hammock camping also opens up many more sites for campers - stony ground, slopes, and so on - as well as keeping them off the ground and away from small mammals, reptiles and insects. Sleeping off the ground also keeps the camper out of any rainwater runoff that might seep in under a tent during a downpour. The relatively light weight of hammocks makes them ideal for reducing backpack weight, making it a good option for ultralight backpacking enthusiasts.

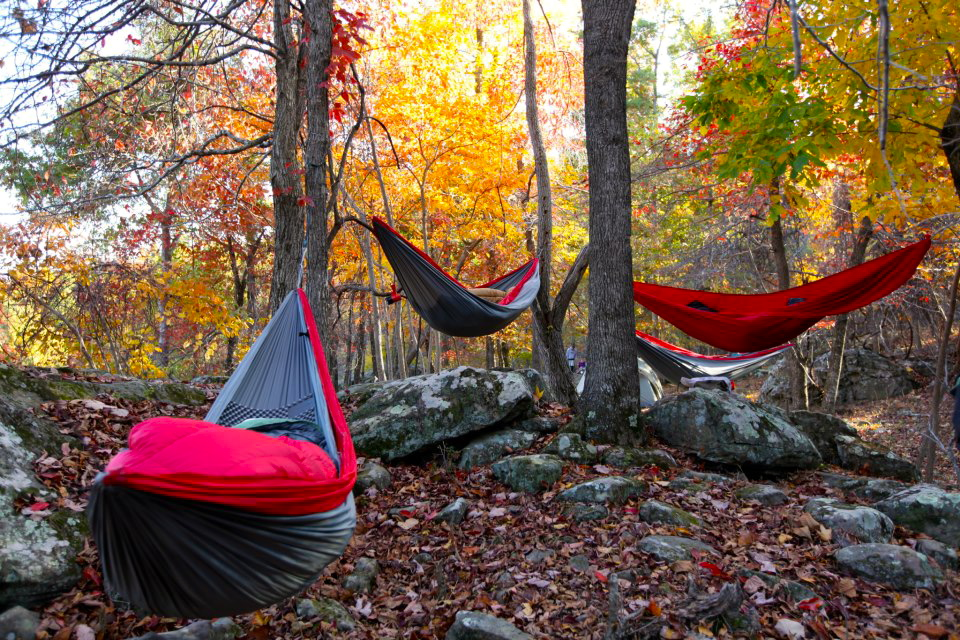
Three hammock campers in various positions

One of the benefits of hammock camping, however, can also be a significant drawback. A suspended hammock allows for a cooling air flow to surround the camper in hot weather. However, this also makes it harder to stay warm when temperatures plummet, either during the evening or seasonally, as a sleeping bag will be compressed under a camper's weight, reducing its ability to trap air and provide insulation.

When deciding to commit to hammock camping most "hangers" trade their sleeping bags for down-filled or synthetic quilts. The quilts are divided into two different types, top quilts (TQ) and under quilts (UQ). The UQ is suspended underneath the hammock so the weight of the hanger doesn't compress the baffles, thus providing air pockets for one's body to heat and keep one warm. Concurrently the TQ is just a down blanket, with some having the ability to make a small box for the feet. Essentially, it is just the top half of a sleeping bag. Because a sleeping bag's underside is compressed, it loses its insulating properties. A TQ cuts the unnecessary material to save weight and fabric. The TQ/UQ sleep system is not only warm, but each quilt packs into the size of a grapefruit, or smaller, depending on temperature rating. Some hammocks are designed with an extra layer of fabric, or a series of large pockets, on the bottom. Insulating material, such as foam, quilting, aluminum windscreen reflectors, clothes, or even dead leaves and brush from the campsite is stuffed between the bottom layers or inside the bottom pockets to create a buffer between the camper and the cold outside air. While the above solutions, except for the found materials, add weight and bulk to the hammock, some approaches use an ultralight open cell foam with a mylar space blanket to mitigate this increase in weight.

Another drawback is that a camping hammock requires two trees close enough to hang it from, and strong enough to support the sleeper's weight. This can be a limitation depending on the environment; at higher elevations, trees are more sparse. In these situations hammock campers may bring along a light groundsheet and "go to ground" using their hammock as a ground tent.

== Suspension systems, tarpaulins, and amenities ==
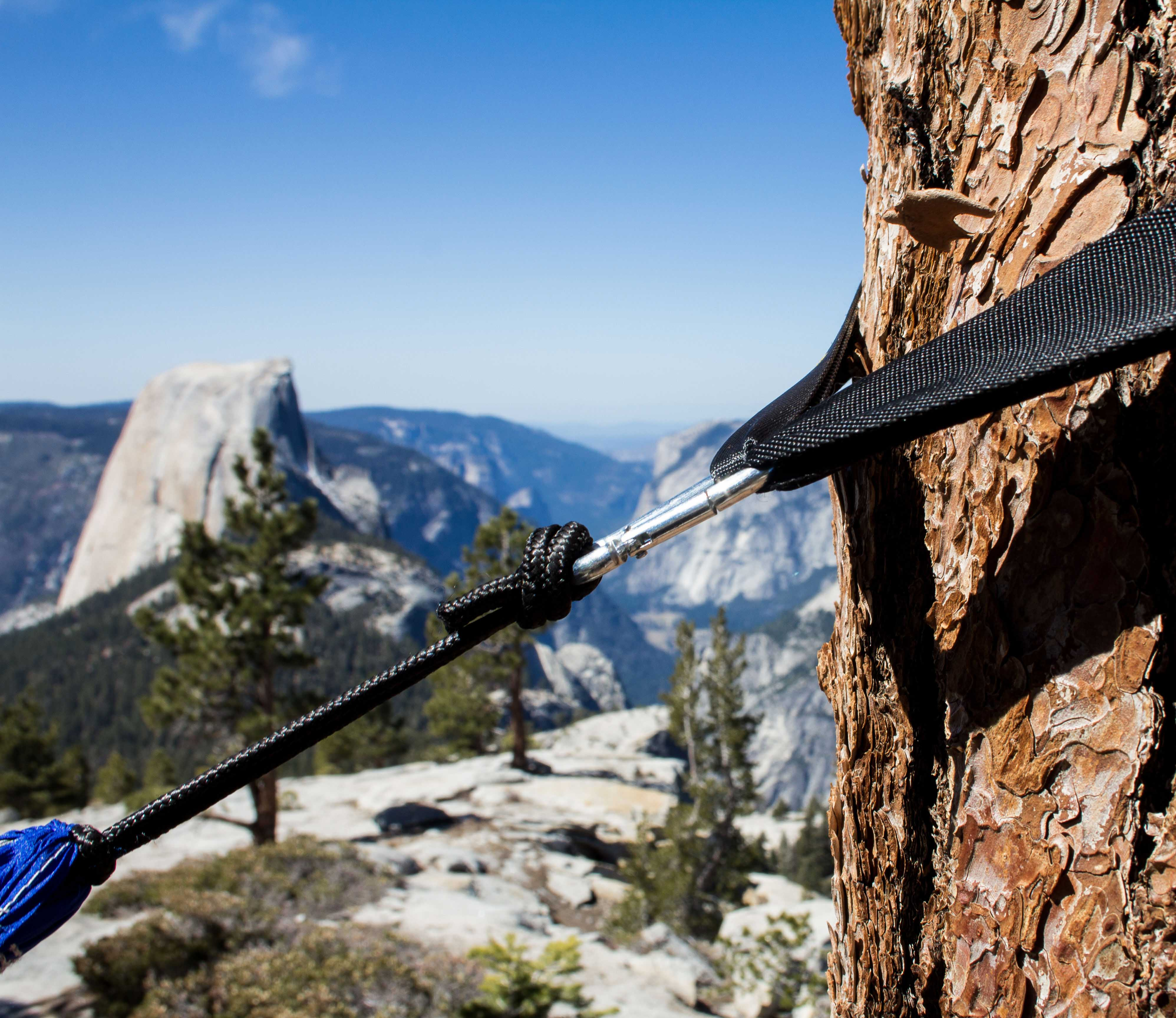
Hammock carabiner clipped on "tree-hugger straps" or tree webbing

One of the unique concepts of hammock camping is the new diversity of suspension systems and add-ons which campers use in making their hammock set-up unique and functional. The line on which the hammock's weight is held is often swapped for a variety of lighter weight suspension made of Dyneema or other UHMWPE material. These reduce both weight and bulk. Many use similar lines formed into a constriction knot (colloquially referred to by the brand name "Whoopie Slings") for quick adjustment and setup. These may be connected to the webbing straps ("tree huggers") using a lightweight toggle or a carabiner, or more uniquely designed connectors such as Evo loops or specialized metal hardware.

Some hammocks are designed with a dedicated tarpaulin. Others come without a tarpaulin, with the understanding the user will select the size and style of tarpaulin which best fits their needs. There are many ways in which hammock campers hang their tarpaulin. In some, the tarpaulin is connected to the hammock's suspension line using a system of mitten hooks and plastic connectors. In others the tarpaulin is hung separately using either the hammock's integrated ridge line, or a separate ridge line placed under or over the tarpaulin.

Some tarps have an asymmetrical pattern which matches the shape of the hammock, but the majority of hammock campers use a hex-shaped tarpaulin, many of which have a catenary shape for strength against wind and reduction in size and weight. The diamond-shape tarpaulin is also used by some.

Additional amenities for tarpaulins include removable tarpaulin doors (nylon pieces added to the main openings in cold or windy weather). Different designs of tarpaulin line tensioners are sometimes used to keep tarpaulin lines tight.

== See also ==
- Tree tent
