= Hammock =

Sling used for swinging, sleeping or resting

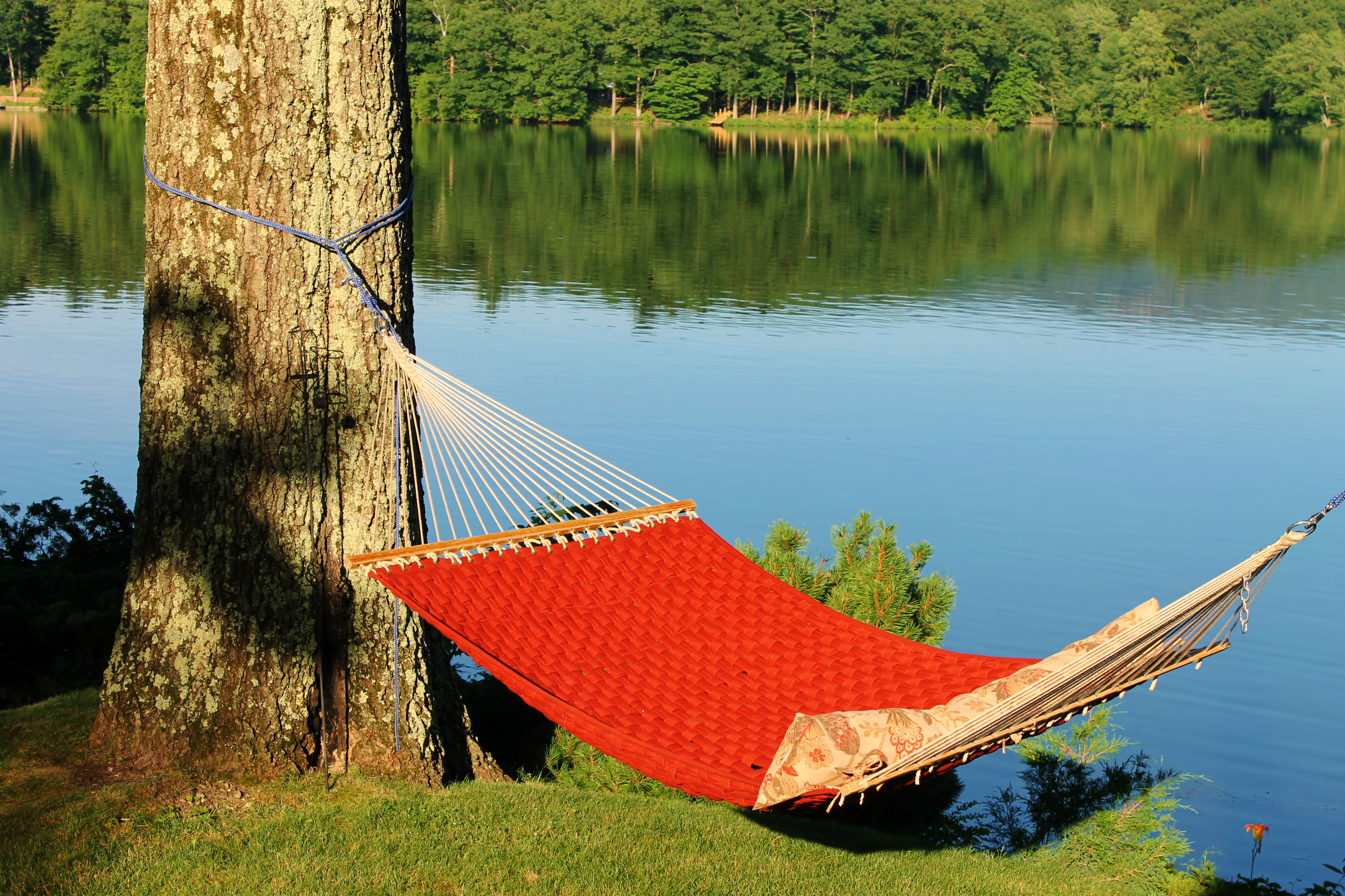
Hammock with a lakeside view

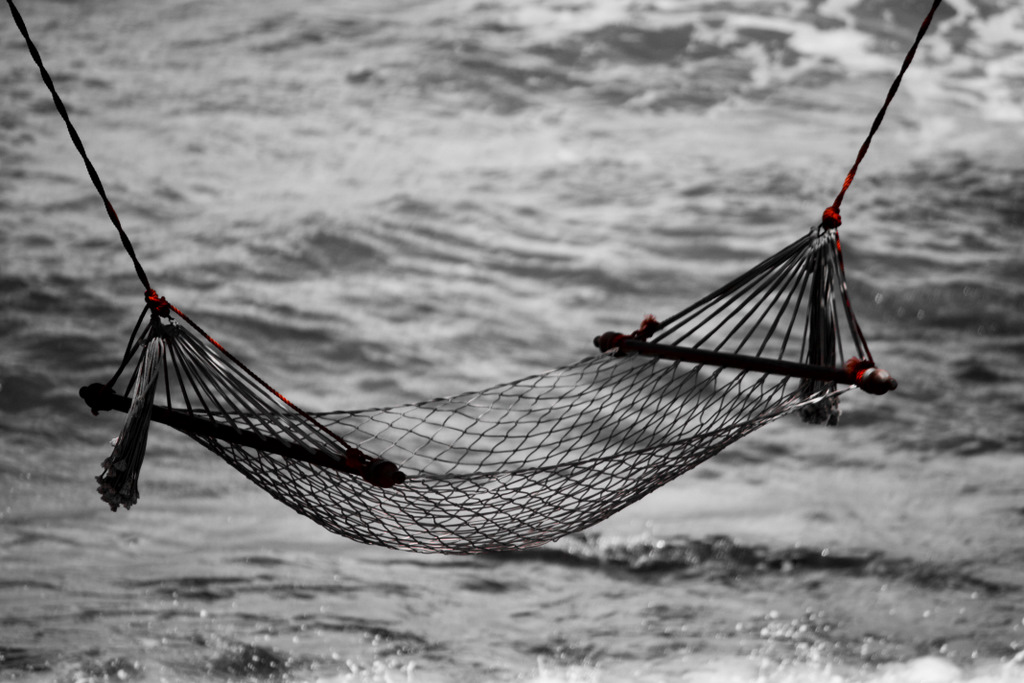
Hammock beside the beach

A hammock, from Spanish hamaca, borrowed from Taíno and Arawak hamaka, is a sling made of fabric, rope, or netting, suspended between two or more points, used for swinging, sleeping, or resting. It normally consists of one or more cloth panels, or a woven network of twine or thin rope stretched with ropes between two firm anchor points such as trees or posts. Hammocks were developed by native inhabitants of the Americas for sleeping, as well as the English. Later, they were used aboard ships by sailors to enable comfort and maximize available space, by explorers or soldiers travelling in wooded regions and eventually by parents in the early 1920s for containing babies just learning to crawl. Today they are popular around the world for relaxation; they are also used as a lightweight bed on camping trips. The hammock is often seen as a symbol of summer, leisure, relaxation and simple, easy living.

== Etymology ==
The word hammock comes, via Spanish, from a Taíno Arawakan word from Santo Domingo meaning 'stretch of cloth' from the Arawak root -maka while ha- indicated the action of hanging. The Amerindian origin of the word was often obscured in English-language sources from the late 18th century onward. Samuel Johnson claimed that it was of Saxon origin, but his etymology was soon debunked. Hamaka was meaningfully transformed into modern German Hängematte, Swedish Hängmatta and Dutch Hangmat, and calqued from Swedish into Finnish riippumatto (all literally hanging mat).

== History ==
=== Europe ===
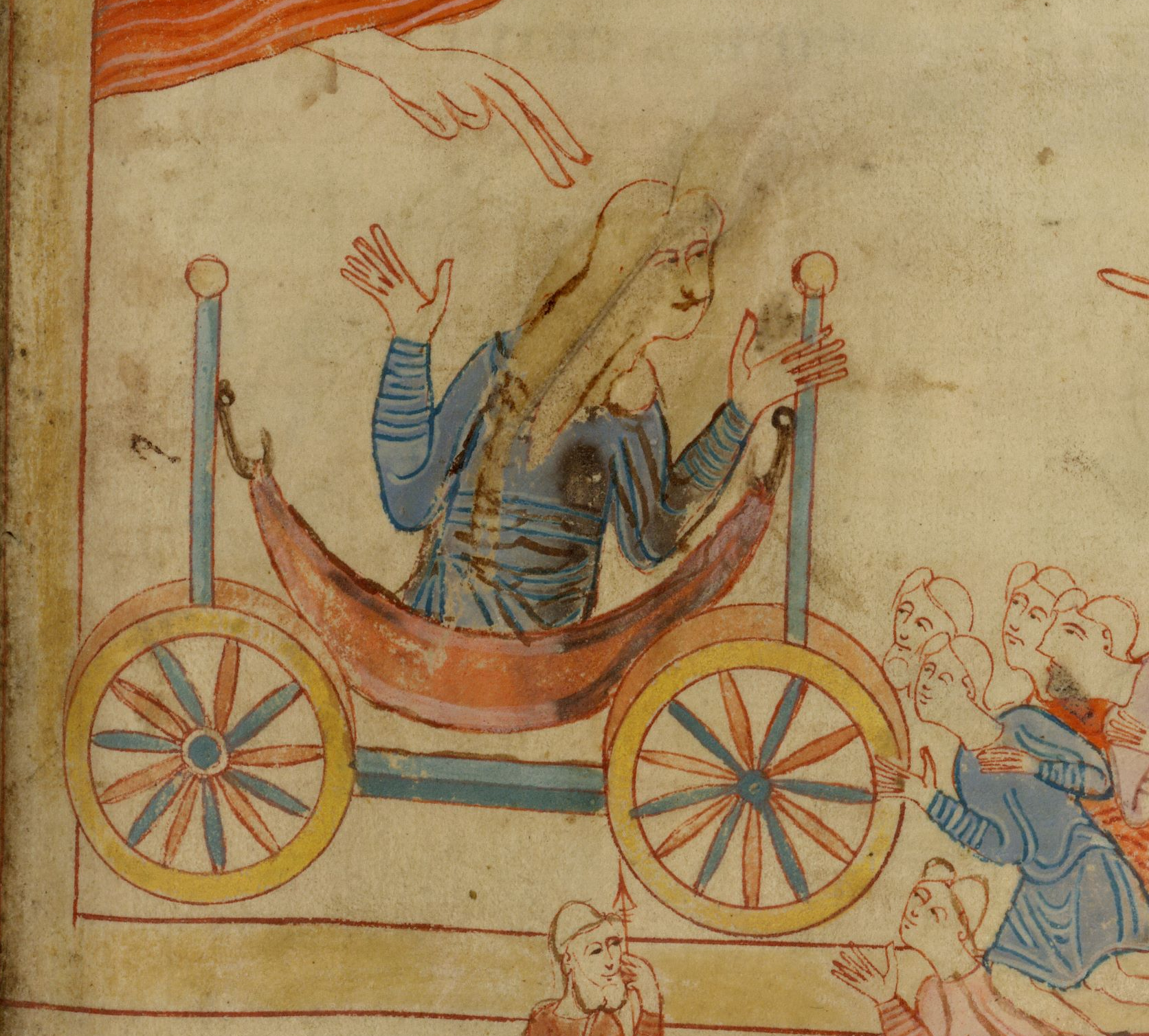
Joseph in a hammock on wheels (Hexateuch, 11th century)

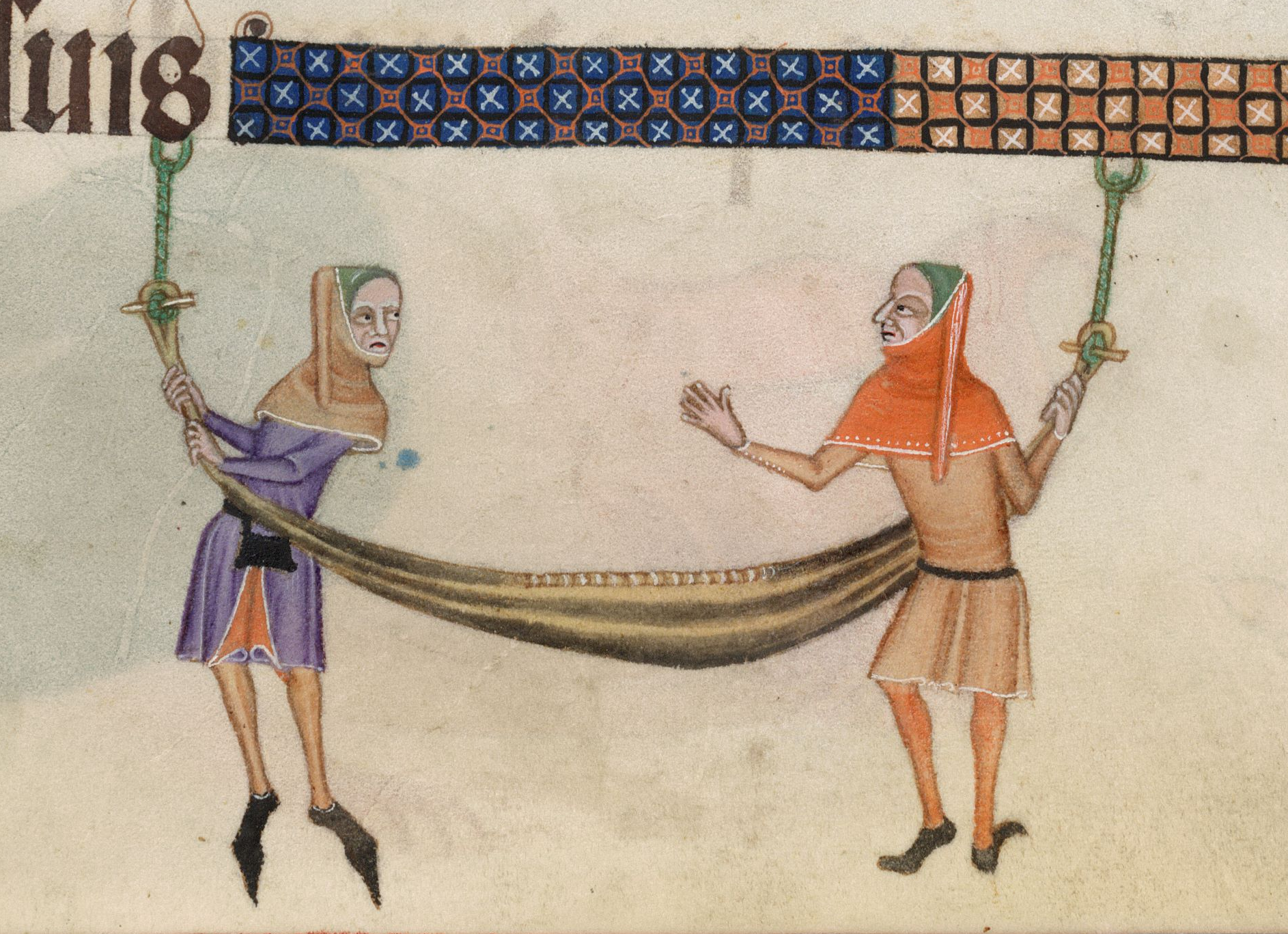
Hammock in the Luttrell Psalter (c. 1330)

Some 19th-century authors attributed the invention of the hammock to the Athenian politician Alcibiades (d. 404 BC). This was inferred from Plutarch, who wrote that Alcibiades had his galley bed hung from ropes, but did not specifically describe it as a net or sling. Other ancient writers mention the use of hanging beds to improve sleep or health without giving details on their mode of suspension.

The 11th-century Old English Hexateuch shows the biblical Joseph, promoted to the "second chariot" of the pharaoh (that is second in command), in a simple type of vehicle, the body of which seems to be a cloth hammock. The piece is suspended on two hooks attached to two opposite posts rising from the chassis. The hammock motif is repeated in the manuscript in a series of increasingly abstract miniatures, leaving it open to interpretation whether the artist had in mind a wheeled hammock litter or a rudimentary coach with a flexible suspension.

The hammock reappears in unequivocal form in another medieval English source, the Luttrell Psalter (dated to c. 1330), where it has developed to a regular hanging bed. The sling now ends in two rope beckets that anticipate the rings of the naval hammock. Like the earliest known naval specimen the fabric is canvas, not the netting the Spanish later encountered in the New World. The Dutch historian of technology André Sleeswyk argues that it may have been this English type that eventually spread through the European navies despite the word hammock later being adopted from the Americas:

It may be significant that in the first official mention of hammocks in the Royal Navy of 1597 they are not referred to under that name, but as 'hanging cabbons or beddes'. The medieval canvas hammock may have been an English invention which was not known on the continent when Columbus made his voyage. In the course of the seventeenth century its use spread to the navies of Western Europe, and eventually it was given the same name as the Caribbean hammock of netting which came to Europe when Columbus returned.

=== New World ===
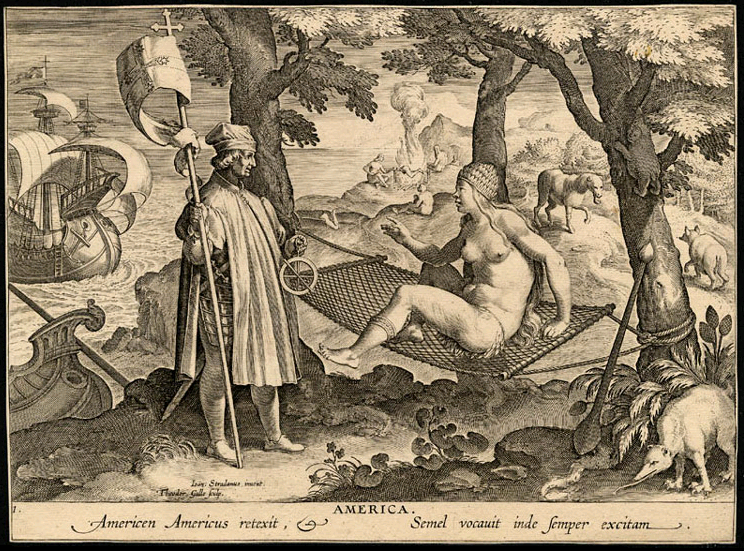
The hammock as an icon of America herself: engraving by Theodor Galle after Stradanus, c. 1630

Spanish colonists noted the use of the hammock by Native Americans, particularly in the West Indies, at the time of the Spanish conquest.

Columbus, in the narrative of his first voyage, says: "A great many Indians in canoes came to the ship to-day for the purpose of bartering their cotton, and hamacas, or nets, in which they sleep." He observed the widespread use of hammocks during his travels among the Taino people in the Bahamas.

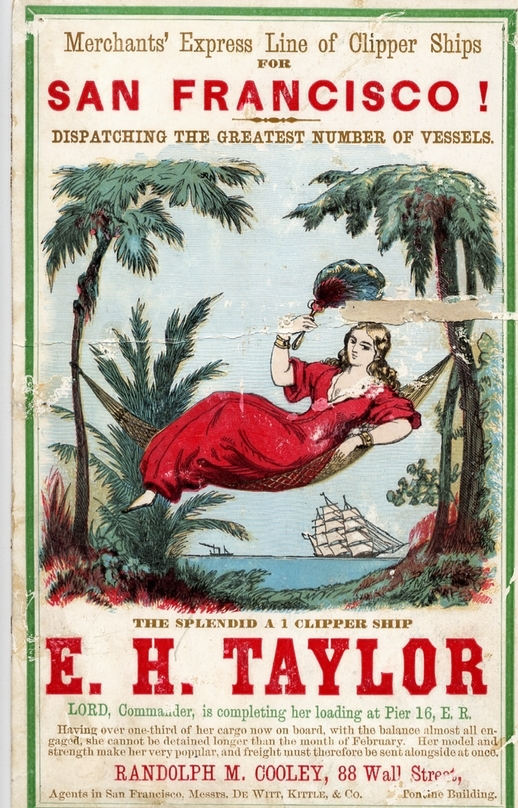
A hammock in clipper ship days

Early hammocks were woven out of tree bark, and later this material was replaced by sisal fibers because it was more abundant. One of the reasons that hammocks became popular in Central and South America was their ability to provide safety from disease transmission, insect stings, or animal bites. By suspending their beds above ground, inhabitants were better protected from snakes, biting ants, and other harmful creatures.

=== Naval ===
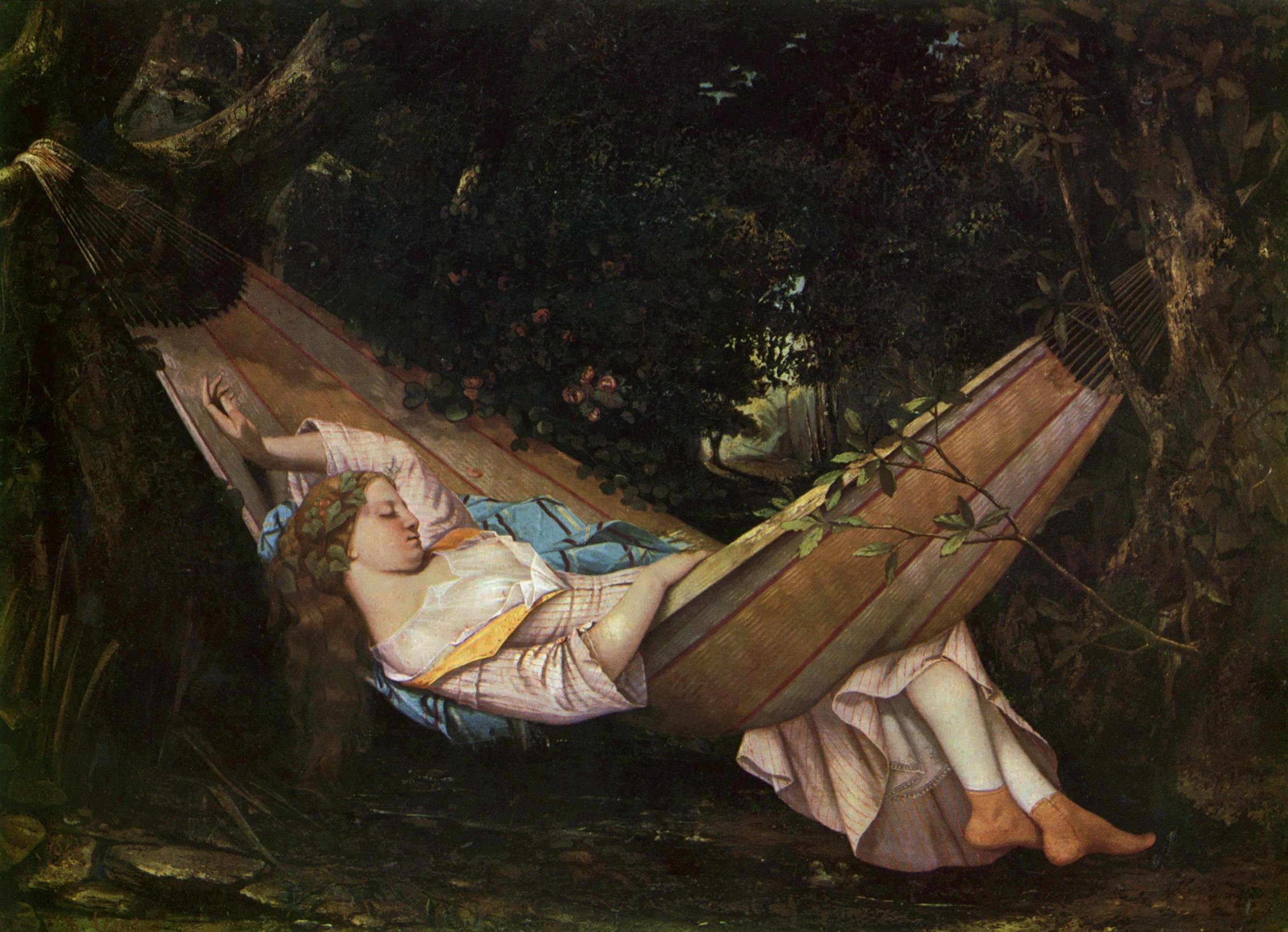
The Hammock, 1844, Gustave Courbet (1819–1877)

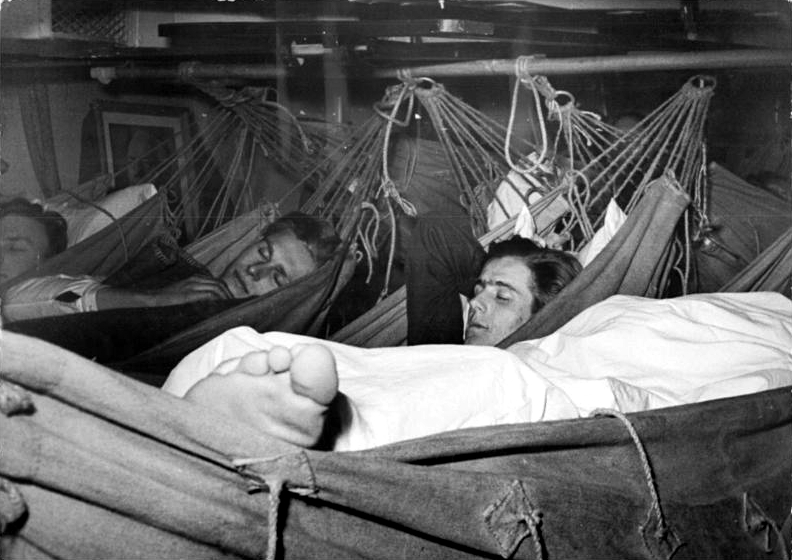
East German school ship crew in their hammocks, 1951

Around 1590, hammocks were adopted for use in sailing ships; the Royal Navy formally adopted the sling hammock in 1597 when it ordered three hundred bolts of canvas for "hanging cabbons or beddes". Aboard ship, hammocks were regularly employed for sailors sleeping on the gun decks of warships, where limited space prevented the installation of permanent bunks. Since a slung hammock moves in concert with the motion of the vessel, the occupant is not at a risk of being thrown onto the deck (which may be 5 or 6 feet below) during swells or rough seas. Likewise, a hammock provides more comfortable sleep than a bunk or a berth while at sea since the sleeper always stays well balanced, irrespective of the motion of the vessel. Prior to the adoption of naval hammocks, sailors would often be injured or even killed as they fell off their berths or rolled on the decks on heavy seas. The sides of traditional canvas naval hammocks wrap around the sleeper like a cocoon, making an inadvertent fall virtually impossible. If suitably packed, they could also be used as emergency flotation devices. Many sailors in the Royal Navy, during the 1590s at least, used a spreader – a length of wood with a V cut in each end to engage the second hammock string on each side. The first string was set up more tightly than the others so that it raised a protective lip along each side to keep out drafts and prevent the sleeper being thrown out. A narrow mattress was also issued which protected the user from cold from below. In addition naval hammocks could be rolled tightly and stowed in an out of the way place or in nets along the gunwale as additional protection during battle (as was the case during the Age of Sail). Many sailors became so accustomed to this way of sleeping that they brought their hammocks ashore with them on leave. The naval use of hammocks continued into the 20th century. During World War II, troopships sometimes employed hammocks for both naval ratings and soldiers in order to increase available space and troop carrying capacity. Many leisure sailors even today prefer hammocks over bunks because of better comfort in sleep while on the high seas.

Hammocks have also been employed on spacecraft in order to utilize available space when not sleeping or resting. During the Apollo program, from Apollo 12 onwards, the Lunar Module was equipped with hammocks for the commander and lunar module pilot to sleep in between moonwalks.

=== Mexican and Maya hammocks ===
Hand weaving, Yucatán, Mexico

In Mexico, hammocks are made in villages surrounding the capital city of the Yucatán, Mérida, and are sold throughout the world as well as locally. Most accounts hold that they were not part of Classic era Maya civilization; they were said to have arrived in the Yucatán from the Caribbean fewer than two centuries before the Spanish conquest. In addition to bark and sisal, hammocks were constructed from various materials, including palm fronds. Quality of native and modern hammocks depends greatly on the quality of the material, thread, and the number of threads used. Mayan hammocks are made on a loom and are hand woven by men, women and children. Hammocks are so symbolically and culturally important for the Yucatecans that even the most humble of homes have hammock hooks in the walls.

=== El Salvador ===
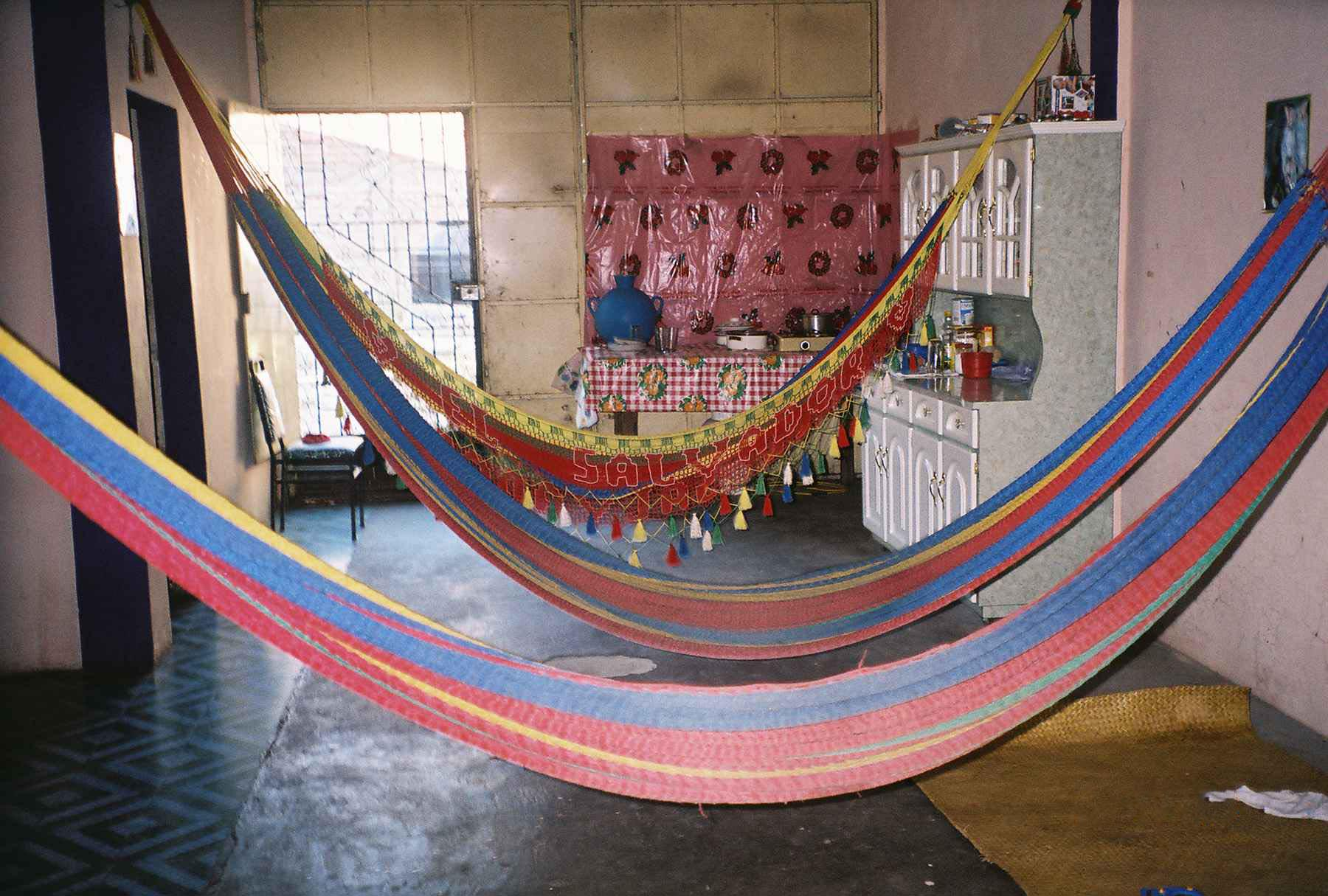
Three Salvadoran synthetic-thread hammocks (hamacas) strung inside a living room in Morazán Department, El Salvador.

El Salvador is a large producer and exporter of hammocks. The valley in which San Salvador City sits is dubbed "The Valley of the Hammocks" because the Native Americans used hammocks to "repel" constant earthquakes. Later, the colonizing Spaniards used the term as an allusion to earthquakes constantly rocking the valley like a hammock. Hammocks are a big part of Salvadoran culture and are often used for afternoon naps. It is completely socially acceptable to lie in a hammock all day in this Central American country. Hammocks swing from doorways, inside living rooms, on porches, in outdoor courtyards, and from trees, in all social classes of Salvadoran homes from the most humble rural home to the most prestigious city hotel chains. In rural El Salvador, a family home may have multiple hammocks strung across the main room, for use as seating, as beds, or as sleep-swings for infants. The municipality of "Concepcion Quezaltepeque" celebrates its traditional Hammocks Festival, where artisans produce and sell hammocks, every year between the first and second weekend of November.

=== Venezuelan ===
In Venezuela entire villages raised their families in hammocks. During the first part of the 20th century, many scientists, adventurers, geologists and other non-native visitors to Central and South American jungles soon adopted the Venezuelan hammock design, which gave protection against scorpions and venomous snakes such as the fer de lance. The difficult jungle environments of South America encountered by Western explorers soon stimulated further development of the Venezuelan hammock for use in other tropical environments.

The Venezuelan hammock's panels were always made of breathable material, necessary to prevent the onset of fungal infections caused by constant rain and high humidity. Fine-woven sandfly netting was eventually added to provide more complete protection from mosquitoes, flies, and crawling insects, especially in regions notorious for malaria or screwworm infestations. A waterproof top sheet or rainfly could be added to protect the occupant from drenching by heavy nighttime rains, along with drip strings—short pieces of string tied to suspension lines—to prevent rainwater running from the tree trunk down the hammock cords to the hammock itself. A breathable false cotton (later nylon) bottom panel was frequently added to these jungle hammocks, allowing air to pass through while still preventing mosquito stings to the occupant.

=== Jungle hammock ===
The Venezuelan hammock, as modified, eventually became known as a jungle hammock. Simply by wetting the hammock suspension ropes with insecticides or insect repellent, the jungle hammock even gave protection against crawling insects with mandibles that could bite holes through the insect netting.

The United States Army eventually adopted their own version of the jungle hammock, complete with rainproof fly and sandfly netting for use by U.S. and Allied forces in tropical jungle regions such as Burma during World War II. While at first reluctant to accept the idea of its men sleeping in hammocks, the United States Marine Corps later employed jungle hammocks in New Britain and later Pacific island campaigns where heavy rain and insects were prevalent; concerns over injuries from machine gun and artillery fire were overcome by first digging a slit trench, then staking the hammock's support lines to suspend the hammock beneath ground level.

Later U.S. Army hammocks issued during the Vietnam War, such as the M1966 Jungle Hammock, were mistakenly fitted with waterproof bottom panels, which often became filled with water overnight. On the other side, North Vietnamese Army (NVA) and Viet Cong (VC) forces regularly employed jungle hammocks fabricated from scavenged or captured US parachute cloth and shroud lines. Hung well off jungle trails, the hammocks kept down the incidence of disease and illness, which NVA commanders generally regarded as a greater threat than shrapnel injuries caused by sleeping above ground.

After the Vietnam War, the use of hammocks has become popular in Vietnam among the civilians, as the civilians learned how to make hammocks and sleep in them from the American soldiers. Many used parachutes were recycled into hammocks, and also local styles have emerged.

=== Indian ===
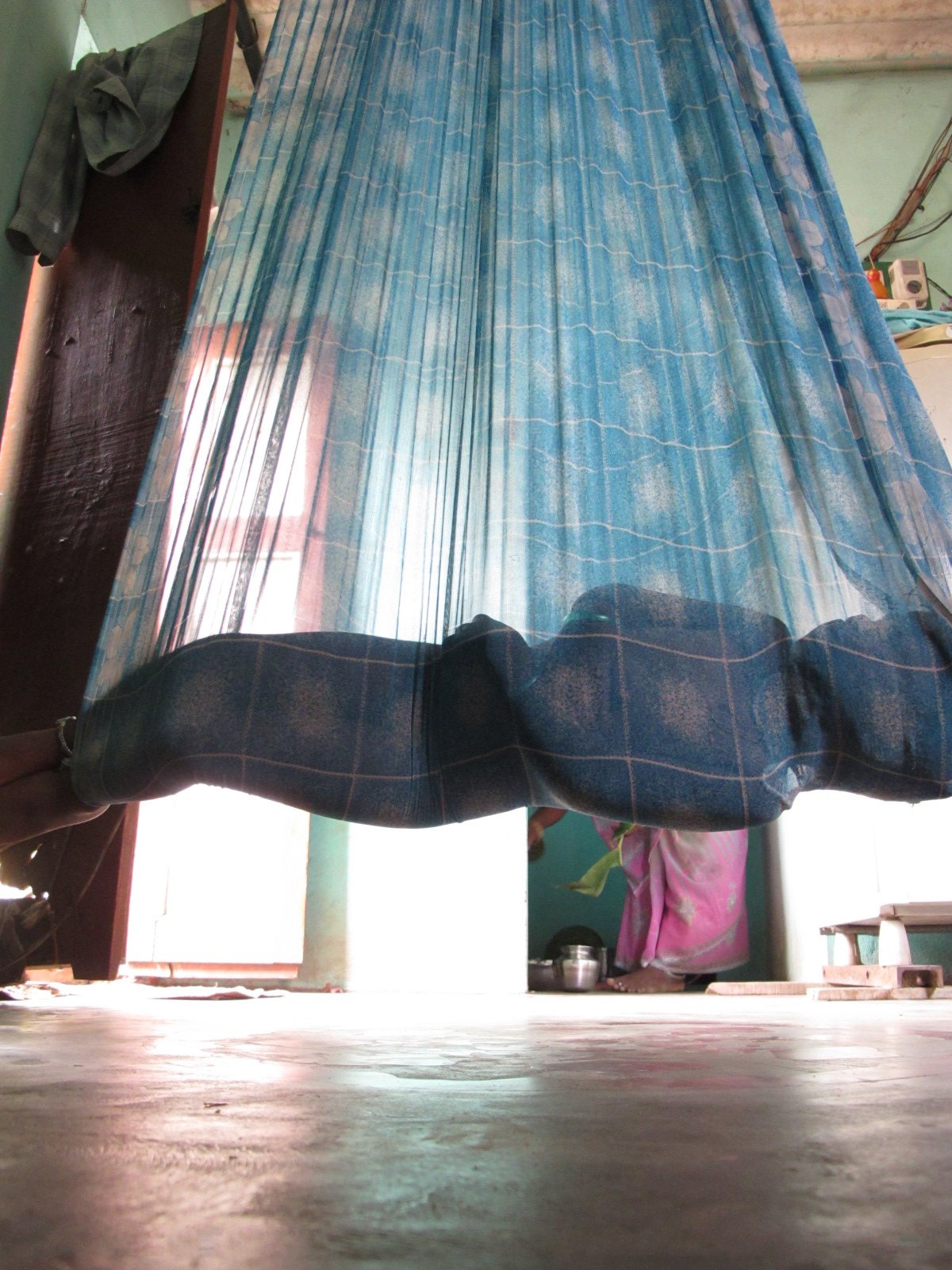
Baby Sari-hammock in Tamil Nadu, India

Ceiling mounted hammocks for babies are traditional to south India. The textile used is the woven 5 meter Sari, which is long enough to be hung high, yet reach low enough to be safe for toddlers. The light material allows perspiration and cooling in the hot climate native to this region.

=== Lunar crewed missions ===
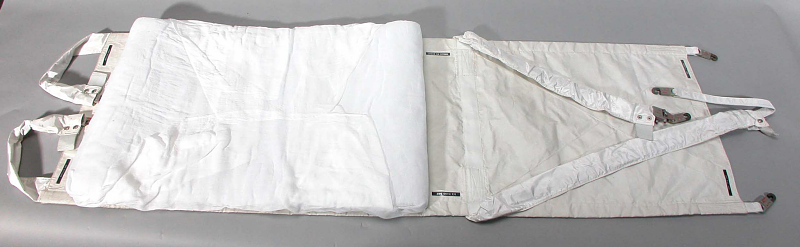
Unflown hammock of the Apollo lunar module at the National Air and Space Museum

The first two men to walk on the Moon, Apollo 11 astronauts Neil Armstrong and Buzz Aldrin, spent their rest periods on the Apollo lunar module floor and reported being too cold to sleep comfortably.

From the mission Apollo 12 until the last Apollo lunar mission, hammocks designed to attach to the interior of the lunar module ascent stage were provided. They helped reduce the cooling effects of contact with the cabin floor as well as a softer support. They enabled astronauts from the last missions to spend complete nights of sleep on the Moon.

== Current ==
=== Usage ===
There are currently a wide variety of hammocks available. There are hammocks that are designed specifically for backpacking and include mosquito netting along with pockets for nighttime storage. There are hammocks made out of thin and lightweight material which makes them ideal for taking on daytrips. Other hammocks include self-standing metal or wood structures that support the hammock. Given that hammocks are commonly similar lengths to accommodate for an average adult's height, most hammock stands are universal in design, typically featuring a spreader bar that runs along the ground, feet for stability at each end, and a diagonal arm at each end to provide two hanging points.

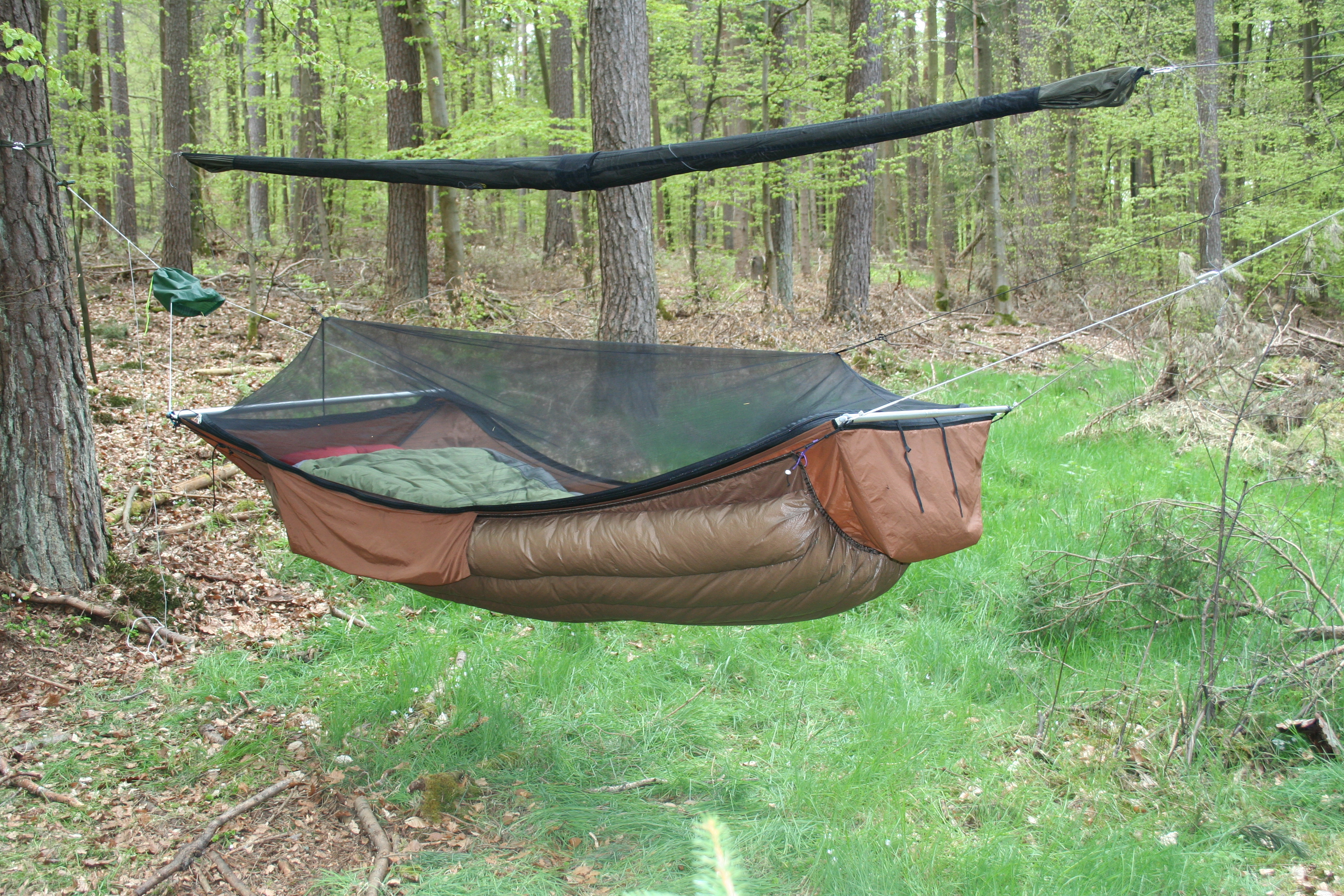
Bridge hammock with bugnet

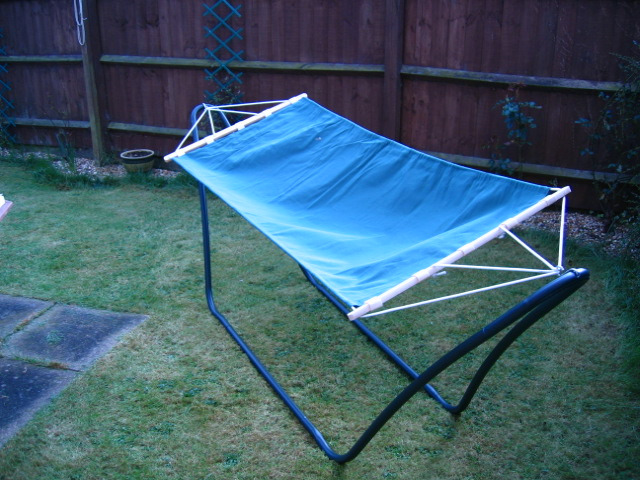
Hammock on a frame in a residential backyard

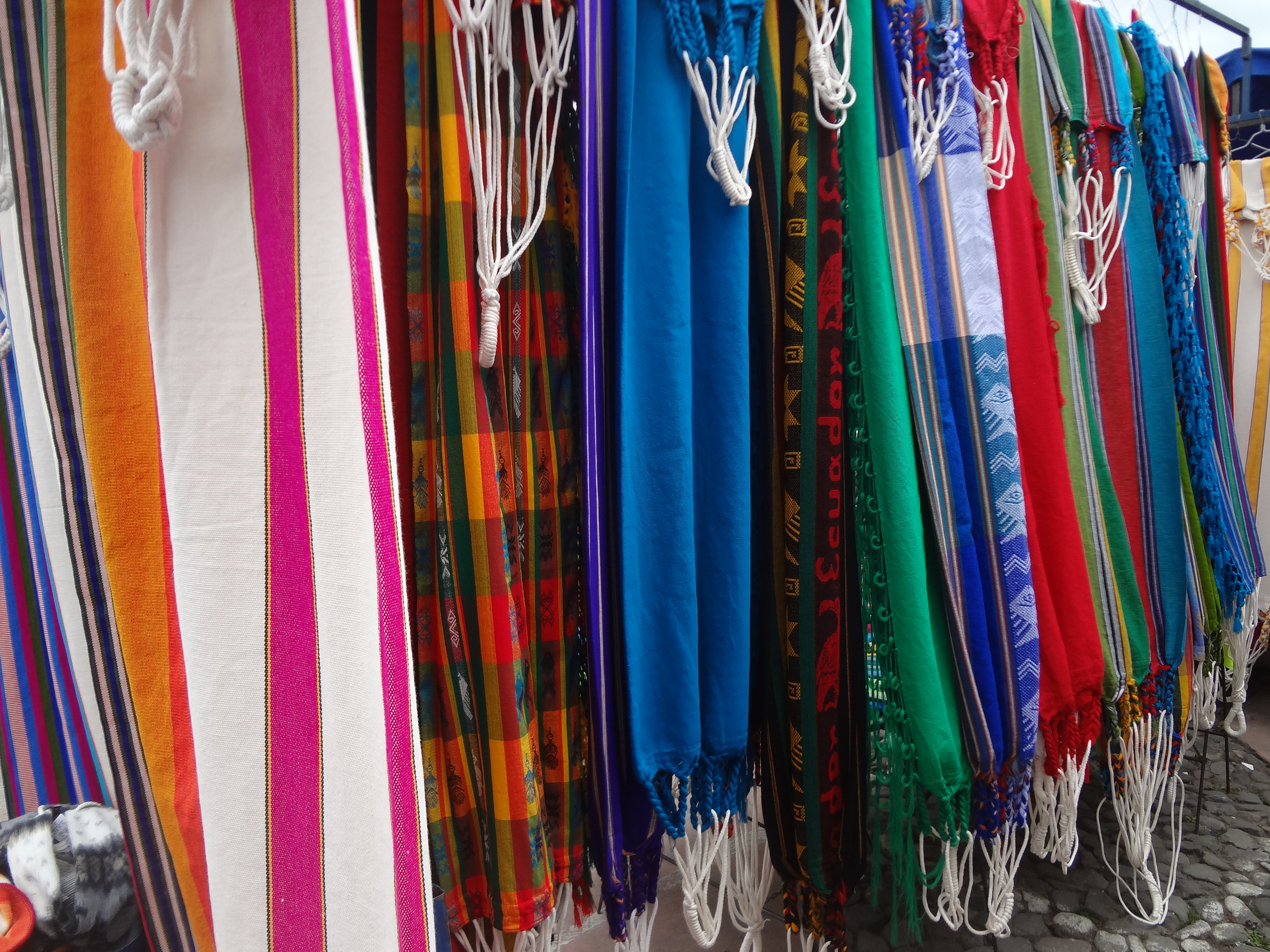
Traditional hammocks,
Otavalo Artisan Market,
Andes Mountains, Ecuador

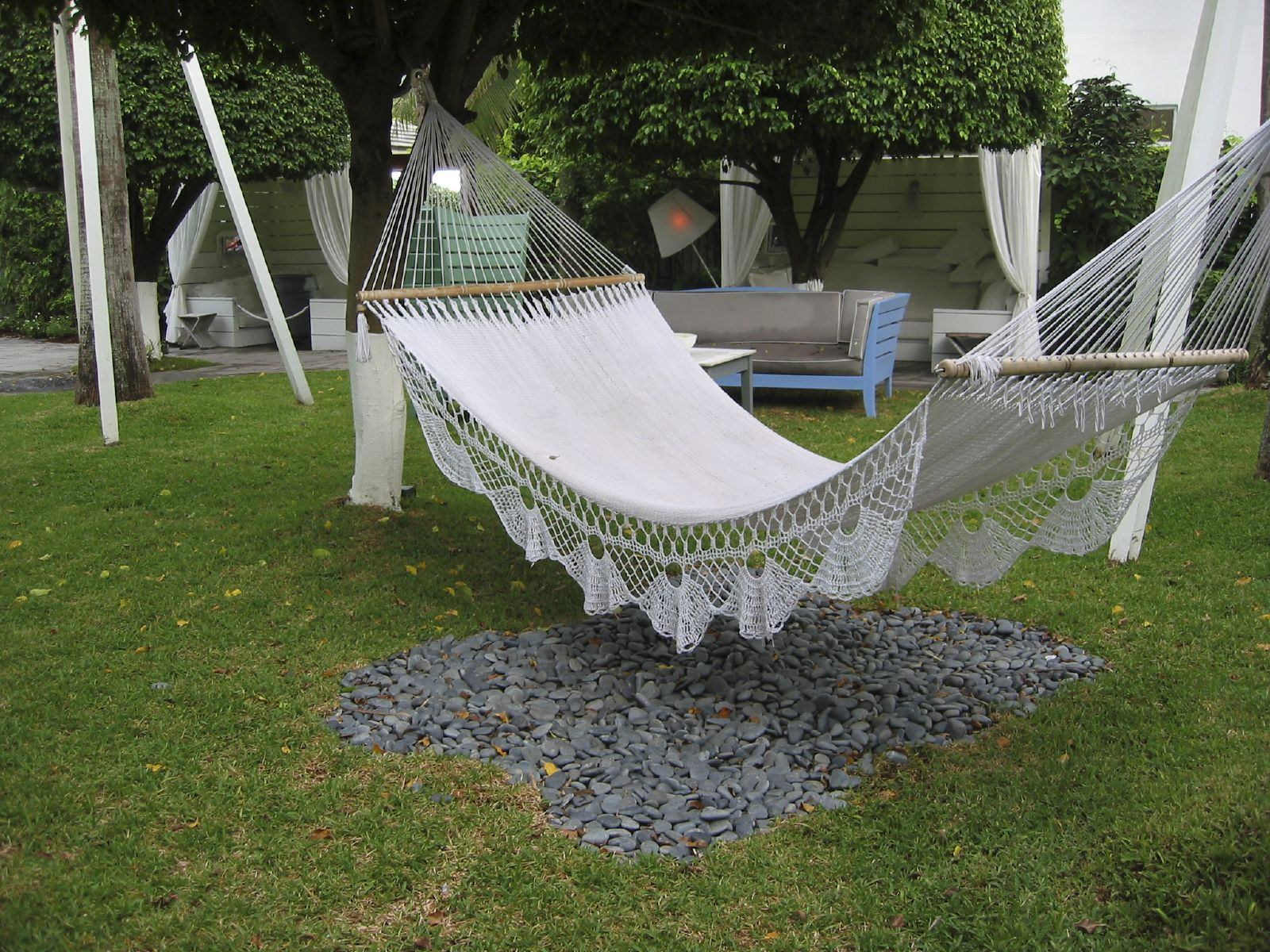
Crocheted hammock

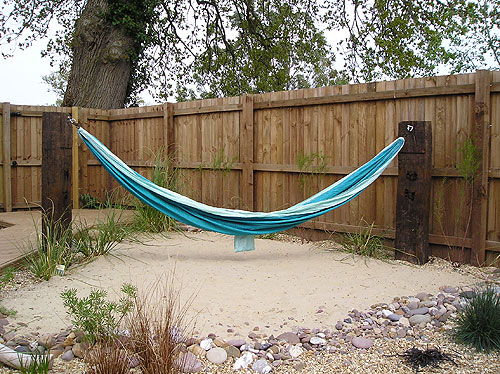
Nylon hammock,
residential backyard

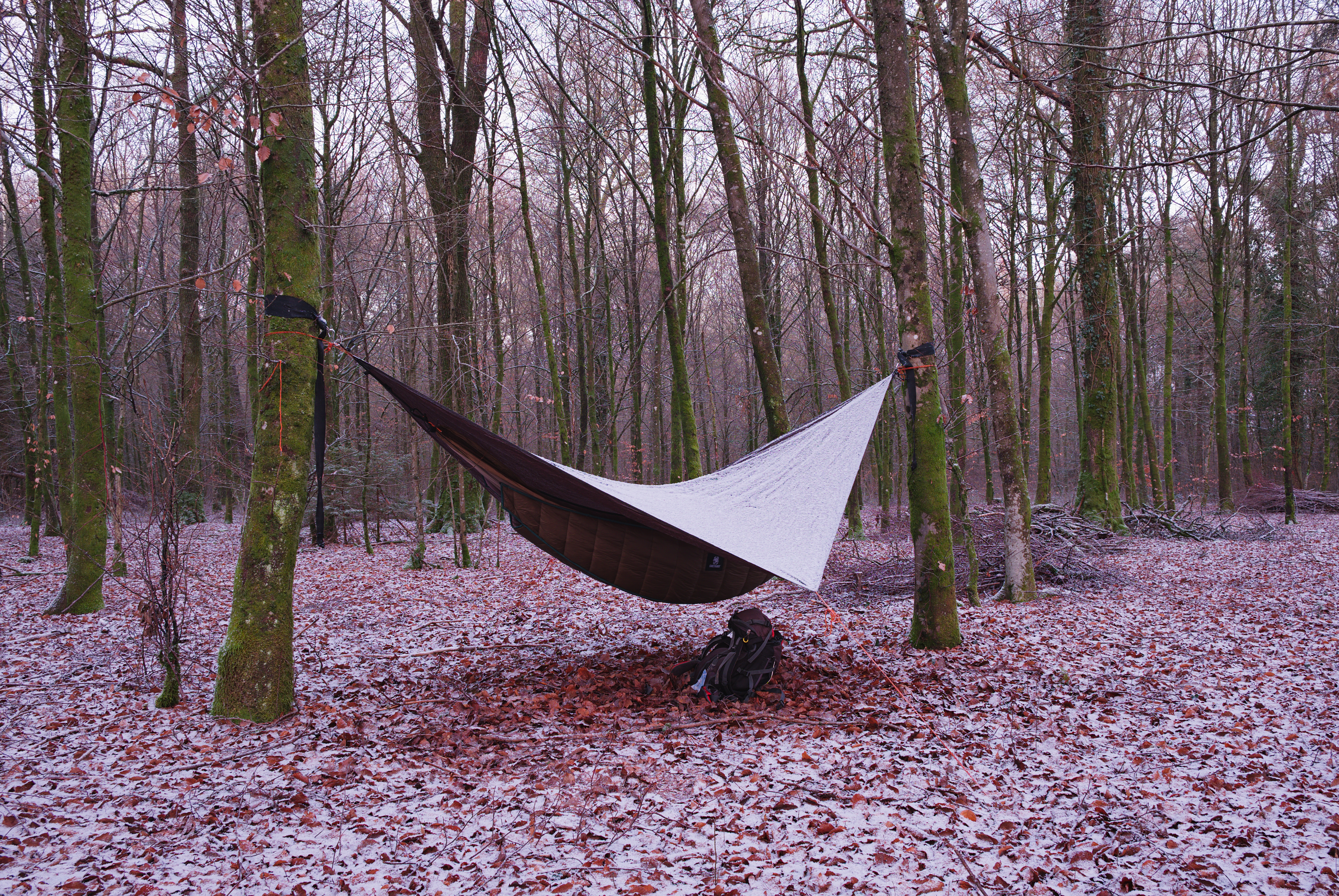
Hammock with tarp and underquilt

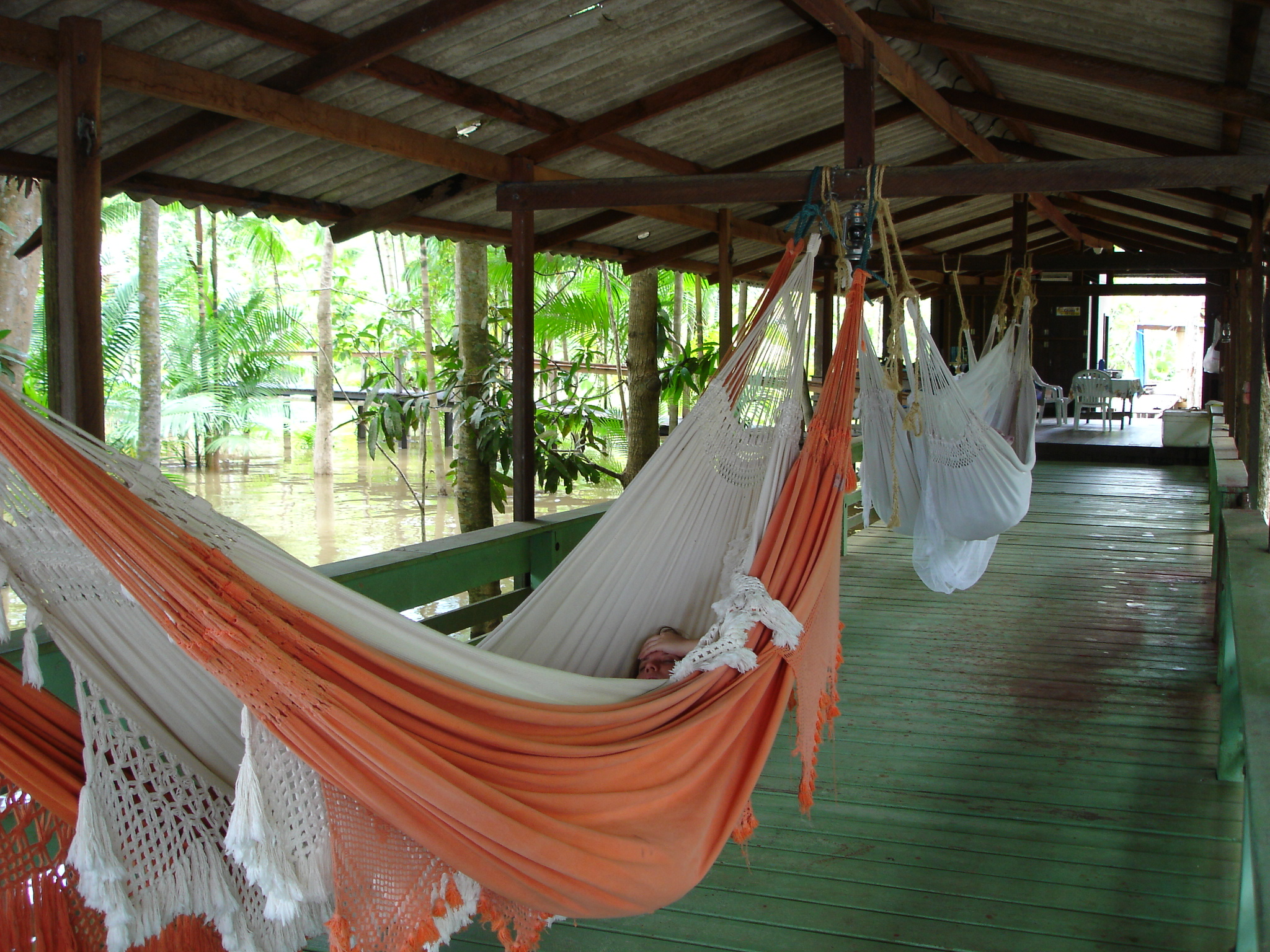
Hammocks,
Amazon River island,
Brazil

Hammocks are very popular in the Brazilian northeast region, but not only as sleeping devices: in the poorest areas of the sertão, if there is not a cemetery in a settlement, hammocks may be used to carry the dead to a locale where there is one; also, they frequently serve as a low-cost alternative to coffins. This custom inspired Candido Portinari's 1944 painting Enterro na Rede ("burial in the hammock"). Traditionally the sailors who have died at sea were buried at sea in their hammocks.

Medical research suggests the gentle rocking motion of the hammock allows users to fall asleep faster and sleep more deeply compared to a traditional, stationary mattress.

=== Styles ===
Current popular hammock styles include the spreader-bar, Mayan, Brazilian, naval, Nicaraguan, Venezuelan (jungle), and travel hammocks. Each style is distinctive and has its own set of advantages and disadvantages. Many hammocks come in a variety of colors, patterns, and sizes ranging from a one-person (250–350 lbs / 110–160 kg) to two or three person (400–600 lbs / 180–270 kg). Common dimensions for unslung hammocks fall in a range between 3'/0.9m to 14'/4.2m across and 6'/1.8m to 11'/3.3m long.

The spreader-bar hammock is easily recognized by wooden or metal bars at the head and foot of the hammock, spreading its width and allowing for easy access for casual use, such as in a backyard. Unfortunately, the spreader bars also make the hammock unsteady since the metacenter of the hammock when sleeping is very high. This style is generally considered less stable and less comfortable for sleeping than other styles. A subset of this style is the single-spreader bar hammock, which uses a spreader bar on only one end and is much more stable. A variation of the single-spreader bar hammock has three attachment points, one at each corner of the spreader bar and one at the non-spreader bar end, and is nearly untippable.

While the various styles of hammocks available today are similar in form, they differ significantly in materials, purpose, and construction.

Mayan and Nicaraguan hammocks are made from either cotton or nylon string that is woven to form a supportive net. Mayan Hammocks have a looser weave than Nicaraguan hammocks, and the supportiveness of the hammock "bed" depends on the number of strings and quality of the weave.

Brazilian hammocks are made from cotton fabric and usually more durable than the string varieties. While Mayan and Nicaraguan hammocks are considered by some to have the potential to be more comfortable, the Brazilian hammock's comfort is less dependent on its construction and therefore less likely to vary as highly from manufacturer to manufacturer.

Naval hammocks are usually made from canvas or strong cotton. They are intended to be durable and stand well the hardships of shipboard use. They usually are simple and undecorated but robust. Venezuelan or jungle hammocks made today are generally of breathable nylon or polyester, and use dacron or similar non-stretch suspension lines. They are "inline" hammocks; like the canvas naval hammocks of old, the occupant sleeps along the length of the hammock, rather than across it. With their breathable false bottoms, drip strings, sandfly netting, and optional rainfly, they are one of the most secure hammocks against not only water entry, but also insect stings or bites.

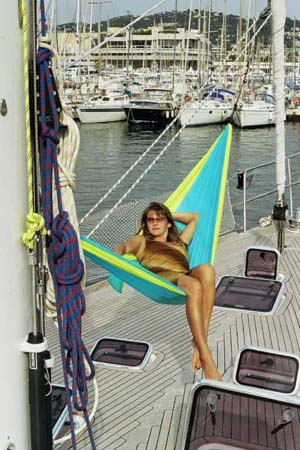
Relaxing on a yacht in a nylon hammock. This shows use with a diagonal positioning of the body.

Travel or camping hammocks are popular among leave no trace and ultra-light campers, hikers, and sailing enthusiasts for their reduced impact on the environment and their lightness and lack of bulk compared to tents. They are typically made of sturdy nylon parachute fabric which may use ripstop techniques to improve durability. Some hammocks feature a mosquito net and storage pockets. Some types offer a ridgeline to make set up easier, and may also include a slit for entry through the bottom of the hammock. Special webbing straps (called "treehuggers") are used to loop around trees in order to create attachment points for the hammock.

=== Set-up and use ===
For non-spreader-bar styles, the way they are hung is critical for comfort. Generally, a higher attachment point is preferred as well as sufficient length between points, though these two dimensions can be adjusted to compensate for a lack in one or the other. The optimal angle of the attaching lines to the post / wall / tree is usually about 30 degrees. Hammocks can be attached to the anchor points using a variety of suspension systems, including ropes and webbing straps.

Though one can lie in a hammock lengthwise or across its width, most hammocks are best used with a diagonal position, as it provides the most room and support. Users with back and joint pains often report some relief from these problems when sleeping in a hammock in this manner.

== Gallery ==
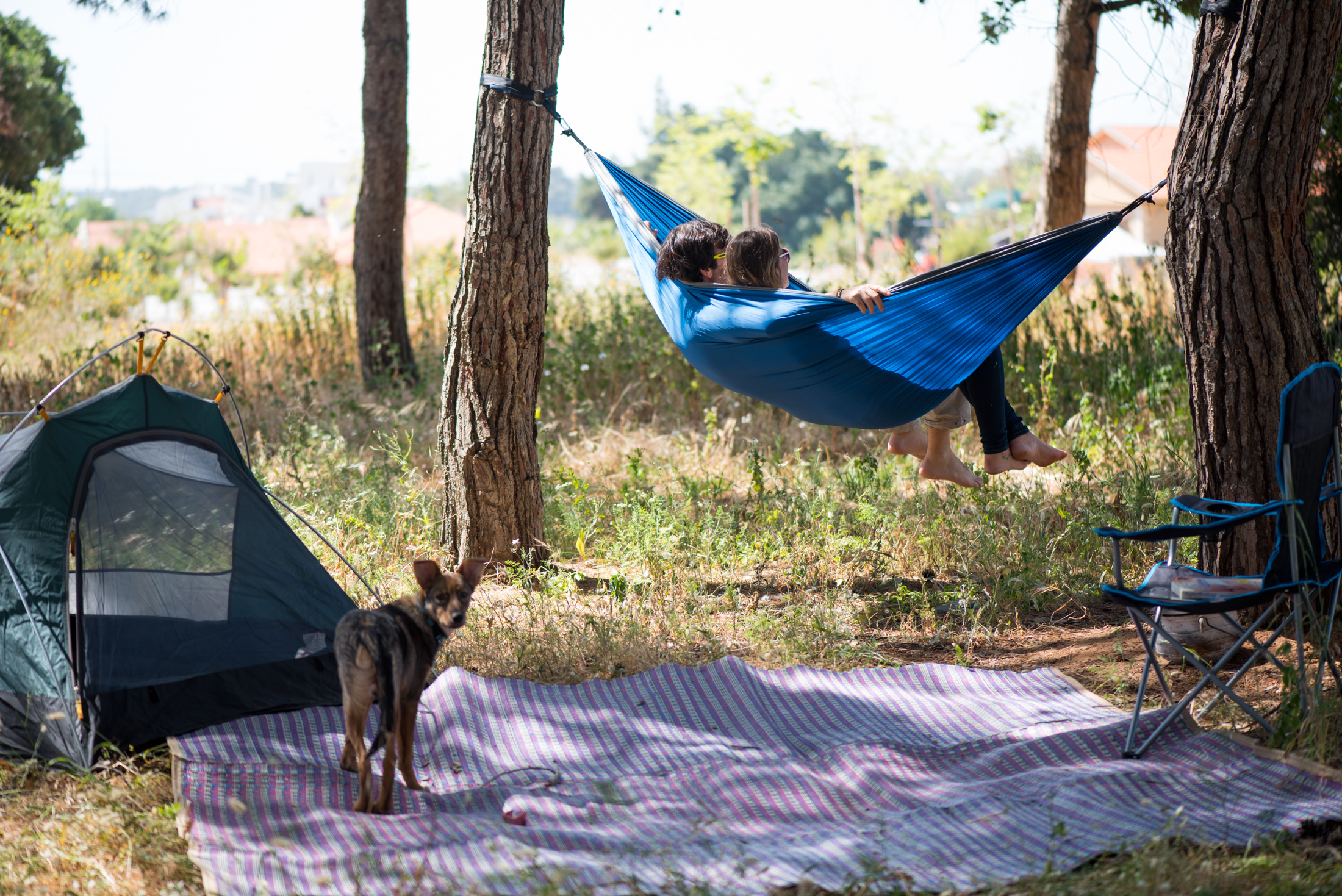
Nylon ripstop
camping hammock

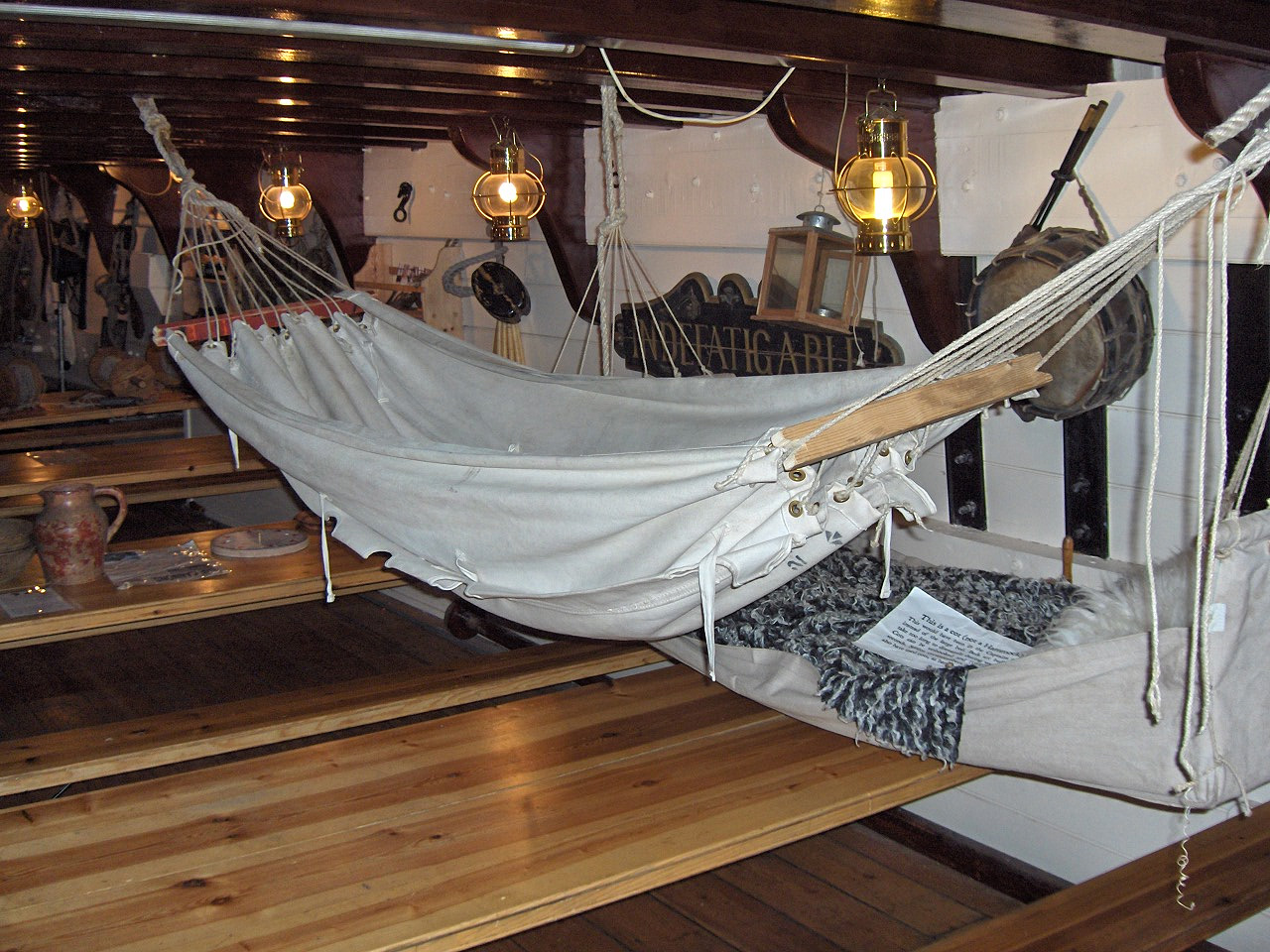
Hammock aboard the Grand Turk

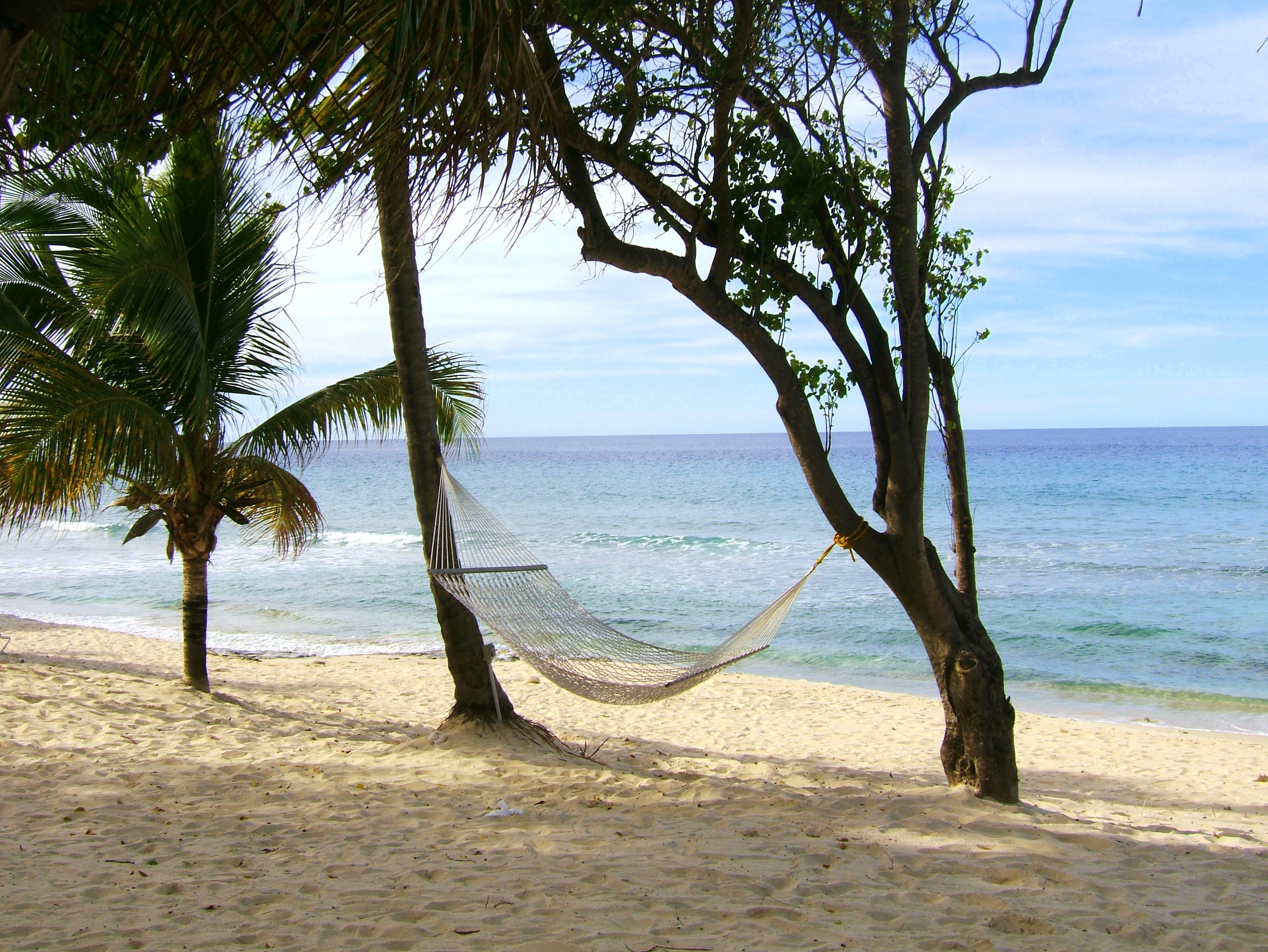
Hammock on a tropical beach

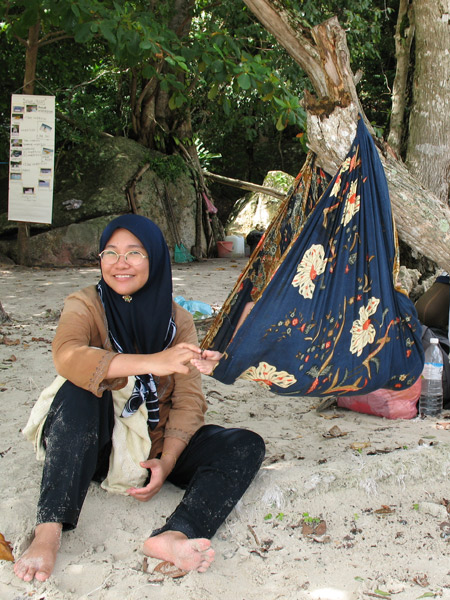
Baby hammock, Pangkor

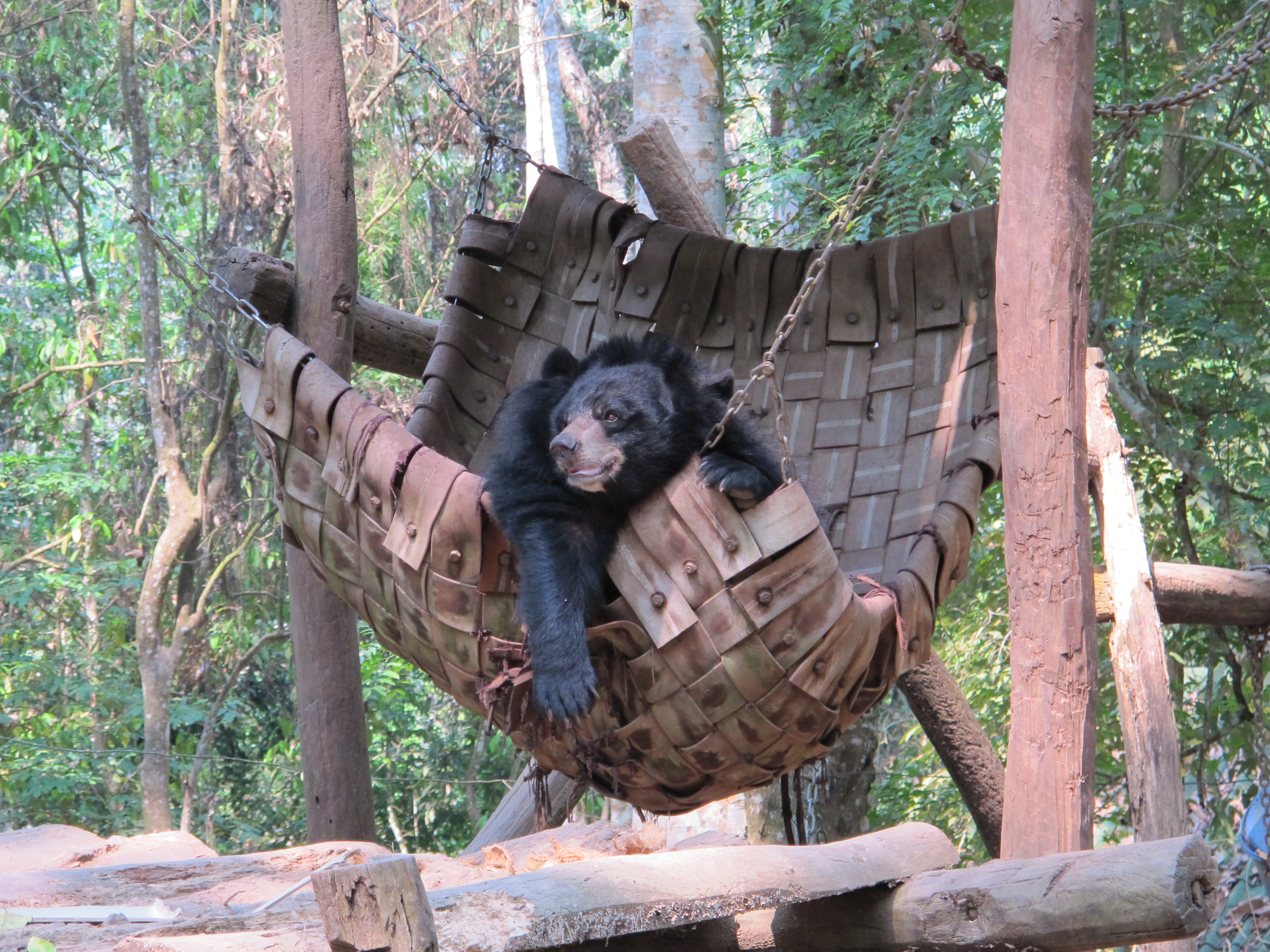
Bear in a hammock
Kuangsi sanctuary, Laos

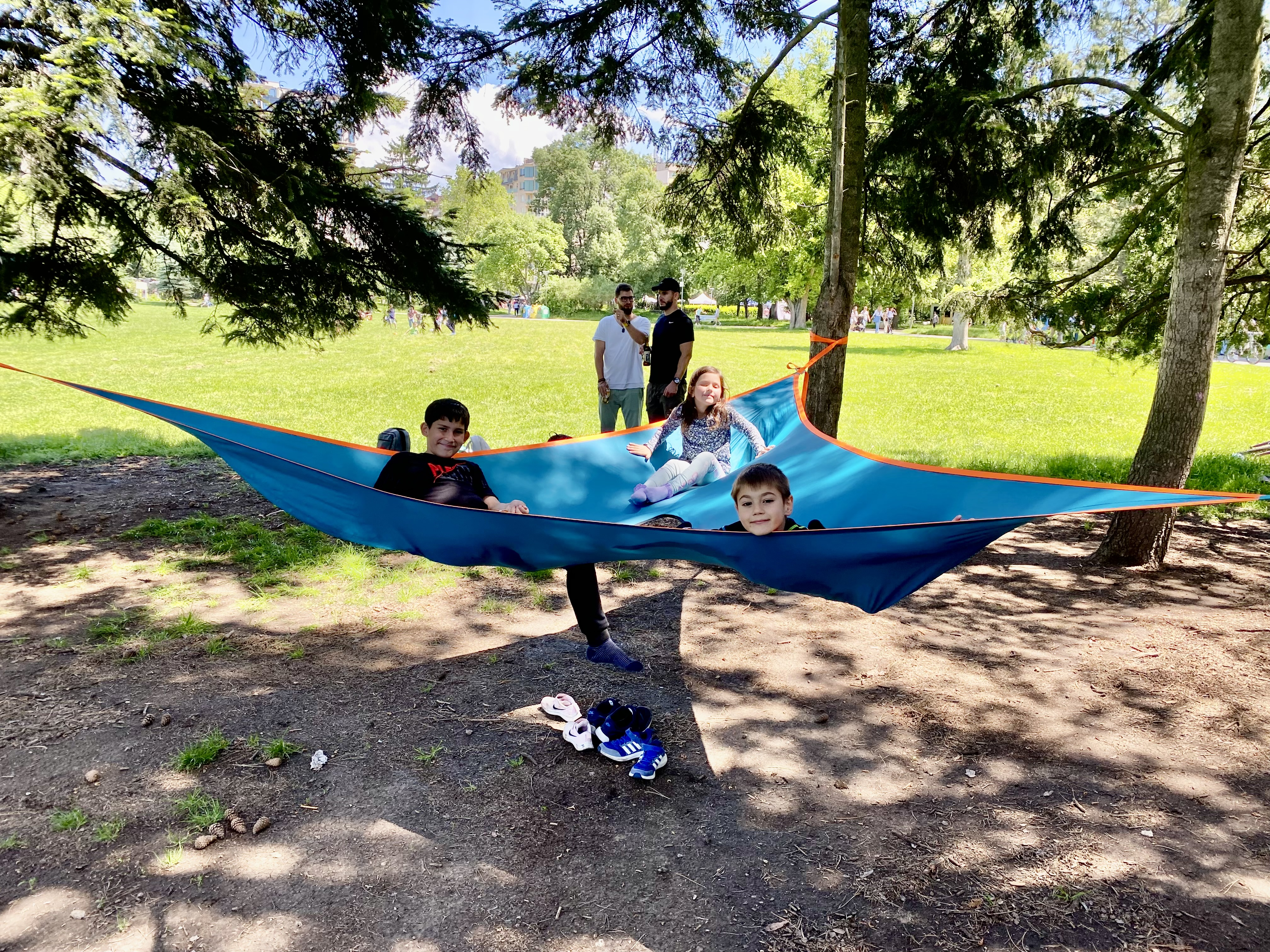
Triple hammock

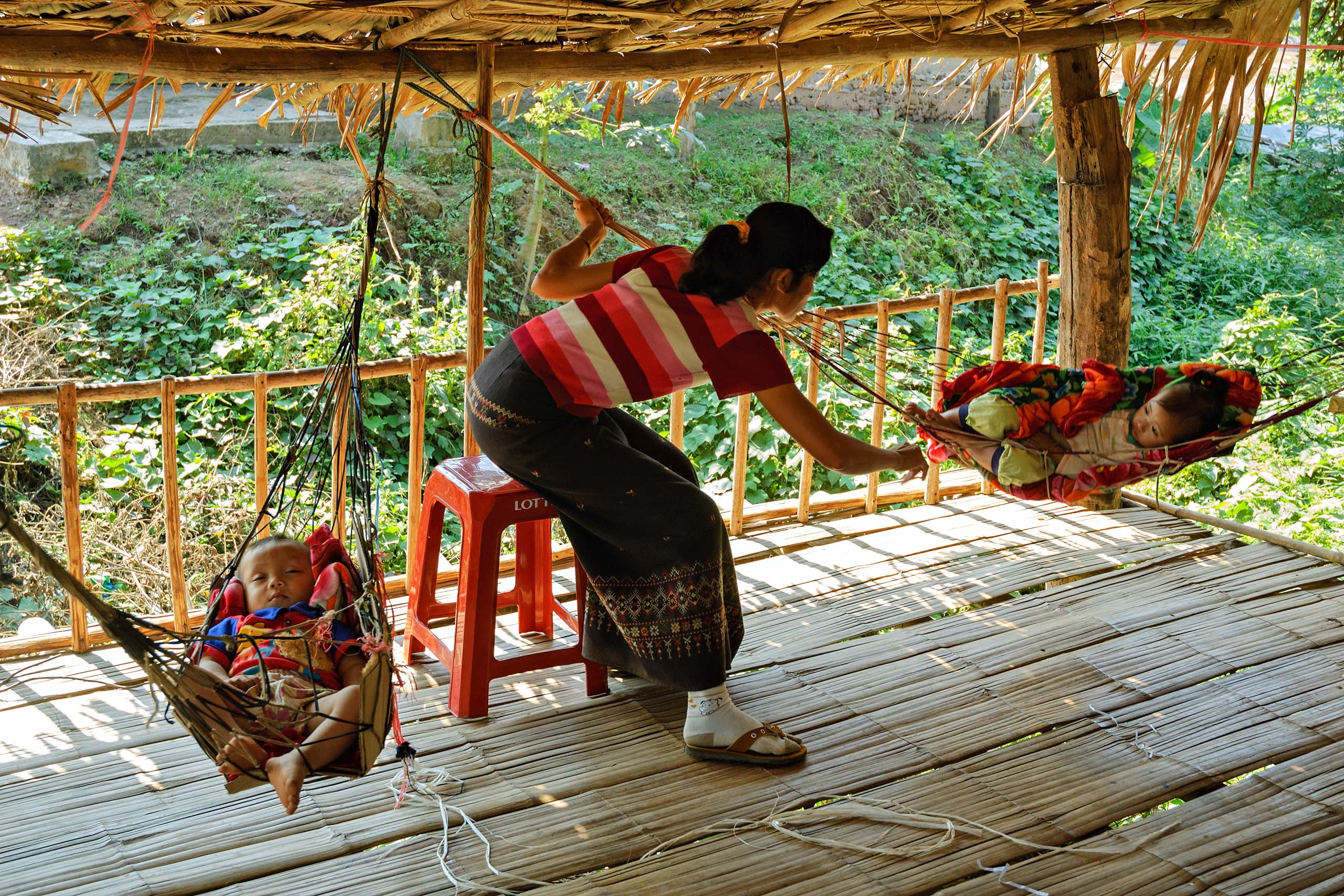
Hammocks with children being rocked by their mother, Northern Laos

== See also ==
- Cresson Kearny
- Hammock camping
- Mothership Space Net Penthouse
- Swing (seat)

== General and cited references ==
- Blomfield, R. Massie (1911), "Hammocks and their Accessories", The Mariner's Mirror, 1 (5): 144–147, doi:10.1080/00253359.1911.10654498
- Sleeswyk, André W. (1990), "The Origin of the Hammock", The Mariner's Mirror, 76 (4): 361–362
- White, Lynn (1970), "The Origins of the Coach", Proceedings of the American Philosophical Society, 114 (6): 423–431
