= Mothership Space Net Penthouse =

Coordinates: 38.6237°N 109.5019°W

The Mothership Space Net Penthouse was an aerial hammock in Moab, Utah, hand-woven from 14,000 feet of cordage and rigged by the Moab Monkeys, a group of over 50 people led by slackliner Andy Lewis, during Thanksgiving 2014.

The net was suspended over 400 feet above the ground, forming a pentagon shape that covered approximately 2,000 square feet, with five lines anchoring it to the surrounding cliffs. Lewis spent several years acquiring the necessary materials to construct the net. Highliners traversed the five legs of the net, which spanned up to 80 meters (262 feet), while BASE jumpers leaped from the human-sized hole at the center of the net. The pentagonal web was positioned more than 200 feet away from the nearest cliff.
