= Tree tent =

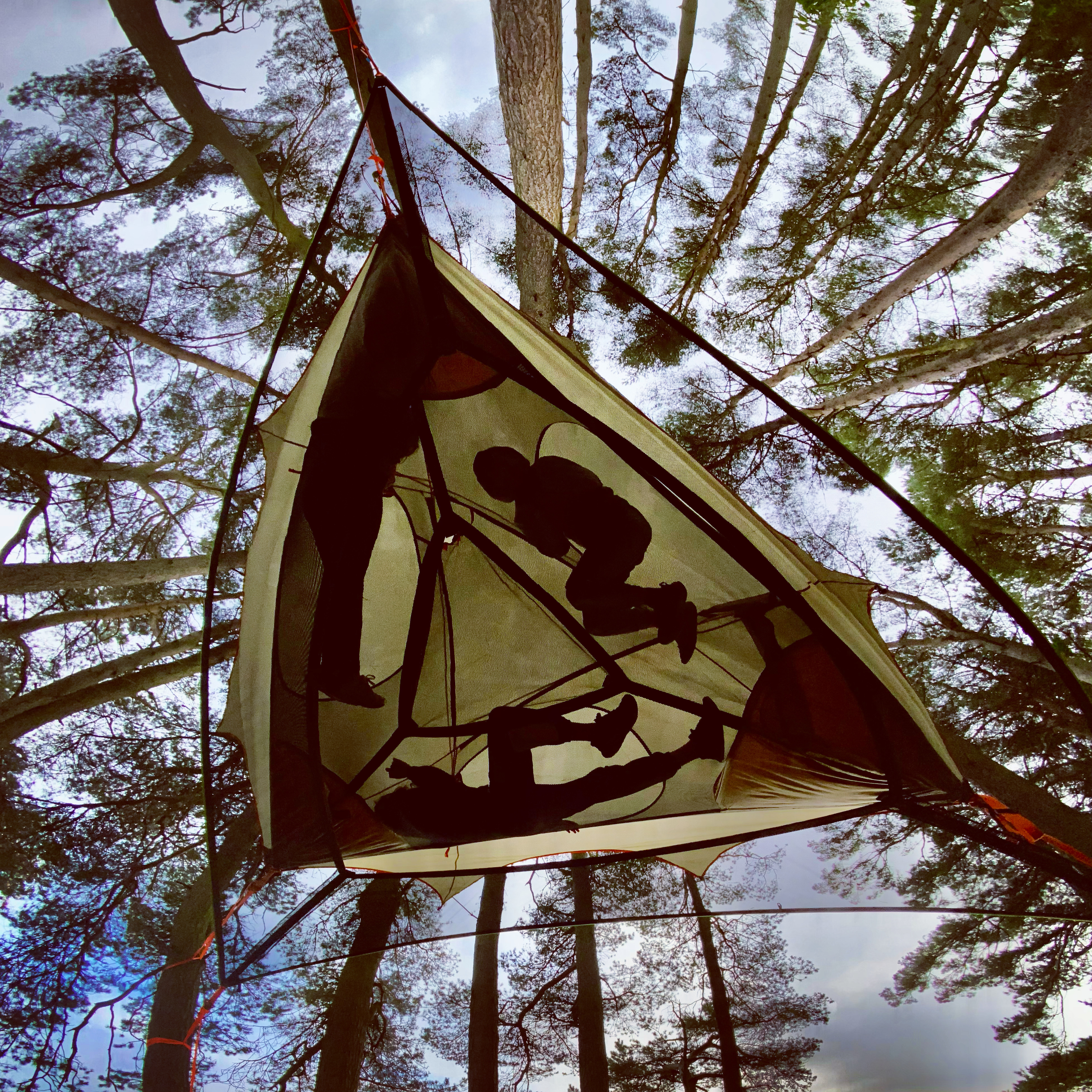
Suspended tree tent with mesh floor by SpiderTents

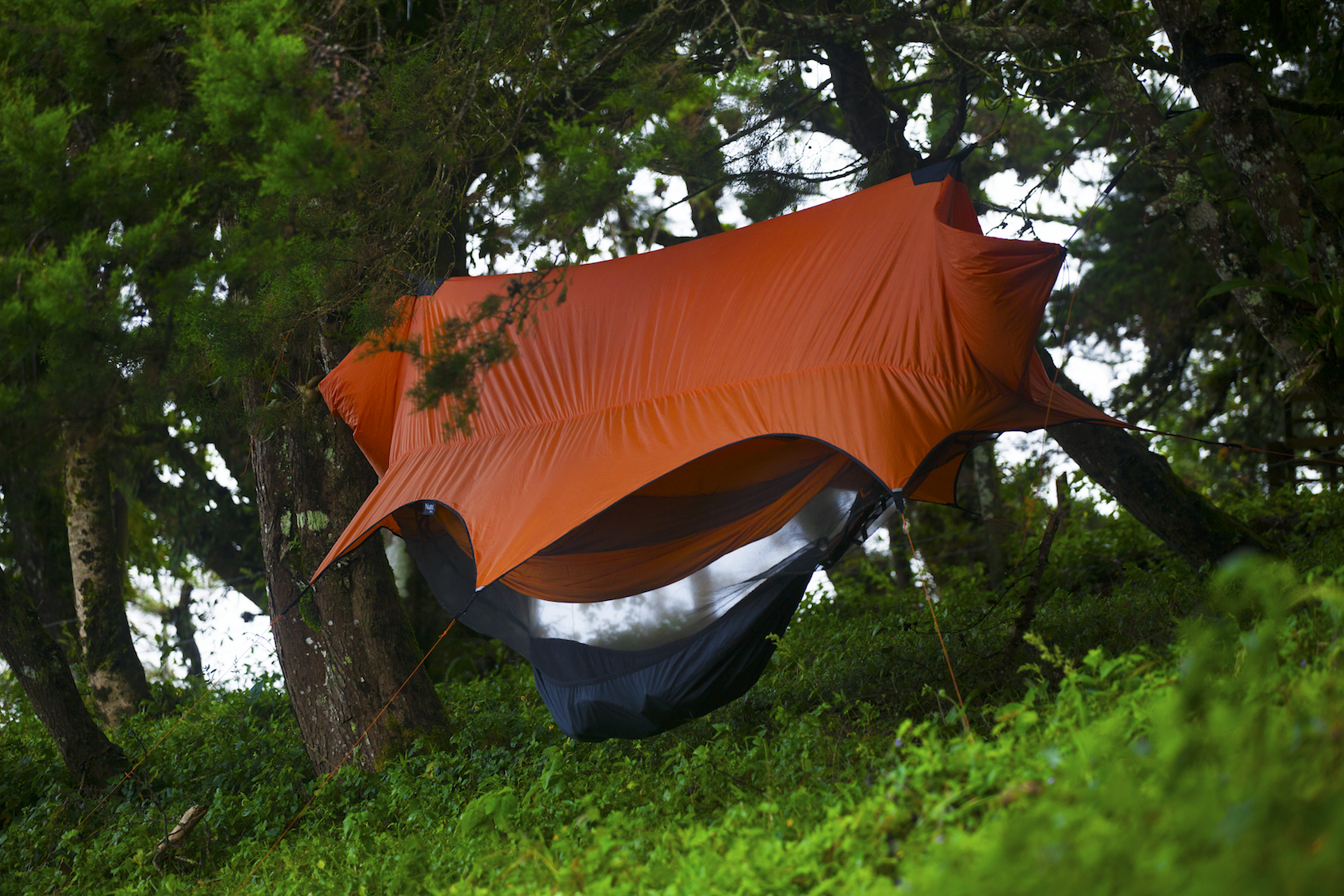
A Nubé Hammock Tent set up with a camping hammock. Space underneath the hammock is used to store supplies out of the elements

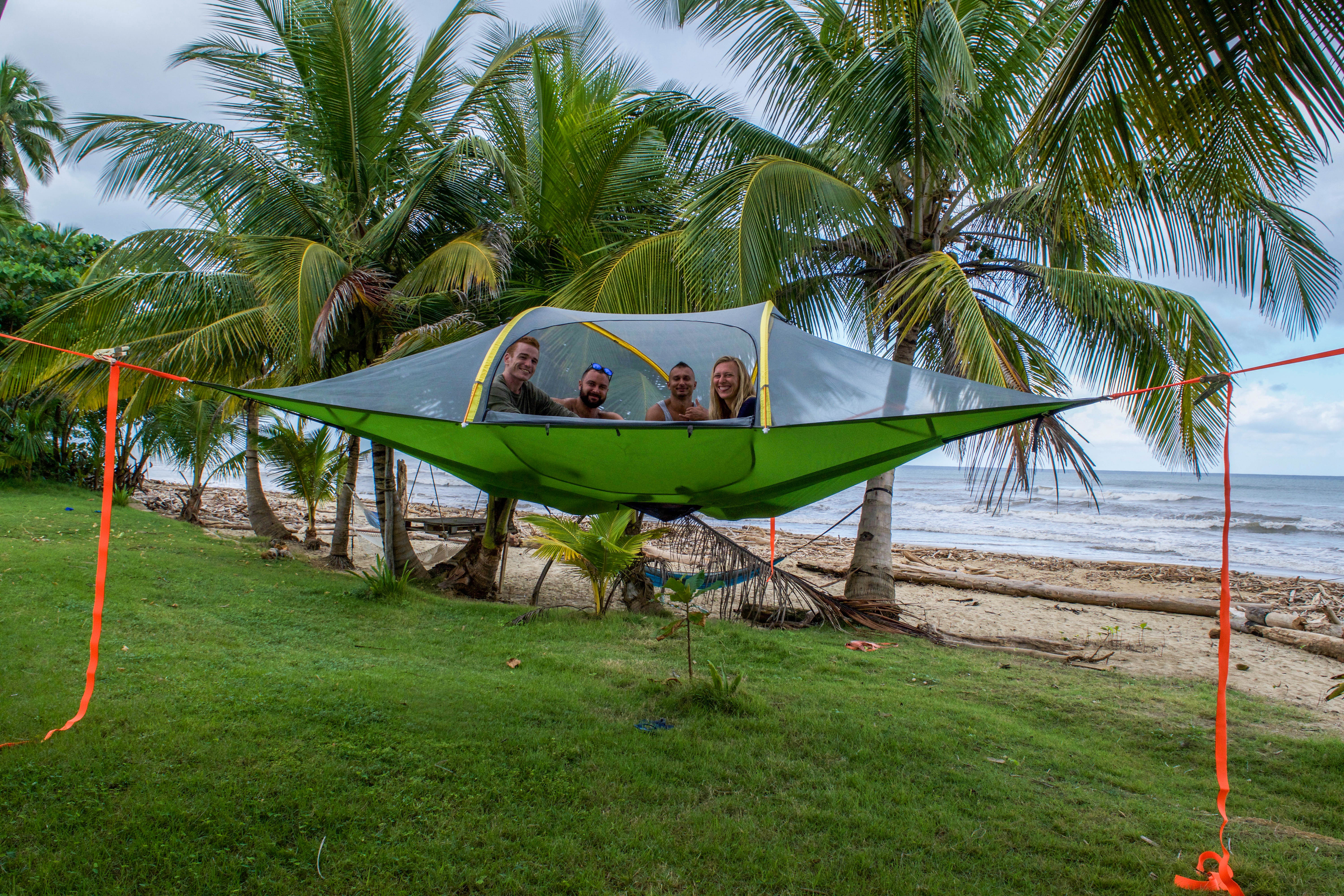
4 people in a tree tent

A tree tent is a camping tent designed to be set above the ground, usually attached to or supported by the neighboring trees. Like a tent, it must be a complete enclosure that can house a camper and their gear while suspended off the ground. Like tree houses, a tree tent may be accessed via a rope ladder and provide a sheltered environment for recreation and various outdoor activities. The portable nature of this type of shelter provides for more versatile location choice than a conventional tree house or a camping tent.

Some tree tents have the capacity to house 6+ people.
