= Hiking =

Walking as a hobby, sport, or leisure activity

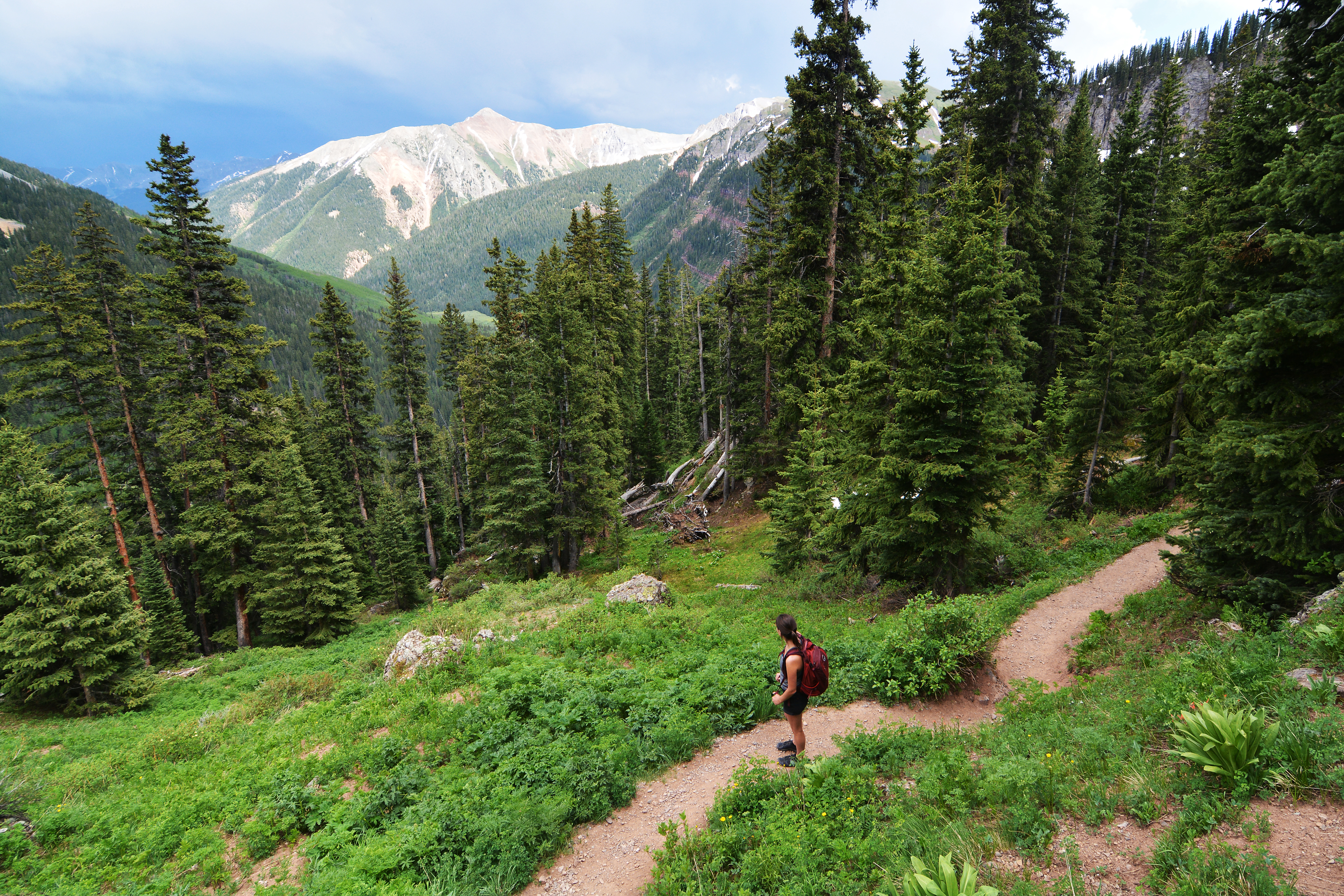
Hiking in the San Juan Mountains, Colorado, United States

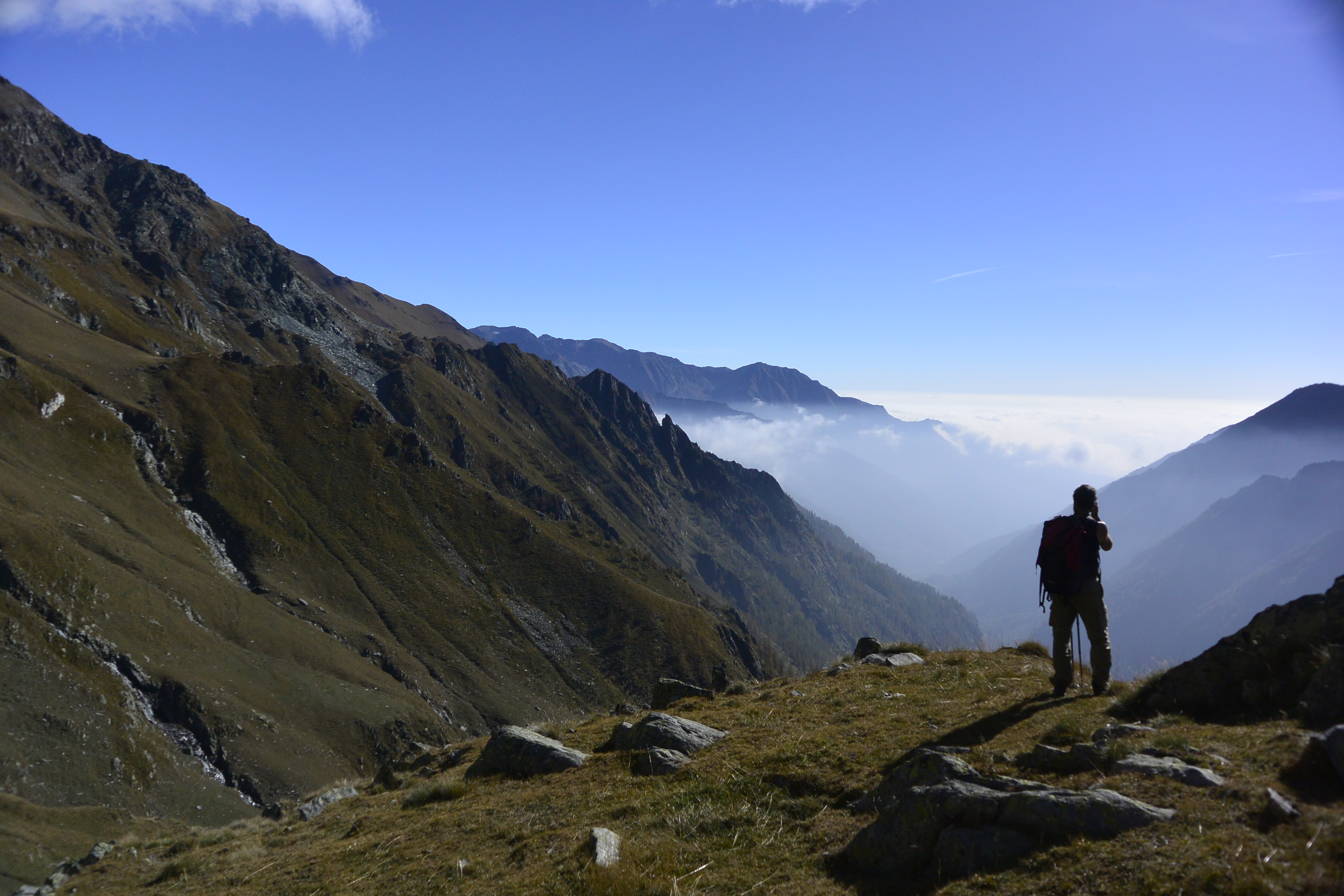
A hiker in the Alps

A hike is a long, vigorous walk, usually on trails or footpaths in the countryside. Walking for pleasure developed in Europe during the eighteenth century. Long hikes as part of a religious pilgrimage have existed for a much longer time. "Hiking" is the preferred term in Canada and the United States; the term "walking" is used in these countries for shorter, particularly urban walks. In the United Kingdom and Ireland, the word "walking" describes all forms of walking, whether it is a walk in a park or backpacking in the Alps. The word hiking is also often used in the UK, along with rambling, hillwalking, and fell walking (a term mostly used for hillwalking in northern England). The term bushwalking is endemic to Australia. In New Zealand a long, vigorous walk or hike is called tramping. It is a common activity with numerous hiking organizations worldwide.

== Related terms ==
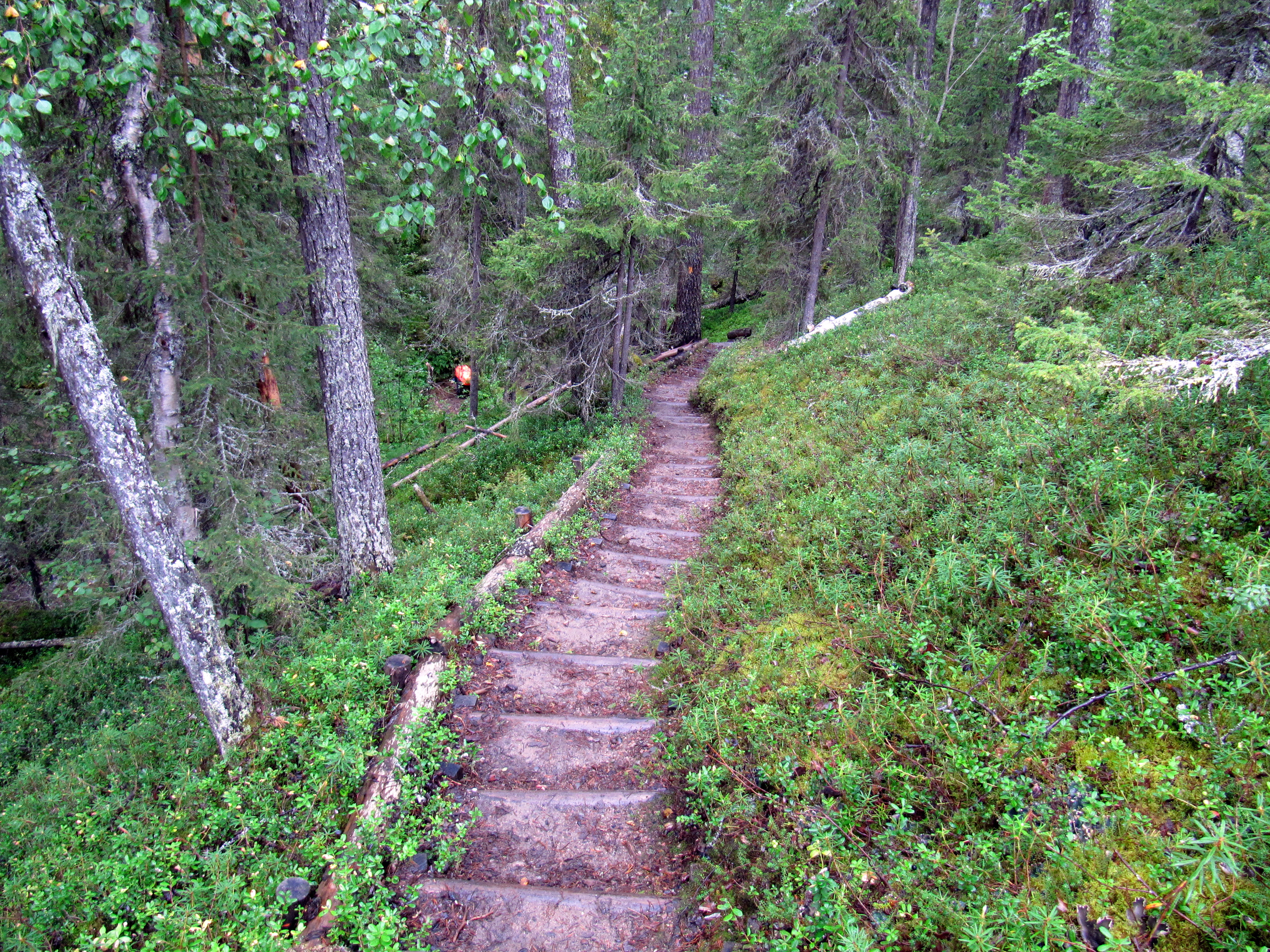
The Karhunkierros ("Bear's Round"), an 80 km (50 mi) long hiking trail through the Oulanka National Park in Kuusamo, Finland

Hiking means walking outdoors on a trail or off-trail for recreational purposes. A "day hike" refers to a hike that can be completed in a single day. In Northern England, including the Lake District and Yorkshire Dales, "fell walking" describes hill or mountain walks, as fell is the common word for both features in these locations.

Hiking sometimes involves bushwhacking and is sometimes referred to as such. This specifically refers to difficult walking through dense forest, undergrowth, or bushes where forward progress requires pushing vegetation aside. In extreme cases of bushwhacking, where the vegetation is so dense that human passage is impeded, a machete is typically used to clear a pathway. The Australian term bushwalking refers to both on and off-trail hiking. Common terms for hiking used by New Zealanders are tramping (particularly for overnight and longer trips), walking or bushwalking. Trekking describes multi-day hiking in mountainous regions. Hiking a long-distance trail from end-to-end is also referred to as trekking or thru-hiking. Multi-day hikes are referred to as backpacking, that can involve camping, mountain huts, or using other forms of accommodation.

== History ==
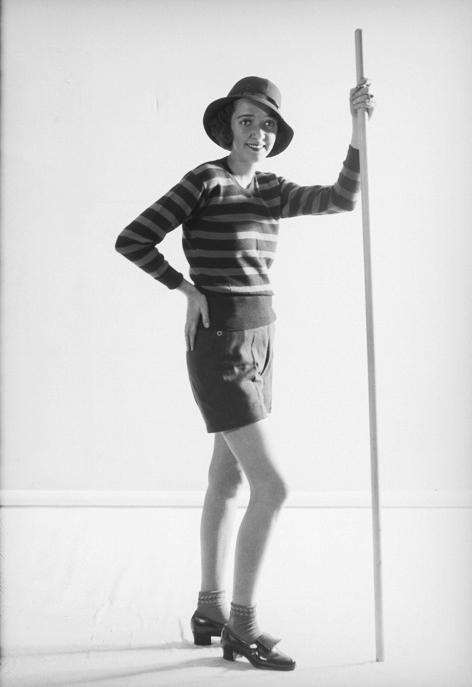
Hiking fashion, 11 July 1932

The 14th-century Italian poet Petrarch is frequently mentioned as an early example of someone hiking. Petrarch recounts that on April 26, 1336, with his brother and two servants, he climbed to the top of Mont Ventoux, which is 1,912 meters (6,273 ft) tall. This is a feat which he undertook for recreation rather than necessity. The exploit is described in a celebrated letter addressed to his friend and confessor, the Augustinian friar Dionigi di Borgo San Sepolcro, composed some time after the fact. However, some have suggested that Petrarch's climb was fictional.

Jakob Burckhardt, in The Civilization of the Renaissance in Italy (in German in 1860) declared Petrarch "a truly modern man", because of the significance of nature for his "receptive spirit"; even if he did not yet have the skill to describe nature. Petrarch's implication that he was the first to climb mountains for pleasure, and Burckhardt's insistence on Petrarch's sensitivity to nature have been often repeated since. There are also numerous references to Petrarch as an "alpinist", although Mont Ventoux is not a hard climb, and is not usually considered part of the Alps. This implicit claim of Petrarch and Burckhardt, that Petrarch was the first to climb a mountain for pleasure since antiquity, was disproven by Lynn Thorndike in 1943. Mount Ventoux was climbed by Jean Buridan, on his way to the papal court in Avignon before the year 1334, "in order to make some meteorological observations". There were ascents accomplished during the Middle Ages; Lynn Thorndike mentions that "a book on feeling for nature in Germany in the tenth and eleventh centuries, noted various ascents and descriptions of mountains from that period", and that "in the closing years of his life archbishop Anno II, Archbishop of Cologne (c. 1010 – 1075) climbed his beloved mountain oftener than usual".

Other early examples of individuals hiking or climbing mountains for pleasure include the Roman Emperor, Hadrian, who ascended Mount Etna during a return trip from Greece in 125 CE. In 1275, Peter III of Aragon claimed to have reached the summit of Pic du Canigou, a 9134-foot mountain located near the southern tip of France. The first ascent of any technical difficulty to be officially verified took place on June 26, 1492, when Antoine de Ville, a chamberlain and military engineer for Charles VIII, King of France, was ordered to ascend Mont Aiguille. Because ropes, ladders and iron hooks were used during the ascent, this event is widely recognized as being the birth of mountaineering. Conrad Gessner, a 16th-century Swiss physician, botanist and naturalist, is widely recognized as being the first person to hike and climb for sheer pleasure.

However, the idea of taking a walk in the countryside only really developed during the 18th century in Europe, and arose because of changing attitudes to the landscape and nature associated with the Romantic movement. In 1790, William Wordsworth set off on an extended tour of France, Switzerland, and Germany, which he describes in his autobiographical poem The Prelude (1850). Walking tours were popular in the 19th century. In earlier times walking generally indicated poverty and was also associated with vagrancy. In previous centuries long walks were undertaken as part of religious pilgrimages and this tradition continues throughout the world.

=== Pilgrimages ===
In earlier times people mainly hiked for practical reasons, or on religious pilgrimages. Numerous modern hiking trail follow such ancient routes. The British National Trail the North Downs Way closely follows that of the Pilgrims' Way to Canterbury.

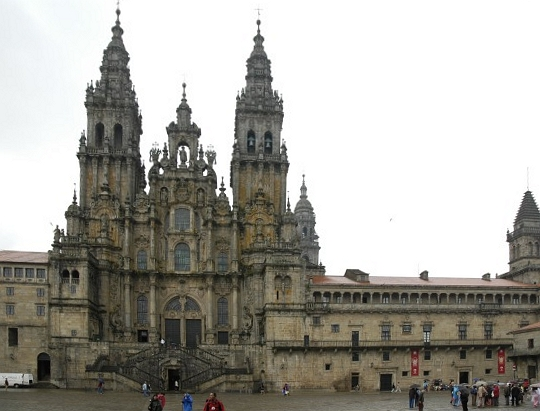
The Cathedral of Santiago de Compostela

The ancient pilgrimage, the Camino de Santiago, or Way of St. James, has become more recently the source for a number of long-distance hiking routes. This is a network of pilgrims' ways leading to the shrine of the apostle Saint James the Great in the cathedral of Santiago de Compostela in Galicia in northwestern Spain. Many follow its routes as a form of spiritual path or retreat for their spiritual growth.

The French Way is the most popular of the routes and runs from Saint-Jean-Pied-de-Port on the French side of the Pyrenees to Roncesvalles on the Spanish side and then another 780 kilometres (480 mi) on to Santiago de Compostela through the major cities of Pamplona, Logroño, Burgos and León. A typical walk on the Camino francés takes at least four weeks, allowing for one or two rest days on the way. Some travel the Camino on bicycle or on horseback. Paths from the cities of Tours, Vézelay, and Le Puy-en-Velay meet at Saint-Jean-Pied-de-Port. The French long-distance path GR 65 (of the Grande Randonnée network), is an important variant route of the old Christian pilgrimage way.

The Abraham Path is a cultural route believed to have been the path of Abraham's journey across the Ancient Near East. The path was established in 2007 as a pilgrimage route between Urfa, Turkey, possibly his birthplace, and his final destination of the desert of Negev.

=== German-speaking world ===
The Swiss scientist and poet Albrecht von Haller's poem Die Alpen (1732) is an historically important early sign of an awakening appreciation of the mountains, though it is chiefly designed to contrast the simple, idyllic life of the inhabitants of the Alps with the corrupt and decadent existence of the dwellers in the plains.

Numerous travellers explored Europe on foot in the last third of the 18th century and recorded their experiences. A significant example is Johann Gottfried Seume, who set out on foot from Leipzig to Sicily in 1801, and returned to Leipzig via Paris after nine months.

=== United Kingdom ===
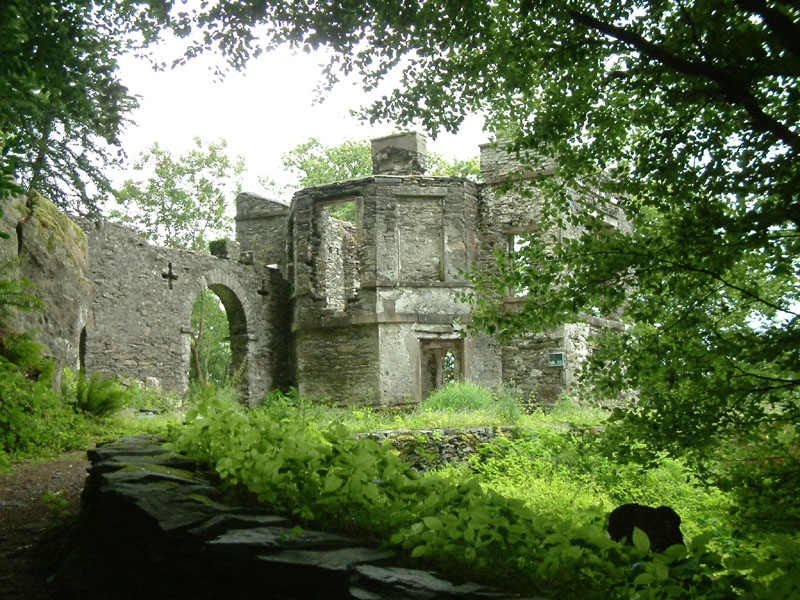
Claife Station, built at one of Thomas West's 'viewing stations', to allow visiting tourists and artists to better appreciate the picturesque Lake District in Cumbria, England.

Thomas West, a Scottish priest, popularized the idea of walking for pleasure in his guide to the Lake District of 1778. In the introduction he wrote that he aimed "to encourage the taste of visiting the lakes by furnishing the traveller with a Guide; and for that purpose, the writer has here collected and laid before him, all the select stations and points of view, noticed by those authors who have last made the tour of the lakes, verified by his own repeated observations." To this end he included various 'stations' or viewpoints around the lakes, from which tourists would be encouraged to enjoy the views in terms of their aesthetic qualities. Published in 1778 the book was a major success.

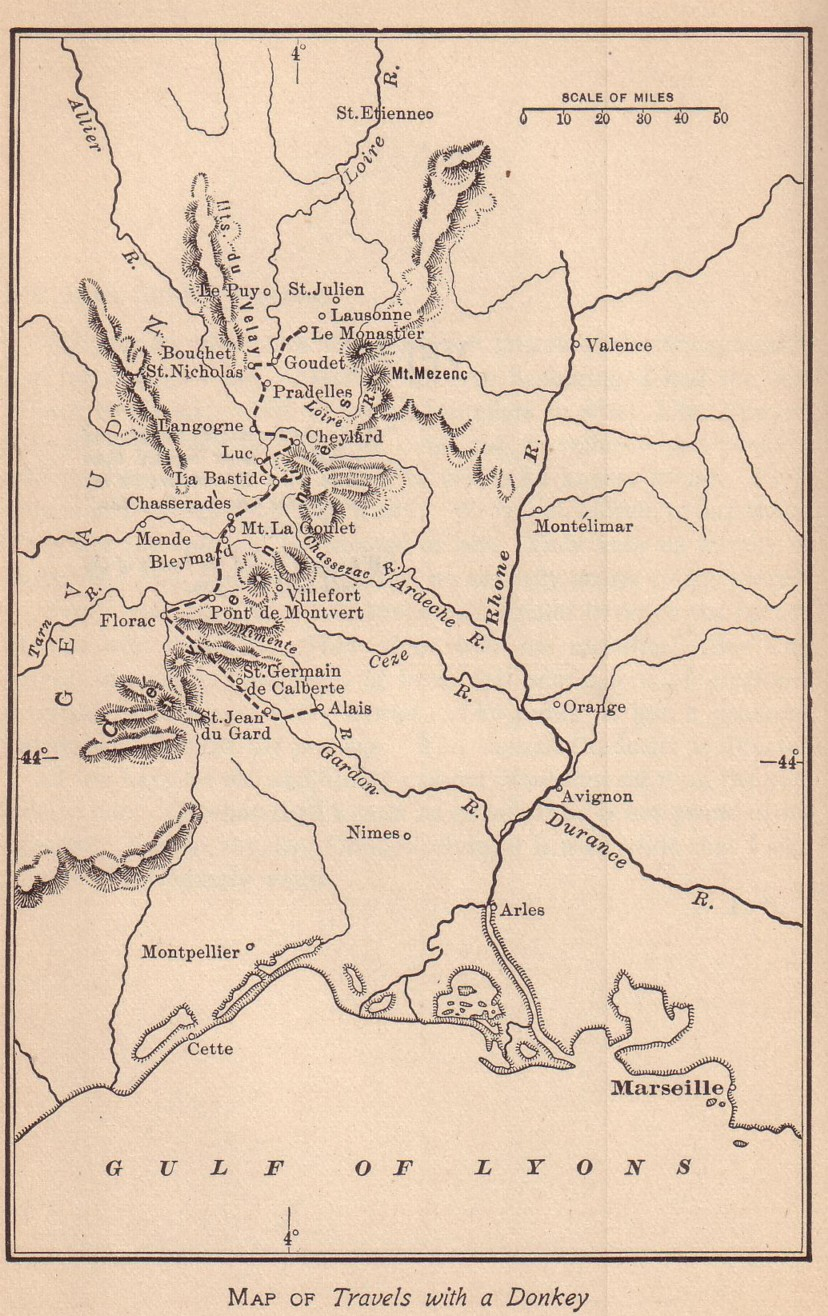
Map of Robert Louis Stevenson's walking route in the Cévennes, France, taken from Travels with a Donkey in the Cévennes (1879), a pioneering classic of outdoor literature.

Another famous early exponent of walking for pleasure was the English poet William Wordsworth. His famous poem Tintern Abbey was inspired by a visit to the Wye Valley made during a walking tour of Wales in 1798 with his sister Dorothy Wordsworth. Wordsworth's friend Coleridge was another keen walker and in the autumn of 1799, he and Wordsworth undertook a three-week tour of the Lake District. John Keats, who belonged to the next generation of Romantic poets, began in June 1818 a walking tour of Scotland, Ireland, and the Lake District with his friend Charles Armitage Brown.

More and more people undertook walking tours through the 19th century, of which the most famous is probably Robert Louis Stevenson's journey through the Cévennes in France with a donkey, recorded in his Travels with a Donkey (1879). Stevenson also published in 1876 his famous essay "Walking Tours". The subgenre of travel writing produced many classics in the subsequent 20th century. An early American example of a book that describes an extended walking tour is the naturalist John Muir's A Thousand Mile Walk to the Gulf (1916), a posthumously published account of a long botanizing walk, undertaken in 1867.

Due to industrialisation in England, people began to migrate to the cities where living standards were often cramped and unsanitary. They would escape the confines of the city by rambling about in the countryside. However, the land in England, particularly around the urban areas of Manchester and Sheffield, was privately owned and trespass was illegal. Rambling clubs soon sprang up in the north and began politically campaigning for the legal 'right to roam'. One of the first such clubs was 'Sunday Tramps' founded by Leslie White in 1879. The first national grouping, the Federation of Rambling Clubs, was formed in London in 1905 and was heavily patronized by the peerage.

Access to Mountains bills, that would have legislated the public's 'right to roam' across some private land, were periodically presented to Parliament from 1884 to 1932 without success. Finally, in 1932, the Rambler's Right Movement organized a mass trespass on Kinder Scout in Derbyshire. Despite attempts on the part of the police to prevent the trespass from going ahead, it was successfully achieved due to massive publicity. However, the Mountain Access Bill that was passed in 1939 was opposed by many walkers' organizations, including The Ramblers, who felt that it did not sufficiently protect their rights, and it was eventually repealed.

The effort to improve access led after World War II to the National Parks and Access to the Countryside Act 1949, and in 1951 to the creation of the first national park in the UK, the Peak District National Park. The establishment of this and similar national parks helped to improve access for all outdoors enthusiasts. The Countryside and Rights of Way Act 2000 considerably extended the right to roam in England and Wales.

=== United States ===
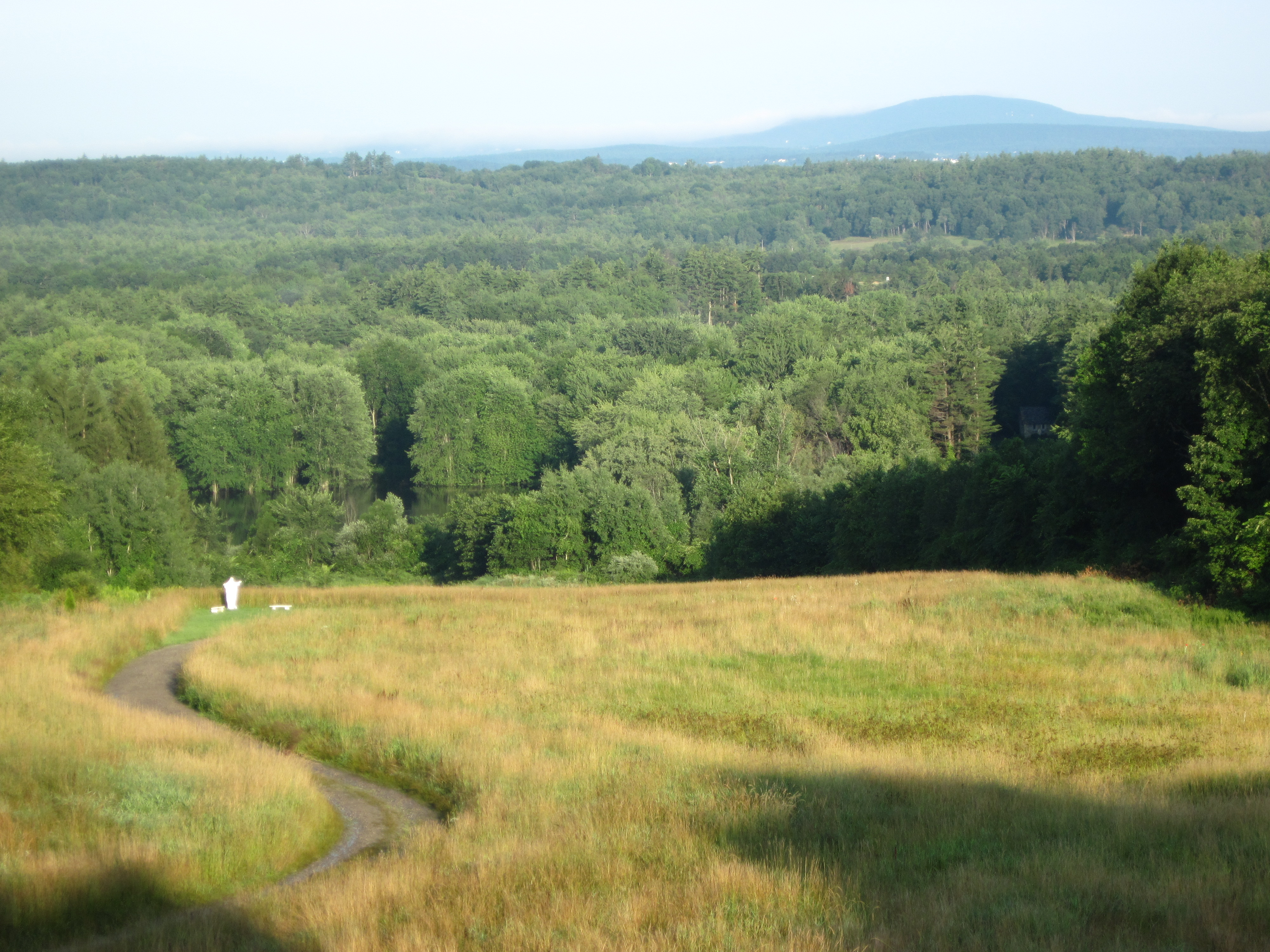
The American philosopher Henry David Thoreau walked 34 miles (55 km) to Mount Wachusett, shown here.

An early example of an interest in hiking in the United States is Abel Crawford and his son Ethan's clearing of a trail to the summit of Mount Washington, New Hampshire in 1819. This 8.5-mile path is the oldest continually used hiking trail in the United States. The influence of British and European Romanticism reached North America through the transcendentalist movement, and both Ralph Waldo Emerson (1803–1882) and Henry David Thoreau (1817–1862) were important influences on the outdoors movement in North America. Thoreau's writing on nature and on walking include the posthumously published "Walking" (1862)". His earlier essay "A Walk to Wachusett" (1842) describes a four-day walking tour Thoreau took with a companion from Concord, Massachusetts to the summit of Mount Wachusett, Princeton, Massachusetts and back. Established in 1876, the Appalachian Mountain Club has the distinction of being the oldest hiking club in America. It was founded to protect the trails and mountains in the northeastern United States. Prior to its founding, four other hiking clubs had already been established in America. This included the very short-lived (first) Rocky Mountain Club in 1875, the White Mountain Club of Portland in 1873, the Alpine Club of Williamstown in 1863, and the Exploring Circle, which was established by four men from Lynn, Massachusetts in 1850. Although not a hiking club in the same sense as the clubs that would emerge later, the National Park Service recognizes the Exploring Circle as being "the first hiking club in New England." All four of these clubs would disband within a few years of their founding.

Despite clubs such as the Appalachian Mountain Club, hiking during the early twentieth century was still primarily in New England, San Francisco, and the Pacific Northwest. Eventually, there were similar clubs formed in the Midwest and following the Appalachian range. As interest grew hiking culture was spread throughout the nation.

The Scottish-born, American naturalist John Muir (1838 –1914), was another important early advocate of the preservation of wilderness in the United States. He petitioned the U.S. Congress for the National Park bill that was passed in 1890, establishing Yosemite and Sequoia National Parks. The Sierra Club, which he founded, is now one of the most important conservation organizations in the United States. The spiritual quality and enthusiasm toward nature expressed in his writings inspired others, including presidents and congressmen, to take action to help preserve large areas of undeveloped countryside. He is today referred to as the "Father of the National Parks". In 1916, the National Park Service was created to protect national parks and monuments.

In 1921, Benton MacKaye, a forester, conceived the idea of what would become America's first National Scenic Trail, the Appalachian Trail (AT). The AT was completed in August 1937, running from Maine to Georgia. The Pacific Crest Trail ("PCT") was first explored in the 1930s by the YMCA hiking groups and was eventually registered as a complete border to border trail from Mexico to Canada.

== Destinations ==
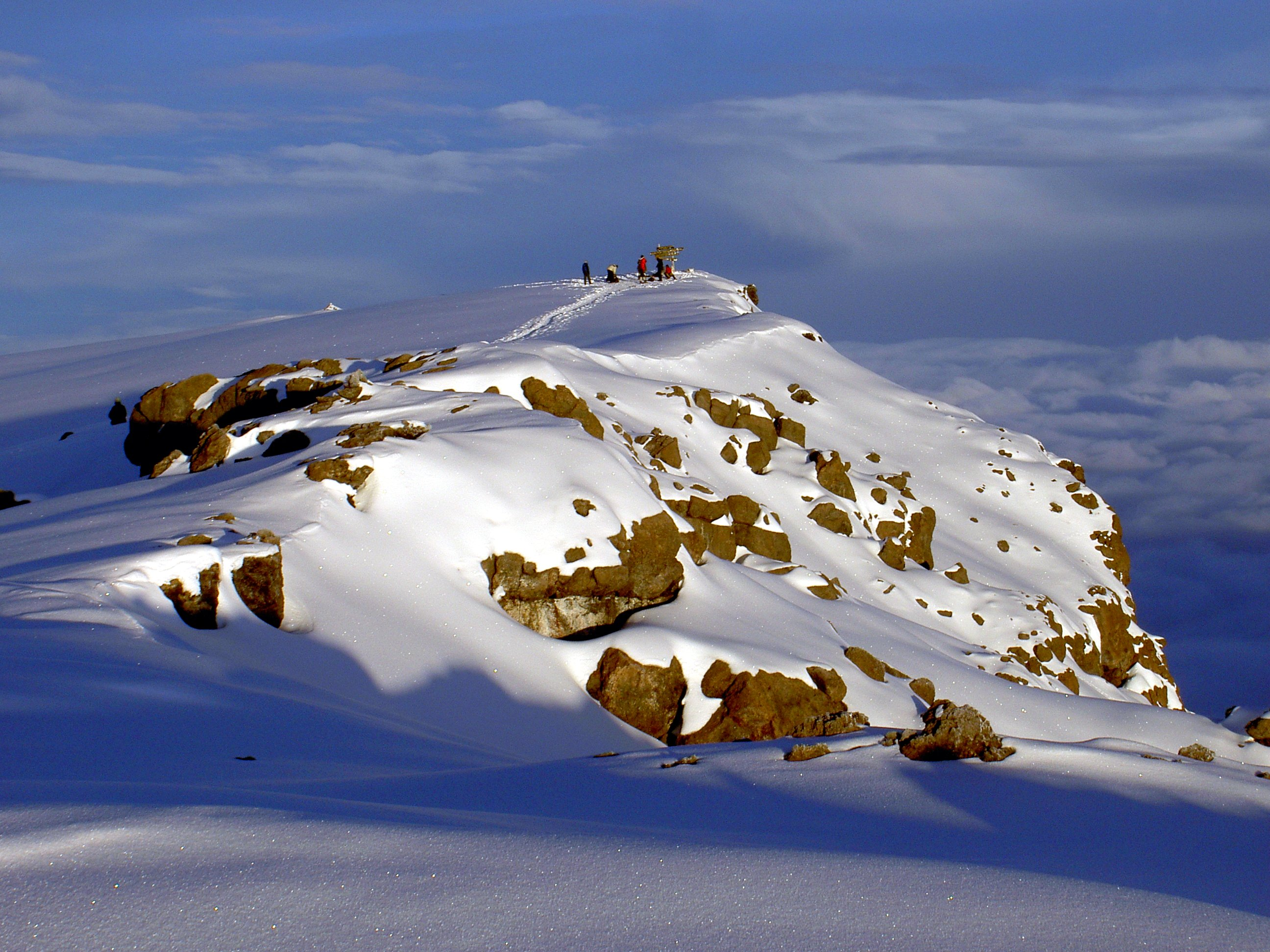
Mount Kilimanjaro, Tanzania

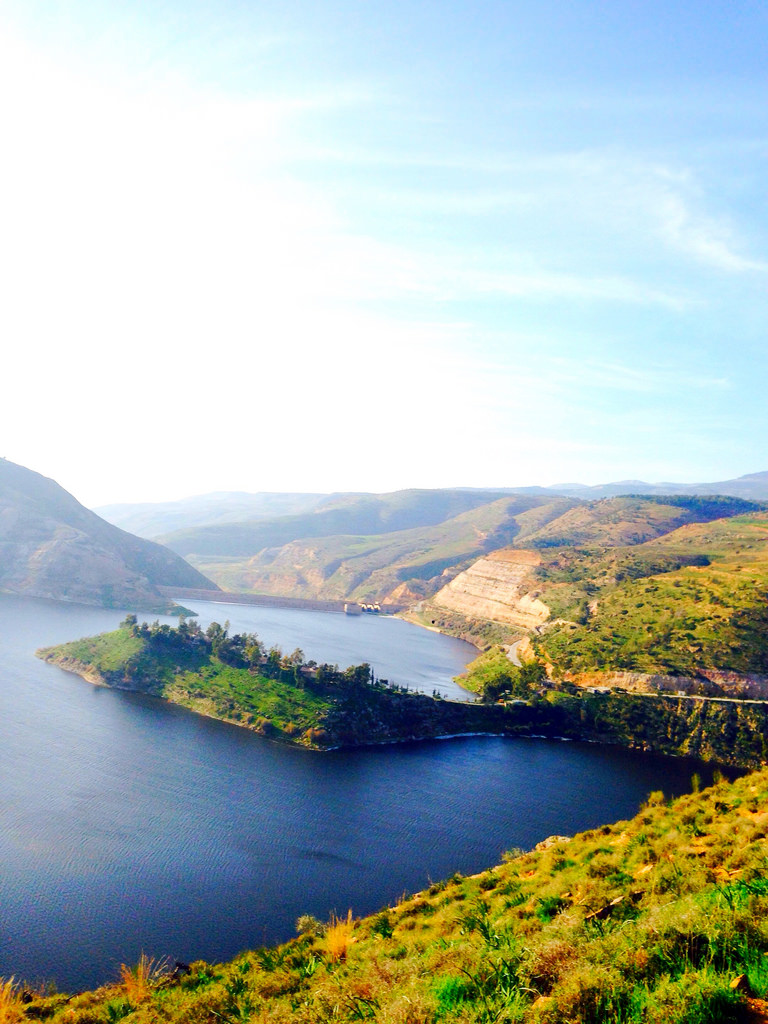
The King Talal Dam in Jerash lies along the Jordan Trail in Jordan

National parks are often important hiking destinations, such as National Parks of England and Wales; of Canada; of New Zealand, of South Africa, etc.

Nowadays, long-distance hikes (walking tours) are often undertaken along long-distance paths, including the National Trails in England and Wales, the Kungsleden (Sweden) and the National Trail System in the United States. The Grande Randonnée (France), Grote Routepaden, or Lange-afstand-wandelpaden (The Netherlands), Grande Rota (Portugal), Gran Recorrido (Spain) is a network of long-distance footpaths in Europe, mostly in France, Belgium, the Netherlands and Spain. There are extensive networks in other European countries of long-distance trails, as well as in Canada, Australia, New Zealand, Nepal, and to a lesser extent other Asiatic countries, like Turkey, Israel, and Jordan. In the mountains of Norway, Sweden, Austria, Slovenia, Switzerland, Germany, France, and Italy walking tours can be made from 'hut-to-hut', using an extensive system of mountain huts.

In the late 20th century, there has been a proliferation of official and unofficial long-distance routes, which mean that hikers now are more likely to refer to using a long-distance way (Britain), trail (US), The Grande Randonnée (France), etc., than setting out on a walking tour. Early examples of long-distance paths include the Appalachian Trail in the US and the Pennine Way in Britain.

Organized hiking clubs emerged in Europe at approximately the same time as official hiking trails. These clubs established and upheld their own paths during the 19th and 20th centuries, prioritizing the development of extended hiking routes. In 1938, one of the first long-distance hiking trails in Europe, the Hungarian National Blue Trail, was established. It now extends for more than 1,100 km (680 miles) today.

=== Asia ===
In the Middle East, the Jordan Trail is a 650 km (400 miles) long hiking trail in Jordan established in 2015 by the Jordan Trail Association. And Israel has been described as "a trekker's paradise" with over 9,656 km (6,000 miles) of trails.

In southwestern Turkey the Lycian Way is a marked long-distance trail around part of the coast of ancient Lycia. It is over 500 km (310 mi) in length and stretches from Hisarönü (Ovacık), near Fethiye, to Geyikbayırı in Konyaaltı about 20 km (12 mi) from Antalya. It was conceived by Briton Kate Clow, who lives in Turkey. It takes its name from the ancient civilization, which once ruled the area.

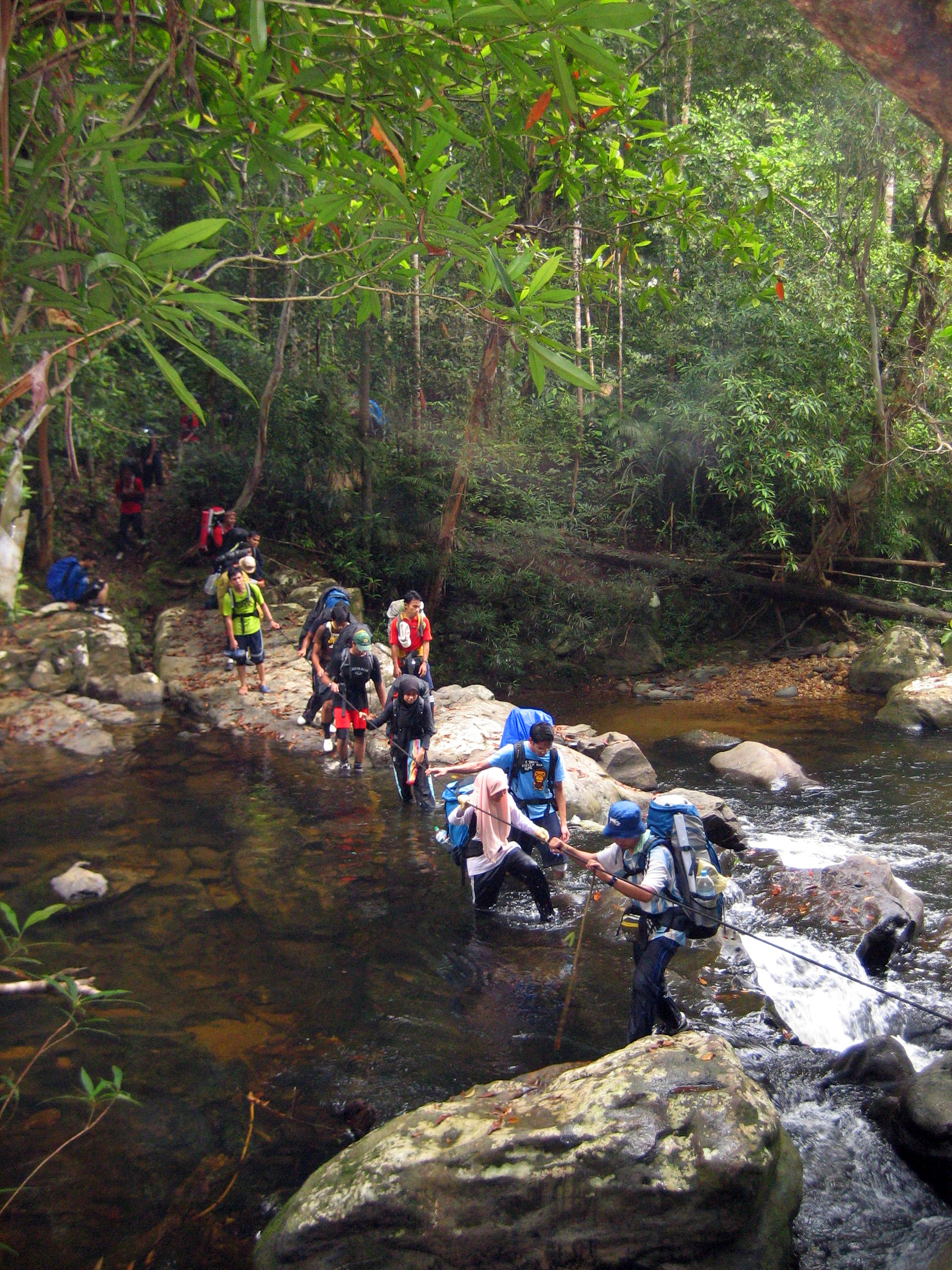
Hikers making a river crossing near Mount Tahan in Malaysia

The Great Himalaya Trail is a route across the Himalayas. The original concept of the trail was to establish a single long distance trekking trail from the east end to the west end of Nepal that includes a total of roughly 1,700 kilometres (1,100 mi) of path. The proposed trail will link together a range of the less explored tourism destinations of Nepal's mountain region.

=== Latin America ===
In Latin America, Peru and Chile are important hiking destinations. The Inca Trail to Machu Picchu in Peru is very popular and a permit is required. The longest hiking trail in Chile is the informal 3,000 km (1,850 mi) Greater Patagonia Trail that was created by a non-governmental initiative.

=== Africa ===
In Africa a major trekking destination is Mount Kilimanjaro, a dormant volcano in Tanzania, which is the highest mountain in Africa and the highest single free-standing mountain in the world: 5,895 metres (19,341 ft) above sea level and about 4,900 metres (16,100 ft) above its plateau base.

According to the Kilimanjaro National Park Authority, 467,190 travelers visited Mount Kilimanjaro between 2013 and 2022, with over 45,000 climbers recorded in 2023.

== Equipment ==
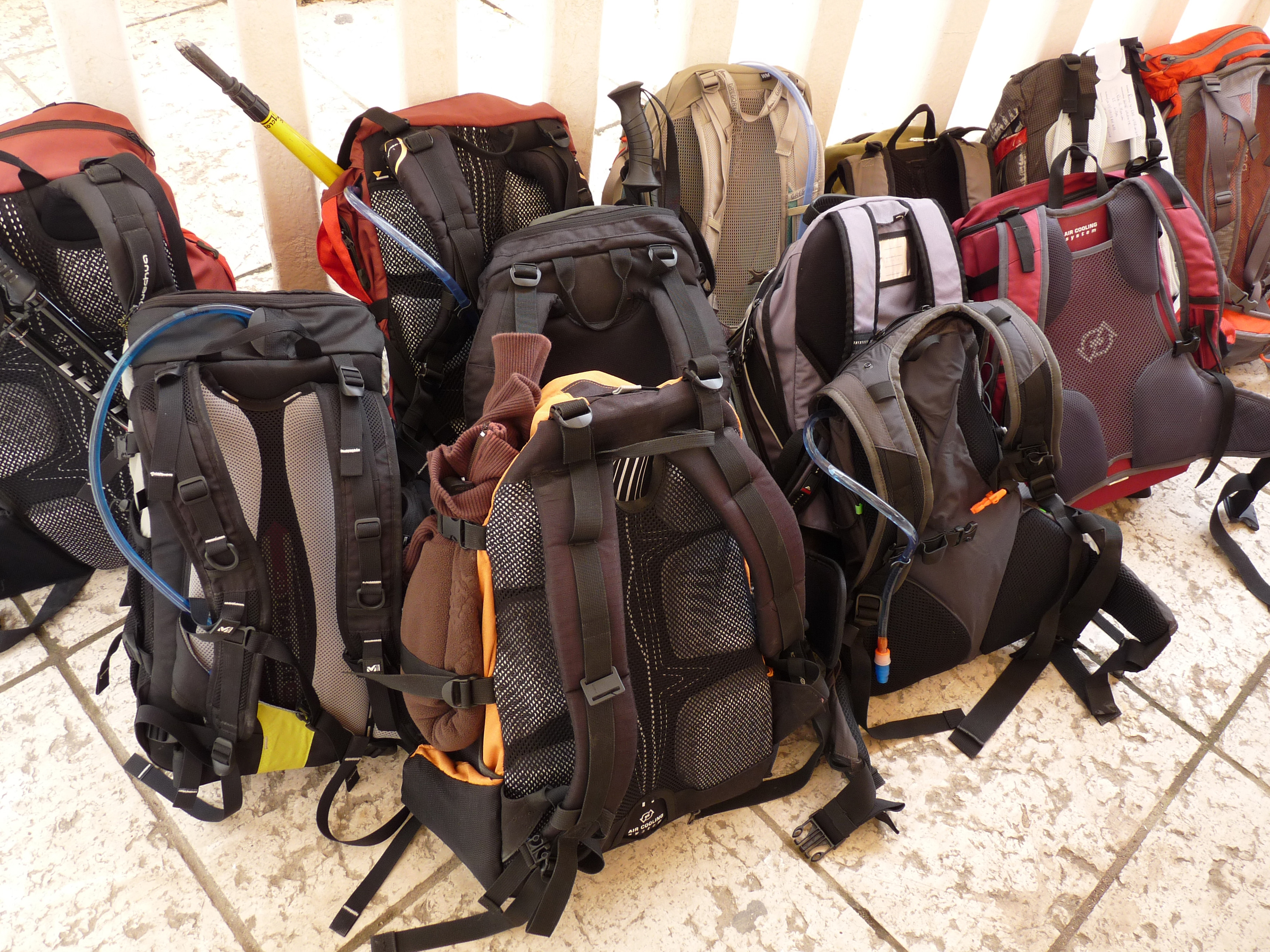
Backpacks are commonly used on hikes

The equipment required depends on a variety of factors, such as terrain, climate and time of year. Hikers have traditionally worn sturdy hiking boots for stability, however, in recent decades trail running shoes have become more popular. Boots, however, are still common in mountainous terrain. The Mountaineers club recommends a list of "Ten Essentials" equipment for hiking, including a compass, sunglasses, sunscreen, a head lamp, a first aid kit, a fire starter, and a knife. Other recommend items are a hat, gloves, and an emergency blanket. A GPS navigation device can also be helpful and trekking poles are also recommended, especially when carrying a heavy backpack.

== Environmental impact ==
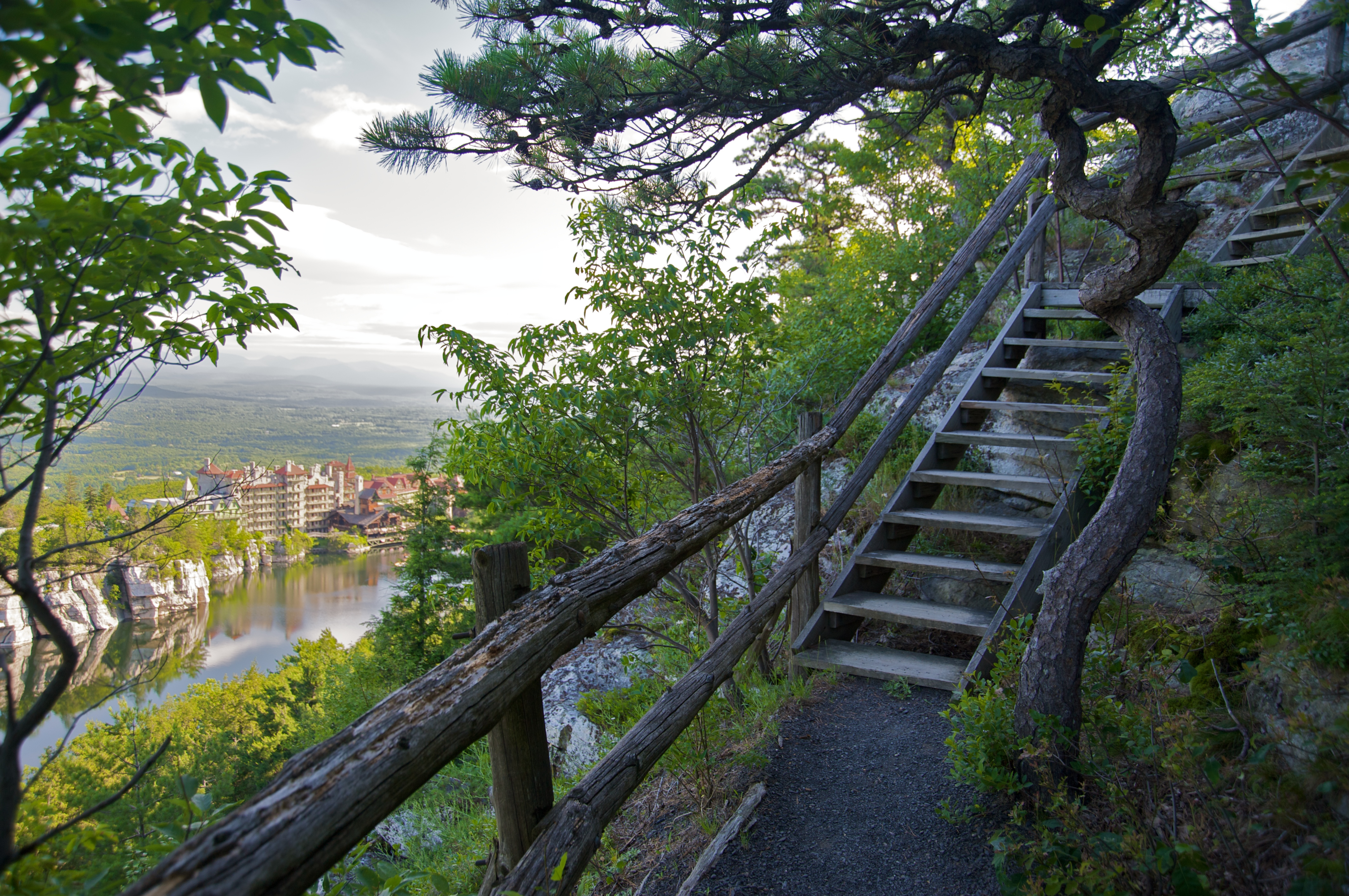
Parts of many hiking trails around Lake Mohonk, New York State, US, include stairways which can prevent erosion

Natural environments are often fragile and may be accidentally damaged and some species are very sensitive to the presence of humans, especially around mating season. Many hikers adopt the philosophy of Leave No Trace, following strict practices on dealing with food waste, and other impacts on the environment. Fire is a particular source of danger.

== Etiquette ==
Because hikers may come into conflict with other users of the land or may harm the natural environment, hiking etiquette has developed.

- When two groups of hikers meet on a steep trail, a custom has developed in some areas whereby the group moving uphill has the right-of-way.
- Various organizations recommend that hikers generally avoid making loud sounds, such as shouting or loud conversation, playing music, or the use of mobile phones. However, in bear country, hikers use intentional noise-making as a safety precaution to avoid startling bears.
- The Leave No Trace movement offers a set of guidelines for low-impact hiking: "Leave nothing but footprints. Take nothing but photos. Kill nothing but time. Keep nothing but memories".
- Hikers are advised not to feed wild animals, because they will become a danger to other hikers if they become habituated to human food, and may have to be killed, or relocated.
- Hikers are advised to verify whether tour operators adhere to fair treatment practices for their support crews, including providing proper wages and working conditions for porters.

== Hazards ==
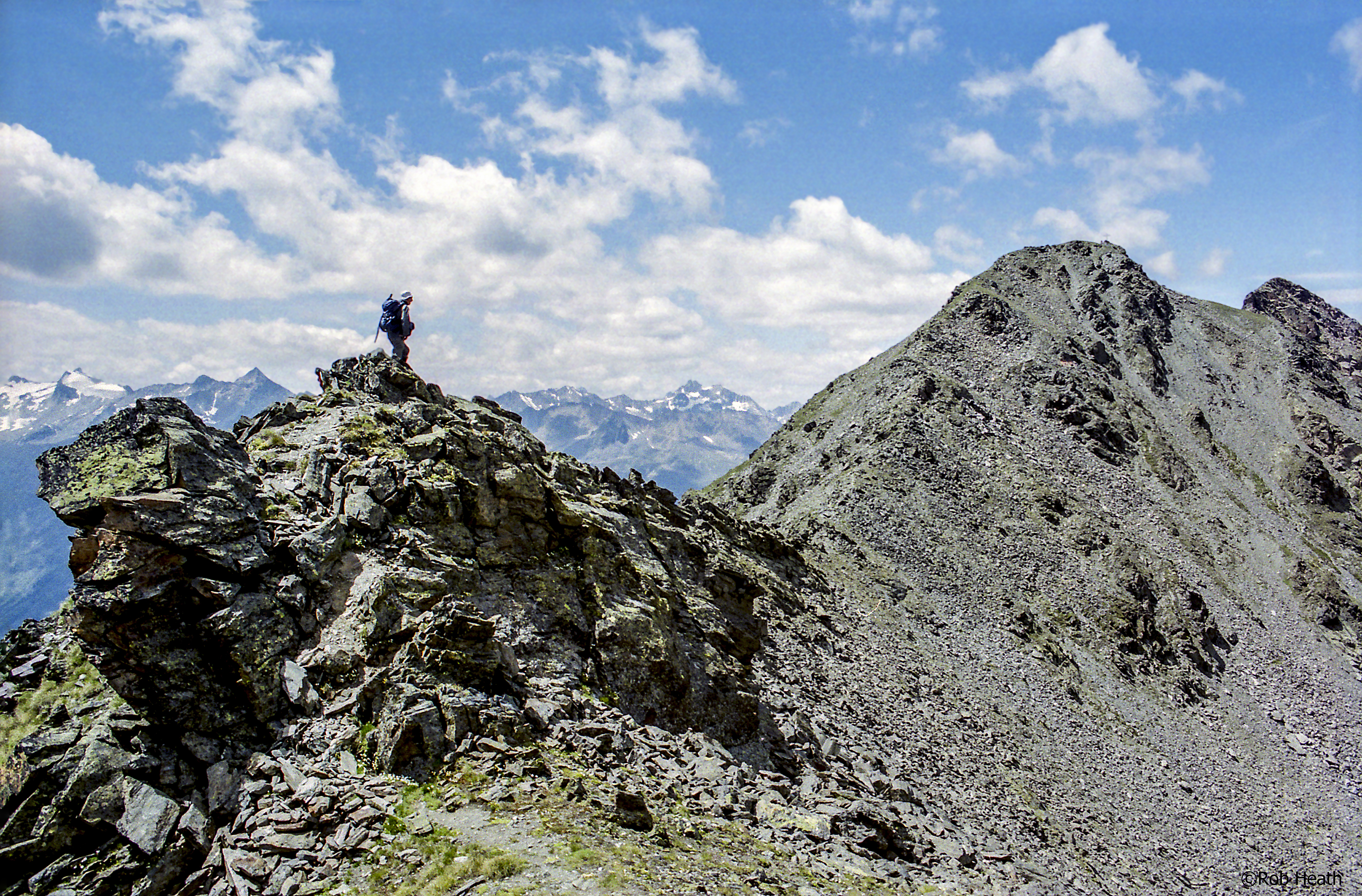
Hiking on an arête, Ötztal Alps, Austria, an example of a hiking route that involves sure-footedness and a head for heights

Hiking can be hazardous because of terrain, inclement weather, potential to get lost, or pre-existing medical conditions. The dangerous circumstances hikers can face include specific accidents or physical ailments. It is especially hazardous in high mountains, crossing rivers and glaciers, and when there is snow and ice. At times hiking may involve scrambling, as well as the use of ropes, ice axes and crampons and the skill to properly use them.

Potential hazards involving physical ailments may include dehydration, frostbite, hypothermia, sunburn, sunstroke, or diarrhea, and such injuries as ankle sprains, or broken bones. Hypothermia is a danger for all hikers and especially inexperienced hikers. Weather does not need to be very cold to be dangerous since ordinary rain or mist has a strong cooling effect. In high mountains a further danger is altitude sickness. This typically occurs only above 2,500 metres (8,000 ft), though some are affected at lower altitudes. Risk factors include a prior episode of altitude sickness, a high degree of activity, and a rapid increase in elevation.

Other threats include aggressive animals or contact with noxious plants. Lightning is also a threat, especially on high ground.

Walkers in high mountains may encounter hazardous snow and ice conditions. Year-round glaciers are potentially hazardous. The crossing of rivers may be dangerous and requires special techniques.

=== Border crossings ===
National borders can be poorly marked and may also be hazardous when there is conflict between the countries which share the border. Within the Schengen Area, which includes most of the E.U., and associated nations like Switzerland and Norway, there are no impediments to crossing by path, and borders are not always obvious.

It is illegal to cross into the US on the Pacific Crest Trail from Canada. Going south to north it is more straightforward and a crossing can be made, if advanced arrangements are made with Canada Border Services. In 2009, Iran imprisoned three Americans for hiking across the Iran-Iraq border.

== Potential for health benefits ==
Hiking may confer health benefits, including positive impacts on both physical and mental health.

Researchers have noted that hiking may motivate individuals seeking weight loss or weight management, mainly because of its diverse nature and also by the associated fun and enjoyment of life found through hiking with others (group hiking). Hiking has also been noted as being more economically viable for exercise compared to other alternatives.

== Winter hiking ==
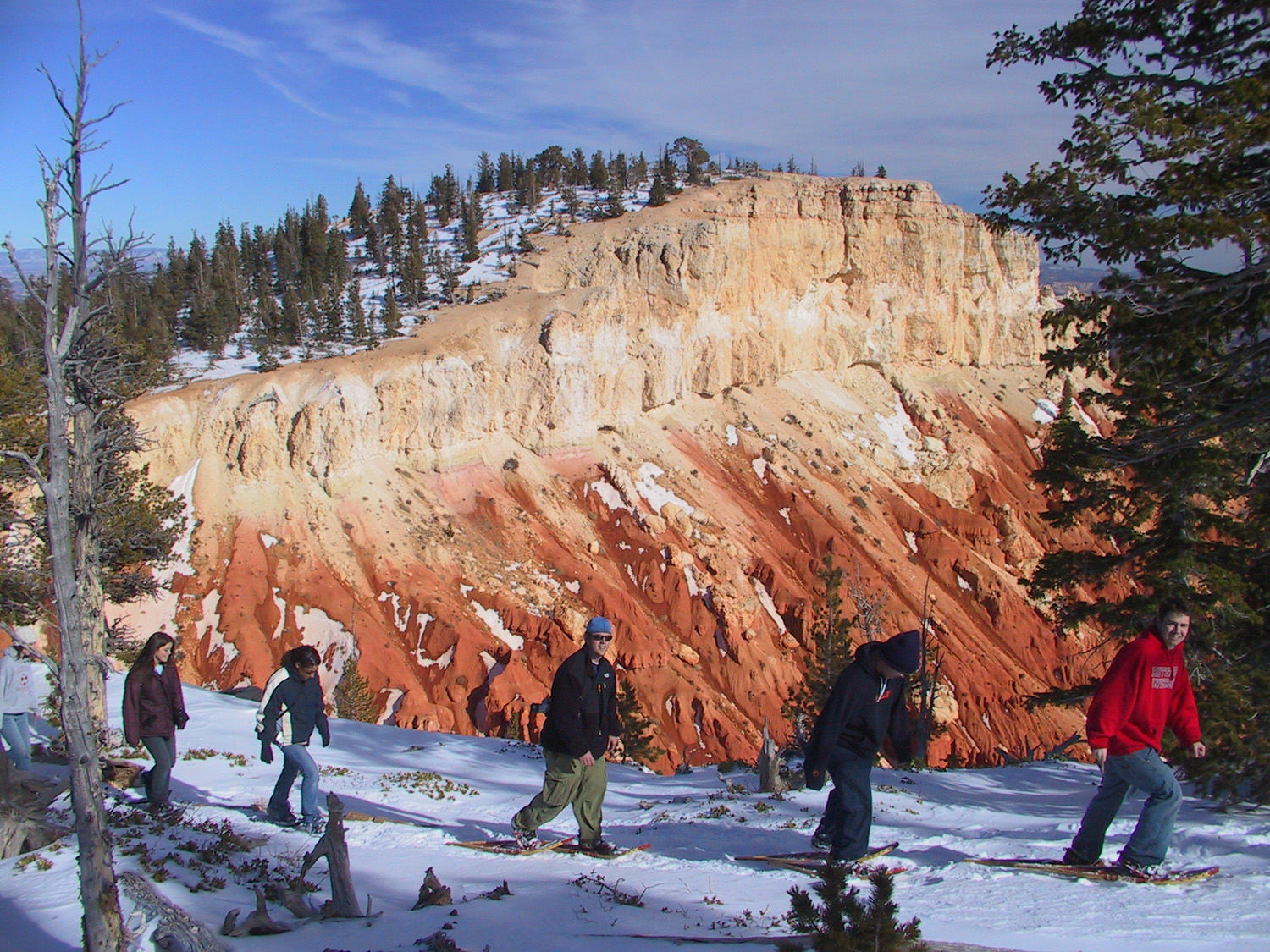
Snowshoers in Bryce Canyon, Utah, U.S.

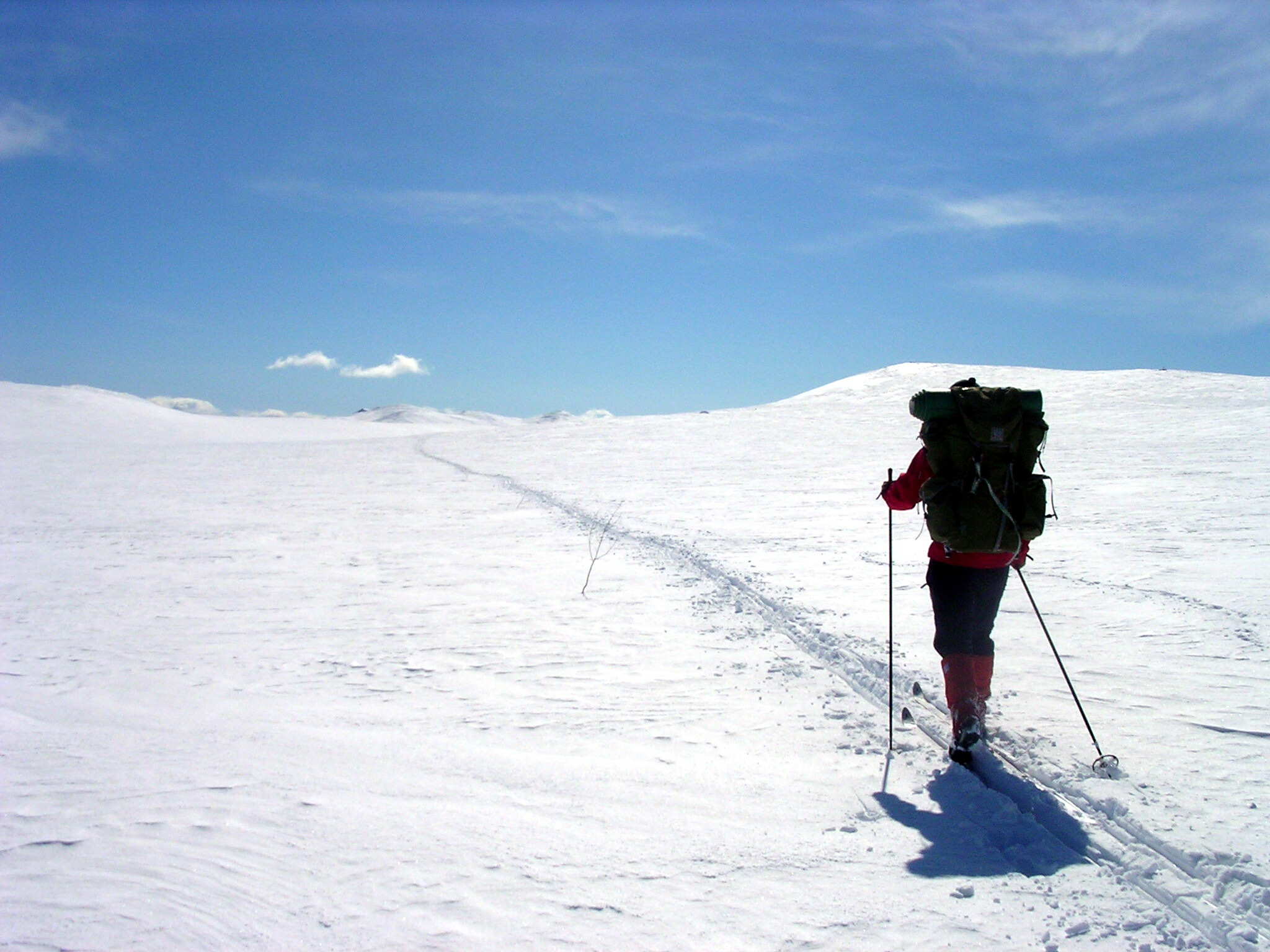
Cross-country skiing (including Ski touring) gives access to hiking trails in winter

Hiking in winter offers additional opportunities, challenges and hazards. Crampons may be needed in icy conditions, and an ice axe is recommended on steep, snow covered paths. Snowshoes and hiking poles, or cross country skis are useful aid for those hiking in deep snow.

Cross country skiing is a form of winter hiking and in Norway the Norwegian Trekking Association maintains over 400 huts stretching across thousands of kilometres of trails which hikers can use in the summer and skiers in the winter. For longer routes in snowy conditions, hikers may resort to ski touring, using special skis and boots.

== See also ==
- Historic roads and trails
- Outdoor literature
- Trail difficulty rating system

=== Types ===
- Backpacking (hiking). And, in winter, Ski touring
- Dog hiking – hiking where a dog carries a pack
- Fastpacking – fast hiking with light gear
- Glacier hiking – hiking on a glacier that has affinities to mountaineering
- Llama hiking – hiking where llamas accompany people
- Nordic walking – fitness walking with trekking poles
- Swimhiking – a sport that combines hiking and swimming
- Ultralight backpacking – carrying the least amount of gear necessary
- Waterfalling – hiking that explores waterfalls

=== Related activities ===
- Cross-country skiing – hiking snow with the aid of skis
- Fell running – the sport of running over rough mountainous ground, often off-trail
- Geocaching – an outdoor treasure-hunting game
- Orienteering – a sport that involves navigation with a map and compass
- Peak bagging – ticking-off a list of mountain peaks climbed
- Pilgrimage – a journey of moral or spiritual significance
- River trekking – a combination of trekking and climbing and sometimes swimming along a river
- Rogaining – a sport of long-distance cross-country navigation
- Snow shoeing – walking across deep snow on snow shoes
- Thru-hiking – hiking an established long-distance hiking trail continuously in one direction
- Trail blazing – using signages to mark a hiking route (known as way-marking in Europe)
- Trail running – running on trails

== Bibliography ==
- Amata, Joseph (2004). On Foot, A History of Walking. New York: New York University Press. ISBN 978-0-8147-0502-5. See summary of contents
- Berger, Karen (2017). Great Hiking Trails of the World. New York: Rizzoli. ISBN 978-0-847-86093-7.
- Chamberlin, Silas (2016). On the Trail: A History of American Hiking. Yale University Press.
- Doran, Jeffrey J. (2026). Ramble On: A History of Hiking. Amazon Digital Services LLC – Kdp. ISBN 979-8-2782-5927-5.
- Gros, Frédéric (2014). A Philosophy of Walking. Translated by Howe, John. London, New York: Verso. ISBN 978-1-78168-270-8.
- Solnit, Rebecca (2000). Wanderlust: a history of walking. New York: Viking.
