= List of Dragons' Den (British TV programme) offers Series 21-present =

The following is a list of offers made on the British reality television series Dragons' Den in Series 21–present, aired from 2024.

== Series overview ==
Series	Episodes	Start	End	Network
Series 21 (2024)	14	4 January 2024	4 April 2024	BBC One
Series 22 (2025)	14	9 January 2025	30 October 2025	BBC One
Series 23 (2026)	14	29 January 2026	25 September 2026	BBC One

== Successful pitches ==
=== Series 21 ===
Episode	First aired	Entrepreneur(s)	Company or product name	Money requested (£)	Equity given %	Description of product	Investing dragon(s)	Result after filming	Website	Fate
Episode 1	4 January 2024	Christian and Ross Liang, and Natalie Dickenson (Note: Ross Liang was the first entrepreneur who has down's syndrome to gain investment on the show.)	Standout Enterprises Ltd	30,000	20	Socks company employing people who have learning-disabilities	Steven Bartlett and Peter Jones	Signed		Active
Episode 1	4 January 2024	Daniel Barnes and Rosalina Tejoprayinto	Pop Specs	75,000	12	Express manufactured spectacles	Sara Davies, Peter Jones, and Touker Suleyman	Unclear (Note: Pop Specs investment status remains unclear. There is no record of any dragons being listed as shareholders or directors. Press reaction at the time suggested that the company may have plagiarised the spectacles from BBC sitcom Absolutely Fabulous. Remains active.)		Active
Episode 1	4 January 2024	Colin O’Brien	Peggy Rain Ltd	80,000	45 (Drops to 25% if repaid within 12 months, or 30% if longer.)	Eco-friendly protection for washing lines	Touker Suleyman	Signed		Active
Episode 1	4 January 2024	Oliver John-Miller, Benjamin and Joseph Gallagher	Luxe Collective	100,000	3	Luxury second-hand marketplace	Steven Bartlett	Signed (Note: Luxe Collective's investment was completed, however the company folded by 2025 citing a warehouse robbery of over £500,000 in stock as effectively 'ruining the company.' Remains active.)		Liquidation (2025)
Episode 2	11 January 2024	Alexander Nicolaou and Nicole Stanton	NINI Organics	50,000	20	Organic skincare products	Steven Bartlett and Peter Jones	Signed		Active
Episode 2	11 January 2024	Derry Green	The Secret Garden Glamping	100,000	5	Luxury glamping destination	Deborah Meaden	Unclear (Note: The Secret Garden Glamping's investment status remains unclear. Green promoted the pitch as successful, however there is no record of Meaden's investment progressing after filming. Remains active.)		Active
Episode 3	18 January 2024	Sian and John Colderly	Cosy Cinema	60,000	20	Pod sized cinema booths	Gary Neville and Touker Suleyman	Unclear (Note: Cosy Cinema's investment status remains unclear. The Colderly's stated that they had met with both dragons since filming, however there is no record of an investment being made. Company in liquidation as of 2025.)		Liquidation (2025)
Episode 3	18 January 2024	Giselle Boxer (Note: Giselle Boxer was the first entrepreneur to receive offers from six dragons.)	Acu Seeds	50,000	12.5	Needle-free ear acupuncture	Steven Bartlett	Deal withdrawn (Note: See Acu seeds controversy)		Active
Episode 3	18 January 2024	Liam Brown	Full Power Cacao	50,000	25 (Steven Bartlett and Peter Jones hold 10% whilst Gary Neville will hold 5%)	Cacao powered energy drink	Steven Bartlett, Peter Jones and Gary Neville	Signed		Active
Episode 4	26 January 2024	Pavan Dhanjal	Pavan Beauty	50,000	40 (Reduces to 20% if repaid within 12 months)	South Asian beauty regime	Touker Suleyman	Signed		Active
Episode 4	26 January 2024	Jessica Warch and Sidney Neuhaus	Kimaï	250,000	3	Fine jewellery line	Steven Bartlett	Signed		Active
Episode 5	1 February 2024	Victor Carpio	Inventor Cat	45,000	40	Toothbrush for cats	Deborah Meaden	Unclear (Note: Inventor Cat's investment status remains unclear. Carpio has promoted his appearance as successful, however there is no record of Meaden being listed as shareholder or director. Remains active.)		Active
Episode 5	1 February 2024	Simon Hood and Charlene Mitchell-Hood	Sopper Books	5 (Note: Sopper Books' pitch for £1, valuation of £100 and investment of £5 is the lowest in the show’s history to date.)	5	Online library of bespoke curated and narrated books	All five dragons	Signed		Active
Episode 6	8 February 2024	Titi Belo	Ori Lifestyle	60,000	25	Afro hairstyle products	Emma Grede	Signed		Active
Episode 6	8 February 2024	Charlie Gilpin and Sam Moss	Stocked	50,000	6	Frozen food stored in blocks	Steven Bartlett	Signed		Active
Episode 6	8 February 2024	Ciaran and Denise Byrne	The Head Plan	80,000	10	Range of wellness products and journals.	Peter Jones	Signed		Active
Episode 7	15 February 2024	Jasmine Wicks-Stephens	Faace	60,000	15	Skincare brand	Steven Bartlett and Peter Jones and Touker Suleyman	Signed		Active
Episode 7	15 February 2024	Gemma Connolly	Scoff Paper	50,000	25	Edible potato-infused gift cards for dogs	Sara Davies	Signed		Active
Episode 7	15 February 2024	Mike Gordon and Ben Whittaker	Kerbo Charge	50,000	6	Protective cover for EV charging cables	Deborah Meaden	Signed		Active
Episode 8	22 February 2024	Joe Woolf	Tasty Mates	60,000	20 (15% once investment is repaid)	Gummy candy range	Peter Jones	Signed (Note: Tasty Mates' investment was completed, however the company suffered losses of over £500,000 following chain issues and the loss of a key airline contract following the outbreak of the Russia-Ukraine conflict, resulting in the company folding by 2025. Dissolved by 2026.)		Dissolved (2026)
Episode 8	22 February 2024	Dave Weller	Randy Cow	80,000	40	Waterproof pocket beachwear	Peter Jones and Touker Suleyman	Failed (Note: Randy Cow's investment is believed to have failed. Weller defined the overall experience as stressful and stated the dragons 'wished him all the best,' indicating no progression following filming. Remains active.)		Active
Episode 9	29 February 2024	Martin Orty and Jane Sibley	Sibstar	125,000	10 (plus 5% advisory shares for each dragon)	Financial spending for dementia	Sara Davies and Deborah Meaden	Signed		Active
Episode 9	29 February 2024	Joe Gray and Lottie White	Myo Master	100,000	10 (Drops to 5% if investment is repaid within 12 months)	Sports recovery products	Sara Davies and Gary Neville	Failed (Note: Myo Master declined the investment following filming, with White stating she felt they would lose control of the business should they have accepted it. Remains active.)		Active
Episode 10	7 March 2024	Diane Challender	Zebedee Any Angle	75,000	40 (Drops to 30% if investment is repaid within 18 months)	Non-slip clothes rails	Sara Davies	Signed		Active
Episode 10	7 March 2024	João Andrade and Camillo Scarselli	One Hundred Group	100,000	5 (Bartlett will also take 5% royalties on sales of merchandise until the investment is repaid)	Trail-running world championship	Steven Bartlett	Failed (Note: One Hundred Group's investment appears to have failed. Joᾶo Andrade has suggested that during the gap between filming and the episode airing, the company partnered with another investor. Remains active.)		Active
Episode 11	14 March 2024	Kitty August	The Natural Play Makeup Company	75,000	20	Children's make-up	Deborah Meaden	Unclear (Note: The Natural Play Makeup Company's investment status remains unclear. There is no record of Meaden being listed as a shareholder or director. Remains active.)		Active
Episode 11	14 March 2024	Anthony Cherry	Time:O:Stat	80,000	30 (Reduces to 20% upon investment being repaid)	Thermostat for landlords	Touker Suleyman	Unclear (Note: Time:O:Stat's investment status remains unclear. Press reaction to the pitch was generally negative, indicating the possibility of Suleyman withdrawing. Remains active.)		Active
Episode 12	21 March 2024	Amelia Christie-Miller	Bold Bean Co	50,000	7.5	Seasoned butter beans	Deborah Meaden	Failed (Note: Bold Bean Co's investment does not appear to have completed. Miller has suggested she was dissatisfied with sales and growth in the months following her appearance and has been critical of how her pitch was edited. Remains active.)		Active
Episode 12	21 March 2024	Flinty Bane and Ben Barter	Skin	50,000	10	Price comparison app for skin products	Sara Davies	Signed		Active
Episode 13	28 March 2024	Gina Farren	Glaize Manicure	100,000	8	Stick on finger nails	Sara Davies and Deborah Meaden	Unclear (Note: Glaize Manicure's investment status remains unclear. Farren promoted her pitch as successful, however there is no record of the dragons being listed as shareholders or directors. Remains active.)		Active
Episode 13	28 March 2024	Louise and Ian Toll	Furr Boost Drink	50,000	30 (Drops to 20% if investment is repaid within 12 months.)	Vitamin based smoothies for dogs	Touker Suleyman	Failed (Note: Furr Boost Drink's website blog suggests the investment was withdrawn during due diligence. Remains active.)		Active
Episode 14	4 April 2024	Charlotte and Grant Clemence	Yard Art UK Ltd	50,000	35 (Drops to 25% if investment is repaid within 18 months.)	Outdoor art pieces	Steven Bartlett and Sara Davies	Unclear (Note: Yard Art's investment status remains unclear. There is no record of the dragons being listed as shareholders or directors. Remains active.)		Active

=== Series 22 ===
Episode	First aired	Entrepreneurs	Company or product name	Money requested (£)	Equity given %	Description of product	Investing dragons	Result after filming	Website	Fate
Episode 1	9 January 2025	Joseph Keegan	BodyXcore	105,000	37.5	Portable exercise equipment	Peter Jones, Touker Suleyman and Joe Wicks	Signed		Active
Episode 1	9 January 2025	Emma Burke	Laceeze	50,000	40 (Drops to 30% if investment is repaid within 12 months.)	Aid for tightening shoelaces	Touker Suleyman	Unclear (Note: Laceeze has had some press reports indicating Suleyman remains involved with the company, however Burke has not commented on the status of investment. Remains active.)		Active
Episode 2	16 January 2025	Luke and Owen Buckmaster	Doughboys Pizza	90,000	10	Frozen pizzas	Peter Jones	Failed (Note: Doughboys Pizza has not shown indication of the investment going through. They appear to have instead entered into an agreement with a business cashflow lender. Remains active.)		Active
Episode 2	16 January 2025	Aaron Morris and Zara Paul	Choppity	100,000	15 (Drops to 12.5% upon investment being repaid)	AI video editing software	Peter Jones	Failed (Note: Choppity stated that shortly after filming a mutual decision was made with Jones not to accept his investment. Remains active.)		Active
Episode 2	16 January 2025	Alex Street	Mystery Jersey King	50,000	15 (Drops to 10% if investment is repaid within 18 months)	Random football shirts on a monthly subscription	Sara Davies	Signed		Active
Episode 3	23 January 2025	Yanna Smaglo	Nenya	80,000	20	Ukrainian fashion brand	Steven Bartlett and Deborah Meaden	Signed		Active
Episode 3	23 January 2025	Susie Yau and Yan Ying	Dot Dot Bubble Tea	50,000	10	Bottled bubble tea	Steven Bartlett and Peter Jones	Failed (Note: Dot Dot Bubble Tea's investment does not appear to have completed. Neither party has commented on the investment since filming. Remains active.)		Active
Episode 4	30 January 2025	Laura Harnett	Seep	50,000	4	Plastic-free household cleaning solutions	Deborah Meaden and Trinny Woodall	Signed		Active
Episode 4	30 January 2025	Pete Anwyll	Karta bottle	50,000	33 (Anwyll also accepted a job offer from Bartlett as part of the conditions of the investment)	Water bottle used as a barbell jack	Steven Bartlett	Failed (Note: In August 2025, Karta bottle applied to voluntarily be struck-off the register with no record of Bartlett being listed as a shareholder or director. Dissolved by 2026.)		Dissolved (2026)
Episode 4	30 January 2025	Sin Teng-Tang (Sandy Tang)	Love Sum	50,000	20 (Drops to 10% upon investment being repaid)	Home-made dumplings	Peter Jones	Signed		Active
Episode 5	6 February 2025	Shiv Sivakumar and Guy Sandelowsky	Omni	75,000	2	Plant-based pet food	Steven Bartlett and Deborah Meaden	Signed		Active
Episode 5	6 February 2025	Will Little	Little’s	80,000	5	Flavoured instant coffee	Steven Bartlett	Signed		Active
Episode 6	13 February 2025	Henry Bartlam and Alexandra Hollingsworth	Dig	75,000	15	Plant bed delivery service	Sara Davies	Signed		Active
Episode 6	13 February 2025	Hayley Hanigan	Tiny Explorers	50,000	20	Baby equipment rental service	Sara Davies and Touker Suleyman	Signed		Active
Episode 6	13 February 2025	Del Currie	Spudos crisps	50,000	25	Gluten free and vegan crisps	Peter Jones and Deborah Meaden	Signed		Active
Episode 7 (Note: Episode 7 of series 22 was the first in the show's history to show less than 4 pitches.)	20 February 2025	Elliot Tanner	Stashed Products	100,000	7 (Drops to 4% upon investment being repaid)	Hook rack for bikes	Touker Suleyman	Unclear (Note: Stashed Products investment status remains unclear. Tanner has indicated that he was working with Suleyman following filming, however no there has been no mention of his investment since and appears to have progressed with a grant £25,000 from Powys County Council. Remains active.)		Active
Episode 7	20 February 2025	Brendon and Jaydon Manders	Lumberjaxe Food Company	90,000	20	Range of sauces and seasonings	Emma Grede	Signed		Active
Episode 8	27 February 2025	Antony and Lisa Hicks	Snoap HQ	50,000	7.5	Soap and shampoo dispenser from solid bars	Peter Jones and Deborah Meaden	Signed		Active
Episode 8	27 February 2025	James Cohen and Zak Marks	Kitt Medical	75,000	7	Medical kits for Anaphylaxis	Steven Bartlett and Deborah Meaden	Signed		Active
Episode 8	27 February 2025	Carla Saull	Good Wash Day	20,000	10	Hair towels that reduce friction, frizz and drying time	Sara Davies	Signed		Active
Episode 9	31 July 2025	Jonathan Penna	Azio Beauty	50,000 (with an additional 50,000 loan in the future)	5	Luxury skincare range	Touker Suleyman	Failed (Note: Azio Beauty's investment appears to have failed. Penna has indicated that whilst he has followed the advice Suleyman provided on camera, the company has since progressed without investment. Remains active.)		Active
Episode 9	31 July 2025	Omid Moallemi and David Parr	Prsnt	90,000	15 (Peter Jones and Touker Suleyman hold 5% each, whilst Sara Davies will hold 2.5%)	Smartphone app that sends gifts to phone contacts	Sara Davies, Peter Jones and Touker Suleyman	Signed (Note: Omid Moallemi has since posted his activity in working with Sara Davies, but does not appear to have signed with Peter Jones or Touker Suleyman. Remains active.)		Active
Episode 10	3 October 2025	Dr Samuel Bailey	Pippa Technologies	100,000 (received 150,000)	15	Temperature sensor for cooking hobs	Peter Jones, Deborah Meaden and Touker Suleyman	Unclear (Note: Pippa Technologies spoke positively of their time in the den, however there is no record of investment being made. Remains active.)		Active
Episode 10	3 October 2025	Bethan Higson and Alice Galsworthy	Mother Root Ginger	60,000 (received 90,000)	5	Non-alcoholic ginger infused aperitifs	Steven Bartlett	Signed		Active
Episode 10	3 October 2025	Phil Osband	Boot Bananas	200,000	32	Moisture-absorbing shoe deodorisers	Steven Bartlett and Peter Jones	Unclear (Note: Boot Bananas spoke positively of their time in the den, however there is no record of investment being made. Remains active.)		Active
Episode 11	9 October 2025	Amelia and Lydia Miller	Ivee Jobs	75,000	7.5	Recruitment agency for unemployed women	Steven Bartlett and Deborah Meaden	Signed		Active
Episode 12	16 October 2025	Francisco Gimenez	Yuv Beauty	250,000 (received £500,000. The largest sum of money received and highest valuation to date on the show.)	2	Range of hair-dyes	Steven Bartlett and Sara Davies	Unclear (Note: Yuv Beauty have not commented on the investment post-filming. There is no record of investment being made. Remains active.)		Active
Episode 13	23 October 2025	Reedah El Saie	Brainspark	10,000 (Received £30,000)	3	Digital education games	Sara Davies, Deborah Meaden and Touker Suleyman	Signed		Active
Episode 13	23 October 2025	Sophie Elmer and Rebecca Moule	MatesPlace	100,000	20	Residential app for mutual friends	Touker Suleyman	Failed (Note: MatesPlace's investment appears to have failed. The company has since had a compulsory strike off action discontinued since filming with no mention of Suleyman's investment. Remains active.)		Active
Episode 14	30 October 2025	Rajan Bhojwani	See The Tape	35,000	40	Visual aid for sellotape peeling	Steven Bartlett	Unclear (Note: See The Tape spoke positively of their time in the den, however there is no record of investment being made. Remains active.)		Active
Episode 14	30 October 2025	Andy Aitken and Joshua Mihill	Honest Mobile	110,000 (received £165,000. Bartlett invests £110,000, Meaden invests £65,000)	4.5 (Bartlett owns 3%, Meaden owns 1.5%)	eSim mobile phone network searches	Steven Bartlett and Deborah Meaden	Unclear (Note: Honest Mobile spoke positively of their time in the den, however there is no record of investment being made. Remains active.)		Active
Episode 14	30 October 2025	Simon Sansome	Snowball Community	80,000	25	Comparison and review app for accessability in facilities	All five dragons	Signed		Active

=== Series 23 ===
Episode	First aired	Entrepreneur(s)	Company or product name	Money requested (£)	Equity Given %	Description of product	Investing Dragon(s)	Result After Filming	Website	Fate
Episode 1	29 January 2026	Chloe Messer	Hat n Spicy	50,000	30	Up-cycled party hats	Peter Jones and Touker Suleyman	Failed (Note: Hat n Spicy's investment appears to have failed. Neither party has since commented on the investment. Messer's 2023 interview with Peter Jones' inaugural solo dragons den investment, Wonderland Magazine, may have caused conflict in suggesting that he already had contact with her prior to filming. Remains active.)		Active
Episode 1	29 January 2026	Murad Huseynov	Mosiac Journal	70,000	15	Photo album printing of online photos	Steven Bartlett	TBC		Active
Episode 1	29 January 2026	Gulshen Bano	Strike Back Self Defence	25,000	10	Self-defence classes for women	Jenna Meek	Signed		Active
Episode 2	5 February 2026	Danielle Close	My Skin Feels	50,000	20	Skincare made from food waste	Deborah Meaden and Gary Neville	Failed (Note: Danielle Close stated that 5 weeks following filming Meaden nor Neville responded to her attempts to connect, also denying reports from the Daily Mail that she had ‘returned’ Neville’s £25,000 investment, insisting that she never received it. She subsequently accepted investment from 5 angel investors, achieving more than £50,000 and gave away less equity. Remains active.)		Active
Episode 2	5 February 2026	Benjamin and Natalia Reeves	Swish	80,000 (received 90,000)	10	Portable golf ball washer	Peter Jones, Gary Neville and Touker Suleyman	Signed (Note: Swish appear to have signed with Peter Jones, now selling through his company 'American Golf,' however Neville and Suleyman’s investment status is unclear. Remains active.)		Active
Episode 2	5 February 2026	Jinesh Vohra	Sprive	50,000	5	Mortgage comparison and rewarding app	Peter Jones, Deborah Meaden and Touker Suleyman	Failed (Note: Sprive did not proceed with the investment offer. A month after the episode was broadcast, Vohra stated in an interview that, following filming, he did not feel he needed the Dragons' support. He also appeared to express some distaste towards the Dragons' attitude towards making an investment. Remains active.)		Active
Episode 2	5 February 2026	Oliver and Tina Hallam	Flavour Bombs	50,000	25	Food seasonings shaped as globes	Peter Jones	TBC		Active
Episode 3	12 February 2026	Olivia and Tanyka Davson	Cubbi	50,000	10	Money-saving app for new parents	Susie Ma	Signed		Active
Episode 3	12 February 2026	Martin and Tomas Rosinski	OnlyCat	200,000	10	Microchip cat flap	Steven Bartlett	Signed		Active
Episode 4	19 February 2026	Roman Haghighat	Health & Holistics	100,000	30 (Reduces to 20% if investment is returned within 24 months)	Sea-moss-powered wellness brand	Steven Bartlett, Peter Jones and Tinie Tempah	TBC		Active
Episode 5	26 February 2026	Zaahirah Adam	Hati	150,000	30	Phone call-first dating app	Steven Bartlett	Failed (Note: Hati was dissolved less than 2 months after the episode broadcast, with no record of Bartlett having invested. Dissolved by 2026.)		Dissolved (2026)
Episode 5	26 February 2026	Sam Beaney	Kibu	65,000	20	Modular headphones for children	Peter Jones and Jenna Meek	TBC		Active
Episode 6	5 March 2026	Ben McGirr	Kompo	86,000	35	Countertop food composting gadget	Susie Ma	TBC		Active
Episode 6	5 March 2026	Helen and Philip Lord	Rehome	100,000	15	Second-hand kitchens, interiors and furniture	Deborah Meaden	TBC		Active
Episode 7	12 March 2026	Laura Murphy	Oatco Superfuel	50,000	15 (drops to 10% if investment is returned within two years)	Natural oat-based snacks and breakfast options	Steven Bartlett	TBC		Active
Episode 7	12 March 2026	Jamie and John O’Donnell	Screw Caddy	50,000	30	Screwdriver tool aid	Deborah Meaden	TBC		Active
Episode 7	12 March 2026	Rachel Williams	Albus & Flora	50,000	30 (drops to 25% if investment is returned within two years)	SPF-focused skincare brand	Touker Suleyman	TBC		Active
Episode 8	20 August 2026	Cicely Coop	Selkie	40,000	20	Powder based shampoo	Steven Bartlett, Peter Jones, Deborah Meaden and Jenna Meek	TBC		Active
Episode 8	20 August 2026	John Gray and Sean Robinson	Mr Swainstons	50,000	20 (drops to 12% when investment is returned)	Authentic traditional sweets	Jenna Meek	Signed		Active
Episode 8	20 August 2026	Louise Truman	Plotpackers	60,000 (received 120,000)	12	Group holidays provider	Steven Bartlett and Deborah Meaden	Signed		Active
Episode 9	27 August 2026	Chester Robinson	Raise Snacks	50,000	10	Nuts and seeds clusters	Steven Bartlett and Gary Neville	Unclear (Note: Raise Snacks's investment status is unclear. There is no record of the dragons being listed as shareholders or directors, however footballer Ian Wright listed as a shareholder indicates possible involvement from Gary Neville. Remains active.)		Active
Episode 9	27 August 2026	Cat and Honor Black, Nicole Muller	Maiden Cricket	50,000	25	Cricket kits designed for women	All five dragons	Failed (Note: Maiden Cricket declined the investment shortly after filming. They stated that they were not convinced that the dragons had the experience that was desired in the sector and felt the business could achieve more than their initial request of £50,000 elsewhere. Honor Black remains the youngest entrepreneur to achieve investment from five dragons. Remains active.)		Active
Episode 10	3 September 2026	Abilasha Bhohi	Moonji	75,000	30	Dairy-free ice cream brand	Peter Jones and Tinie Tempah	TBC		Active
Episode 11	10 September 2026	Glyn Richards	Fingagolf	30,000	30	Tabletop golf game	Peter Jones	Signed		Active
Episode 11	10 September 2026	Sam Mabley	Yes Friends	20,000	2	Fairtrade and organic clothing	Deborah Meaden	Signed		Active
Episode 11	10 September 2026	Eugene and Ivor Patterson	ReVibed Drinks	50,000	15	Range of sparkling drinks infused with superfood ingredients	Steven Bartlett	TBC		Active
Episode 12	17 September 2026	Imogen Royall and Matt Kenyon	Northern Pasta Co	50,000	10	British grown spelt pasta	Peter Jones and Deborah Meaden	TBC		Active
Episode 12	17 September 2026	Ben Beavers	SmartyPlants	50,000 (receives an additional 50,000 for an additional 5% should Beavers want it)	10	Smart plant sensor	Steven Bartlett	TBC		Active
Episode 12	17 September 2026	Bella Acland	Soul Kitchen	40,000	15	Plant-powered, gluten-free, and vegan soups	Susie Ma	Signed		Independent
Episode 13	24 September 2026	Lucy Bowes	Lucy & Lola	100,000	20 (Reduces to 15% upon investment being repaid)	Personalised pet portraits embroidered onto clothing	Steven Bartlett and Jenna Meek	TBC		Active
Episode 13	24 September 2026	Hazel McShane and Amber Probyn	PEEQUAL	100,000	5	Flat-pack women’s urinal	Deborah Meaden	Failed (Note: Peequal and Meaden mutually agreed not to proceed with investment following filming, opting to partner with investors who requested less equity. Remains active.)		Active
Episode 14	25 September 2026	Caleb Slater	Cards2Cash	50,000	33	Gift cards traded for cash and re-purchase	Steven Bartlett	TBC		Active
Episode 14	25 September 2026	Sarah de Vere-Drummond	Kip Hideaways	90,000	30	Curated collection of UK travel destinations	Peter Jones, Gary Neville and Touker Suleyman	Failed (Note: Kip Hideaways did not proceed with investment following filming. Sarah de Vere-Drummond stated that following her review of the business strategies having since become CEO, she felt uncomfortable releasing the equity offered. Remains active.)		Active
Episode 14	25 September 2026	Craig and Kasia Neilson	Fayre Play	200,000	30 (Reduces to 20% if revenue hits £4 million within 18 months)	Fairground games experiences	Touker Suleyman	TBC		Active

== Rejected investments ==
=== Series 21 ===
Episode	First aired	Entrepreneur(s)	Company or product name	Money offered (£)	Equity offered %	Description of product	Proposed Dragon(s)	Website	Fate
Episode 5	1 February 2024	Timothy Binnington and Daniella Binnington-Nessman	Manta Hair	240,000	24 / 33	Sensitive hair brushes range	Sara Davies, Peter Jones and Touker Suleyman (Note: Manta Hair rejected the offers of investment, deeming the equity requested to be too high. Remains active.)		Active
Episode 9	29 February 2024	Richard Marles	Park Life	150,000	30 / 20	Frisby style dog-biscuits	Peter Jones and Touker Suleyman (Note: Park Life rejected the offers of investment, deeming the equity requested to be high. Remains active.)		Active
Episode 11	14 March 2024	Bob Gokani	Ezidrops	30,000	30 (Reduces to 20% upon investment being repaid)	Eye and ear drop tool	Peter Jones and Touker Suleyman (Note: Ezidrops rejected the offers of investment, disagreeing with the dragon’s feedback on his overall strategies and refusing to part with more than 5%. Remains active.)		Active
Episode 12	21 March 2024	Peony Li	We Are Jude	100,000	3	Bladder supplements	Emma Grede, Peter Jones, and Deborah Meaden (Note: We Are Jude rejected the offers of investment, refusing to part with more than 1.5%. Remains active.)		Active

=== Series 22 ===
Episode	First aired	Entrepreneur(s)	Company or product name	Money offered (£)	Equity offered %	Description of product	Proposed Dragon(s)	Website	Fate
Episode 3	23 January 2025	Andrew Brownlie	Canine Dip and Dive	10,000	20	Swimming lessons for dogs	Sara Davies and Peter Jones (Note: Canine Dip and Dive rejected the offer of investment, refusing to part with more than 10%. Remains active.)		Active
Episode 6	13 February 2025	Trib Gosain and Reid Jacoby	The Gilley Umbrella	50,000	20	Watertight case for umbrellas	Peter Jones (Note: The Gilley Umbrella rejected the offer of investment, refusing to part with more than 5%. Remains active.)		Active

=== Series 23 ===
Episode	First aired	Entrepreneur(s)	Company or product name	Money requested (£)	Equity offered (%)	Description of product	dragons reaction	Website	Fate
Episode 03	12 February 2026	Richard Peter and Erica Pugh	Compoclosets	100,000	20	Portable composting toilet	Peter Jones (Note: Compoclosets rejected the offer of investment, deeming the equity requested to be too high, whilst also considering Jones’ admission that he did not have their desired contacts in the manufacturing of recreational vehicles. Remains active.)		Active
Episode 6	5 March 2026	Gordon Leatherdale	Natural & Noble and Dog by the Hob	100,000	40	Alcohol and cocktail-making kits and dog treat baking kits.	Peter Jones and Deborah Meaden (Note: Leatherdale rejected the offer of investment refusing to part with more than 30%. Both Jones and Meaden subsequently cited his uncomfortability at investment and declined to negotiate. Remains active.)		Active
Episode 13	24 September 2026	Temi Olugbenga and Ash Ringhus	Sylt Pickling	20,000	33.33	Liqueur for homemade pickles	Touker Suleyman (Note: Sylt Pickling rejected the offer of investment, deeming the equity requested to be too high. Remains active.)		Active

== Failed pitches ==
=== Series 21 ===
Episode	First aired	Entrepreneur(s)	Company or product name	Money requested (£)	Equity offered (%)	Description of product	Dragons' reaction	Website	Fate
Episode 2	11 January 2024	Dr Chanise Thompson and Shanett Thompson	Renter Score	50,000	15	Advisory services for mortgages based on rent paid	Renter Score's pitch failed due to the dragons’ belief that credit score websites offered more legacy and would quickly implement any differences noted. Steven Bartlett did however offer to advise the business for a short time. Dissolved by 2024.		Dissolved (2024)
Episode 2	11 January 2024	William Watt	Above Below	100,000	5	Tow raft for swimhiking rucksacks	Above Below's pitch failed due to Watt's difficulty in explaining his business model, whilst the dragons cited a lack of value in patenting and significant financial losses. Peter Jones overall summarised Watt's pitch as terrible. Remains active.		Active
Episode 3	18 January 2024	Billy Childs	BC Boots UK	100,000	10	Match worn and player issued football boots	BC Books UK's pitch failed due to the dragons citing low profits and belief that sports memorabilia of such value should have profits donated to charity. Gary Neville did however offer to advise the business for a short time. Remains active.		Active
Episode 4	25 January 2024	Daniel Westall and Naomi Walmsley	The Stone Age Company	40,000	20	Stone-age education and work shops	The Stone-Age Education's pitch failed due to the dragon's citing annual losses for 5 years and belief that they lacked the skills to run the business. Peter Jones however did offer to advise the business for a short time. Remains active.		Active
Episode 4	26 January 2024	Isaac Tambini	Pola Poles	50,000	15	Alternative to ice lollys	Pola Poles pitch failed due to the dragon's disbelief that the lollies would compete against bigger brands and that Tambini understood the market. Remains active.		Active
Episode 5	1 February 2024	Janani Prabhakaran	Unbaggeded	80,000	10	Luggage pick-up service	Unbaggeded's pitch failed due to the dragon's concern over the royalties of outsourcing baggage storage and low profit margins. Remains active.		Active
Episode 6	8 February 2024	William Hogge	The Inhaler Tailor	80,000	10	Protective cases for asthma inhalers	The Inhaler Tailor's pitch failed due to the dragon's concerns over Hogge's ability to create a manufacturing line so soon and lacked an innovative design. Touker Suleyman did however offer to advise the business on resourcing for a short time. Remains active.		Active
Episode 7	15 February 2024	Maria Antoniou	Chocolate Moments	50,000	20	Chocolate bar blended with crisps	Chocolate Moments’ pitch failed due to the dragons citing low profits and concerns over the packaging and niche market. Remains active.		Active
Episode 8	22 February 2024	Charlie Rudkin-Wilson	Müll Club	30,000	12	Plastic recycling scheme	Müll Club's pitch failed due to the dragon's concerns over profitability and lack of widespread opportunity to distribute. Remains active.		Active
Episode 8	22 February 2024	Shabbir Mookhtiar and Dinesh Patil	Cook My Grub (renamed ”Flavers”)	150,000	7	Gourmet ready meal app	Cook My Grub's pitch failed due to the dragons citing high losses and concerns that the company would not raise investment nor profit by the millions in a bid to compete. Company merged with Homecooks in 2024.		Sold (2024)
Episode 9	29 February 2024	Daniel Vajsabel	Meetini (We Are Spirits)	75,000	15	Electric built-in bar cargo bicycle	Meetini's pitch failed due to the dragons citing low sales, low profits and clashes of eco-friendly and non-eco friendly packaging. Dissolved by 2025.		Dissolved (2025)
Episode 10	7 March 2024	Danny, Ricky and Nick King	Goats of the Gorge	30,000	10	Goat milk skincare brand	Goats of the Gorge's pitch failed due to the dragons citing major competition and lack of vegan friendly ingredients. Remains active.		Active
Episode 10	7 March 2024	David Doughty and Barry Shanks	DD Aviation	75,000	5	Space travel	DD Aviation's pitch failed due to the dragons suggesting the company may already have the money asked for and concerns over the company depending on investors introducing them to wealthy customers only. Remains active.		Active
Episode 11	14 March 2024	Marietta Hickman	Cheeky Nibble	60,000	10	Free-from dessert-inspired granola	Cheeky Nibble's pitch failed due to the dragon's concerns over the direct to consumer sales strategy and citing a high level of sugar in the product. Remains active.		Active
Episode 12	21 March 2024	Nodar Babuadze and Nino Loladze	Automated shower cleaner	50,000	10	Automated cleaning system for showers	Automated shower cleaner's pitch failed due to the dragons citing the major installation cost would see customers prefer paying a cleaner. Remains active.		Active
Episode 13	28 March 2024	Stephen Keane	Audio Mag Media	75,000	10	Children's special needs educational magazine	Audio Mag Media's pitch failed due to the dragons citing Keane did not own the exclusive rights to the product's technology and lacked scalability. Remains active.		Active
Episode 13	28 March 2024	Abeer Iqbal	Remy Sleep	80,000	5	Bean bags/pods and weighted blankets	Remy Sleep's pitch failed due to the dragons citing averaging sales, concerns over Iqbal's digital marketing strategy and use of polystyrene. Company in liquidation as of 2025.		Liquidation (2025)
Episode 14	4 April 2024	Peter Taylor	Nidhogger Mead	80,000	5	Honey and mead infused alcohol beverages	Nidhogger Mead's pitch failed due to the dragon's concerns over wholesale margins leaving the company financially unstable and lacked mainstream scalability. Remains active.		Active
Episode 14	4 April 2024	Rich Baxter	Stomp It Foot Drum Kit (Note: Stomp It Foot Drum Kit was the only pitch to appear at a reduced length in this series.)	50,000	25	Foot operated drum-kit	Stomp It Foot Drum Kit's pitch failed due to the dragon's concerns over high competition from natural drum kits and lacking a scalable opportunity. Dissolved by 2024.		Dissolved (2024)
Episode 14	4 April 2024	Carrie and Tori	Nail Pad	60,000	35	Self-manicure aids	Nail Pads’ pitch failed due to the dragons citing over-expenditure on patents, high competition and the duo's requirement for excessive advice. Touker Suleyman did however offer to advise the business for a short time. Remains active.		Active
Episode 14	4 April 2024	Charlotte and Wesley Pierce	Wiggy	50,000	10	Natural vitamins and minerals alternative to viagra	Wiggy's pitch failed due to the dragons citing the duo's lack of knowledge on nutrition and struggle to dissolve the sachets. Remains active.		Active

=== Series 22 ===
Episode	First aired	Entrepreneur(s)	Company or product name	Money requested (£)	Equity offered (%)	Description of product	dragons reaction	Website	Fate
Episode 1	9 January 2025	Ashfaq and Issa Patel	Diso	100,000	2.5	Vegan and sugar free vitamin supplements	Diso's pitch failed due to the dragons citing difficulty in consuming the product and major net losses. Remains active.		Active
Episode 1	9 January 2025	Katriona Shovlin	Hen Weekend Chicken Boarding	40,000	20	Hotel for hens and ducks	Hen Weekend's pitch failed due to the dragons citing low profits and ease of replication. Remains active.		N/A
Episode 2	16 January 2025	Rachel and Holly Wisson-Brooks	The Chocolate Cocktail Club	80,000	8	Chocolate cocktail range	The Chocolate Cocktail Club's pitch failed due to the dragon's belief that the expenditure of opening more Central London venues would greatly affect the net profits. Remains active.		Active
Episode 3	23 January 2025	Paul Hernan	Vertebrae	100,000	10	All-in-one bathroom solution	Vertebrae's pitch failed due to the dragons citing the product did not save a notable amount of space, Hernan not being able to renew his expired patent and his 23-year struggle to get the product noticed. Touker Suleyman did however offer to advise the business for a short time. Remains active.		Active
Episode 4	30 January 2025	Lucie MacLeod	Hair Syrup	190,000	3	Pre-wash hair oils	Hair syrup’s pitch failed due to the dragon’s concerns that MacLeod did not understand how investments are repaid, subsequently seeing Suleyman withdraw his offer of 3% for 190,000 after she initially accepted. Macleod nonetheless reported a major growth in sales following her appearance. Remains active.		Active
Episode 5	6 February 2025	Birendra Khadka and Kelsang Sahak	Chakow	100,000	13	Bidet that saves on water	Chakow’s pitch failed due to the dragon’s citing high competition and lack of UK demand for the product. Remains active.		Active
Episode 5	6 February 2025	Faye Whitley and Jake Powell	Beevive	80,000	8	Supplements and gift packages for Bees	Beevive’s pitch failed due to the dragon’s belief that investment was not the right direction for the business whilst it pushed for an ethical approach. Meaden did however offer to advise the business. Remains active.		Active
Episode 7	20 February 2025	Nitya Dintakurti,	Unpause	100,000	2.5	Cooling aid for menopausal flushes	Unpause’s pitch failed due to the dragons citing high competition and low net profits, subsequently ridiculing the valuation. Touker Suleyman did however offer to aid marketing for a short time. Remains active.		Active
Episode 8	27 February 2025	Millie Flemington-Clare	Human Beauty	50,000	20	Range of cosmetics for disabilities	Human Beauty’s pitch failed due to the dragon’s citing low turnovers. Steven Bartlett, Peter Jones and Touker Suleyman did however offer to advise the business in distribution, marketing and supplies. Remains active.		Active
Episode 9	31 July 2025	Anshu Ahuja	DabbaDrop	100,000	3	South Asian meal with sustainability kits and zero waste takeaway	DabbaDrop's pitch failed due to the dragons citing a difficulty in the unique selling point except the dabba itself, downfall of profit margins, higher net losses, and ridiculing the valuation. Remains active.		Active
Episode 9	31 July 2025	Matt and Max Palfrey	Fidget-T	50,000	10	Fidget toys, bubble wrap, and T-shirts for neurodivergence people	Fidget-T's pitch failed due to the dragons citing that the business is more of a charity, the limitations of licensing the patents to some supermarkets, and ridiculing the valuation due to the business running at early stage. Remains active.		Active
Episode 10	2 October 2025	Liha Okunniwa and Abi Oyepitan	Liha Beauty	100,000	10	African botanical bodycare	Liha Beauty's pitch failed due to the dragons citing continuing net losses and belief that £100,000 would not be enough for the company to profit. Dissolved in 2019 but continues to trade independently.		Dissolved (2019)
Episode 11	9 October 2025	Christopher Roberts (appeared as Ranger Chris)	Dinomania Ltd	100,000	15	Educational dinosaur exhibitions	Dinomania's pitch failed due to the dragon’s concerns over whether Robert would meet his required turnover to return investment and what a dragon would contribute towards development. Remains active.		Active
Episode 11	9 October 2025	Samuel Fresco and Stephen Wildish	Notorious Nooch	100,000	20	Vegan seasonings and spices	Notorious Nooch's pitch failed due to the dragon’s citing the duo had another business as their primary focus and the vegan branding lacking visibility on the packaging. Remains active.		Active
Episode 11	9 October 2025	Andrew Telfer and Gillian Erskine	Wildstrong	40,000	10	Outdoor movement and strength classes	Wildstrong’s pitch failed due to the dragons citing low turnovers, high net losses and the duo not willing to focus on the business full time. Remains active.		Active
Episode 12	16 October 2025	Carolyn Asome and Phil Moore	L’hood	150,000	15	Bio-degradable head-wear	L’hood's pitch failed due to the dragon’s concerns over the RRP and possible long term investment return. Remains active.		Active
Episode 12	16 October 2025	Sarah Louise Fairburn	Imp and Maker	100,000	10	Personalised gift hampers	Imp and Maker's pitch failed due to the dragons citing Fairburn’s major net losses despite investing £1,000,000 into the business, subsequently advising her to reduce marketing expenses. Remains active.		Active
Episode 12	16 October 2025	Jay McGregor	Graceful Graves	70,000	10	Grave and cemetery maintenance service	Graceful Graves’ pitch failed due to the dragon’s uncomfortability at profiting from customers' grief and the cost of the monthly subscriptions. Remains active.		Active
Episode 13	23 October 2025	Andrew Bowers	North Wrestling	60,000	25	Pro-wrestling promotion	North Wrestling’s pitch failed due to the dragon’s belief that Bowers would need significantly more money to launch the business and were skeptical of demand in the United Kingdom. Remains active.		Active
Episode 13	23 October 2025	Fiona Ritchie	The Ink Balm	65,000	15	Vegan tattoo aftercare products	The Ink Balm’s pitch failed due to the dragons citing a lack of USP, and belief that Ritchie should directly approach tattoo shops to kickstart. Remains active.		Active
Episode 14	30 October 2025	Laura Grant and Stacey Green	Shades Dancewear	75,000	10	Ethnicity themed dance wear	Shades Dancewear’s pitch failed due to the dragon’s belief that the business would need more than £75,000 to launch and needed further funding before asking for investment. Remains active.		Active

=== Series 23 ===
Episode	First aired	Entrepreneurs	Company or product name	Money requested (£)	Equity offered (%)	Description of product	Dragons reaction	Website	Fate
Episode 1	29 January 2026	Joseph Henai and Karmen Gadi	The Original Teffly	100,000	2.5	Dairy-free drinks made from Teff	The Original Teffly’s pitch failed due to the dragons citing a lack of plant based uniqueness and concerns over the company’s previous fund-raising rounds. Remains active.		Active
Episode 03	12 February 2026	Kate and Louise	Craft & Crumb	Home baking kits	100,000	3	Craft & Crumb’s pitch failed due to the dragons ridiculing the valuation based on its net profits and advised them to cautiously expand before seeking investment. Dissolved by 2016 but continues to trade independently.		Dissolved (2016)
Episode 4	19 February 2026	Alex and Sean Brassill	JNCK Bakery	100,000	5	Low-sugar cookies	JNCK Bakery’s pitch failed due to the dragons citing high net losses and overall dissatisfaction with the taste and branding. Company in liquidation as of 2025.		Liquidation (2025)
Episode 4	19 February 2026	John McClarey	Business Fives Limited	50,000	5	Corporate charity events	Business Fives Limited’s pitch failed due to the dragons citing a lack of clarity on McClarey’s business model, seeing a division of profits to charity. Peter Jones did however offer to advise the business for a short time in relation to its charity donations. Remains active.		Active
Episode 4	19 February 2026	Rob Smith and Jo	Active Hands	75,000	5	Gripping aids for the disabled	Active Hands’ pitch failed due to the dragons citing the business as family run, subsequently believing an investor would disrupt the business model. Remains active.		Active
Episode 5	26 February 2026	James Martin	Glawning	60,000	10	Luxury cotton bell-tent awnings	Glawning’s pitch failed due to the dragons citing the main products Martin intended to sell were not yet developed and that the patent application was at an early stage. Remains active.		Active
Episode 5	26 February 2026	Connor Jordan and Harry Watmough	Club Cultured	50,000	3.5	Wellness fermented and pickled products	Club Cultured's pitch failed due to the dragons citing high net losses and concerns over Jordan and his partners facing dilution following investment. Remains active.		Active
Episode 6	5 March 2026	Catherine Fernando	Iyasu	50,000	20	Evo and vegan-friendly leather medical bags	Iyasu’s pitch failed due to the dragons citing high RRP, Fernando’s lack of marketing outside of the medical industry and concerns over her lack of confidence in the business’s future. Remains active.		Active
Episode 7	12 March 2026	Fred Parry	Chicken Rush	50,000	10	GPS-powered hide-and-seek game	Chicken Rush’s pitch failed due to the dragon’s concerns that the concept was niche for investment and needed to grow before achieving such. Jenna Meek did however offer to advise the business for a short time.Remains active.		Active
Episode 7	20 August 2026	Sanjay and Shashi Aggarwal	Spice Kitchen	75,000	5	Handcrafted spice blends and collections	Spice Kitchen's pitch failed due to the dragons belief that investment would mar the business as family run and would struggle with pressures of returning investment. Remains active.		Active
Episode 9	27 August 2026	Isabelle and Jason Richardson	Seal Stop	50,000	7	Water sealant for hosepipes	Seal stop’s investment failed due to the dragon’s citing a high RRP and niche market for the product. Deborah Meaden did however offer to introduce the product to prospective buyers and advise the business should they consider franchising. Remains active.		Active
Episode 9	27 August 2026	Nathan Murdoch	Street Arts Hire	60,000	10	Bespoke street artwork	Street Arts Hire’s pitch failed due to the dragon’s belief that the business was in need of advising as opposed to investment. Steven Bartlett offered to advise the business for a short time. Remains active.		Active
Episode 10	3 September 2026	David Hodgson and Will Willis	Zeno Wine	100,000	5	Alcohol-free wine	Zeno Wine’s pitch failed due to the dragon’s feeling a lack of convincing on the sales growth of non-alcoholic wine and concerns over the valuation. Remains active.		Active
Episode 10	3 September 2026	Tolu Farinto	Limitless Live	50,000	10	Music and events company	Limitless Live’s pitch failed due to the dragon’s citing Farinto’s reliance on sponsorship, lacking retainers from his clients and questioning the valuation. Remains active.		Active
Episode 10	3 September 2026	Cameron Clarke	ArrowHeadz	150,000	10	Darts retailer	ArrowHeadz’s pitch failed due to the dragons' concerns that Clarke would struggle with margins on manufacturers whilst operating in a retail store, whilst also citing his main focus on major darts players. Remains active.		Active
Episode 11	10 September 2026	Angus Cowen and Charlotte Dawe	Sea Sisters	75,000	5	Artisanal fish cannery	Sea Sisters’ pitch failed due to the dragon’s lacking an overall passion for the trade. Meaden immediately declined to invest due to her vegan diet. Remains active.		Active
Episode 12	17 September 2026	Rich Martin	The Air of the Dog	50,000	10	Inflatable pubs	The Air of The Dog’s pitch failed due to the dragons citing low turnovers and disagreeing with Martin’s proposed franchising model. Remains active.		Active
Episode 13	24 September 2026	John Jones	Rite Tackling	50,000	10	Fishing products	Rite Tackling’s pitch failed due to the dragon’s citing only £5,000 annual net profit and belief that Jones was better suited to remain running the business himself. Touker Suleyman offered to advise the business for a short time. Remains active.		Independent
Episode 14	25 September 2026	Dina Jogee (Al-Samawi)	Survival Fitness	100,000	20	Calisthenic fitness training for children	Survival Fitness’ pitch failed due to the dragon’s concerns over Dina’s proposed business model of moving from in-person training to a mobile app and lacked scalability based on her personal input. Remains active.		Active
