= Swimhiking =

Recreational outdoor activity

Swimhiking is a recreation activity which combines hiking and outdoor swimming. It has been conceived by Peter Hayes while hiking in the Lake District of England. When hiking and you arrive at a lake, you change into a swimming costume and put your clothes in a waterproof rucksack and swim across the lake. On the other side you change back into your hiking gear and continue hiking.
