= Greater Patagonian Trail =

The Greater Patagonian Trail is an unofficial long-distance path in Chile and Argentina created in 2014. It runs south from Santiago, Chile, for 3,000 km (1,850 mi), and crosses five regions of Patagonia: Central Andes, Alto Bío Bío, Andean Araucanía, Valdivian Forest, and Patagonia Aysén. Because the trail traverses remote areas of the Andes, lacks signposts, and the infrastructure is limited, this is a very challenging long-distance path. The trail is characterized by a great diversity and incorporates optional rafting routes.

== Patagonia ==
Patagonia is a sparsely populated region at the southern end of South America, shared by Argentina and Chile. The region comprises the southern section of the Andes Mountains, lakes, fjords, and glaciers in the west and the deserts to the east. Patagonia is bounded by the Pacific Ocean on the west, the Atlantic Ocean to the east, and many bodies of water that connect them like the Strait of Magellan, the Beagle Channel, and the Drake Passage to the south.

== See also ==
- Hiking in Chile
- Laguna Torre, Argentina
- Los Glaciares National Park
