= Wall tent =

A wall tent, also known as a canvas tent, outfitter tent, safari tent, or sheep herder tent is a type of tent that has four straight vertical walls that provide more headroom than traditional pyramid-shaped tents. Wall tents are typically made of a heavy canvas and are used by hunters because they can accommodate several people and their supplies. Wall tents are suitable as a four-season tent, as they are able to accommodate a wood stove. Wall tents are commonly used in Civil War reenactments, and, in recent years, have also become used for glamping. Frames may be either internal or external. Wall tents are sturdy, yet lightweight enough to carry and not difficult to set up.

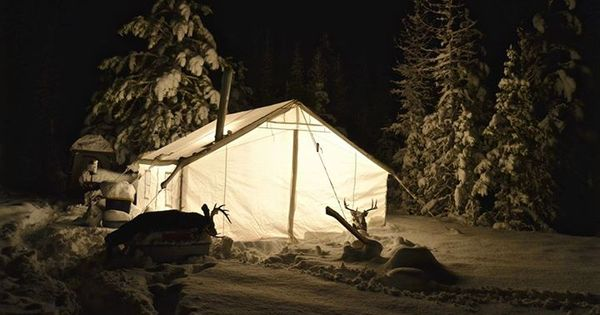
A wall tent in heavy snow

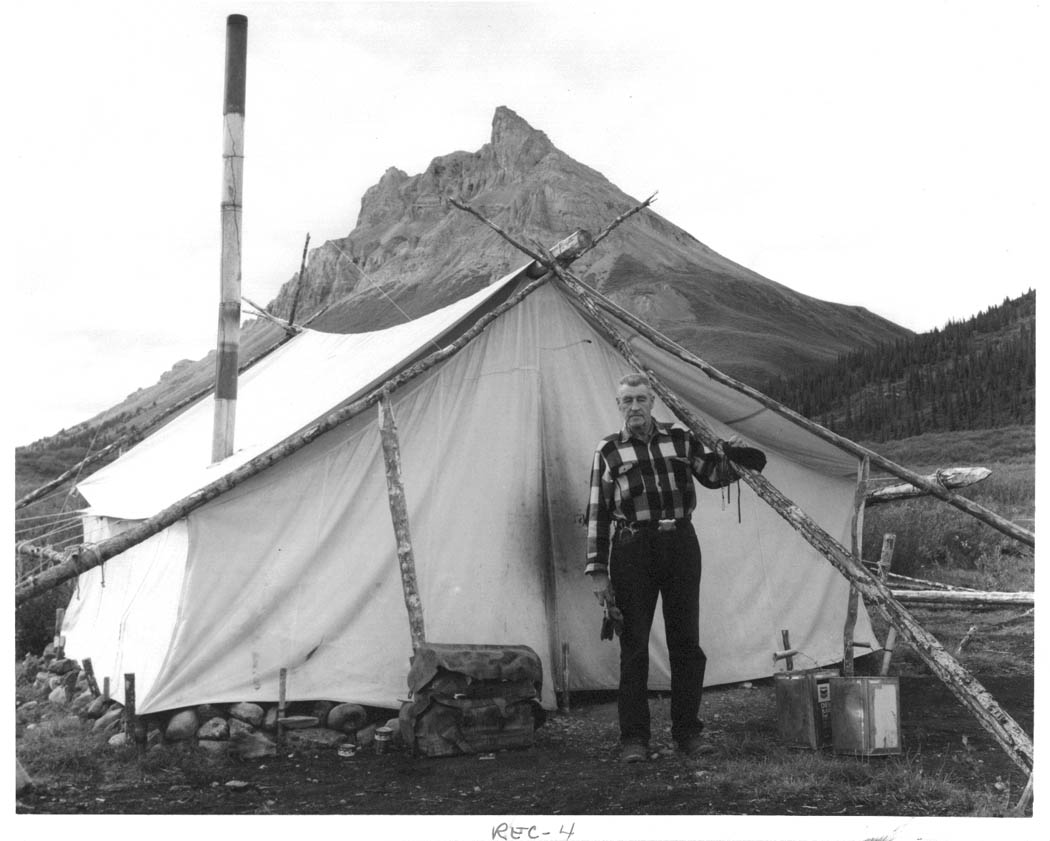
Wall tent used in Alaska

== History ==
Wall tents have been used for centuries. Paintings from 1544 illustrate wall tents with pavilions and wedges, a model of a wall tent from the mid-17th century can be found in a European museum, and there are drawings of wall tents being used in a military setting from 1740. Wall tents are known to have also been used by prospectors, trappers, and by soldiers during the civil war.

== Canvas Types ==
- Army Duck is a tightly woven cotton canvas that is durable and breathable.
- Blend is a mixture of cotton and synthetic material. Depending on the manufacturer, blend tents can be just as strong and breathable as traditional canvas.
- Polyester is generally lighter and less subject to rot and mildew. Durability and breathability vary.

== Size ==
Although it is possible to make a wall tent of any size, common sizes range from 8x10 to 16x24 feet.

== Setup ==
It is recommended that wall tents be set up by two or three people. Tents with a sewn-in floor are typically harder to set up if they have internal frames.
