= Hilleberg =

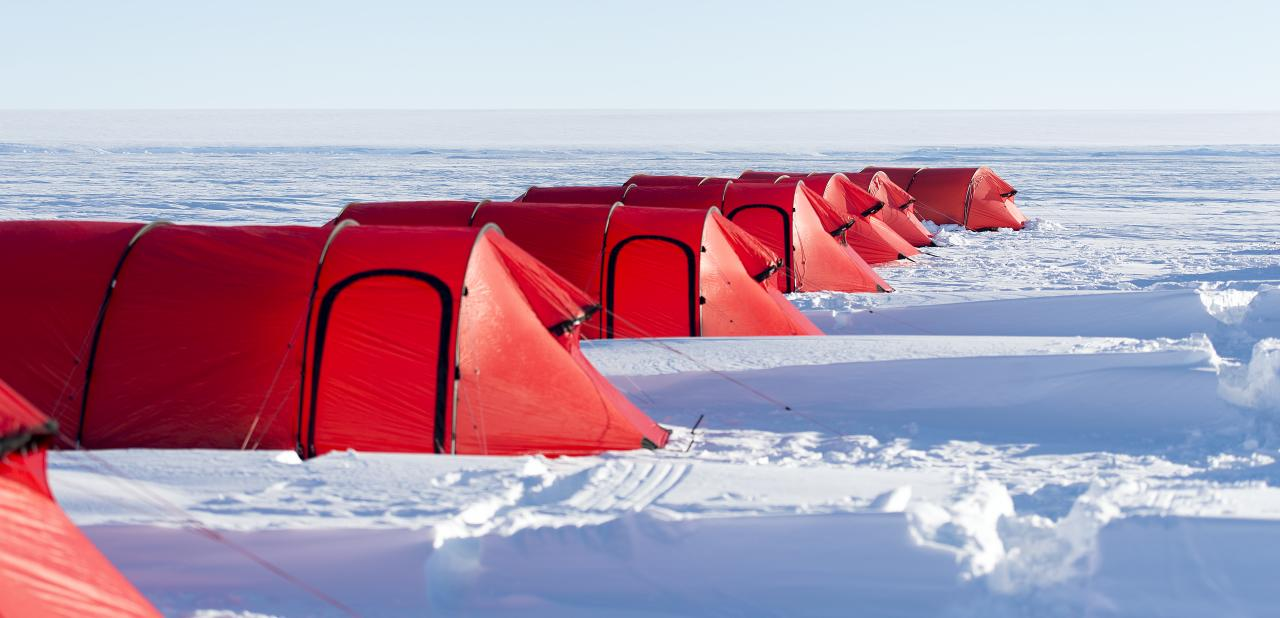
Hilleberg Keron GT tents in Gould Bay, Antarctica

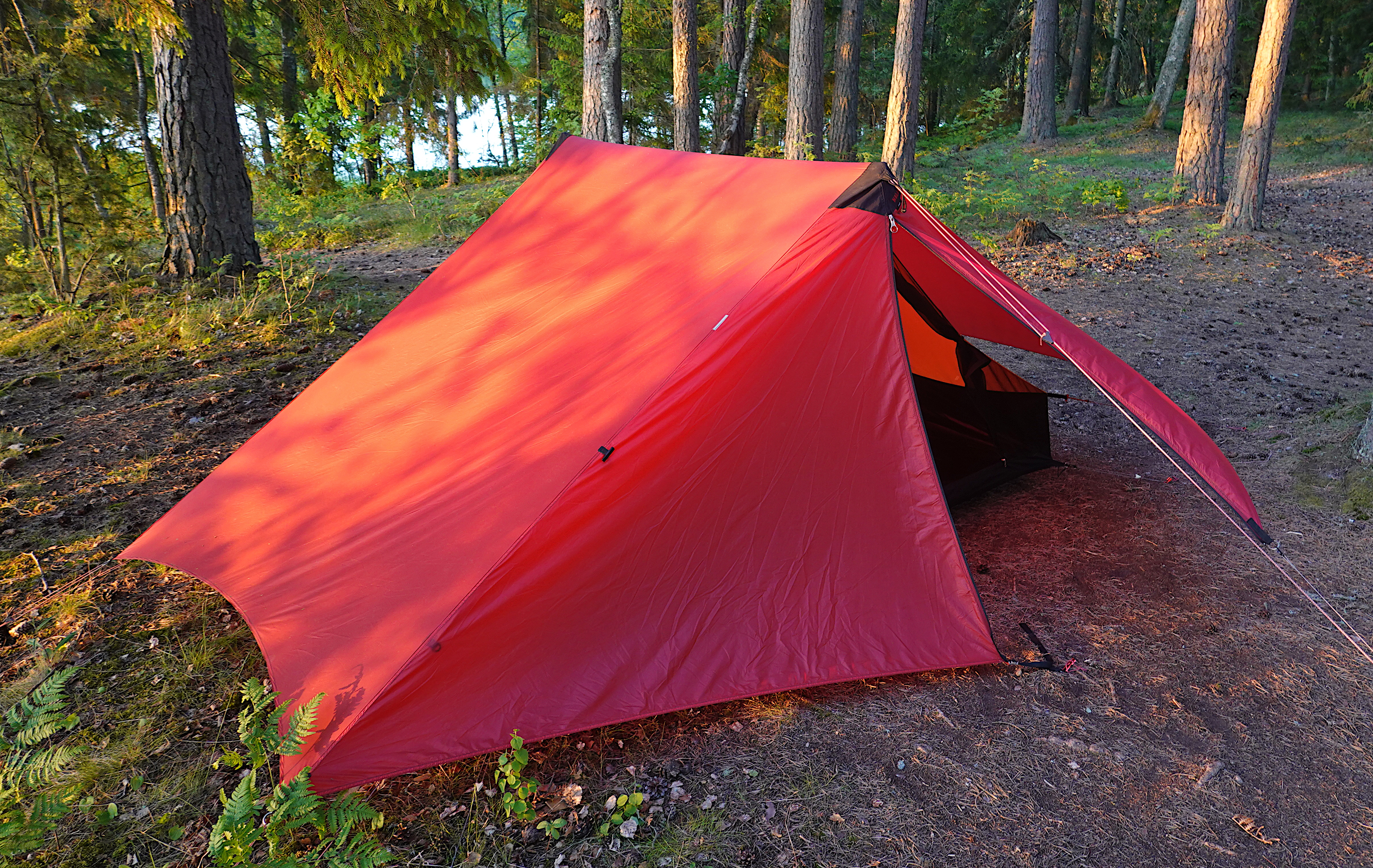
Hilleberg Anaris ridge tent, red, two person, three‑season, 1400 g without poles, purchased September 2020, pitched near Lake Gimmenesjön, Sweden

Hilleberg the Tentmaker is a Swedish tent-making company that was founded in 1971 by a husband and wife team, Bo and Renate Hilleberg. The company manufactures almost 40 different tent models of various designs and sizes, though production is focused on specialist lightweight tents at the premium end of the market. Their products have a reputation for excellent quality, durability, and design. In 2016, the founders’ daughter, Petra Hilleberg, took over as CEO of the Hilleberg Group.

In 1973, the company introduced the Keb, a double-wall tent where the inner tent and outer tent (or fly) were connected and so pitched simultaneously. In 1975, Hilleberg was the first company to use silicone-coated fabrics, rather than polyurethane coated ones, for their outer tents. Their flagship tent is the Keron tunnel tent, and other well-known tents are the Nammatj single vestibule tent, the Anjan lightweight tent, the Allak freestanding dome tent and the Akto single pole solo tunnel tent. Hilleberg tents are often used for exploration to harsh, remote locations such as the Arctic Circle, Greenland and Antarctica.

The company employed approximately 60 people in 3 countries as of 2018. Hilleberg's headquarters, Hilleberg AB, is located in Frösön, Sweden and manages product and material development as well as European sales. In 2000, Petra Hilleberg founded the US division, Hilleberg, Inc., based in Redmond, Washington, which is responsible for marketing and sales outside of Europe. She is the President of both the Swedish and US branches. Manufacturing is performed in Rapla, Estonia, under Hilleberg Eesti and other European subcontractors.

Today, Bo Hilleberg is the chairman of the board and senior advisor to the product development team of Hilleberg and he, Renate Hilleberg, their son Rolf Hilleberg, and Petra Hilleberg make up the governing board of directors. Petra was named an honoree of both the 2012 SGB (Sporting Goods Business) 40 Under 40 Awards by the SportsOneSource Group and the 2012 Puget Sound Business Journal 40 Under 40 Awards.
