= Pop up canopy =

Type of portable shelter

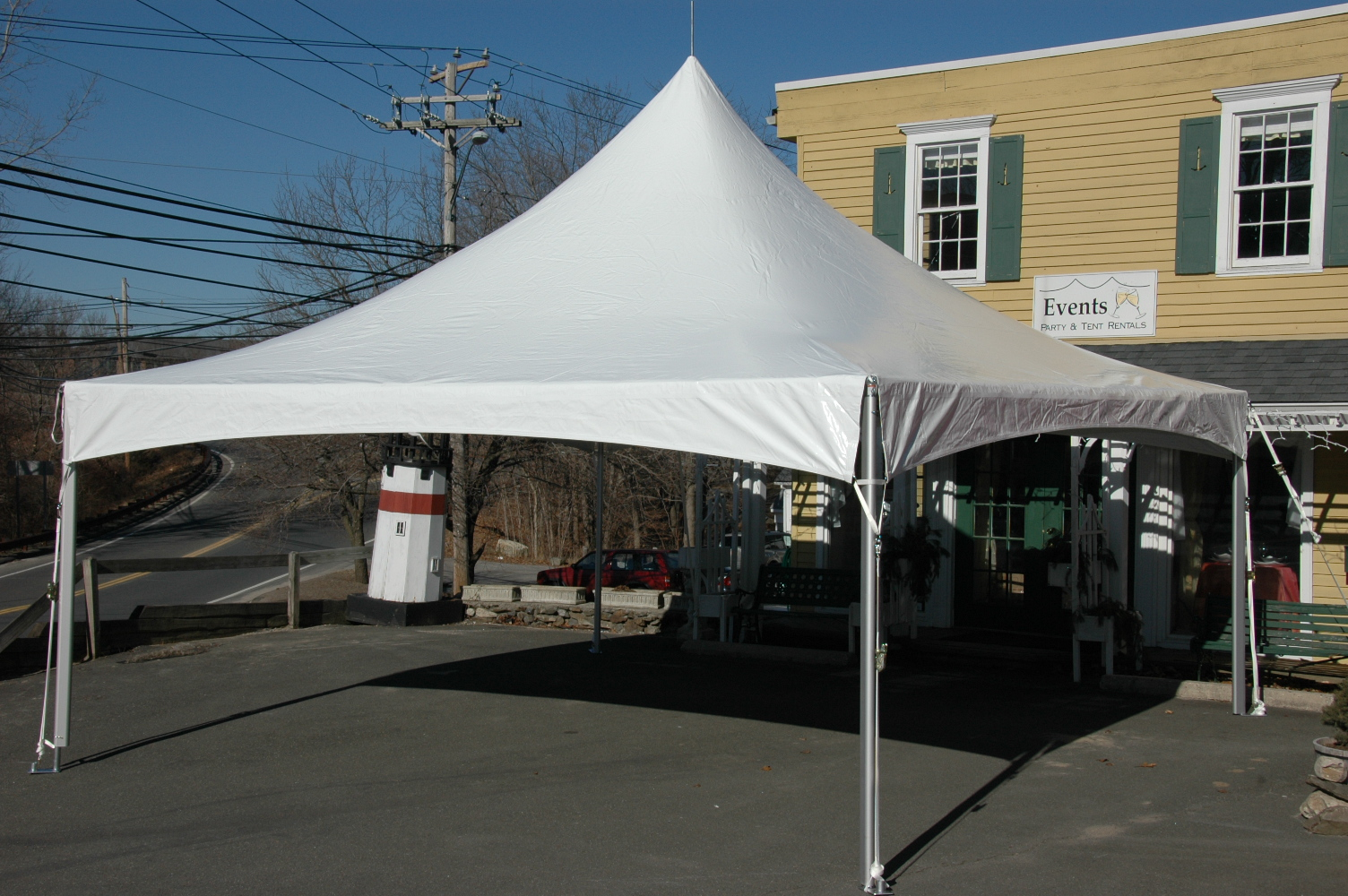
A pop-up canopy.

A pop-up canopy (or portable gazebo or frame tent in some countries) is a type of shelter that can be collapsed down into a size that is portable. Typically, canopies of this type come in sizes from 5 by 5 feet (1.5 by 1.5 m) to 10 by 10 feet (3 by 3 m). Larger or semi-permanent canopies are known as "marquees" or "pole marquees."

== History ==
Canopy-style tents and marquees have been used in many parts of the world since ancient times. Examples of ancient or traditional canopy tents include the chuppah, tipi, velarium, baldachin, and chum.

In the United States, prior to the 1940s, most portable tents were made of heavy-duty canvas held up by long wooden poles. These tents were heavy and bulky, which made them difficult to transport. In the 1940s and 50s, many synthetic materials were developed and used in mass-produced products for the first time. During this period, existing materials such as aluminum and fiberglass became easier to manufacture, while new materials like nylon and polyester–which are lighter, more durable, and more resistant to the elements than traditional materials—were developed and used in portable structures. Structures such as tents and canopies made with these lightweight materials became popular because they can be more durable and tend to be easier to transport and set up compared to structures made with traditional materials.

== Structure ==
Most pop-up canopies come in two pieces, the canopy frame and the canopy top. The canopy frame is typically constructed of either steel or aluminium. Steel framed canopies are heavier, stronger and typically cost less than aluminium frames. Recently, stainless steel has been used because it is lighter than steel, stronger than aluminium and, as aluminium, does not rust.

Tops for most canopies are made from a polyester fabric. High quality canopies come with a fabric that is UV resistant.

Most pop-up canopies are open-sided and without walls, distinguishing them from larger marquees or semi-permanent shelters.

== Uses ==
Pop up canopies are used for a wide variety of outdoor events. They have become very popular for sporting events, festivals and trade shows. In the context of amateur or semi-professional motorsport, they are sometimes called "pit tents."

Some commercial canopy companies add silk screen or digitally printed designs on the custom canopy tops to promote the company using them.

== Gallery ==
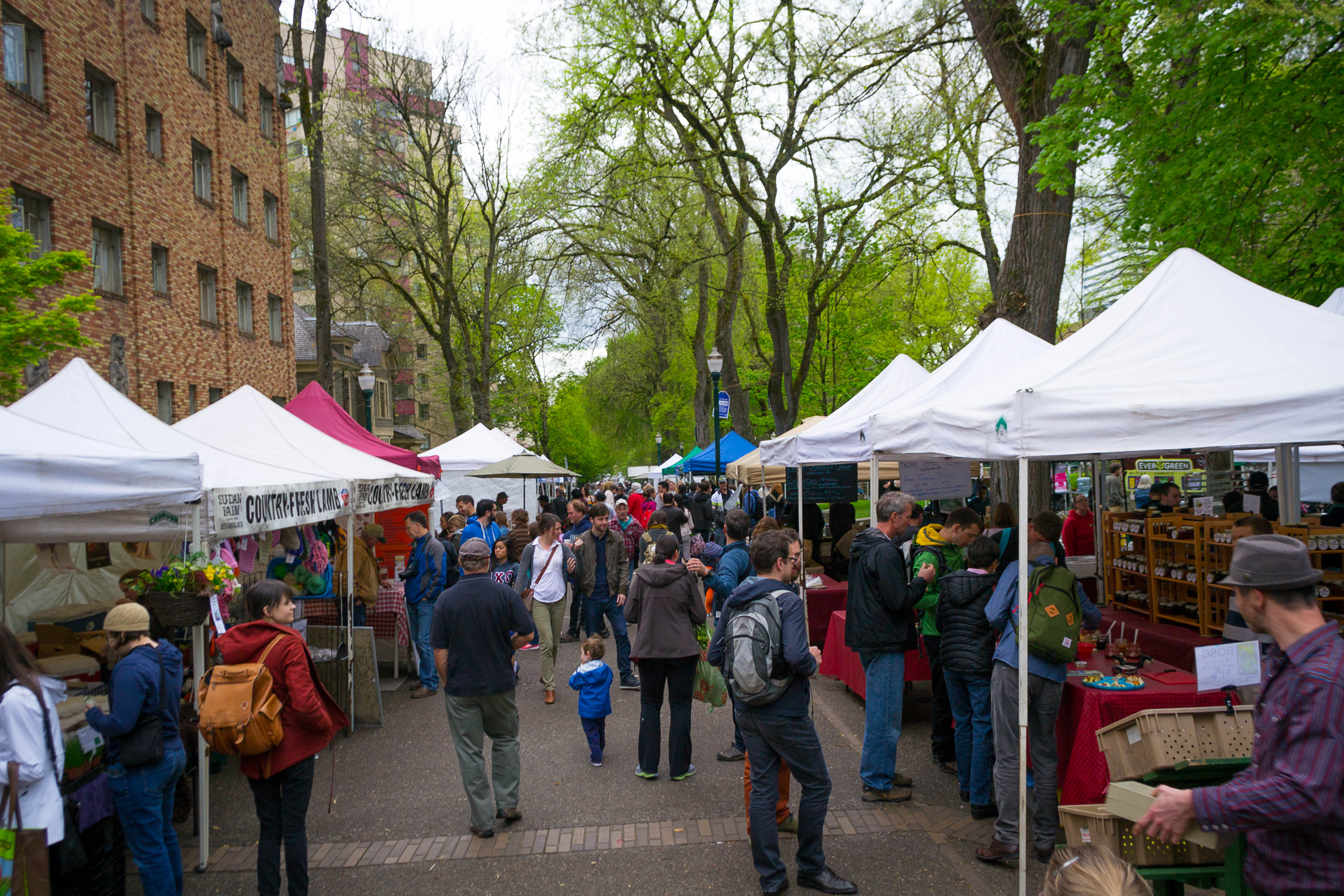
A number of frame tents at the Portland Farmers Market

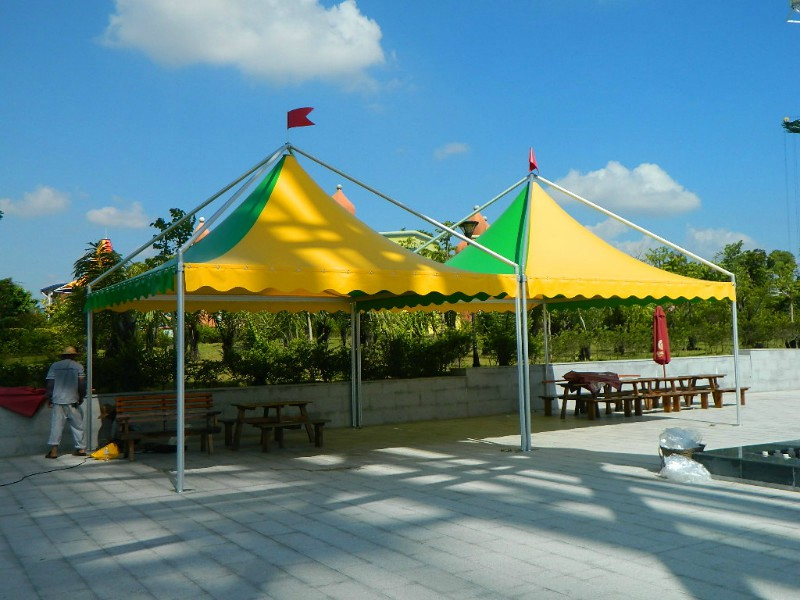
Frame tents made with PVC piping

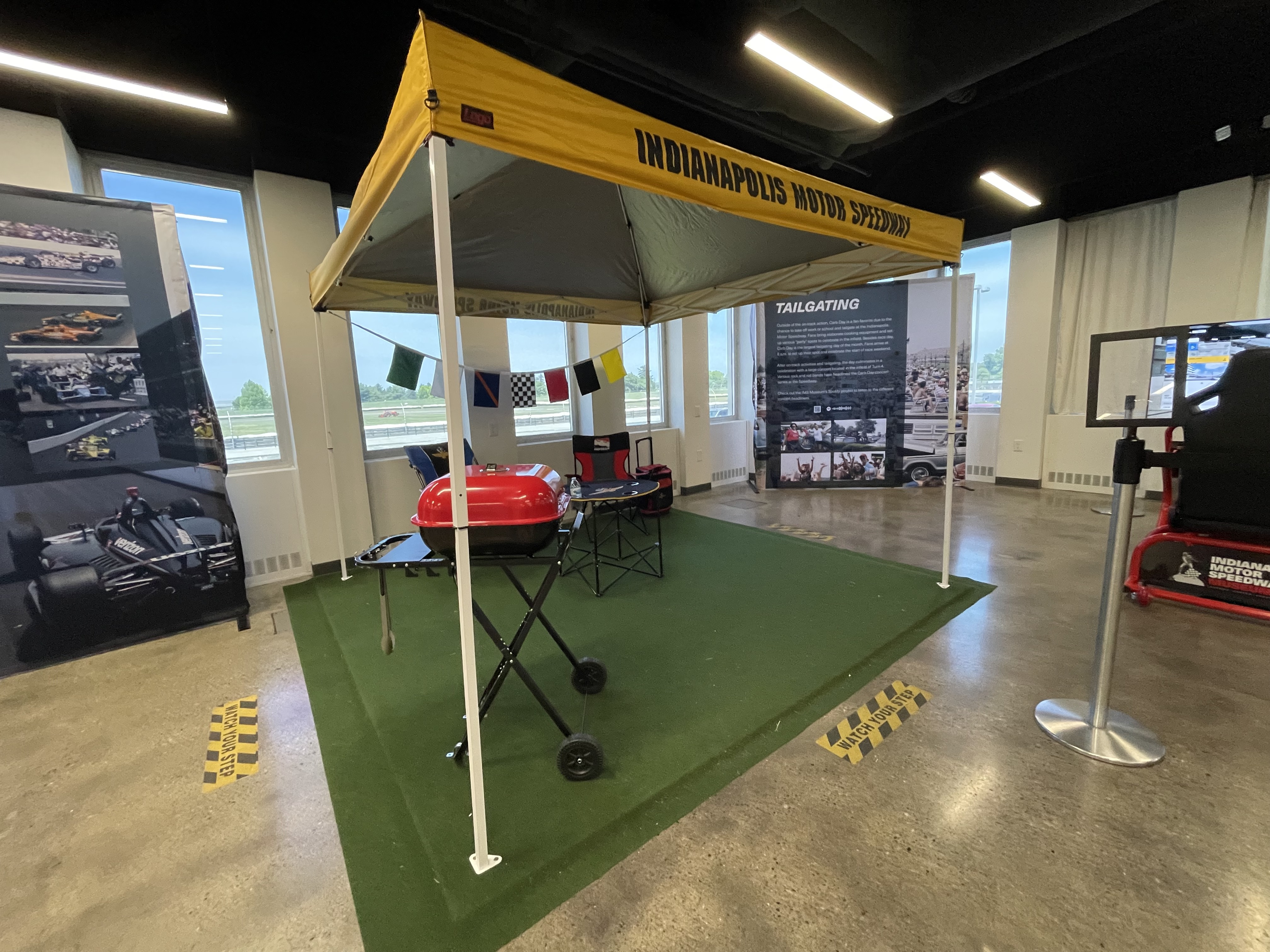
Frame tents are used at tailgate parties. This is a typical representation of one such tent, found in the Indianapolis Motor Speedway Museum.

== See also ==
- Aid station
- Bender tent
- Gazebo
- Popup camper
- Portable building
- Roof tent
- Wedding mandapa
