= Tent =

Temporary shelter which can be easily dismantled and which is portable

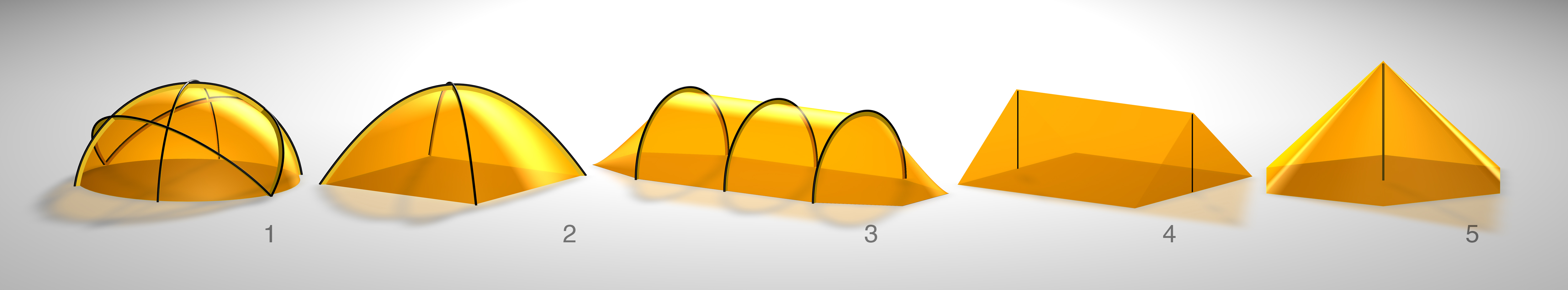
Typical modern tent styles for lightweight mobile use: 1. geodesic, 2. dome, 3. tunnel, 4. ridge, and 5. pyramid

A tent is a type of shelter, generally consisting of sheets of fabric supported by a frame of poles. Smaller tents may be free-standing or attached to the ground, while large ones are usually anchored using guy ropes tied to stakes or tent pegs. They range in size from those for one person to sleep in up to huge circus tents. Tents for recreational camping fall into two categories: those that can be carried by backpackers and those usually transported in a vehicle. Camping tents can usually be assembled or disassembled in 5 to 25 minutes.

First used as portable homes by nomads, tents are now more often used for recreational camping and as temporary shelters. Over the past decade, tents have also been increasingly linked with homelessness crises in the United States, Canada, and other regions. Places of multiple homeless people living in tents closely pitched or plotted near each other are often referred to as tent cities.

Nylon and polyester are common materials for tents as they are light and absorb less water than cotton, but are not necessarily waterproof fabrics. Camping tents are often outfitted with mosquito netting and flaps for ventilating humidity or smoke in those outfitted with kitchen capabilities. Some forms of tent, such as the pop-up canopy or slightly more robust pole marquee, provide light shelter from rain or sun, but are not used for camping.

== Overview ==
A tent is a shelter consisting of sheets of fabric or other material draped over or attached to a frame of poles (or a supporting rope). While smaller tents may be free-standing or attached to the ground, large tents are usually anchored using guy ropes tied to stakes or tent pegs.

Tents range in size from bivouac (bivy) structures, just big enough for one person to sleep in, up to huge circus tents that can seat thousands of people. Tents for recreational camping fall into two categories: those that can be carried by backpackers and those usually transported in a vehicle. Small tents may be sufficiently light that they can be carried for long distances on foot, a touring bicycle, or a boat. Larger, heavier tents are used for car camping. Assembling (pitching) and disassembling (striking) a tent takes a similar amount of time. Depending on tent size and individual experience, such tents can usually be pitched or struck in 5 to 25 minutes. Some very specialised tents have spring-loaded poles and can be pitched in seconds, but take somewhat longer to take down and pack.

== History ==
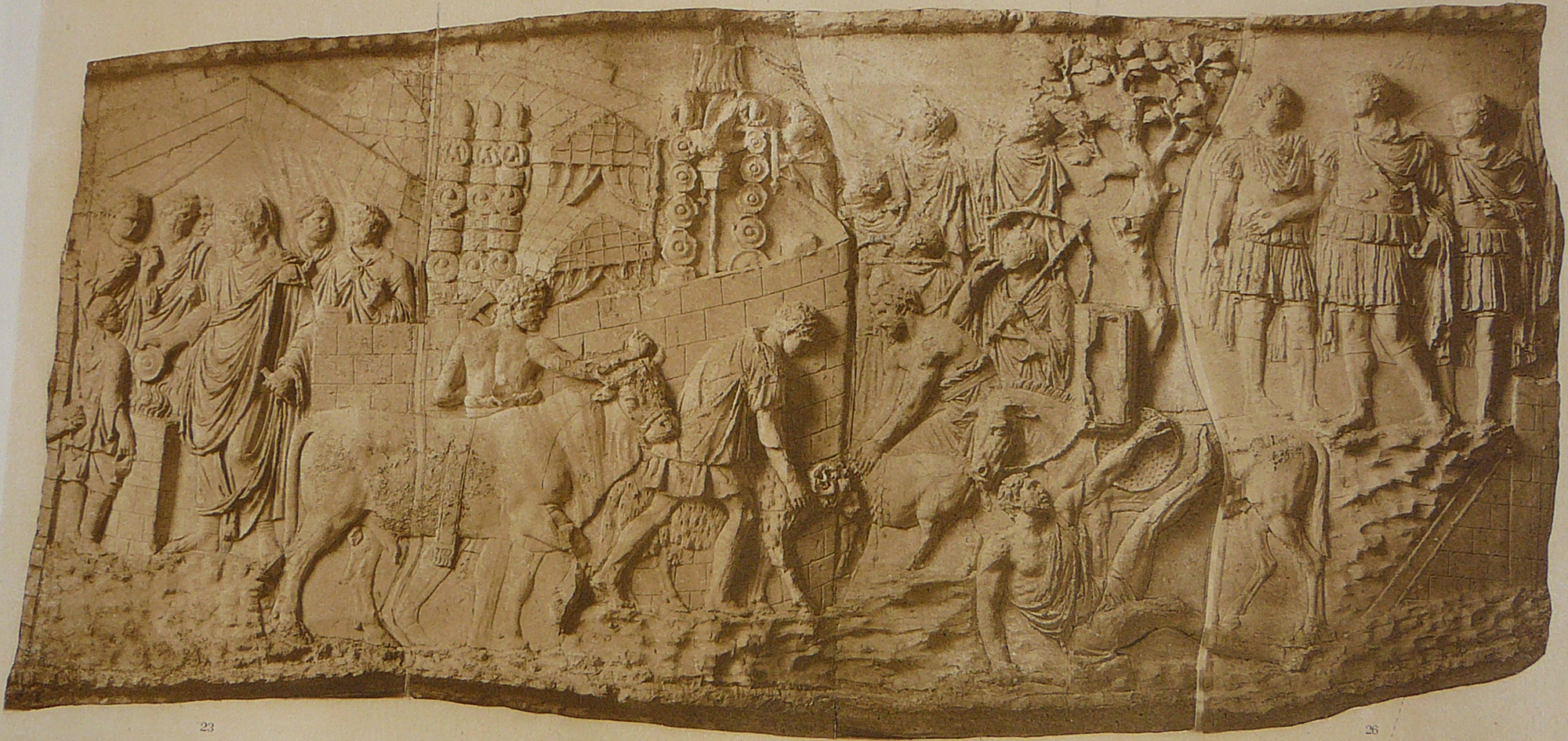
Roman Army leather tents (centre left), as depicted on Trajan's Column in Rome (photo of plaster casts)

A form of tent called a teepee or tipi, noted for its cone shape and peak smoke hole, was used by Native American tribes and Aboriginal Canadians of the Plains Indians since ancient times, variously estimated from 10,000 to 4,000 years BC.

Tents were used at least as far back as the early Iron Age. They are mentioned in the Bible; for example, in Genesis 4:20 Jabal is described as "the first to live in tents and raise sheep and goats". The Roman Army used leather tents, copies of which have been used successfully by modern re-enactors. Various styles developed over time, some derived from traditional nomadic tents, such as the yurt.

Most military tents throughout history were of a simple ridge design. The major technological advance was the use of linen or hemp canvas for the canopy versus leather for the Romans. The primary use of tents was still to provide portable shelter for a small number of men in the field.

By World War I larger designs were being deployed in rear areas to provide shelter for support activities and supplies. Four types of tents which can be characterized by their unique shapes are A-Frame tents, Pyramid tents, Hoop tents, and Dome tents. Tents tend not to be very spacious, given their ground surface area.

== Use ==
Tents are used as habitation by nomads, recreational campers, soldiers, and disaster victims. Pole marquees, a type of large tent are typically used as overhead shelter for festivals, weddings, backyard parties, corporate events, excavation (construction) covers, and industrial shelters.

=== Traditional ===
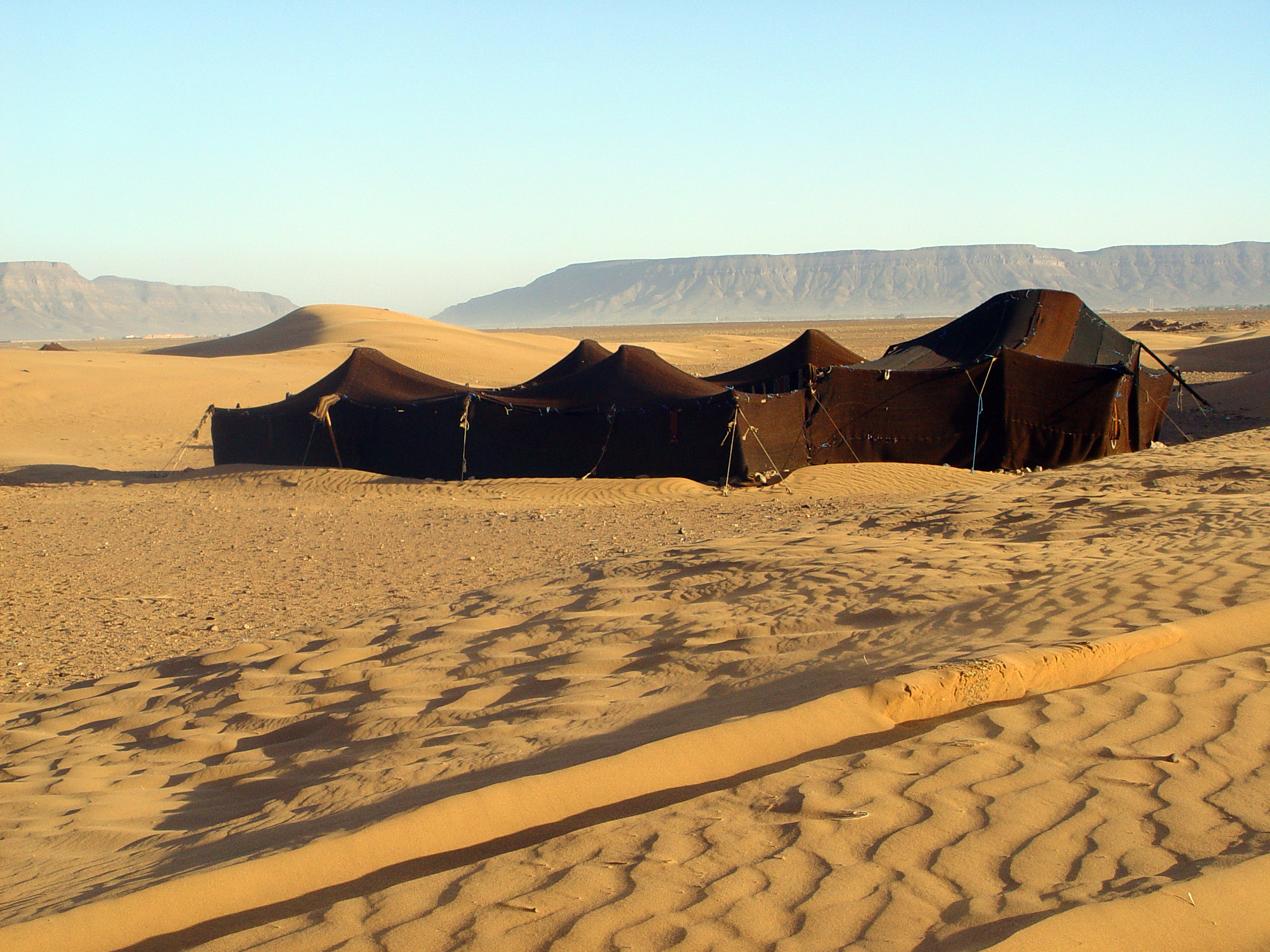
A Berber tent near Zagora, Morocco

Tents have traditionally been used by nomadic people all over the world, such as Native Americans, Mongolian, Turkic and Tibetan Nomads, and the Bedouin.

=== Military ===
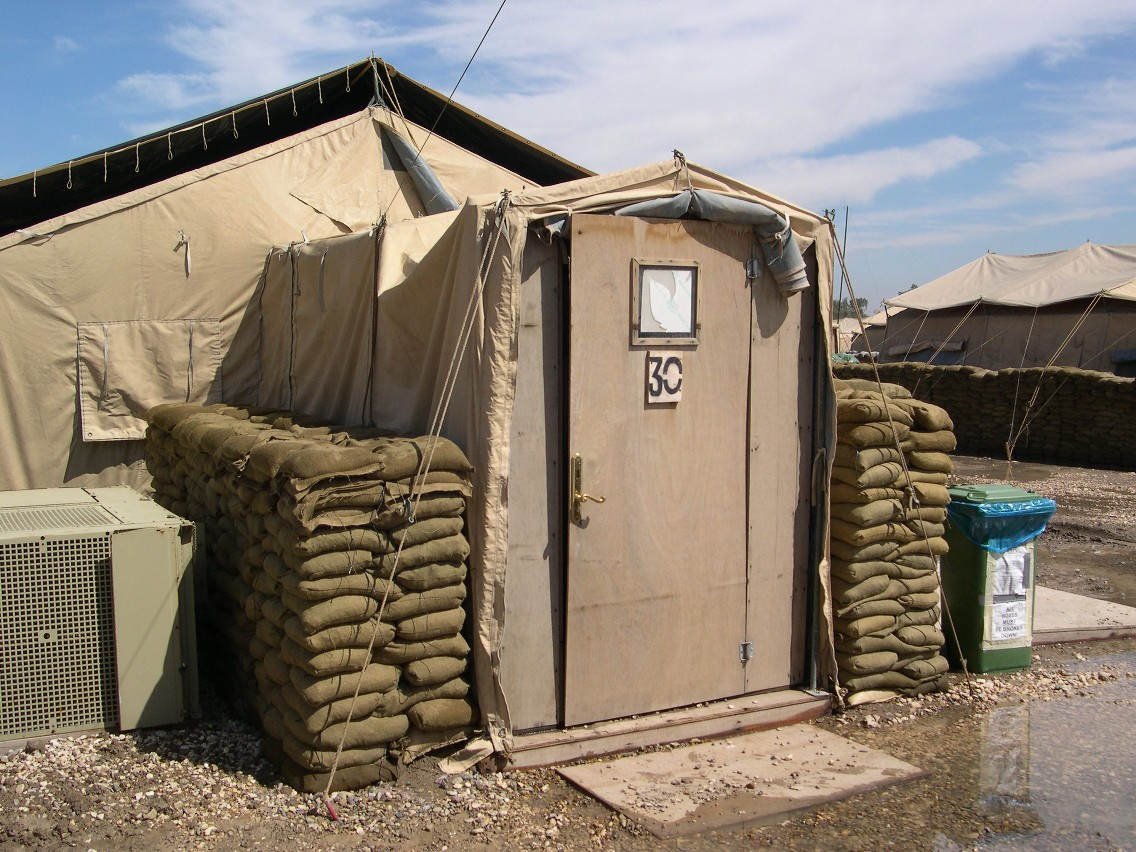
U.S. Army tent with constructed wooden entrance, air conditioner, and sandbags for protection. Victory Base, Baghdad, Iraq (April 2004).

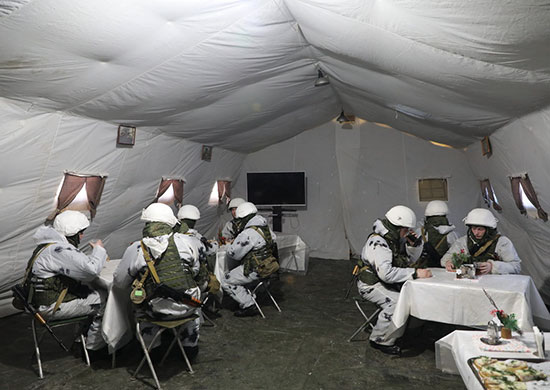
Insulated tent for heating personnel. Central military district. Siberia

Armies all over the world have long used tents as part of their working life. Tents are preferred by the military for their relatively quick setup and take down times, compared to more traditional shelters. One of the world's largest users of tents is the U.S. Department of Defense. The U.S. DoD has strict rules on tent quality and tent specifications. The most common tent uses for the military are temporary sleeping quarters (barracks); dining facilities (DFACs); field headquarters; morale, welfare, and recreation (MWR) facilities; and security checkpoints. One of the most popular military designs currently fielded is the TEMPER Tent, an acronym for Tent Expandable Modular PERsonnel. The United States Army is beginning to use a more modern tent called the deployable rapid assembly shelter or DRASH, a collapsible tent with provisions for air conditioning and heating.

=== Recreational ===
Camping is a popular form of recreation which often involves the use of tents. A tent is economical and practical because of its portability and low environmental impact. These qualities are necessary when used in the wilderness or backcountry.

=== Emergency ===
Tents are often used in humanitarian emergencies, such as war, earthquakes and fire. The primary choice of tents in humanitarian emergencies are canvas tents, because a cotton canvas tent allows functional breathability while serving the purpose of temporary shelter. Tents distributed by organisations such as UNHCR are made by various manufacturers, depending on the region where the tents are deployed, as well as depending on the purpose.

At times, however, these temporary shelters become a permanent or semi-permanent home, especially for displaced people living in refugee camps or shanty towns who can not return to their former home and for whom no replacement homes are made available.

==== Homelessness ====
Tents have been increasingly used as shelter for homeless people in the U.S., especially California, Oregon, and Washington. Encampments spiked in the mid-to-late 2010s. These tent cities housing many homeless and travelers/vagabonds are also commonly found in major cities in the South, including Austin, Texas, which had passed a restriction on homeless encampments in May 2021.

=== Protest movements ===
Tents are also often used as sites and symbols of protest over time. In 1968 Resurrection City saw hundreds of tents set up by anti-poverty campaigners in Washington D.C. In the 1970s and 1980s anti-nuclear peace camps spread across Europe and North America, with the largest women's-only camp to date set up outside the RAF Greenham Common United States airbase in Newbury, England to protest the deployment there of cruise missiles during the Cold War. The 1990s saw environmental protest camps as part of the campaign for the Clayoquot Sound in Canada and the roads protests in the UK. The first No Border Network camp was held in Strasbourg in 2002, becoming the first in a series of international camps that continue to be organised today. Other international camps of the 2000s include summit counter-mobilisations like Horizone at the Gleneagles G8 gathering in 2005 and the start of Camp for Climate Action in 2006. Since September 2011, the tent has been used as a symbol of the Occupy movement, an international protest movement which is primarily directed against economic and social inequality. Occupy protesters use tents to create camps in public places wherein they can form communities of open discussion and democratic action.

== General considerations ==
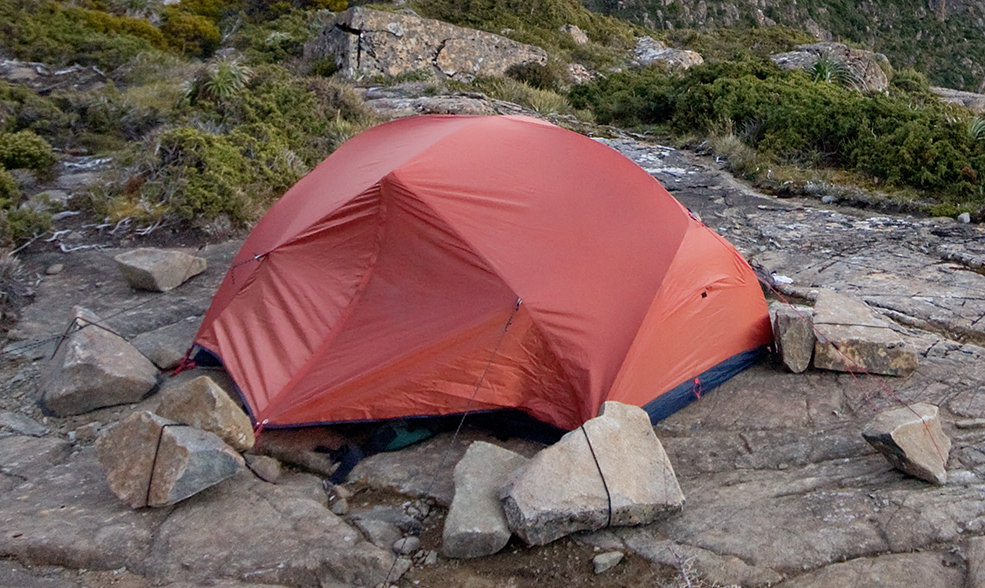
A modern two-person, lightweight hiking dome tent; it is tied to rocks as there is nowhere to drive stakes on this rock shelf

Generally, the interior of an enclosed tent is about 5.5°C (10 degrees Fahrenheit ) warmer than the outside environment (not accounting for wind chill), due to the retention of body heat and (to a lesser extent) radiation.

Tent fabric may be made of many materials including cotton (canvas), nylon, felt and polyester. Cotton absorbs water, so it can become very heavy when wet, but the associated swelling tends to block any minute holes so that wet cotton is more waterproof than dry cotton. Cotton tents were often treated with paraffin to enhance water resistance. Nylon and polyester are much lighter than cotton and do not absorb much water; with suitable coatings they can be very waterproof, but they tend to deteriorate over time due to a slow chemical breakdown caused by ultraviolet light. The most common treatments to make fabric waterproof are silicone impregnation or polyurethane coating. Since stitching makes tiny holes in a fabric seams are often sealed or taped to block these holes and maintain waterproofness, though in practice a carefully sewn seam can be waterproof.

Rain resistance is measured and expressed as hydrostatic head in millimetres (mm). This indicates the pressure of water needed to penetrate a fabric. Heavy or wind-driven rain has a higher pressure than light rain. Standing on a groundsheet increases the pressure on any water underneath. Fabric with a hydrostatic head rating of 1000 mm or less is best regarded as shower resistant, with 1500 mm being usually suitable for summer camping. Tents for year-round use generally have at least 2000 mm; expedition tents intended for extreme conditions are often rated at 3000 mm. Where quoted, groundsheets may be rated for 5000 mm or more.

Many tent manufacturers indicate capacity by such phrases as "3 berth" or "2 person". These numbers indicate how many people the manufacturer thinks can use the tent, though these numbers do not always allow for any personal belongings, such as luggage, inflatable mattresses, camp beds, cots, etc., nor do they always allow for people who are of above average height. Checking the quoted sizes of sleeping areas reveals that several manufacturers consider that a width of 150 cm (4.9 ft) is enough for three people; snug is the operative word. Experience indicates that camping may be more comfortable if the actual number of occupants is one or even two less than the manufacturer's suggestion, though different manufacturers have different standards for space requirement and there is no accepted standard.

Tent used in areas with biting insects often have their vent and door openings covered with fine-mesh netting.

Tents can be improvised using waterproof fabric, string, and sticks.

== List of traditional types ==
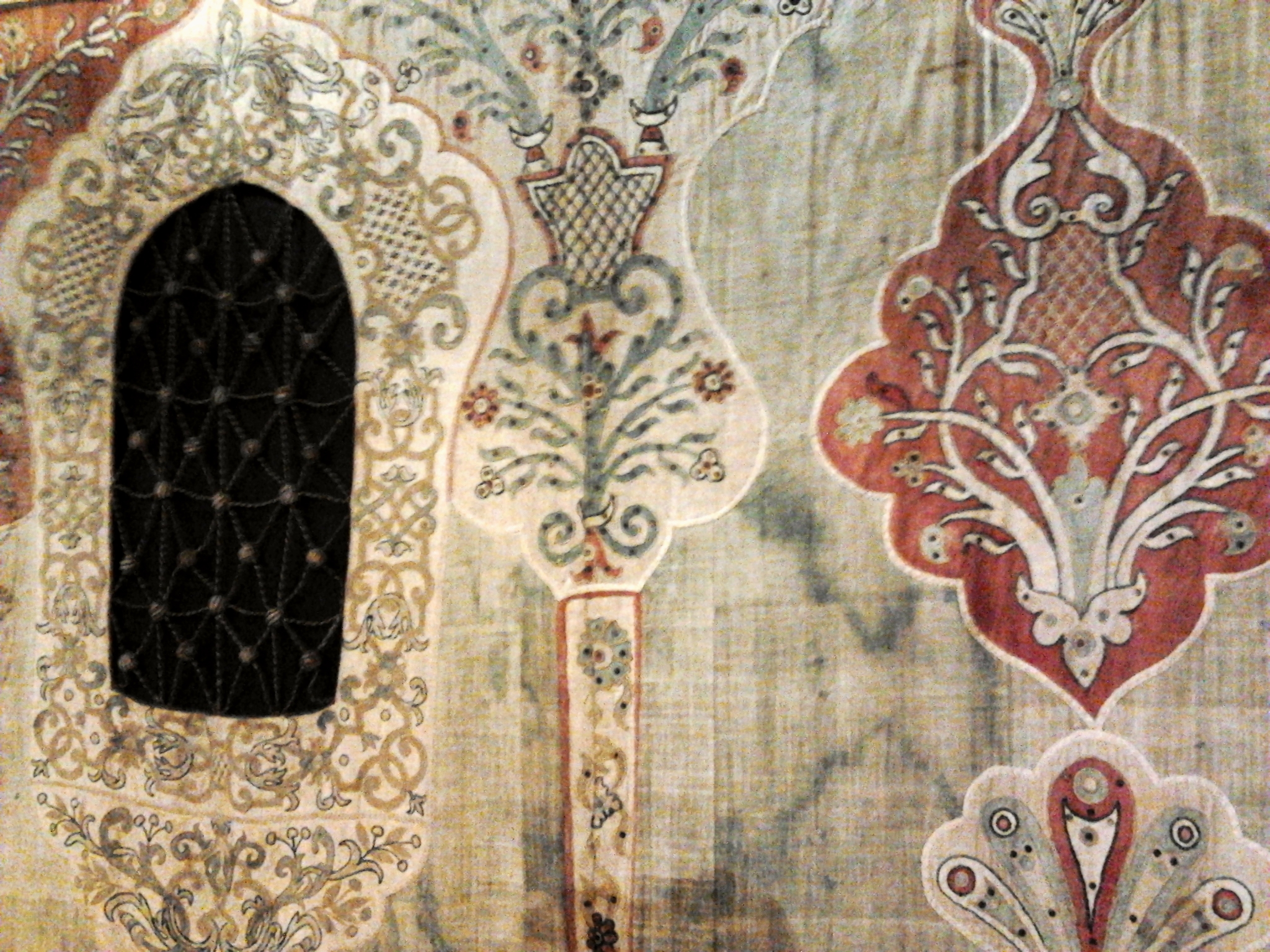
Detail of an early 18th-century tent in the District Museum in Tarnów in Poland, richly decorated in Muslim motifs and equipped with windows – an example of luxury tent-making for the Polish–Lithuanian Commonwealth's magnateria.

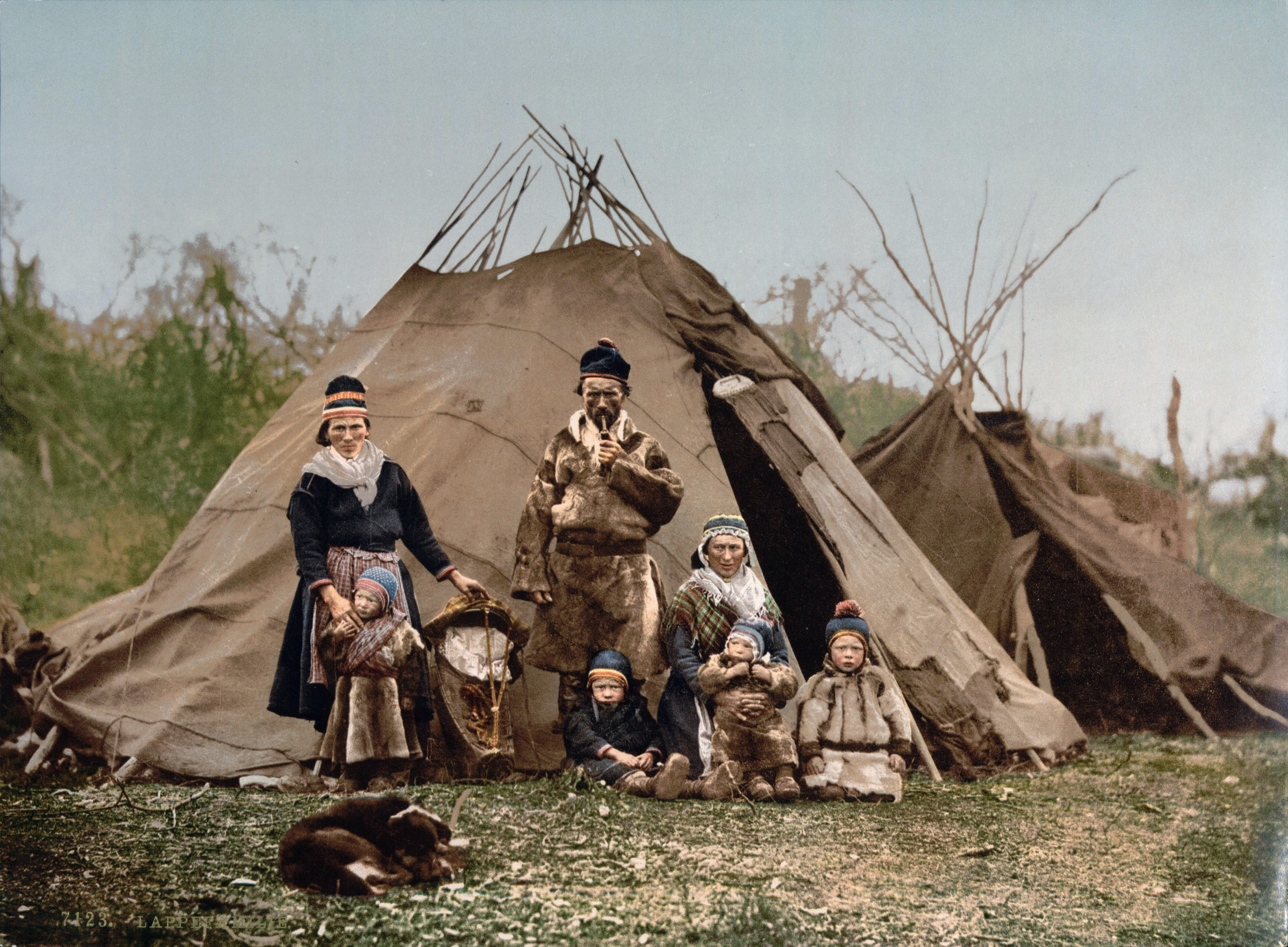
A Sami family in front of goahti. Photo was taken around 1900 in northern Scandinavia.

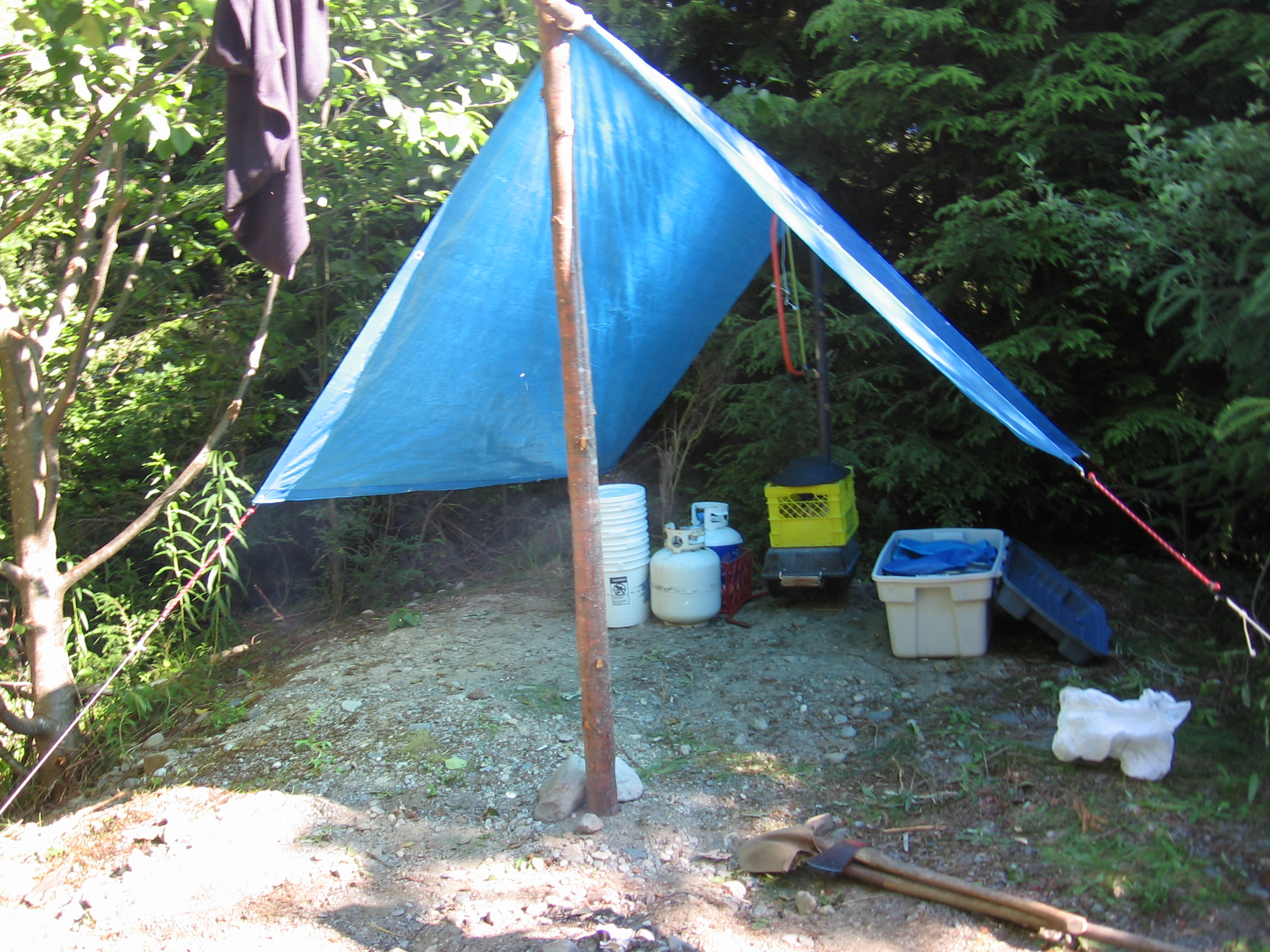
A simple tarp tent

- Bell tent, a conical tent design originating around 600AD.
- Berliner, an emergency Alpine bivouac
- Chum, a Siberian conical tent similar to North American tipi and the Nordic goahte and lavvu
- Fly
- Gazebo, a soft shelter with a roof but typically without walls
- Geteld, a conical tent used by the Anglo-Saxon in the 9th-13th centuries
- Gotthard, a Swiss tent used at high altitudes
- Goahti and Lavvu, two related kinds of Sámi tents using a conical design
- Kohte, an early 20th century German Scout conical tent design based on the tents of the Sámi people
- Loue
- Pandal
- Ridge tent or wall tent, blanket terms for the inverted V-frame design dating from prehistory to the present day
- Sarrasani, a large gathering tent reminiscent of the Sarrasani
- Sibley, a conical tent patented in 1856 and used by the US military before and during the American Civil War.
- Tarp tent
- Tipi, a conical design used by some indigenous peoples of North America
- Tupiq, a conical design used by the Inuit
- Wigwam and wikiup, an often bowed conical and dome tent of North America
- Whymper, a ridge tent used for mountaineering
- Yurt, a larger cousin of conical designs, with vertical walls and smaller pitch

== Parts ==
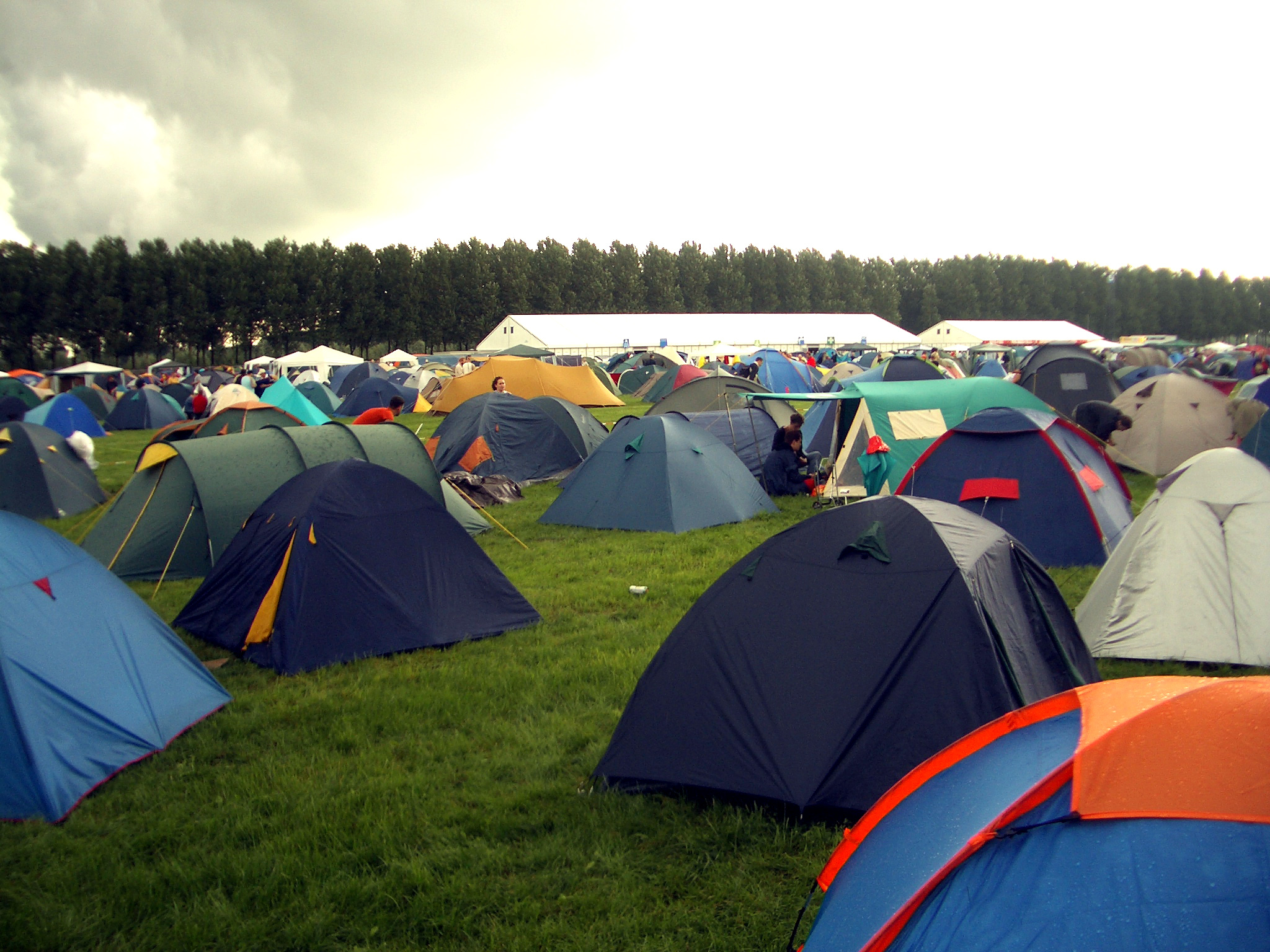
A variety of dome tents. Small dome and tunnel tents are the most popular tents amongst travellers due to their light weight and quick/easy placement

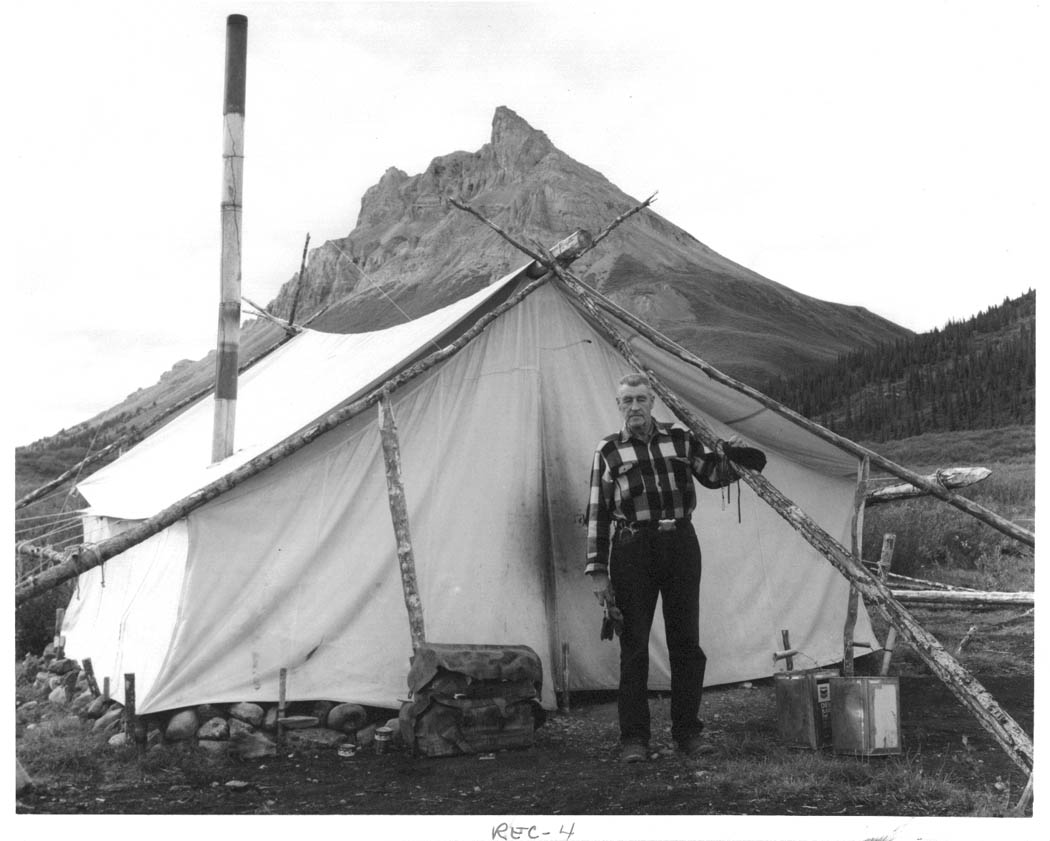
Junjik Valley man and wall tent. Picture from the U.S. Fish and Wildlife Service, July 1973

There are three basic configurations of tents, each of which may appear with many variations:

Single skin (USA: single wall): Only one waterproof layer of fabric is used, comprising at least roof and walls. To minimize condensation on the inside of the tent, some expedition tents use waterproof/breathable fabrics.

Single skin with flysheet: A waterproof flysheet or rain fly is suspended over and clear of the roof of the tent; it often overlaps the tent roof slightly, but does not extend down the sides or ends of the tent.

Double skin (USA: double wall): The outer tent is a waterproof layer which extends down to the ground all round. One or more 'inner tents' provide sleeping areas. The outer tent may be just a little larger than the inner tent, or it may be a lot larger and provide a covered living area separate from the sleeping area(s). An inner tent is not waterproof, but allows water vapour to pass through so that condensation occurs only on the exterior side. The double layer may also provide some thermal insulation. Either the outer skin or the inner skin may be the structural component, carrying the poles; the structural skin is always pitched first, though some tents are built with the outer and inner linked so that they are both pitched at the same time.

Components:

- A flysheet or rain fly (found only in double skin tents) is used to protect the actual tent from water. A flysheet is waterproof on the outside and also provides a surface to collect condensation on the inside, which then runs down to the ground. When a flysheet is used, it is important that there be no contact with the inner tent it is protecting; this keeps the inner dry. 'Expedition' tents often have extra poles to help ensure that wind does not blow the two layers into contact.
- The inner tent comprises the main living and sleeping area of the tent. For double skin tents, the inner tent (often mesh) is not waterproof since it is protected by the rain fly. For single skin tents, the inner tent is often made of waterproof-breathable material that prevents liquid water from penetrating the inside of the tent, but still allows water vapour to be transported out.
- The vestibule (they can be plural) is a floorless covered section located outside a tent entrance that is typically used for the storage of boots, packs, and other small equipment. Vestibules are often used for activities that are preferably not performed within the tent itself, such as cooking or equipment cleaning. Vestibules may be included as a removable attachment or integrated into the tent itself. Vestibule size varies considerably, ranging from extended areas with more surface than the inner tent down to practically nothing.
- A groundsheet is used to provide a waterproof barrier between the ground and a sleeping bag. With double skin tents, the inner tents normally have a sewn-in groundsheet, but a separate flat groundsheet may be provided for any living area. With single skin tents, the groundsheet may be sewn in or separate. Normal practice with sewn-in groundsheets is for the groundsheet to extend some 15 cm (5.9 in) up the lower part of the walls (sometimes called a 'bathtub' arrangement); this copes with a situation where water seeps under the side walls of the tent. Separate groundsheets allow load-sharing when backpacking, and may make it easier to pitch and strike a tent, but they provide less protection against insects etc. getting into the sleeping area; also, if any part of a separate groundsheet protrudes from under the side walls, then it provides a ready path for moisture to flow into the tent.
- The poles provide structural support. They may be collapsible for easier transport and storage. Some designs use rigid poles, typically made of metal, or sometimes wood. Other designs use semi-rigid poles, typically made of fiberglass, or sometimes of special metal alloys. Another pole type uses inflatable beams as the structural support. Some tents, particularly very lightweight models, actually use hiking poles as their structural supports.

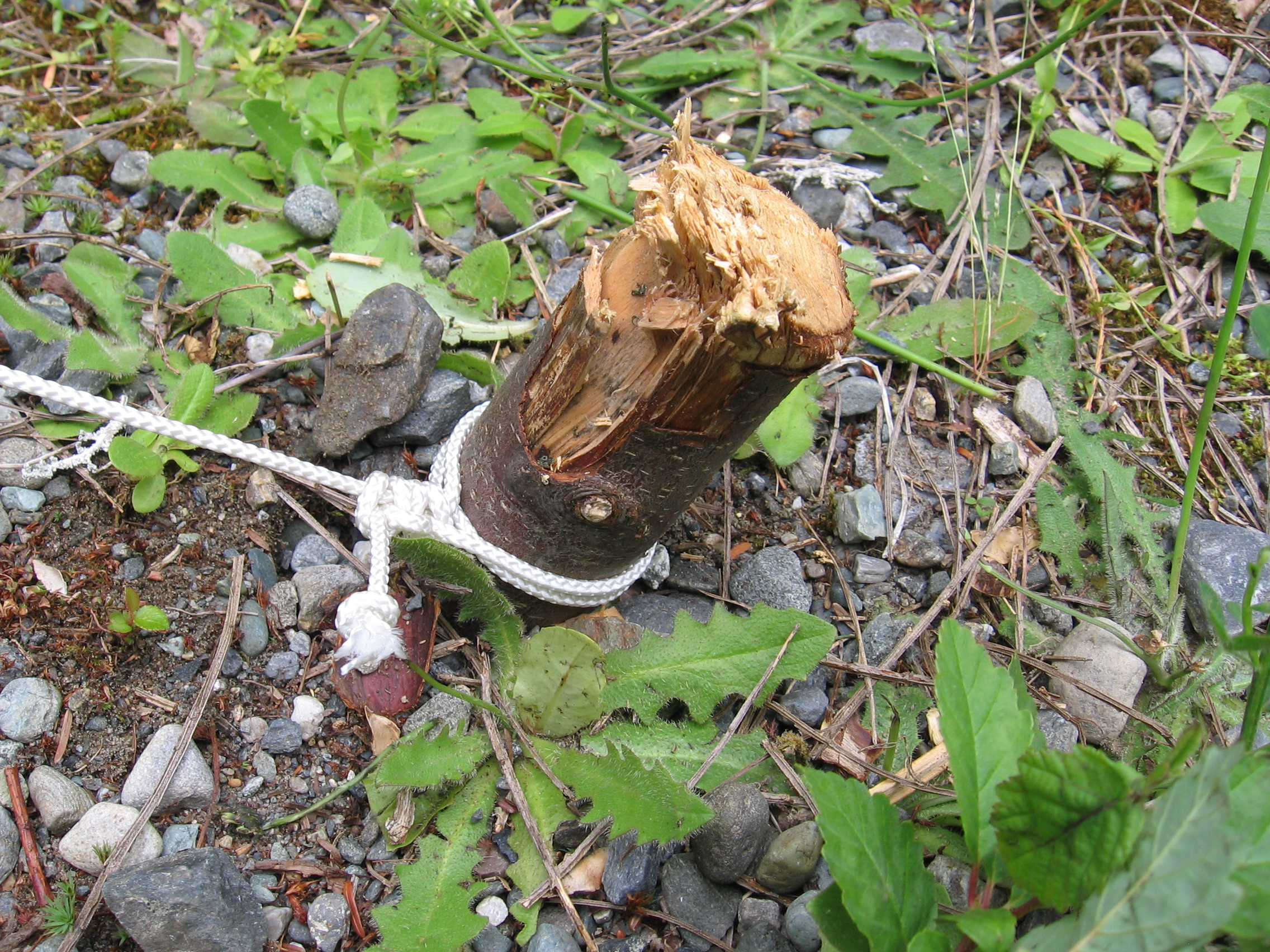
A wooden stake supporting a tent.

- Stakes (or tent pegs) or screws may be used to fasten the tent to the ground. Some are attached to guy ropes that pull outward on the poles and/or fabric to help shape the tent or give it additional stability. Others are used to anchor the bottom edge of the fabric to the ground. Pegs may be made of wood, plastic, or metal. A mallet may be needed to drive thicker pegs into the ground. Skewer metal pegs consisting essentially of a length of thick wire with a hook on one end can usually be inserted by hand, except if the ground is very hard, but may not be as strong as more substantial pegs. Pegs used for guy ropes should not be driven vertically into the ground; instead for maximum strength they should be driven in at an angle so that the peg is at right angles to the guy rope attached to it. Lighter free-standing tents may need some guy ropes and pegs to prevent them from being blown away.
- Air vents help reduce the effects of condensation. When people breathe, they expel water vapour. If the outside of the tent is colder than the inside (the usual case), then this vapour will condense on the inside of the tent, on any clothing lying about, on the outside of a sleeping bag, etc. Hence ventilation helps to remove the vapour, although this may let in cold air.
- An optional tent footprint or groundsheet protector may be used. This is a separate flat groundsheet (tarp) which goes underneath the main groundsheet, and is slightly smaller than that groundsheet. The intention is to protect the main groundsheet, especially when camping on rough terrain, since it is much cheaper to replace a separate footprint groundsheet than it is to replace a sewn-in groundsheet.

== Design factors ==
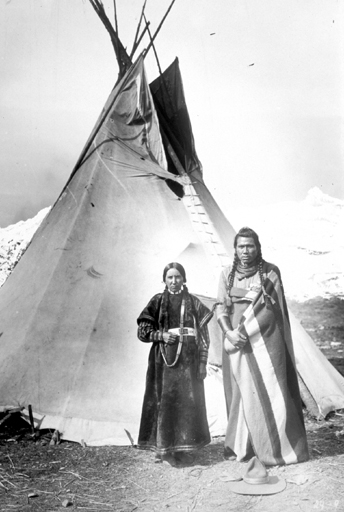
A Nez Perce tipi

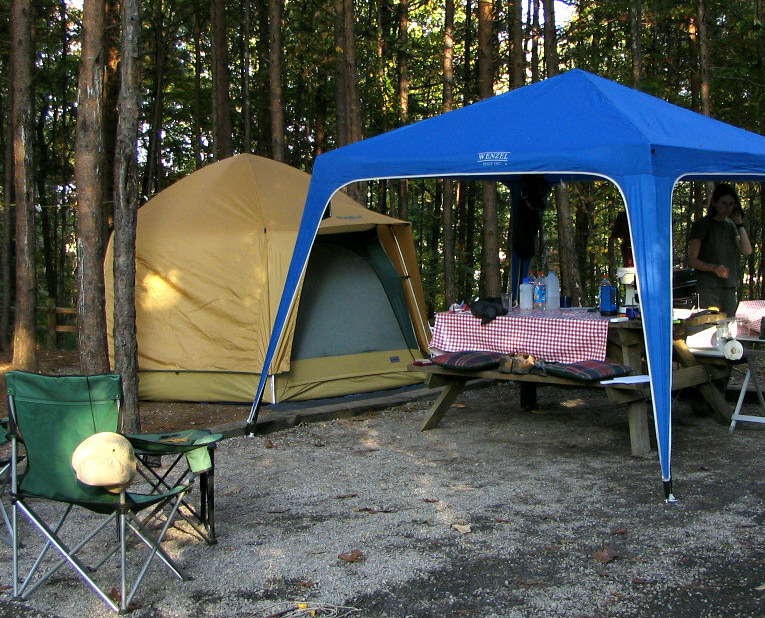
A large family tent for car-camping, with a portable gazebo.

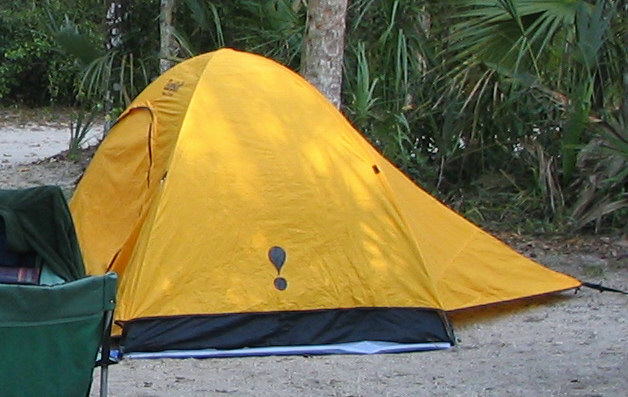
A small, two-person, backpacking tent

Many factors affect tent design, including:

- Financial cost
  - The least expensive tents tend to be heavier, less durable and less waterproof. The most expensive tents, used by serious backpackers and professional adventurers, are usually lighter in weight, more durable and more waterproof.
- Intended use
  - Backpacking, lengthy duration for carrying the tent. Weight and size are the most crucial factors.
  - Touring, high frequency of pitching and striking the tent. Ease of pitching/striking the tent is important.
  - Static, staying at one campsite for a week or two at a time. A comfortable camping experience is the target.
- Camping season
  A tent required only for summer use may be very different from one to be used in the depths of winter. Manufacturers label tents as one-season, two/three-season, three/four season, four season, etc. A one-season tent is generally for summer use only, and may only be capable of coping with light showers. A three-season tent is for spring/summer/autumn and should be capable of withstanding fairly heavy rain, or very light snow. A four-season tent should be suitable for winter camping in all but the most extreme conditions; an expedition tent (for mountain conditions) should be strong enough to cope with heavy snow, strong winds, as well as heavy rain. Some tents are sold, quite cheaply, as festival tents; these may be suitable only for camping in dry weather, and may not even be showerproof.
- Size of tent
  - The number and age of people who will be camping determines how big and what features the sleeping area(s) must have.
  - To allow for inclement weather, some covered living space separate from the sleeping area(s) may be desirable. Alternatively, cyclists on a camping trip may wish for enough covered space to keep their bicycles out of the weather.
  - To allow for sunshine, an awning to provide shade may not go amiss. Some tents have additional poles so that the fabric doorways can be used as awnings.
  - Internal height. Manufacturers quote the maximum internal height, but the usable internal height may be a little lower, depending on the tent style. Ridge tents have a steeply sloping roof so the whole height is rarely usable. Dome tents slope gently in all directions from the peak enabling nearly the entire height to be usable for a large portion of the tent. Tunnel tents have a good usable height along the center line. Frame and cabin tents have gently sloping roofs and near vertical walls. To fully evaluate the usable space in a tent, both the maximum wall height and slope must be considered. There are four useful heights used to evaluate appropriate tent height: lie down only, sit, kneel, stand. The exact heights at which these apply depend on the heights of the campers involved; those over 182 cm (5.97 ft) are likely to have less choice of tents than those who are somewhat shorter. As a starting point, sitting height is often between 90 and 105 cm (2 ft 11 in and 3 ft 5 in), and kneeling height may be between 120 and 150 cm (3.9 and 4.9 ft). These different heights are useful for evaluating whether certain tasks, such as changing clothes, can be accomplished in the tent.
- Number of sleeping areas
  Larger tents sometimes are partitioned into separate sleeping areas or rooms. A tent described as viz-a-viz (cabin tent) usually has two separate sleeping areas with a living area in between.
- Tent color
  In some areas there is a move toward reducing the visual impact of campsites. The best colors for low visibility are green, brown, tan or khaki.
  An opposing consideration is of safety and calls for visible unnatural colors, such as bright yellow-orange or red. Bright-colored tents can be easily spotted from the air in cases of an emergency. They are important in places where vehicles may not notice a low-visibility tent and run over its unsuspecting occupiers. Campers wandering away from camp will find their way back more easily if their tent is highly visible. Additionally, lost hikers may find rescue by spotting a visible camp site from afar. Some people have a personal preference for various colors and some manufacturers see the colors as part of their product branding.
- Setup effort
  Some styles of camping and living outdoors entails quick setup of tents. As a general rule, the more robust the tent, the more time and effort needed to set up and dismantle, though specific design attention on quick setup (possibly in exchange for cost and/or weight) can alter that (for example, the Swedish manufacturer Hilleberg specify a design goal that their toughest tents should be easily pitched by a single camper in inclement weather while wearing mittens, but the implementation of that adds to their price). The style of the tent also has a great impact on its ease of use.
- Weather conditions
  A tent can be more or less able to cope with cold weather or rainy conditions. The amount of water resistance is sometimes measured in the unit millimeters, water gauge. Tents can be defined by the number of season that they can be used. There are two-season, three-season and four-season tents. Two-season tents are ideal for warm/hot temperatures but do not cope well with rainy and windy conditions. Three-season tents can handle most weather conditions including rain and wind but will struggle in heavy snow. Four-season tents can withstand any weather conditions. Design and material vary depending on the number of seasons the tent can withstand.

== Shelters ==
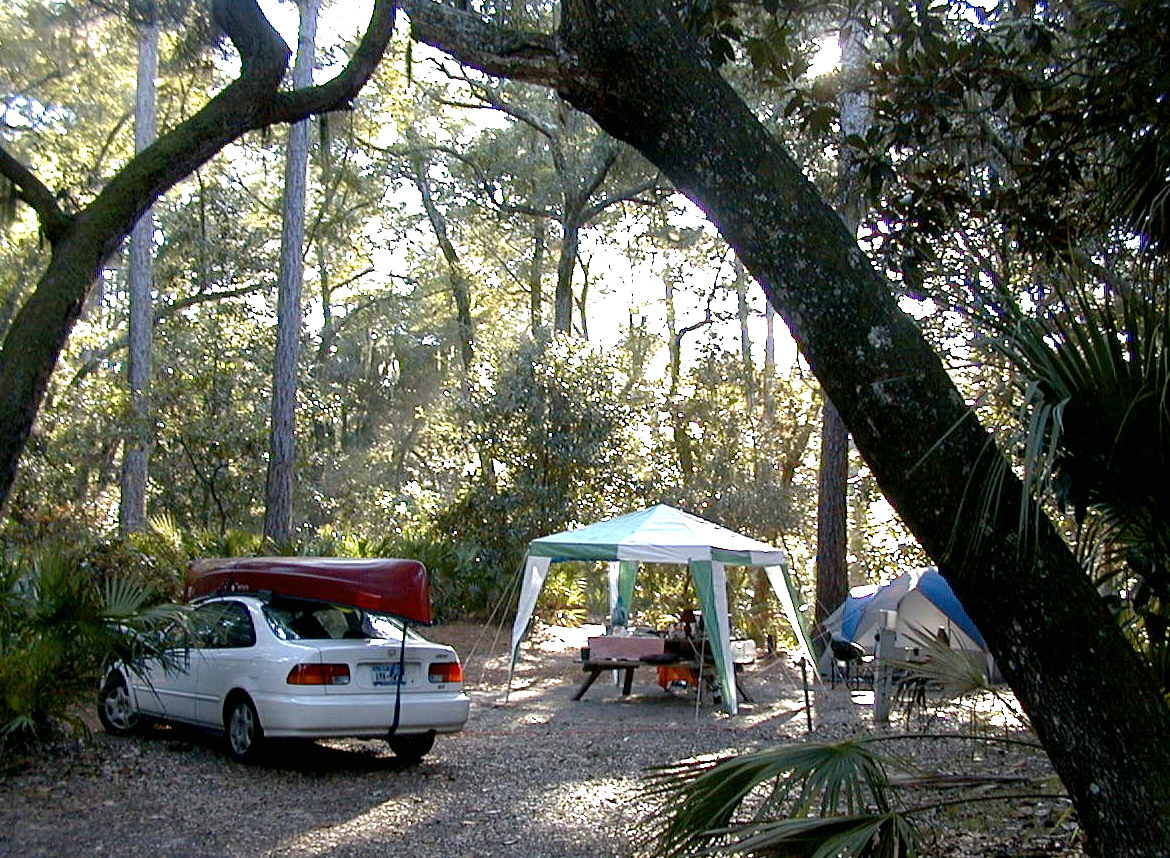
A gazebo provides a useful shelter

A dining fly

Shelters are not normally used for sleeping. Instead they may act as a store or provide shelter from sun, rain, or dew.

- A fly (or flysheet) consists of a single rectangular sheet of material. Two opposite sides are held up in the middle by poles, or sometimes just a rope between conveniently placed trees. The tops of the poles are attached via guy ropes to pegs, in order to keep the poles upright. Additional guy ropes are attached to the lower edges to pull them outwards away from the poles.
- A gazebo uses a framework of metal poles to support a roof. This structure provides a lot more usable space than does a flysheet, since the gently sloping roof allows for a reasonable amount of headroom even at the edges (like a frame tent). Because a gazebo is free-standing, it is often used as a shelter for a temporary shop at a fair or street market.
- A beach tent is often a simplified form of dome tent and provide a useful (relatively sand-free) place to temporarily store beach equipment, but is at most showerproof. Some beach tents use specially treated fabric which is opaque to ultra-violet light, and so provide some protection against sunburn. Maximum height is typically about 120 cm (3.9 ft), and they are usually not large enough for an adult to lie down in.
- A fishermen's tent is also a modified dome tent, often with a projecting awning high enough to sit under, but sometimes with no closable doorway.

== Modern styles ==
With modern materials, tent manufacturers have great freedom to vary types and styles and shapes of tents.

- The poles effectively hold the tent in the required shape.
- Poles which dismantle for ease of transport are either colour-coded or linked by chain or cord, so there is little doubt as to which poles connect where.
- Relatively few guy ropes are needed (sometimes none).
- The exact positioning of any guy ropes is not too critical.

=== Rigid poles ===
Many tents which use rigid steel poles are free-standing and do not require guy ropes, though they may require pegs around the bottom edge of the fabric. These tents are usually so heavy (25 to 80 kg) that it takes a rather strong wind to blow them away.

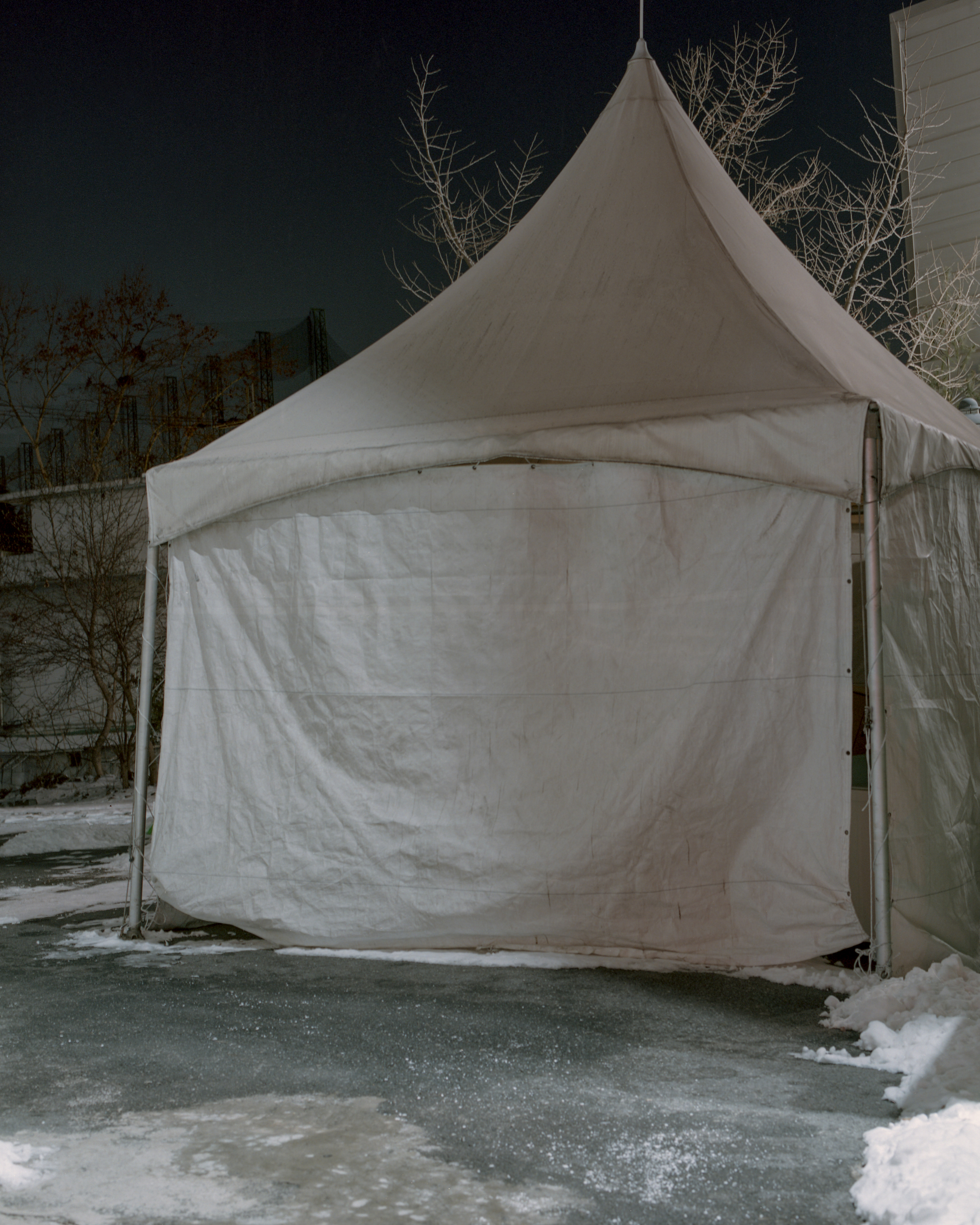
Small rigid pole tent used as a garage.

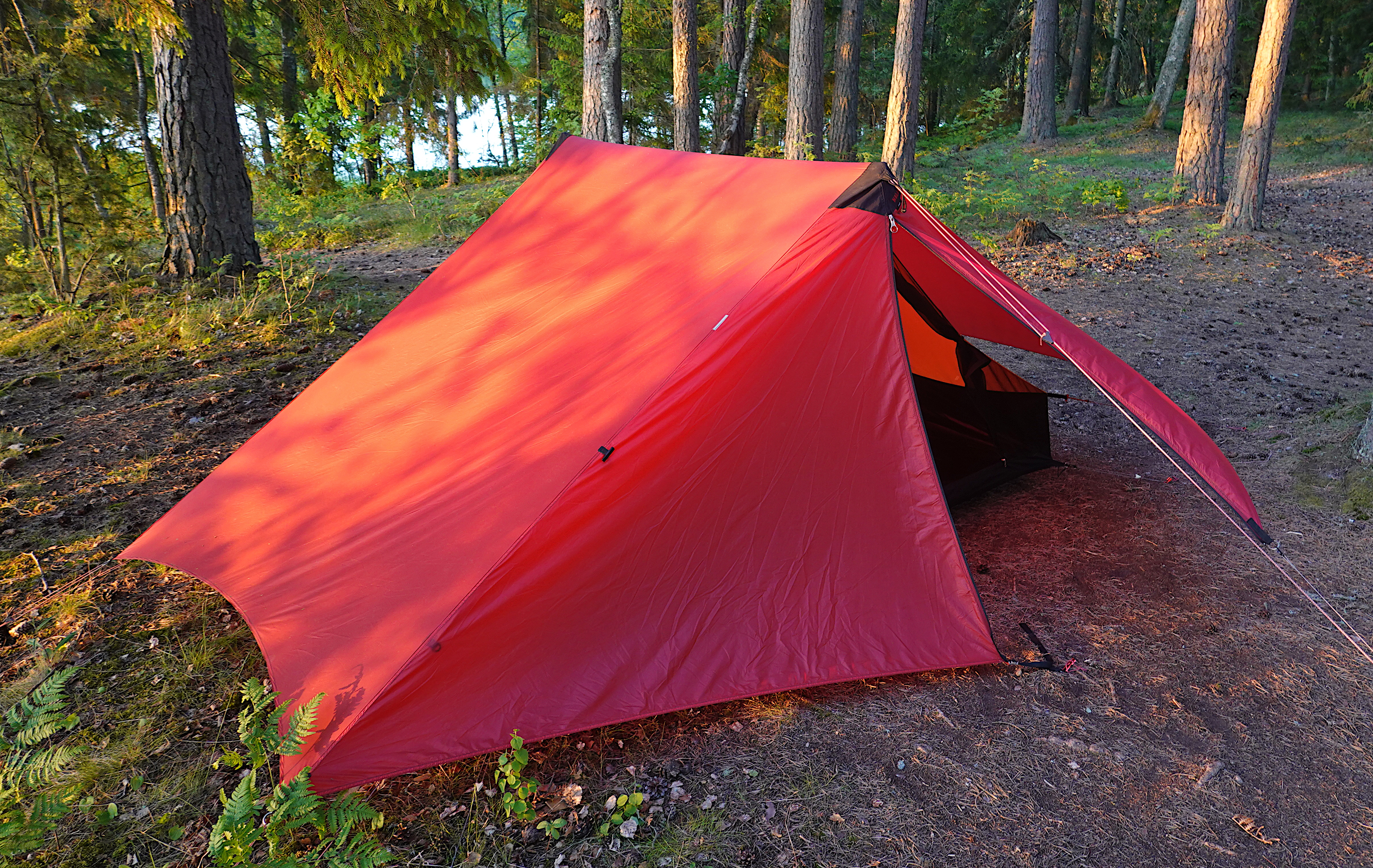
Hilleberg Ridge tent, two person, three‑season

- Frame tents are double-skin tents. They have a living area and one or more cotton/nylon/polyester inner tents. The outer tent is draped over a free-standing steel frame, and may be made of canvas or polyester (the latter often has a hydrostatic head of 3000 mm, i.e. three season camping). The living area is generally at least as large as the sleeping area, and there may be a specific section with a window and extra air vents for use as a kitchen. The walls are nearly vertical and are typically about 150 to 180 cm (4.9 to 5.9 ft) high. The center of the gently sloping roof is often 210 cm (6.9 ft) high or more and provides reasonable headroom throughout. The smaller two-person models were less than 3 metres square (10 ft), but these have largely been replaced by dome or tunnel tents. The larger eight-person models may exceed 5 metres (16 feet) in length and/or width.
- Cabin tents are single-skin tents used mainly in the USA. They often have nylon walls, polyester roof, and a polyethylene floor, plus an awning at one or both ends. With a hydrostatic head of only 1000 mm, they may best be considered as summer tents. Removable internal dividers allow the cabin to be split into 'rooms'. Sizes may range from 13 ft by 8 ft (two rooms) up to 25 ft by 10 ft (four rooms), with wall and roof heights similar to those of frame tents. There are three separate pole units, with each unit consisting of two uprights and a connecting ridge. These pole units support the centre and ends of the roof, and are usually outside the tent.
- Pop-up tents use a linkage to raise the tent from its stored form.
- Wall tents are the largest and most accommodating canvas tents available. They are popular with hunters and backcountry campers. Wall tents provide much room space, as well as more than enough head space which allows people to move about freely inside the tent without crouching or bending over. This type of set up is great for those who spend much time in their tents, as well as for those who need extra space for cots, tables, stoves, etc. Also known as outfitter tents.
- Spike tents are smaller and lighter than wall tents and so they are easier to pack and lighter to haul, they are a good choice if weight is the main concern and if there are not many people sleeping in one tent. Spike tent frames vary in size and style but are almost always lighter than wall tent frames. Also known as wigwam tents.
- Range tents are similar to spike tents in their shape and size, except range tents usually do not have side walls at all. They resemble a pyramid type shape and are often referred to as pyramid tents. Range tents can either be set up with a bi-pole system that goes on the outside of the tent, or they can be set up using a single frame pole which goes in the middle of the tent on the inside, and they can also be set up by tying the top of the tent to a hanging tree branch. Also known as teepee tents.

=== Flexible poles ===
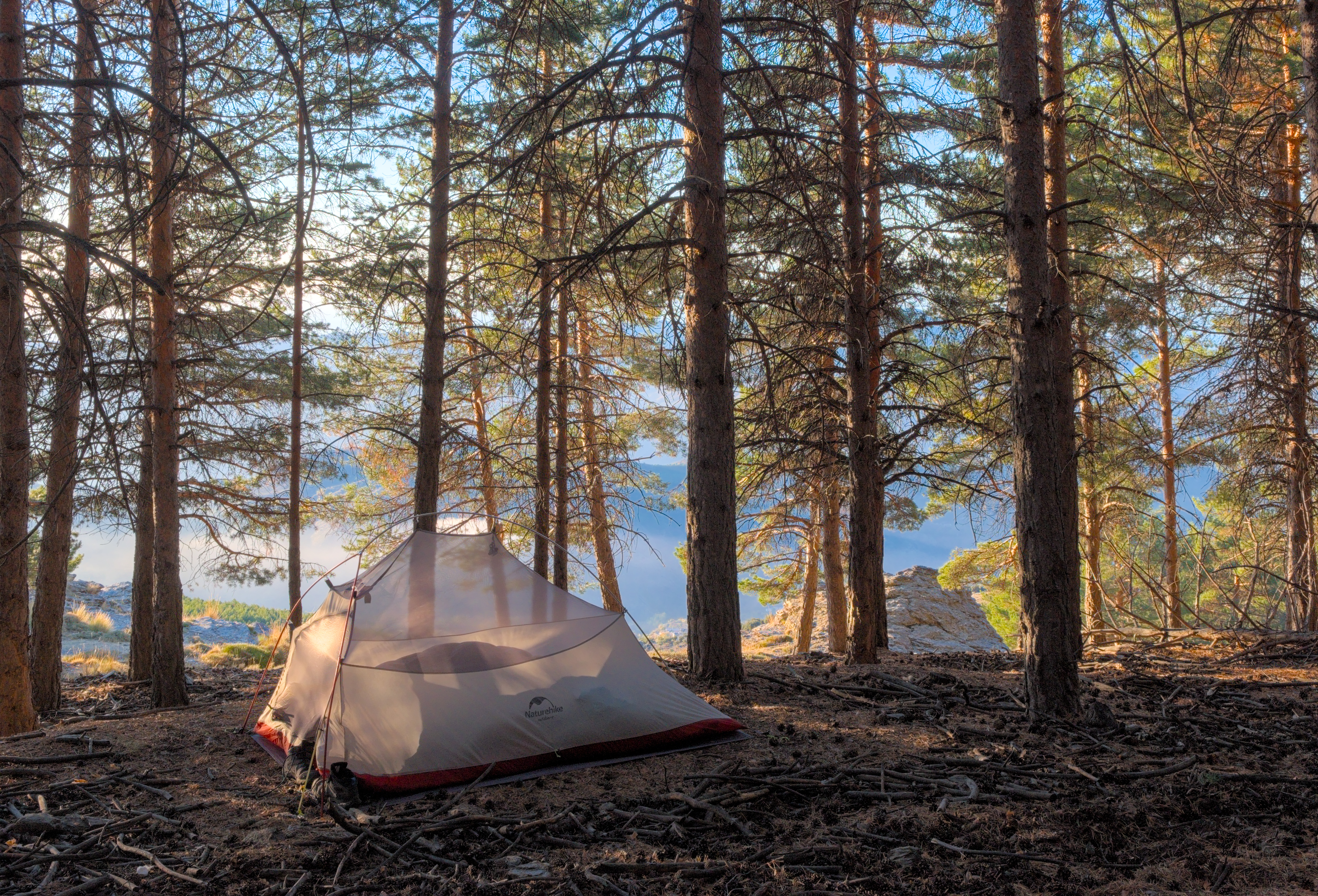
Wild camping with a dome tent in Sierra Nevada National Park

Flexible poles used for tents in this section are typically between 3 and 6 metres (9.8 and 19.7 ft) long. Cheap poles are made of tubes of fibreglass with an external diameter less than 1 cm (1/3 in), whereas more expensive aluminium alloys are the material of choice for added strength and durability. For ease of transportation, these poles are made in sections some 30 to 60 cm (0.98 to 1.97 ft) long, with one end of each section having a socket into which the next section can fit. For ease of assembly, the sections for each pole are often connected by an internal elastic cord running the entire length of the pole.

- Dome tents have a very simple structure and are available in a wide variety of sizes ranging from lightweight two-person tents with limited headroom up to six or nine-person tents with headroom exceeding 180 cm (5.9 ft). These may be single wall, or single-wall with partial flysheet, or double wall. Depending on the pole arrangement, some models pitch outer-tent first, while others pitch inner-tent first. The former helps keep the inner tent dry, but the latter is easier to pitch.

The basic dome has a rectangular floor and two poles which cross at the peak; each pole runs in a smooth curve from one bottom corner, up to the peak, and then down to the diagonally opposite bottom corner. There are usually special fittings at each corner which fit into sockets at the ends of each pole – pole tension keeps everything in shape. The poles can run on either the inside or outside of the tent fabric. When located on the interior, poles are held in place by a variety of means including hook and loop style straps, clips, and other fastening hardware. Poles that are located on the outside of the tent fabric are attached via fabric pole sleeves or plastic clips. Dome tents do not require guy ropes and pegs for structural integrity as they are considered free-standing, but must be pegged down in high winds.

The basic dome design has been modified extensively, producing tents with three poles, tents with irregularly-shaped bases, and other unusual types. A common variation is to add a third pole between two adjacent corners; this is angled away from the tent and supports an extension of the flysheet, to give a porch/storage area.

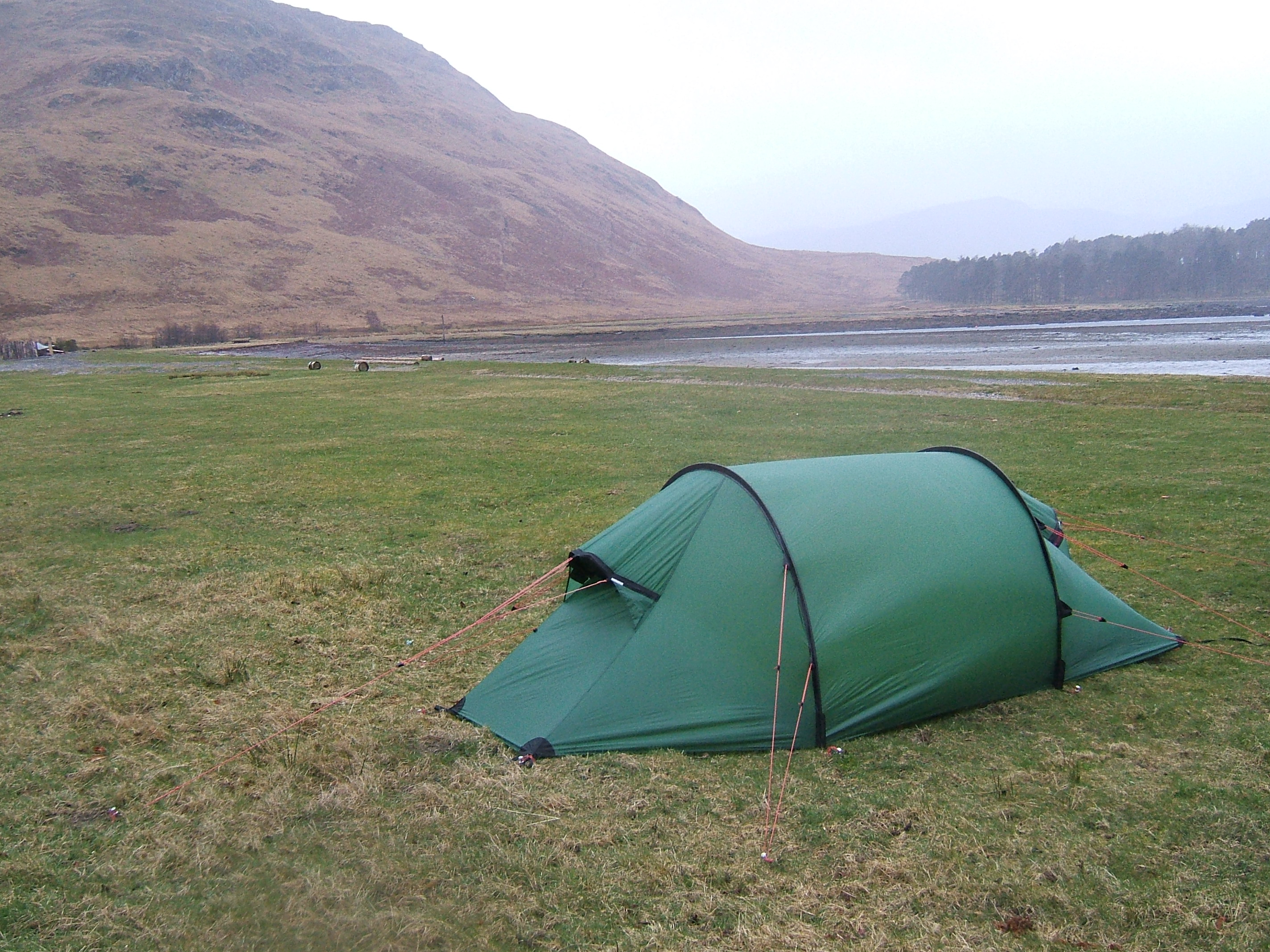
Tunnel tent

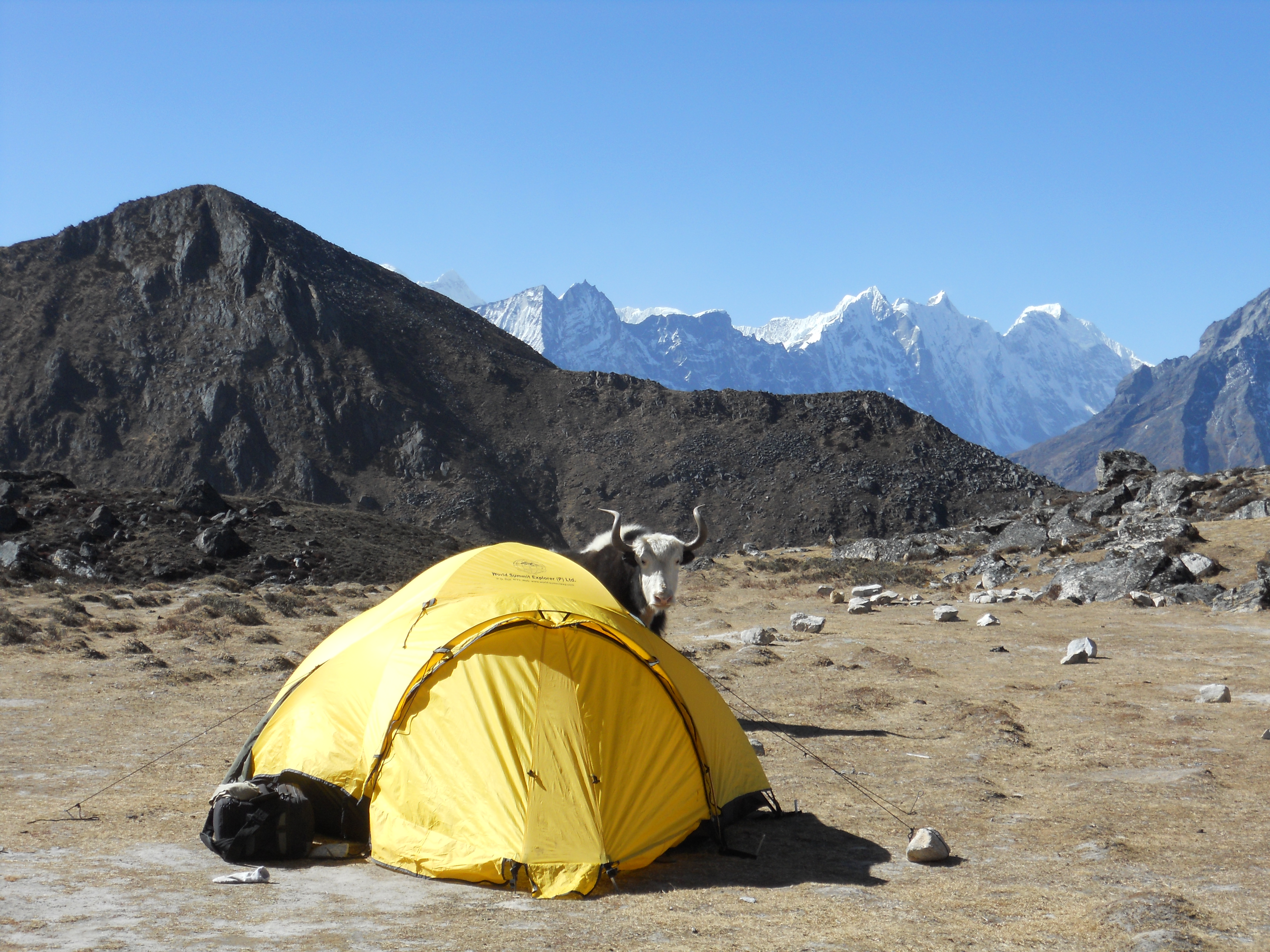
Tent used by mountaineers in Nepal

- Tunnel tents may offer more usable internal space than a dome tent with the same ground area, but almost always need guy ropes and pegs to stay upright. These are almost always double wall tents. Sizes range from one-person tents with very limited headroom up to eight or ten-person tents with headroom exceeding 180 cm (5.9 ft).

A basic tunnel tent uses two or more flexible poles, arranged as parallel hoops, with tent fabric attached to form a half-cylinder or tapering tunnel. The most common designs have a sleeping area at one end and a vestibule area at the other, though vestibules (possibly extended) at each end are not uncommon, or vis-à-vis sleeping at either end and a central opening to a common vestibule area are made too.

- Hybrid dome/tunnel tents are now common. One variation is to use a basic dome as the sleeping area; one or two hooped poles to one side are linked by a tunnel to the dome to provide a porch. Another variation is to use a large dome as the living area, with up to four tunnel extensions to provide sleeping areas.
- Geodesic tents are essentially dome tents with two or more extra poles which criss-cross the normal two poles to help support the basic shape and minimise the amount of unsupported fabric. This makes them more suitable for use in snowy conditions and in strong winds. To help withstand strong winds they are rarely more than 120 or 150 cm (3.9 or 4.9 ft) high.
- Single-hoop tents use just one flexible pole and are often sold as light-weight one or two-person tents. These are the modern equivalent of older style pup tents, and have the same feature of somewhat limited headroom. Different styles may have the pole going either along or across the tent.
- The pop-up tent is a recent innovation. This type of tent has flexible hoops that are twisted when the tent is folded. Unbinding the tent releases the torsional stress on the hoops, allowing them to instantly expand into form. Such tents are usually single-skinned and are generally aimed at the one-season or children's end of the market; their high flexibility makes them unsuitable for use in windy situations.

=== Inflatable airbeams ===
Inflatable pole supports, also known as airbeams, serve as rigid structural supports when inflated but are soft and pliable when deflated. Tents using such technology are neither commonly used nor widely accepted and are available from a very limited number of suppliers.

Much like a bicycle tube and tire, airbeams are often composed of a highly dimensionally stable (i.e. no stretch) fabric sleeve and an air-holding inner bladder. However, other airbeam constructions consist of coated fabrics that are cut and manufactured to its intended shape by a method such as thermal welding. Depending on the desired tent size, airbeams can be anywhere from 2-40 inches in diameter, inflated to different pressures. High pressure airbeams (40-80 psi) that are filled by compressors are most often used in larger shelters, whereas low pressure beams (5-7 psi) are preferred for recreational use. The relatively low pressure enables the use of a manual pump to inflate the airbeam to the desired level. Airbeams have the unique quality of bending, rather than breaking, when overloaded. Tents that use inflatable airbeams are structured almost identically to those that use flexible poles.

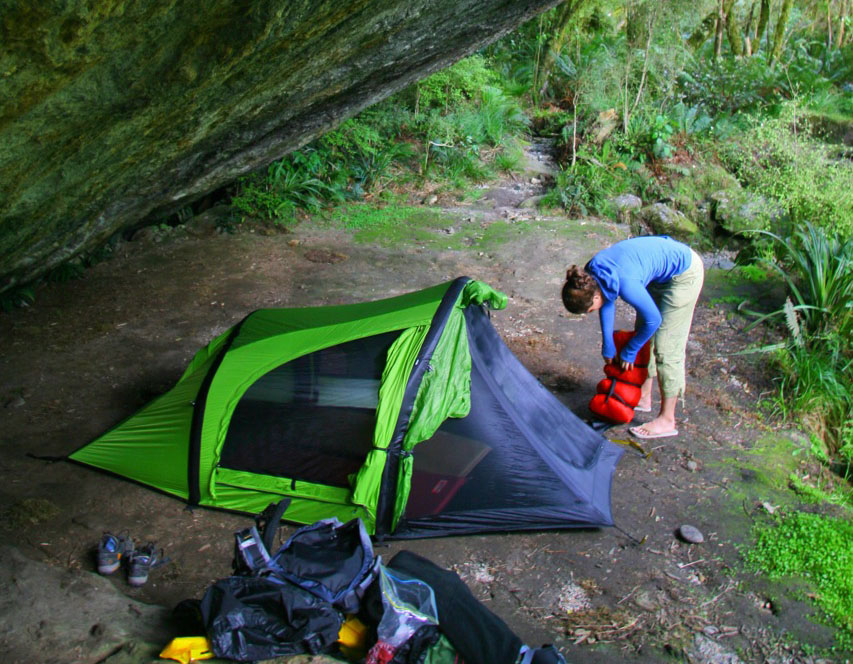
Inflatable airbeam tunnel tent

- Dome tents that use inflatable airbeam support are available in a variety of sizes ranging from lightweight 2-person to larger 6+ person shelters, and are virtually identical to the arrangement of flexible-pole supported dome tents. Beams are usually integrated into the tent shell such that they do not have to be reinserted every time setup occurs. Airbeams can be located on either the inside or outside of the tent shell. Similar to the pole-supported construction, airbeam supported dome tents are free standing but should be staked out with pegs and guyout lines to increase stability and strength.
- Tunnel tents are a common form of airbeam supported tents because their size can be easily modified by adding additional hoops. Military applications use this style of tent for a range of purposes including medical shelters, helicopter enclosures, and airplane hangars. In these constructions, hoops are generally identical in size. In commercial airbeam supported tents, the hoops can be different sizes. Tunnel tents tend to withstand high winds well because of their low profile shape. However, the tents are not freestanding and must be anchored and guyed out securely.

== Older tent styles ==
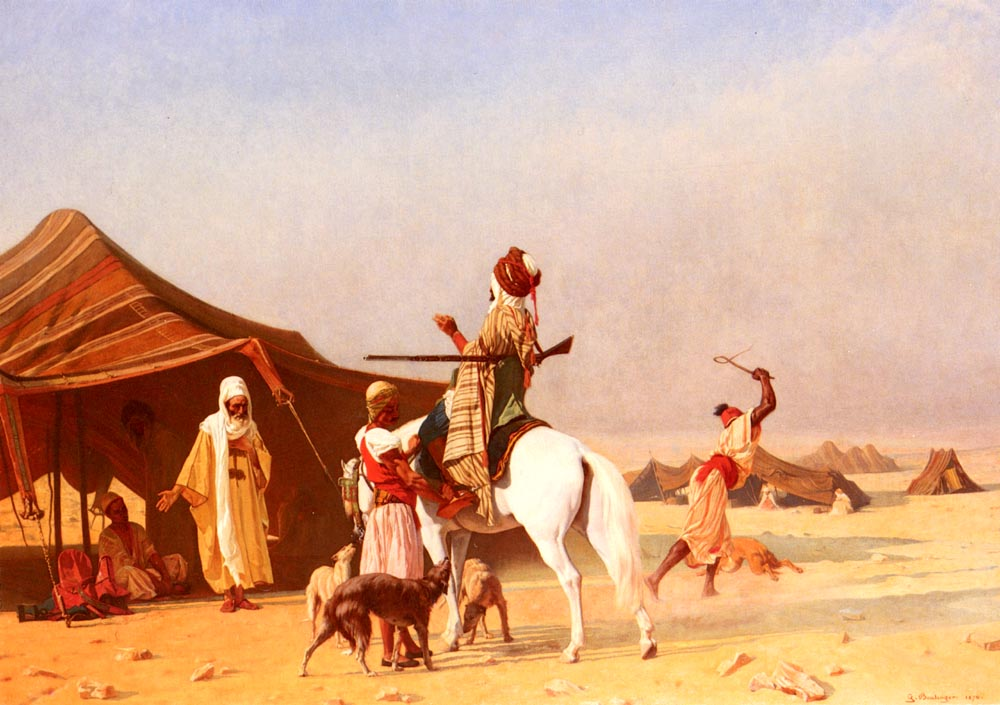
Arabian tent from Boulanger's painting C'est Un Emir.

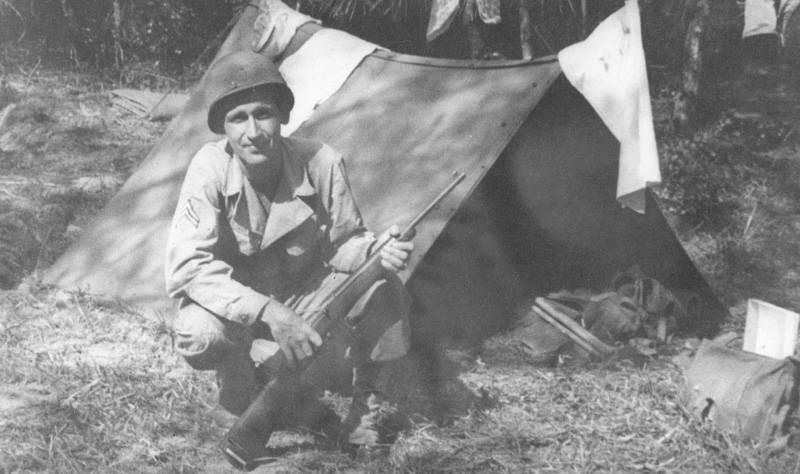
U.S. Army pup tent in World War II

Most of these tent styles are no longer generally available. Most of these are single-skin designs, with optional fly sheets for the ridge tents.

All the tents listed here had a canvas fabric and most used a substantial number of guy ropes (8 to 18). The guys had to be positioned and tensioned fairly precisely in order to pitch the tent correctly, so some training and experience were needed. Pup tents might use wooden or metal poles, but all the other styles mentioned here used wooden poles.

- A pup tent is a small version of a ridge tent intended for 1 to 3 people. It usually has a rectangular floor of size ranging from 4 ft by 6 ft up to 6 ft by 8 ft, and ridge heights ranging from 3 ft up to 5 ft. Larger versions have side walls, usually about 1 ft high. There are guy ropes for each pole. Versions with sides add guys at each corner and in the centre of each side. These guy ropes help to maintain the required shape. Earlier versions had a single upright pole at each end, while later versions often have two poles at each end, arranged rather like an 'A' shape, in order to make access easier. Some models have a horizontal ridge pole joining the tops of the end poles to support the centre of the tent. Many armies issue pup tents as shelter halves, with each soldier carrying half a tent in his field gear, so two soldiers together can pitch a tent and share it.
- A ridge tent or wall tent can sleep 5 to 8 people or more. They usually have a rectangular floor of size ranging from 8 ft by 10 ft up to 16 ft by 20 ft, and ridge heights around 6 ft to 9 ft. The side walls are usually about 3 ft high. They normally have a single upright pole at each end with the tops joined by a horizontal ridge pole. Longer models might have an additional upright pole in the centre to help support the ridge pole. They often have two guy ropes at each corner, and guy ropes every 2 ft along the sides. If strong winds are expected then two additional storm guy ropes are attached to the top of each pole. Ridge tents are often used by hunters and outfitters as they will accommodate several persons, their equipment and related gear. Many can be equipped with wood stoves for heating and cooking. There are several manufacturers in the U.S. and Canada that make wall tents that have foot prints of greater than 220 square feet. The canvas of wall tents may be treated for water, mildew and fire retardancy.
- A square centre-pole tent was often used for family camping in the first half of the 20th century. Despite the use of 9 poles and 12 guy ropes, such a tent could be pitched by an experienced family of four in some 10 to 15 minutes. These tents had a square floor of size ranging from 8 by 8 ft up to 15 by 15 ft. There were poles about 5 ft high at each corner and in the middle of each side, and a 10 ft or 12 ft pole in the centre – the walls were vertical and the roof was pyramid-shaped, so there was plenty of headroom over most of the tent.
- A Sibley tent (bell tent) had a circular floor plan some 10 ft to 15 ft across, a single central pole some 10 ft high, and walls about 3 ft high. Guy ropes were connected every 2 ft around the top of the walls – these had to carefully tensioned to hold the pole upright and keep the tent in shape.

== Marquees and larger tents ==
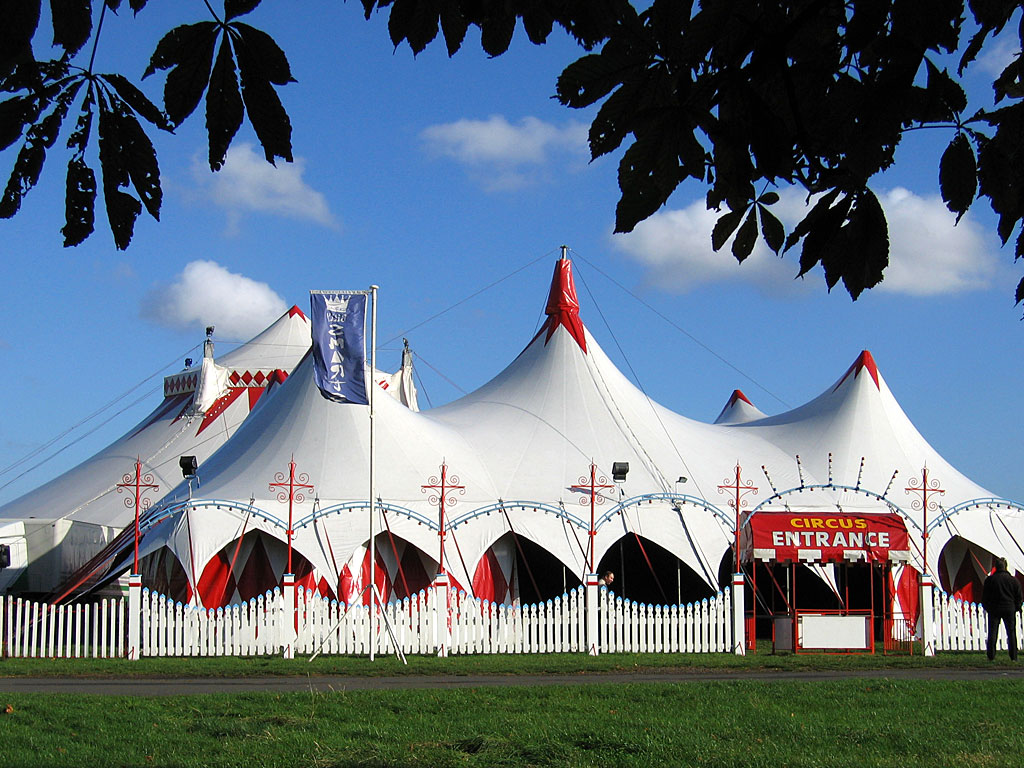
The Big Top of Billy Smart's Circus Cambridge 2004

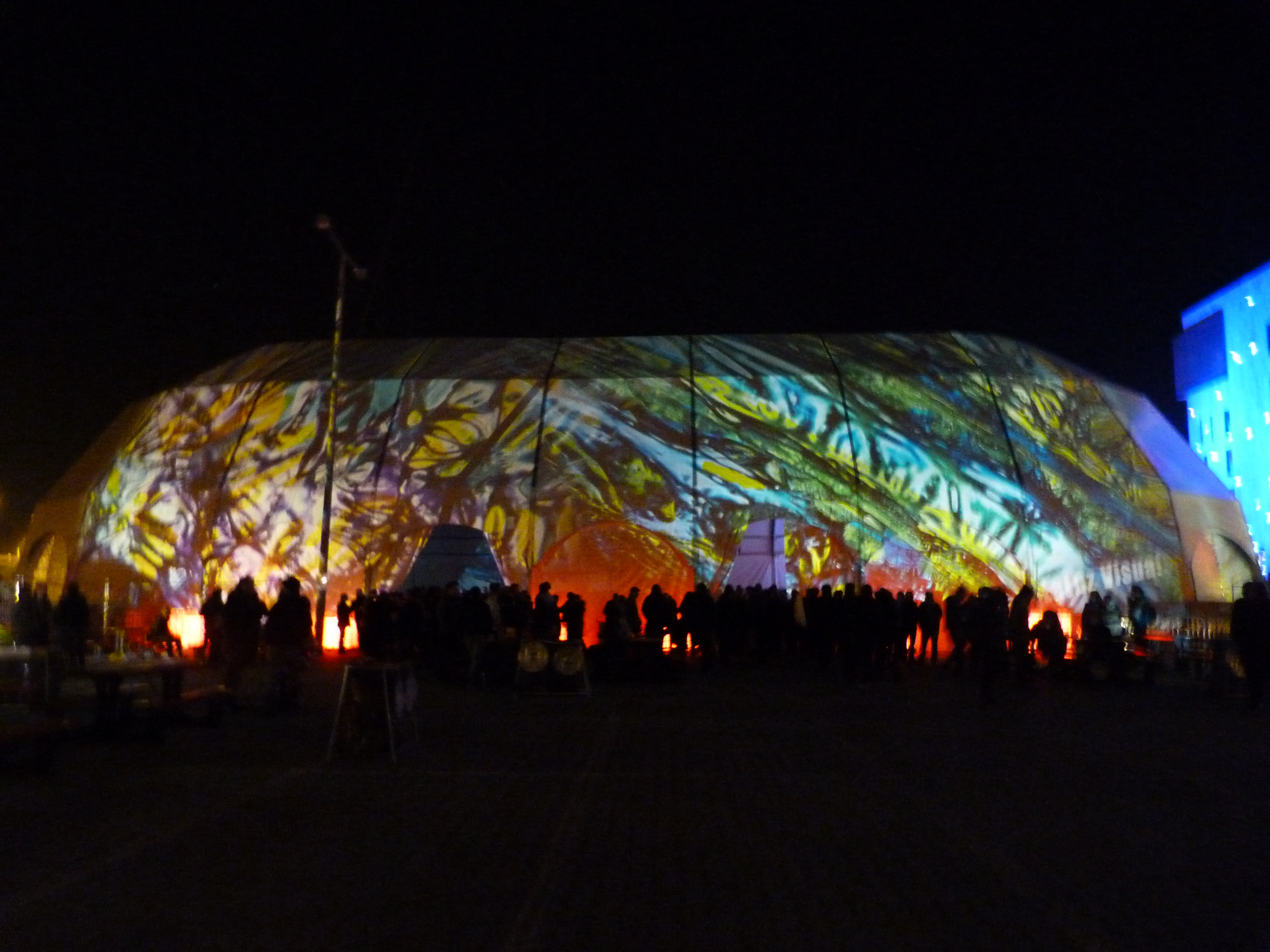
WOMEX 15 tent - Budapest

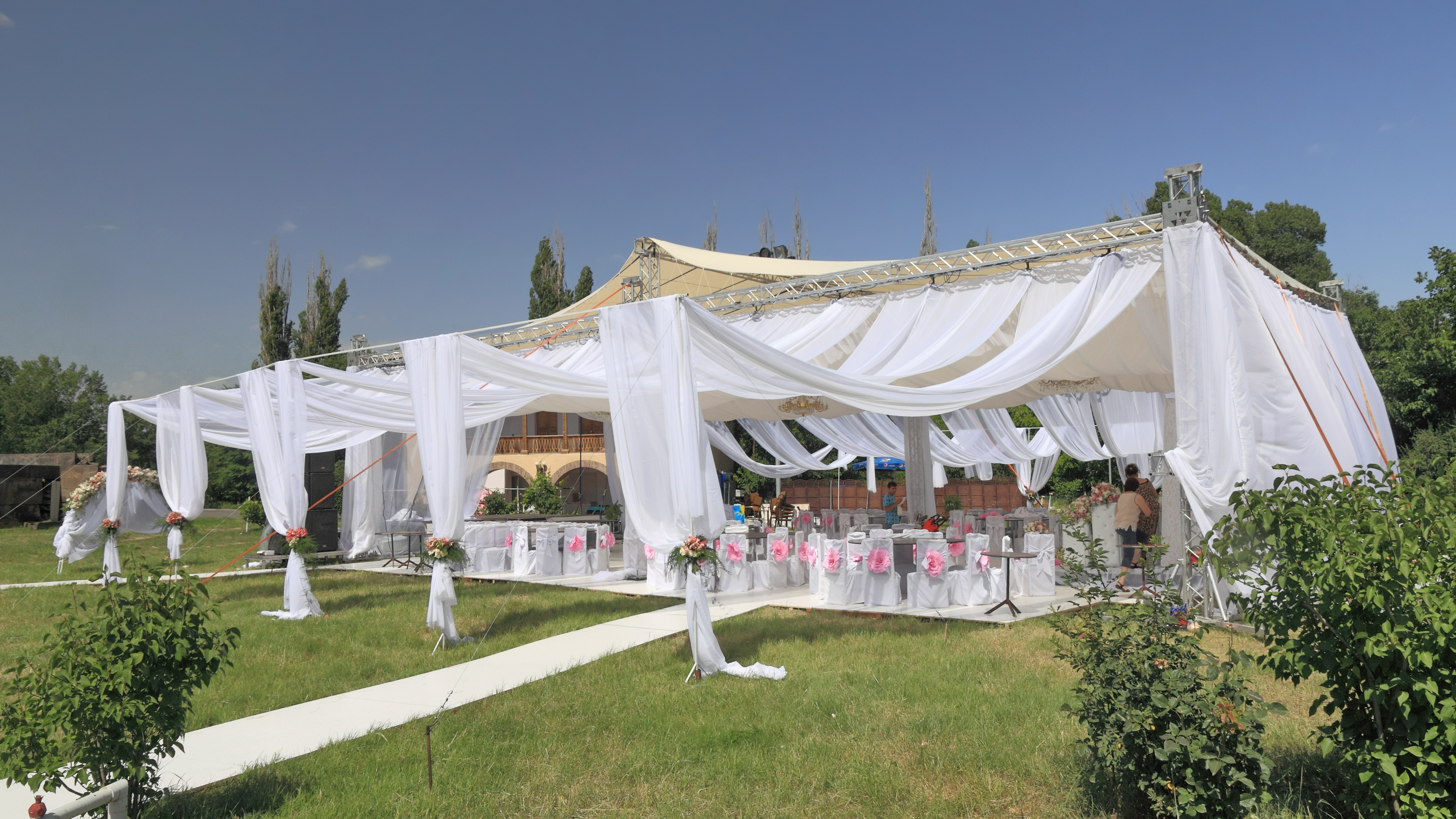
Wedding tent in Armenia

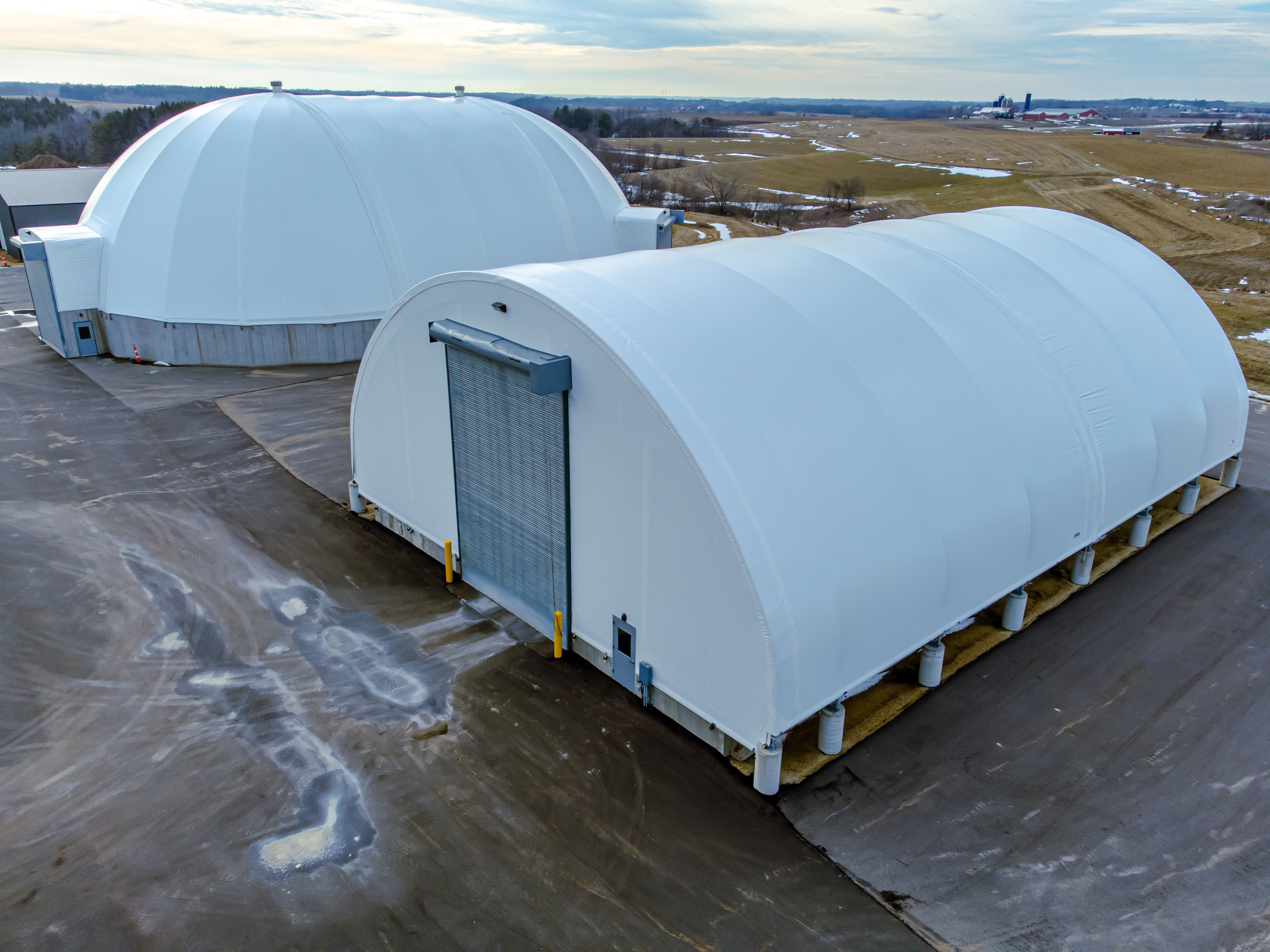
Tension fabric building with rollup overhead doors

These larger tents are seldom used for sleeping.

- A marquee is a large tent used as a temporary building. They have long been used for circus or other performances, fairs, banquets, large weddings, religious tent revival events or, more recently corporate entertainment events. Traditionally made of canvas, modern "party tents" are more likely to use PE (polythene) or, for higher quality, PVC. 'DIY' marquees are available up to 20 feet (6.1 m) wide. 30 to 150 feet (9.1 to 45.7 metres) widths are very expensive and require specialized equipment and skill to erect, so they must usually be rented. Many corporations own large (9 m to 45 m wide) marquee tents but have them installed and maintained by qualified professionals. Party tents are held down with tensioned ratchets and/or stakes. Sizes range from 10 to 150 by 400 feet (3.0 to 45.7 by 121.9 metres).
- A pole marquee consists of canvas and more recently PVC, under tension by means of centre poles, side poles and guy ropes which are attached to ground stakes hammered into soft surfaces only such as a lawn or field. Hand made of white cotton canvas, traditional poled marquees are more attractive but much less practical and versatile than aluminium frame marquees. The modern PVC traditional pole marquee was introduced due to the material being easier to clean than woven canvas and giving them a longer hire life span.
- A tension tent is a newer variation of the pole marquee. The general design is similar to the pole marquee. However, it usually has fewer poles, and the integrity of the structure is maintained by the tension of the fabric. It also is very similar to a tensile structure It is often used for outdoor weddings, parties and other events. It has been adapted and updated in various other tent types including the High Peak Frame Tent and Freeform / Stretch / Flex Tent styles developed in South Africa
- Freeform / Stretch / Flex Tents have developed since 2000 driven predominantly by companies in South Africa and in Australia. The composition of the fabric differs slightly between those from South Africa and those in Australia. Stretch Tent Fabrics have been produced using Nylon and Polyester. Since 2007 Stretch Tents have been introduced into Europe by some of the South African companies such as Intent. Stretch Tents utilize aluminum, wooden and bamboo poles capped by molded polypropylene or rubber domes that push through the stretched fabric, creating tension between the ground and the fabric. The fabric can be sculpted into various organic and curvaceous forms to provide shade and rain cover for events. The tensioned fabric must be made rigid and the tent form allow water run-off and resistance to wind load before erection is complete.
- Aluminium frame marquees – Aluminium frame tents have no centre poles or guy ropes. This kind of marquee can be erected on almost any surface and adjacent to buildings or annexe tents. The Aluminium frame tent is much more stable and can span a much wider area over pools, flower beds or trees. In the UK this design is the most commonly used style for most retail rentals and can be found being used as temporary structures for storage in retail and military applications.

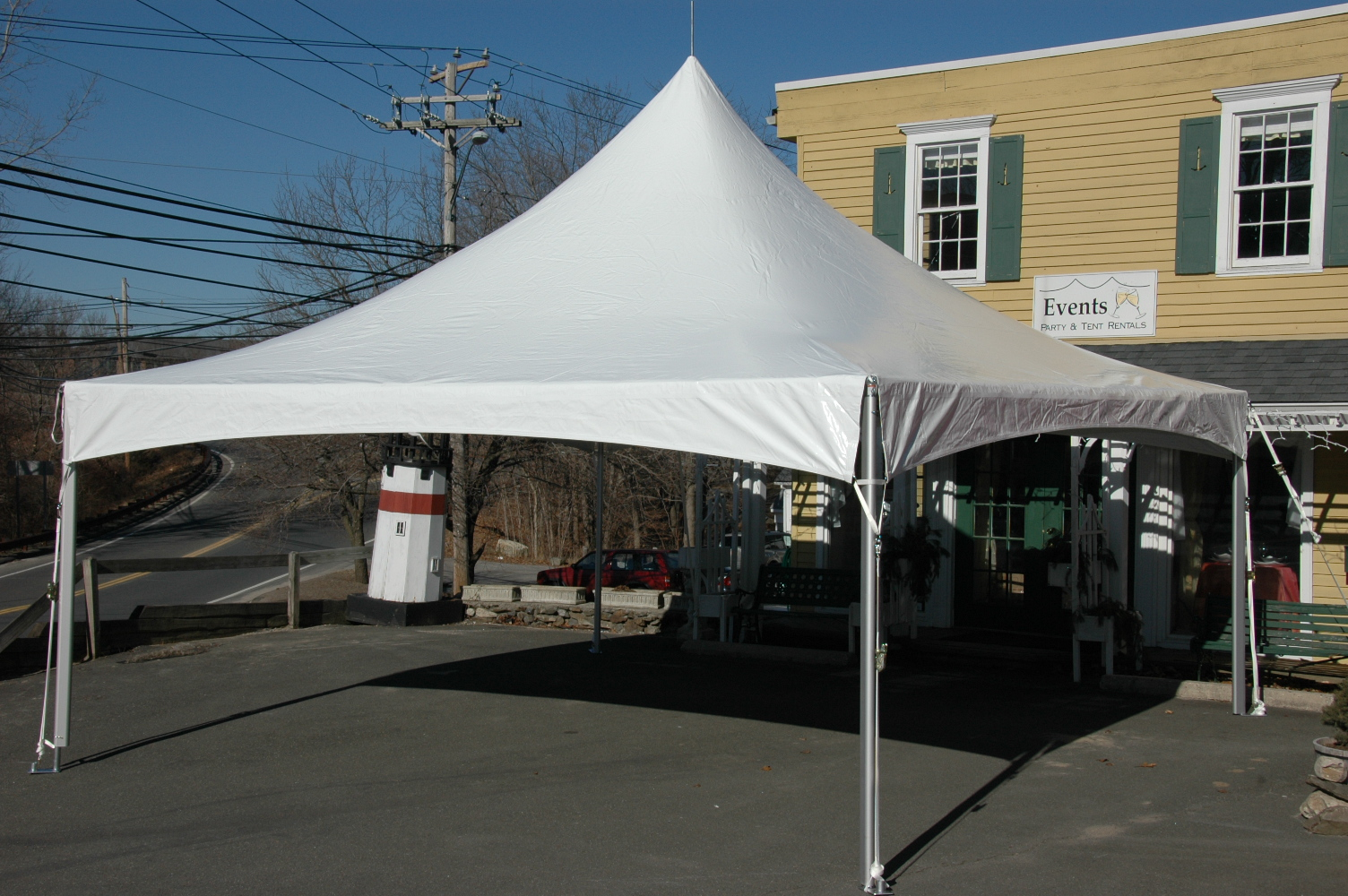
A typical 20'x20' high peak frame tent.

- A newer category of the Marquee/Party tents is the High Peak Frame Tents (known by several brand names like "frame & cable", "vista", "pinnacle", "Century" etc.). These tents have the advantage of the pole tents with the high top, ease of installation, cleaner look, and fewer parts. They also have the advantage of the Frame Tents as they do not have support pole(s) on the inside of the tent that touches the ground. The high top look is accomplished by using a "floating pole", which is a pole that sits on cables that run across the tent interior from the top of the sides. Most tent manufactures are now making these tents and they come in a variety of sizes and shapes that can be joined to meet the needs of unique space requirements.
- Marquee tents typically have interchangeable parts, which allow for a rental company to easily expand to larger sizes. Tents can be ordered in a variety of colours. However, white is by far the most popular colour. Skylights can also be built into the fabric, which allow a greater amount of light to enter and is useful if walls are being used. Walls can also be ordered with clear vinyl windows in them.
- Shamiana is a popular Indian ethnic tent shelter, which is commonly used for outdoor parties, marriages, restaurants etc. Its side walls are detachable. The external fabric can be multicolored or can hold exquisite designs. The history of Shamiana, dates back to the Mughal era. As per Government of India service tax rules under Finance Act 1997, the definition of Shamiana is given under the clause (77A) of section 65, that is: "pandal or shamiana means a place specially prepared or arranged for organizing an official, social or business function".
- "Bail Ring Tents" are usually tents that are 100 to 150 feet (30 to 46 metres) wide and expandable to any length. They can be made from either vinyl or canvas. The purpose of the bail ring style is to raise an enormous amount of material "the tent" off the ground without using heavy machinery. Initially, the center poles are raised and guyed out to stakes after which the tent is spread out and connected to the bail ring using shackles. Once the outside of the tent is raised a crew of men can go under the tent and start raising the bail ring up the center pole using a system of pulleys. This style of tent is not as popular as it was in the past due to the advancement of forklifts and skidsteers. There was a time when even smaller tents 40 to 100 feet (12 to 30 metres) were often raised and set using a bail ring.
- The four Major golf tournaments have tents set up. They are usually 40 by 40 feet (12 by 12 metres).
- Tents or marquees are often hired from specialist companies.
- A "Rubb Hall" is a large tent used primarily as emergency warehousing.
- A circus tent usually has one or more oval or circular arenas surrounded by tiered seating which might accommodate thousands of people. Nowadays such large tents are made of some artificial fibre (polyester or vinyl) and are often erected with the help of cranes. In earlier times it was common for the circus elephants to be used as a source of power for pulling ropes to haul the canvas into position.
- Spiegeltent, a Belgian tent constructed in wood and canvas and decorated with mirrors and stained glass, intended as an entertainment venue

== Influence on building design ==
Tent design has influenced many large modern buildings. These buildings have in turn influenced the next generation of tent design. Tent-style tensile structures are used to cover large public areas such as entertainment venues, arenas and retail areas (example: The O_{2}) or sports stadiums (example: Munich Olympic Stadium) and airports (example: Denver International Airport). The Sami Parliament of Norway is inspired by the lavvu, a tent traditionally used by the Sami people.

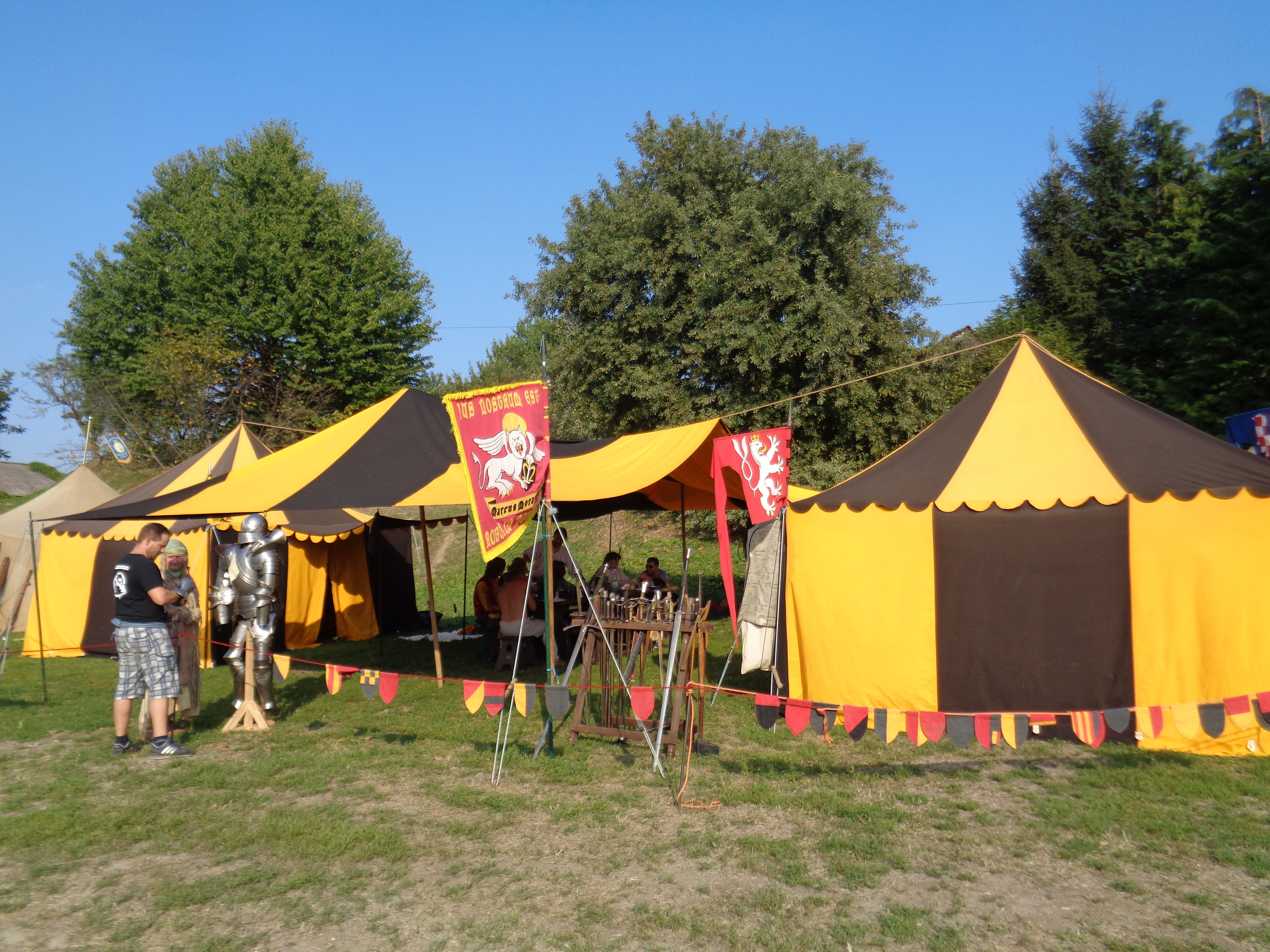
Historical reenactment tents at Koprivnica Renaissance Festival, Croatia

== See also ==
- Hammock camping
- List of house types
- Roof tent
- Salembaree
- Swag
- Tension fabric building
- Tent revival
- Truck tent
