= American =

American(s) most often refers to:

- American, something of, from, or related to the United States of America, commonly known as the "United States" or "America"
  - Americans, citizens and nationals of the United States of America
  - American ancestry, people who self-identify their ancestry as "American"
  - American English, the set of varieties of the English language native to the United States
  - Native Americans in the United States, indigenous peoples of the United States
- American, something of, from, or related to the Americas, also known as "America"
  - Indigenous peoples of the Americas
- American (word), for analysis and history of the meanings in various contexts

American(s) may also refer to:

== Organizations ==
- American Airlines, U.S.-based airline headquartered in Fort Worth, Texas
- American Conference (NCAA), an American college athletic conference
- American Recordings (record label), previously known as Def American
- American University, in Washington, D.C.

== Sports teams and leagues ==
=== Soccer ===
- Baltimore Americans, the name of two soccer teams, one from 1939 to 1942 and one from 1942 to 1948
- Chicago Americans, in 1972
- Dallas Americans, from 1983 to 1985
- Hartford Americans, from 1927 to 1928
- Miami Americans, a reincarnation of the New Jersey Americans in 1980
- New Jersey Americans (soccer), from 1976 to 1979
- New York Americans (soccer), from 1931 to 1956
- Uhrik Truckers, known from 1941 to 1953 as the Philadelphia Americans

=== Hockey ===
- Allen Americans, a minor league hockey team
- New York Americans, an ice hockey team from 1925 to 1942
- Rochester Americans, a minor league ice hockey franchise in the American Hockey League (AHL)
- Seattle Totems, an ice hockey team known from 1955 to 1958 as the Seattle Americans
- Tri-City Americans, a junior ice hockey team

=== Baseball ===
- Boston Red Sox, known from 1901 until 1907 as the Boston Americans
- Nashville Americans, an 1885–1886 minor league baseball team
- American League, a professional baseball league organized in 1901
- American Association (disambiguation), a name used by several professional baseball leagues

=== Basketball ===
- Brooklyn Nets, known in the 1960s as the New York Americans and New Jersey Americans
- Oakland Oaks (ABA), known briefly in 1967 as the Oakland Americans

=== American football ===
- Pittsburgh Americans, from 1936 until 1937
- New York Yankees (1940 AFL), known as the New York Americans in 1941

== Vehicles ==
- American (1899 automobile), by American Automobile Company, New York City
- American (1902 automobile), by American Motor Carriage Company, Cleveland
- American (1911 automobile), by American Automobile Manufacturing Company founded in Missouri
- American (1914 automobile), by American Cyclecar Company, Michigan
- American (1917 automobile), built in New Jersey
- American Motors Corporation (AMC), automobile manufacturing company (1954–1988)
- Rambler American, a compact line of cars by American Motors Corporation (1958–1969)
- USS American, several ships of the US Navy
- 4-4-0, a classification of railway locomotive described as the American type

== Music ==
- American (album), a 2017 studio album by RuPaul
- "American", a song by Fish Karma
- "American" (Lana Del Rey song), 2012
- AmericanEP, an extended play album by English electronica duo The Chemical Brothers
- American Quartet (Dvořák), a string quartet by Antonín Dvořák

== Places ==
- American Canyon, a city in Northern California
- American Falls (disambiguation)
- American Lake, Washington
- American River (disambiguation)
- American Township, Ohio
- American Township, a former township in Sacramento County, California

== Other uses ==
- American cheese, a type of processed cheese
- American McGee (born 1972), American video game designer
- "American" (RuPaul's Drag Race), a television episode

== See also ==
- All American (disambiguation)
- America (disambiguation)
- Americana (disambiguation)
- Armorican (disambiguation)
- The American (disambiguation)
- The Americans (disambiguation)
- List of automobile manufacturers of the United States
- American Made (disambiguation)
- Pan-American (disambiguation)
- Anti-American
- Organization of American States
