= Super Duty =

Super Duty may refer to:

- Ford Super Duty line of trucks
- Ford Super Duty engine line of truck engines
- An engine variant of the Pontiac Firebird
