= Blue Bird Wanderlodge =

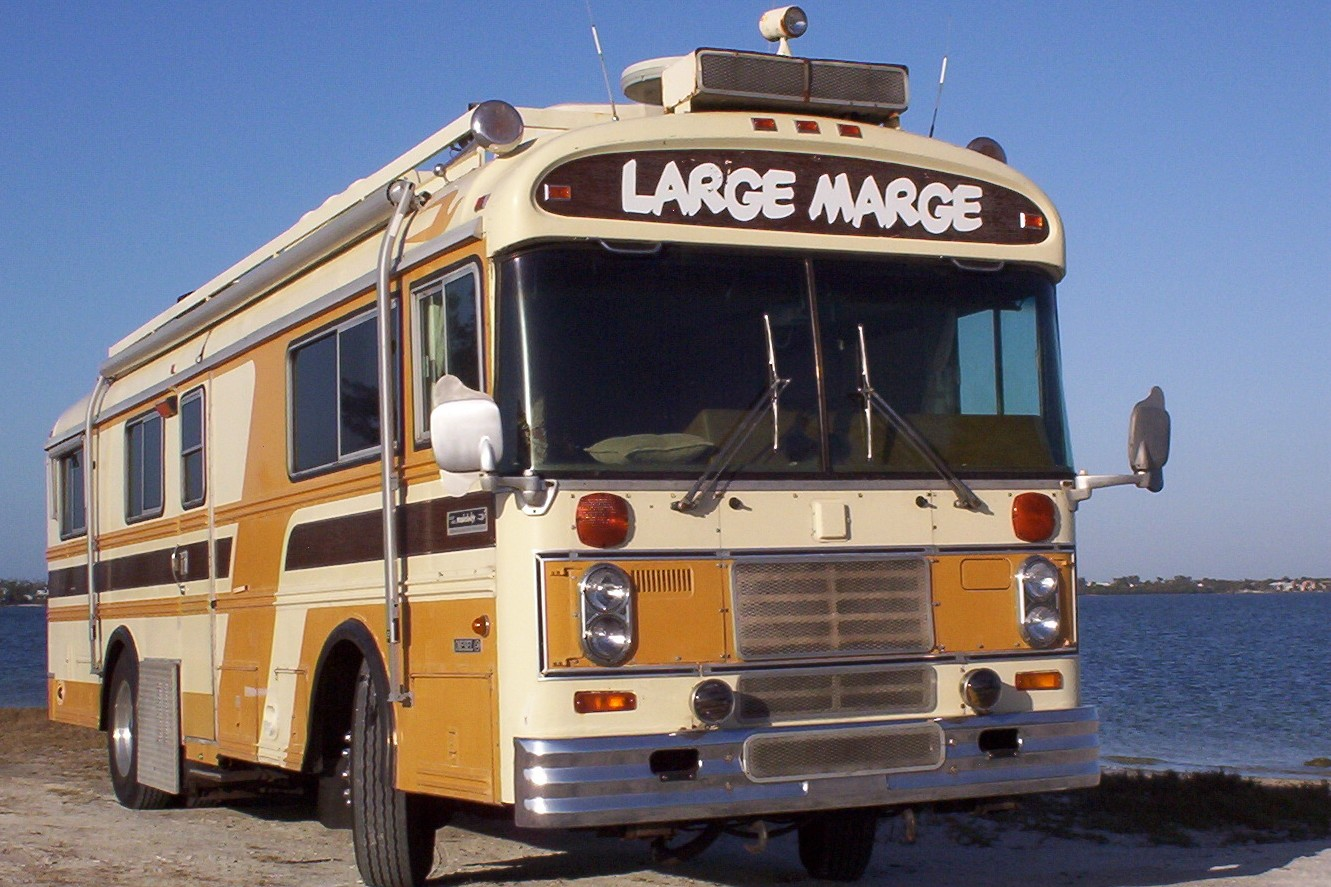
- "Large Marge" a 1980 Blue Bird Wanderlodge FC33 on Sanibel Island Causeway, Florida

Overview
- Type: Luxury recreational vehicle
- Manufacturer: Blue Bird Body Company (1963–1992); Blue Bird Corporation (1992–2007); Complete Coach Works (2007–2009)
- Also called: Blue Bird Transit Home (1963-1967)
- Production: 1963–2009
- Assembly: Fort Valley, Georgia
- Designer: Blue Bird Corporation

Body and chassis
- Class: Class A
- Layout: Front-engine 4×2; Rear-engine 4×2; Rear-engine 6×4
- Platform: Blue Bird
- Related: Blue Bird All American (1957-1988); Blue Bird LTC

Powertrain
- Engine: Gasoline; Diesel
- Transmission: Automatic

Dimensions
- Length: 31'–45'
- Width: 96"–102"

Wanderlodge is a retired series of recreational vehicles built by American bus manufacturer Blue Bird Body Company (now Blue Bird Corporation). Introduced as the Blue Bird Transit Home in 1963, the Wanderlodge was a derivative of the Blue Bird All American school bus for over year; two further generations were produced, adapting motorcoach body and chassis design.

Assembled by Blue Bird in Fort Valley, Georgia, each example of the Wanderlodge was built to customer specification. In contrast to Blue Bird school buses, no two Wanderlodges were alike; each example was assembled with a hand-crafted interior, with over 200 available options (with some examples adding additional customization). Through much of its first generation, the Wanderlodge was priced similarly to a medium-sized American home (dependent on customization); later examples were priced significantly higher than that, competing against coaches from Newell and Prevost. Highly prized by their owners, many were sold to middle/upper-class families, and some to celebrities and heads of state around the world.

As part of a reorganization of Blue Bird Corporation, the rights to the Wanderlodge model line were sold in 2007; production ended in 2009 after 44 continuous years.

== Background ==
By the early 1960s, Blue Bird Body Company had expanded from its beginnings in rural Georgia to become the fourth-largest manufacturer of school buses in the United States. While leading the segment, in looking towards the future, Blue Bird company management sought to diversify product offerings beyond school buses. As motorhomes began to evolve from travel trailers in the late 1950s and early 1960s, the company saw an opportunity to design its own vehicle.

In 1963, Blue Bird designed the Blue Bird Transit Home prototype, derived from the Blue Bird All American. Assembled by newly created subsidiary Cardinal Manufacturing in Fort Valley, Georgia, the 1963 Transit Home was a promotional vehicle, driven throughout the United States by company employees for two years to campgrounds and RV parks. The tour received little attention, with Blue Bird nearly deciding to shelve the concept of producing a motorhome altogether. In 1965, House Beautiful magazine published an article about the Transit Home; soon after, the company secured five orders for the $12,000 vehicle (approximately $96,760 in 2018 dollars).

A central feature of the design of the vehicle was its body commonality with the Blue Bird All American school bus. In contrast to a motorhome, the All American subjected its heavy-duty frame to stop-and-go driving on a daily basis (Blue Bird had built school buses with all-steel bodies since 1937). The prototype also offered several features unseen before in a motorhome, including a built-in safe, redundant heating and hot water systems that used electricity, engine heat or diesel, and fuel tanks offering a driving range in excess of 1,000 kilometres (620 mi).

== First generation (1963–1990) ==
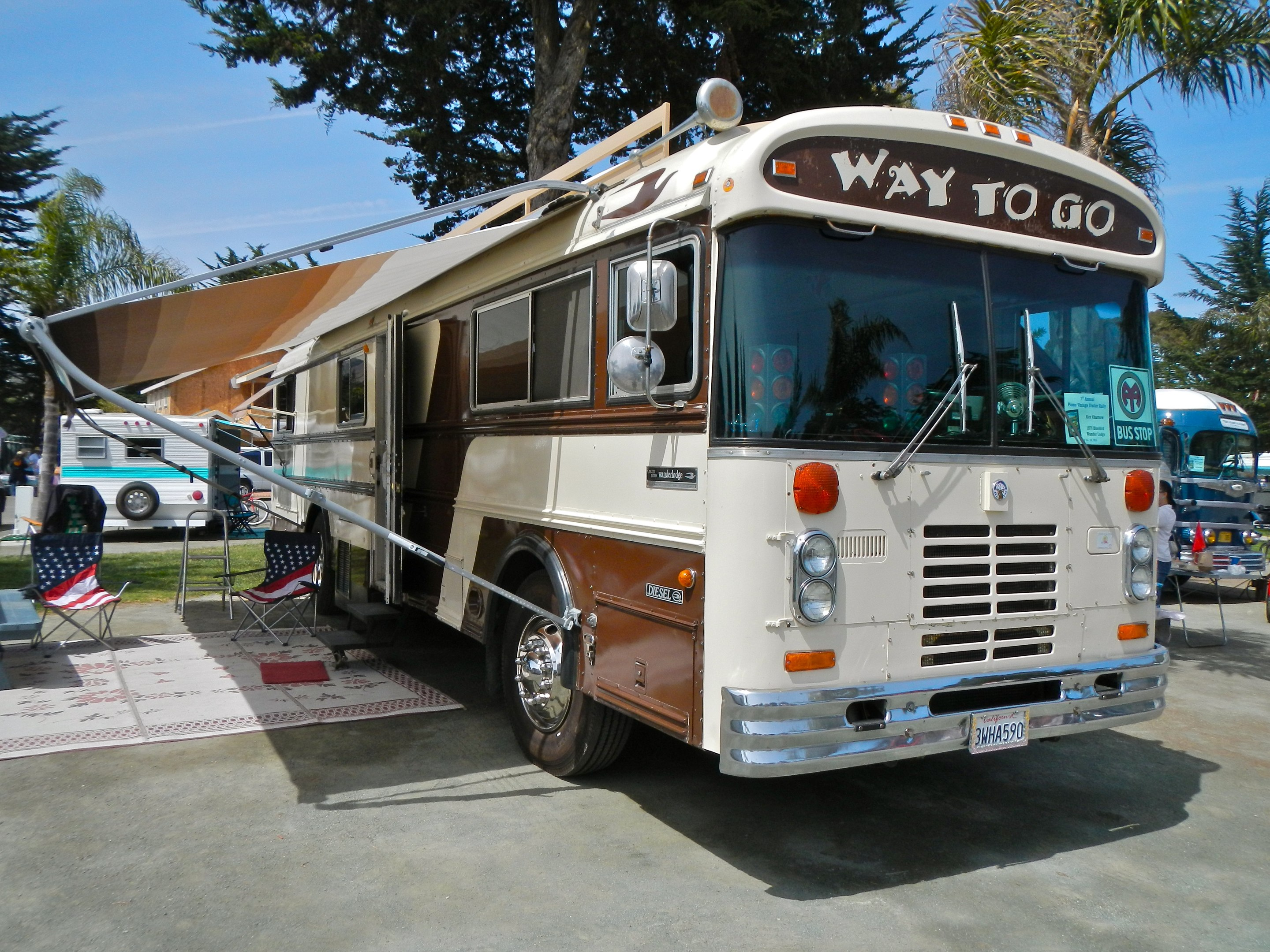
"Way To Go", a 1979 Blue Bird Wanderlodge set up for camping.

Prior to full production there were a series of 5 to 10 Wanderlodge prototypes built in 1964-65. One of the first prototypes, Body #73145 Serial #2634, is still viable, having been repaired/restored 2017-2019. It is on the road full-time with the original (rebuilt) GM 348W gas engine, and 5-speed manual transmission. The original paint scheme of this specific issue was/is White/Panama Blue. The chassis was built in Flint MI, shipped to Terrytown PA for additional work, then on to Bluebird at Fort Valley GA, where the body and interior was installed.

After the first five orders for the Wanderlodge were completed in 1965, Blue Bird began full-scale production of the Wanderlodge in 1965. Derived from the All American Forward Engine, the Wanderlodge was produced in a 31-foot body length, powered by a Ford Super Duty V8. Along with the availability of customer-specified paint color (as school bus yellow was illegal on recreational vehicles), the Transit Home differed from the All American in its use of a center-mounted entry door.

For 1968, several changes were made, as Blue Bird changed the name of its motorhome from Transit Home to Wanderlodge (a slight portmanteau of wanderlust and lodge). The roofline of the bus saw a revision, adapting a flat front panel above the windshield; vertically stacked headlights were added to the front fascia.

For 1969, nine 35-foot long rear-engine Wanderlodges were produced with the Super Duty V8 (among the rarest Wanderlodges ever built). In the 1970s, while the Wanderlodge remained a front-engine vehicle, 33-foot and 35-foot body lengths were introduced (in 1974 and 1975, respectively). For 1977, to improve the fuel economy and performance of the vehicle, Blue Bird introduced the Caterpillar 3208 diesel V8 as an option, with the 3208 replacing the Ford gasoline V8s entirely after 1978.

For 1979, to mark the fifteenth anniversary of the Wanderlodge, the 1979-only XV model was introduced. Based on the 35-foot forward-engine configuration, the XV differed in its use of double frame rails.

In 1982, Blue Bird introduced a production rear-engine Wanderlodge, produced in 35 and 40-foot lengths. Powered by a Detroit Diesel 6V92 engine, the rear-engine Wanderlodge was fitted with a rear tag axle. Along with the use of a tag axle and a rear engine configuration, the rear-engine Wanderlodge was externally distinguished by horizontally mounted headlights and a taller body height, as it used a double-rail frame (introduced by the 1979 Wanderlodge XV). As part of the introduction, Blue Bird redesignated the Wanderlodge model line, with Wanderlodge FCxx denoting the forward-engine model and its body-length and PTxx denoting the rear-engine model and its body length.

For 1983, Wanderlodge FC models added a second standard floor plan, adding a rear-mounted bathroom (RB) in place of the mid-ship configuration (SB) which was standard since its introduction (note that some earlier models from approximately 1978-1983 had optional rear bath units); the configuration was offered on 33 and 35-foot lengths. To further improve the performance of the FC, the naturally aspirated Cat 3208 was replaced by a turbocharged version, increasing output to 225 hp (250 hp before the closure of the model year). A third version of the PT was introduced, adding a 38-foot length alongside the 35 and 40-foot versions.

Through the 1980s, the Blue Bird Wanderlodge underwent a series of gradual updates. In 1986, the PT line was revised, with the addition of a 8V92 Detroit Diesel as an option; the PT35 was extended in length, becoming the PT36.

1987 marked a transitional year for the Wanderlodge exterior design. While the lower front fascia was redesigned, marking the introduction of rectangular headlamps and a redesigned grille (covering nearly the entire front fascia on the FC), the roof caps were shared with the All American for the last time. In an effort to de-emphasize the school bus origins of the Wanderlodge, for 1988, on rear-engine models, the metal roof caps were replaced with fiberglass versions (allowing for a more rounded appearance).

During the 1980s, federal law restricted school buses to maximum width of 96 inches (2.4 m), while motorcoaches were allowed their present-day width of 102 inches (2.6 m). To better compete against more recently introduced designs, for 1988, Blue Bird introduced a 102-inch "Wide Body Pusher". While based on the standard 96" Wanderlodge PT, the Wanderlodge Wide Body Pusher shared virtually no resemblance to the All American or TC/2000, with aerodynamic roof caps and redesigned bumpers (specific to the Wanderlodge).

While the use of a school bus body for the Wanderlodge provided for fairly conservative exterior design (depending on owner configuration), Blue Bird marketed the vehicle based on its high specifications and high degree of customization, built entirely to order. By the end of the 1980s, a Wanderlodge was available with nearly 200 standard options. Along with the common bedroom and bathroom (fitted with a bathtub), the Wanderlodge could be fitted with full kitchen, a gas grill, a doorbell, and a central vacuum system; a popular option among owners was a programmable horn with 60 different sounds. From the initial $12,000 at its introduction, depending on version, the base price had risen to $199,000-$350,000 (approximately $441,110-775,822 in 2018); the custom-built nature of the Wanderlodge could allow owners to nearly double the purchase price in options and custom specifications. While also purchased by celebrity owners and heads of state, Blue Bird found that the name of the vehicle was chosen well; many Wanderlodge purchasers were couples with the funds to afford the purchase and a high desire to travel the country by road.

For 1989, Blue Bird revised its rear-engine lineup, with the introduction of a 36-foot long single-axle pusher (Wanderlodge SP), and only the Wide Body Pusher versions of the Wanderlodge PT remained in production. After 23 years in production, 1989 marked the final year of the forward-control Wanderlodge (alongside the generation of the Blue Bird All American it was derived from, introduced in 1957). In terms of size, the FC was replaced by the SP, which continued the use of the Caterpillar 3208 diesel.

=== Model designations ===
- Blue Bird Wanderlodge Prototype 1964-1965
- Blue Bird Transit Home (1963, 1965-1967)
- Blue Bird Wanderlodge/Wanderlodge FC (1968-1989)
- Blue Bird Wanderlodge XV (1979)
- Blue Bird Wanderlodge PT (1982-1992)
- Blue Bird Wanderlodge SP (1989-1992)
- Blue Bird Wanderlodge Wide Body Pusher (1988-1990)

== Second generation (1991–1997) ==
By the end of the 1980s, the design of the Blue Bird Wanderlodge had entered a period of struggle. While its chassis derived from the Blue Bird All American and all-steel body allowed for a high degree of durability and a reputation of quality, along with its 96" inch width, elements of its design had begun to fall behind designs introduced in the 1980s, including luxury motorhomes based on intercity motorcoaches. While the reputation of the Wanderlodge for hand-built quality and customization remained marketable, Blue Bird sought to shift the design away from that of the All American and TC/2000.

For 1991, both the SP and Wide Body Pusher underwent an extensive redesign; with the exception of Blue Bird badging, virtually all visual ties to the All American were removed from the design. Along with redesigned body caps, the front and rear bumpers were updated with the introduction of body-color bumper covers. 1992 marked the final year of the Wanderlodge SP, as Wanderlodge production shifted to 102" wide vehicles.

In 1994, to enter the single-axle rear-engine Class A motorhome segment, Blue Bird introduced the BMC (Blue Bird Motor Coach). While not marketed under the Wanderlodge name, the 37-foot BMC was built in the same factory as the Wanderlodge. In line with the wide-body Wanderlodge, the BMC was produced with a 102" wide body; unlike all previous Blue Bird motorhomes, BMCs had a chassis produced by custom chassis manufacturer Spartan Motors of Michigan (a company which also had school bus chassis manufacturing).

In the mid-1990s, the Wanderlodge model line underwent a slight revision. For 1995, a 42-foot Wanderlodge was introduced (the longest ever), with a 40-foot tag-axle version of the BMC introduced in 1996; in 1997, both versions of the Wanderlodge were extended a foot in length (to 41 and 43 feet, respectively).

=== Model designations ===
- Blue Bird Wanderlodge SP (1991-1992)
- Blue Bird Wanderlodge Wide Body Pusher (1991-1997)
- Blue Bird/Spartan Motors BMC (1994-1997)

== Third generation (1998–2009) ==
For the end of the 1990s, Blue Bird introduced a third generation of the Wanderlodge. Coinciding with the withdrawal of the Spartan-chassis BMC, the 1991-generation Wanderlodge was completely redesigned from the ground up. In 1997, Blue Bird introduced its first intercity motorcoach, the LTC-40, forming the basis of the third-generation Wanderlodge. Two versions were produced: the 40-foot long LX and the LXi (offered in 41 and 43-foot lengths); the LX was powered by a Cummins M11 diesel, while the LXi was produced with a Detroit Diesel Series 60 engine. Parked next to a 1997 Wanderlodge, the LX and LXi were visually distinguished by a much larger windshield; the LX was fitted with the four halogen headlamps of the LTC-40 while the LXi used a system of projector-beam headlamps. As an industry first, the 1998 Blue Bird Wanderlodge LXi was among the first motorcoaches fitted with slide-out expansions.

For 2001, the exterior of the Wanderlodge underwent an update for the last time. Along with a shared headlight design for the LX and LXi, the design better integrated the front bumper into the body. For 2002, slide-outs were standardized across the model range, with one or two offered for the body.

For 2003, to return to the single-axle segment, Blue Bird introduced the Wanderlodge M380, effectively replacing the Blue Bird BMC. Produced entirely by Blue Bird Wanderlodge, the M380 was a 38-foot single-axle pusher motorcoach with a Cummins ISL diesel engine; in line with the LX and LXi, the M380 also was produced with slide-outs. In 2004, the model nomenclature of the Blue Bird Wanderlodge was revised. In line with the M380, the LXi was renamed the M450 LXi, with a 45-foot length becoming the sole configuration of the LXi.

=== Model designations ===
- Blue Bird Wanderlodge LX (1998-2003)
- Blue Bird Wanderlodge LXi/M450LXi (1998-2009)
- Blue Bird Wanderlodge M380 (2003-2009)

== End of production ==
From the 1990s to the 2000s, the ownership of Blue Bird underwent a significant transition, changing from family-based ownership to ownership by capital management firms to transportation conglomerates, changing hands twice by 2006. While the company itself was under sound financial footing, financial issues of its various parent companies placed Blue Bird under an uncertain future during the early 2000s. In an effort to remain competitive, Blue Bird concentrated all production on its school bus product lines, withdrawing from motorcoach production and ending production of its transit buses. Forming the basis of the Blue Bird Wanderlodge LX and LXi, the Blue Bird LTC-40 motorcoach was withdrawn in 2003.

To further concentrate its resources on school bus production, in 2007, Blue Bird put its Wanderlodge motorcoach division for sale. The division, production facility, and the rights to the Wanderlodge name were sold to Complete Coach Works, a California-based company that specialized in bus refurbishing and manufacturing. The Wanderlodge M380 and M450LXi continued production, with the removal of the Blue Bird company name.

In April 2009, Complete Coach Works ended production of the Wanderlodge model line, closing down the assembly facility in Fort Valley, Georgia.

Blue Bird Wanderlodge Timeline, 1963–2009
Production		1960s							1970s										1980s										1990s										2000s
Production		'63	'64	'65	'66	'67	'68	'69	'70	'71	'72	'73	'74	'75	'76	'77	'78	'79	'80	'81	'82	'83	'84	'85	'86	'87	'88	'89	'90	'91	'92	'93	'94	'95	'96	'97	'98	'99	'00	'01	'02	'03	'04	'05	'06	'07	'08	'09
Manufacturer		Blue Bird Body Company/Blue Bird Corporation																																												Complete Coach Works
Conventional		Blue Bird Inn
Front engine		Blue Bird Transit Home					Wanderlodge Forward Control/FC
Rear-engine	Single-axle																											Wanderlodge SP					BMC (Blue Bird Motor Coach)										Wanderlodge M380
Rear-engine	Tandem-axle																				Wanderlodge PT
Rear-engine	Tandem-axle																										Wanderlodge Wide Body Pusher			Wanderlodge Wide Body Pusher							Wanderlodge LX/LXi/M450LXi

== Variants ==
=== Blue Bird Inn ===
Alongside the Blue Bird Transit Home and Wanderlodge, Blue Bird offered a second motorhome designed around the same concept. Based on a conventional-chassis bus body, the Blue Bird Inn was intended as a lower-priced entry model. However, due to low sales, the Blue Bird Inn was discontinued in the early 1970s.

=== Blue Bird QMC ===
Based on the 1994-1998 Blue Bird/Spartan Wanderlodge BMC, the Blue Bird QMC was used as a coach marketed to business users seeking a mobile command center or hospitality suite. Essentially a business jet on wheels, the QMC featured an on-board kitchen and a reconfigurable interior designed for business presentations.

== Powertrain ==
=== Gasoline ===
Ford

- Ford Super Duty V8 (391 to 534 cubic inches)

=== Diesel ===
Caterpillar

- Caterpillar 3208 (NA or turbocharged) V8
- Caterpillar C13
- Caterpillar C15

Cummins

- Cummins M11/ISM

Detroit Diesel

- 6V92
- 8V92
- Series 60
