= An American =

An American may be the pseudonym of:

- Samuel Adams (1722–1803), American statesman
- William Cobbett (1763–1835), English journalist
- James Fenimore Cooper, American novelist
- Alexander Hamilton (1757–1804), American lawyer and statesman
- Henry Wadsworth Longfellow, American poet

== See also ==
- American (disambiguation)
- An American Gentleman, pseudonym of Washington Irving
