= Blue Bird All American =

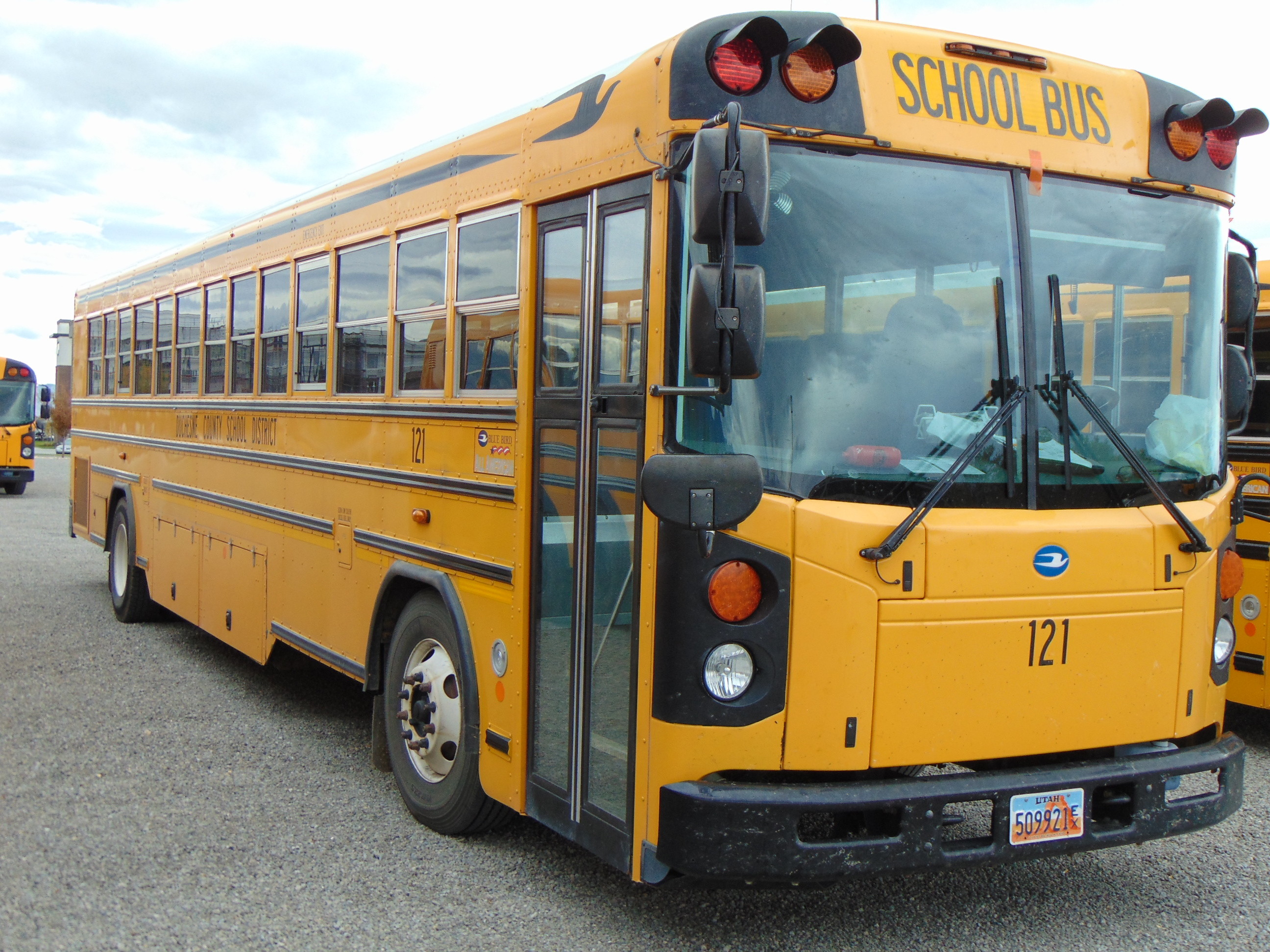
- Blue Bird All American D3RE (2010-2014)

Overview
- Manufacturer: Blue Bird Body Company (1949–1992); Blue Bird Corporation (1992–present)
- Production: 1949–present
- Assembly: United States: Fort Valley, Georgia (Blue Bird Body Company)

Body and chassis
- Class: School bus
- Body style: Body-on-frame (1948-1951); Monocoque stressed skin (1952-present)
- Floor type: High floor
- Chassis: Forward engine: Blue Bird (1952–present); Rear engine: Various (to 1988); Blue Bird (1988–present)
- Related: Blue Bird Wanderlodge; Blue Bird TC/2000

The Blue Bird All American is a series of buses produced by American school bus manufacturer Blue Bird Corporation (originally Blue Bird Body Company). In production since 1949, the model line is the longest-assembled commercial vehicle line in the world, currently in its sixth generation (introduced for 2014). Originally developed as a yellow school bus, additional versions of the All American have been designed for a wide variety of applications, ranging from the Blue Bird Wanderlodge luxury motorhome to buses for law enforcement use.

While the All American was not the first school bus designed with a transit-style body design (with a flat-front body, placing the front axle behind the entry door), the model line popularized the body design in North America, with many competitive manufacturers introducing similar designs. Since 1952, Blue Bird has used a proprietary chassis for the All American, a practice later used for its TC/2000 and Vision model lines (and their derivatives). Originally produced as a front-engine vehicle, the All American has also been produced as a rear-engine vehicle since 1961.

Since 1949, Blue Bird has sourced production of the All American nearly entirely from its facility in Fort Valley, Georgia. From the 1960s to the 1980s, the model line was also produced in South America, using locally sourced chassis.

== Development ==
=== 1930s ===
In the 1930s, to expand student seating capacity in school buses, manufacturers developed "forward control" school buses. By modifying conventional truck chassis, the engine was placed next to the driver and the front axle moved rearward of the entrance door. This allowed for the use of greater capacity within the same overall length and better forward visibility; the shorter wheelbase gave them improved maneuverability.

In 1932, Crown Coach introduced the Supercoach alongside a similar design by Wayne Works; Gillig introduced a design with a rear-mounted engine. In 1937, the Crown Supercoach was expanded to a capacity of 79 passengers, becoming one of the largest school buses of its time.

=== 1940s ===
In the years following World War II, Blue Bird company founder A.L. Luce sought to develop his own forward control bus. In 1948, during a trip to Europe, he and his son George visited the Paris Auto Salon. One of the vehicles on display was a front-engine motorcoach (either Van Hool or Jonckheere bodywork) with a General Motors chassis built in an Opel factory in Belgium.

Inspired by the design, A.L. Luce sought to develop uses for the chassis as a school bus; however, the Luces learned that it was a model specifically for export markets. In an effort to reverse-engineer the vehicle, A.L. Luce purchased the Paris Auto coach from the body manufacturer in order to ship it to Blue Bird in Fort Valley, Georgia. Moving past the bodywork, Blue Bird engineers found that the Opel chassis shared much in common with Chevrolet medium-duty trucks converted to forward-control; the front axle was widened and modifications were made to the steering gear. In a unique feature, the transmission was shifted by remote control.

Due to its design commonality with the export Opel chassis, Blue Bird selected Chevrolet as the initial chassis for the forward-control prototype. The first prototype, named Blue Bird All American, was completed in 1949. Plagued by engineering issues, the All American did not enter full production until 1950.

== First generation (1950–1956) ==
First generation

Overview
- Manufacturer: Blue Bird Body Company
- Production: 1949-1956
- Assembly: Fort Valley, Georgia

Body and chassis
- Layout: front-engine 4x2
- Platform: Chevrolet/GMC (1949-1951); Blue Bird (1952-1956)

Powertrain
- Engine: Gasoline
- Transmission: Manual

Chronology
- Successor: Blue Bird All American (1957-1989)

For 1950, the All American entered full-scale production, deriving its design from the original prototype. Though the move to a Chevrolet/GMC chassis allowed for commonality with its conventional-chassis vehicles, its method of assembly hindered its production. To fit a chassis to an All American, Blue Bird had to strip the cowled-chassis frame bare and convert it to a forward-control layout before the body was mounted. Along with adding time to final assembly, the conversion process required that nearly every chassis component be rechecked for functionality.

To improve design quality and reduce the time of assembly, Blue Bird ended its use of second-party chassis for the All American in 1952 in an effort to develop its own design. Subsequently, every front-engine All American has utilized a Blue Bird chassis (rear-engine, since 1988); since 2008, all full-size Blue Bird buses use a proprietary chassis design. In a secondary change, Blue Bird expanded the range of engines for the All American beyond Chevrolet and GMC.

In the switch to the Blue Bird chassis, several changes were made to the body of the All American, with some remaining a part of the design today. In addition to a larger entryway and front door, the front roofline was extended forward several inches (with the windshield becoming nearly vertical); the rear bodywork became less rounded, with the side windows extending nearly the full length of the bus. The overall seating capacity of the All American was expanded, with the largest versions seating up to 72 passengers.

== Second generation (1957–1989) ==
Second generation
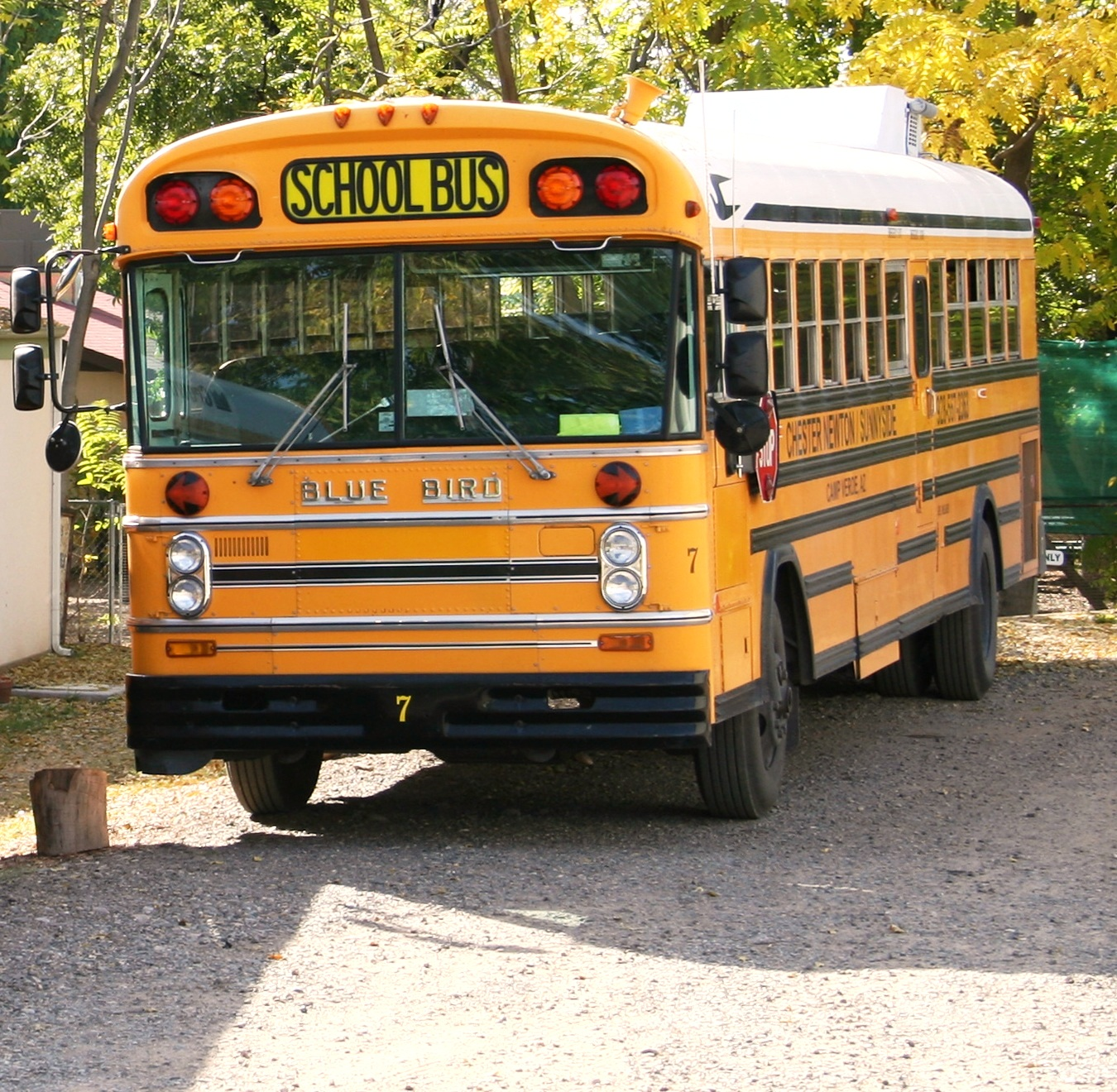
- Early 1980s All American Rear Engine

Overview
- Manufacturer: Blue Bird Body Company; Blue bird Centroamericana (Central america)
- Model years: 1957-1989
- Assembly: Fort Valley, Georgia; Guatemala City, Guatemala

Body and chassis
- Layout: front-engine 4x2 rear-engine 4x2
- Related: Blue Bird Wanderlodge

Powertrain
- Engine: Gasoline; Diesel
- Transmission: Manual; Automatic

Chronology
- Predecessor: Blue Bird All American (1952-1956)
- Successor: Blue Bird TC/2000; Blue Bird All American (1990-1999)

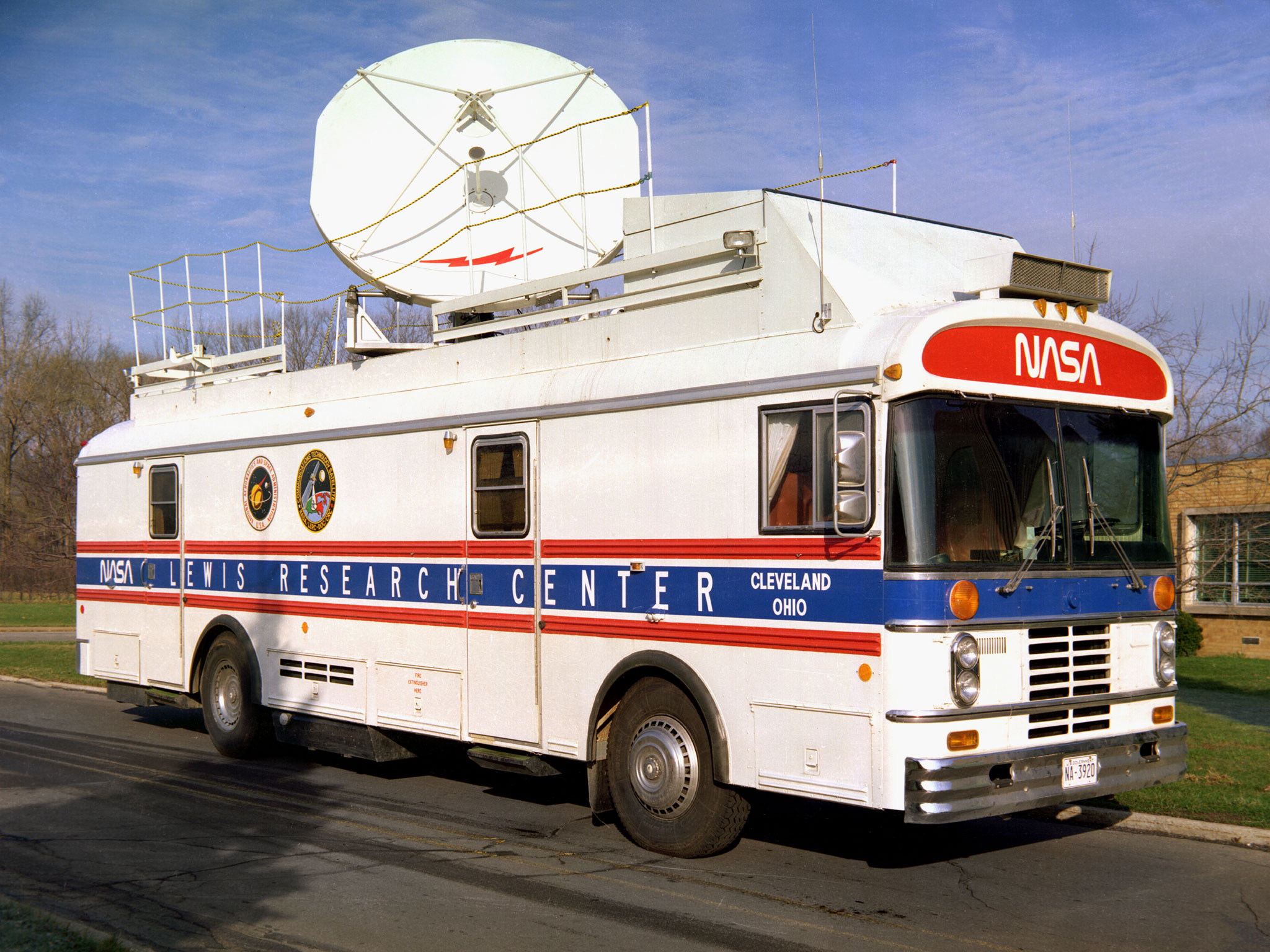
1977 Blue Bird in use by NASA as a mobile command center (Communications Technology Satellite)

For 1957, along with the Blue Bird Conventional, the body of the All American was given a ground-up redesign. To better accommodate older students and adult passengers walking inside the bus standing up, the roof was raised upward several inches, matched with flatter sides. The drivers' compartment was completely redesigned; to reduce blind spots, the entry door glass was enlarged and the windshield was made panoramic, nearly wrapping from the entry door to the driver window.

In 1958, after federal legislation permitted their use on road vehicles, quad headlights were added to the All American; in various forms, the All American would use quad headlights through 2013.

In 1961, Blue Bird expanded the All American product line by introducing a rear-engine "pusher" configuration. Developed largely to secure bids in areas where rear-engine buses were favored, Blue Bird initially outsourced the chassis for the All American Rear Engine to GMC. For 1962, to further improve forward visibility, the windshield was enlarged further, with two versions offered: a 4-pane flat glass version (standard) or a 2-pane curved glass (optional). For 1967, the roofline of the All American underwent a slight revision. To better accommodate the 8-lamp warning systems coming into use, the curved roof cap used since the 1930s was replaced by a flat, vertically-oriented design. For 1968, the bodywork below the windshield was revised, including a new (larger) grille, vertically-stacked headlamps, and a reduction of the amount of chrome trim.

During the 1970s, the All American underwent several changes; centered around compliance with the introduction of safety regulations, few changes were externally visible. To comply with regulations introduced for 1977 production, the body panels and internal structure were strengthened; as a passive restraint system, high-back padded passenger seats were added. To match the front roof cap, Blue Bird changed the rear roof cap to a vertical design (borrowing bodywork from the Wanderlodge).

In contrast to the first All Americans, which offered a maximum of 60-passenger seating, by the end of the 1970s, an All American could be equipped to seat 90 passengers. Alongside its rear-engine counterpart, the front-engine All American was sold with both gasoline and diesel engines. As an effect of the 1970s fuel crises, fuel economy concerns led to widespread adoption of diesel engines in high-capacity school buses.

The All American evolutionary changes during the 1980s, centered around updates to powertrain supplier. In 1981, Ford discontinued its Super Duty V8; the Chevrolet 427 cubic-inch V8 became the sole gasoline-powered engine offering. Alongside the rear-engine version, the front-engine All American was produced with diesel engines supplied by Caterpillar, Cummins, and Detroit Diesel. As a design change, in 1982, a drop-sash window was added to the rearmost row of seats, replacing a fixed pane of glass (available as an option for several years).

After using second-party chassis from multiple manufacturers since 1961, Blue Bird commenced production of a proprietary chassis for the rear-engine All American for 1988.

1957-1989 Blue Bird All American powertrain details
| Engine name | Production | Fuel |
|---|---|---|
| Chevrolet Mark IV V8 | 1965-1989 | Gasoline |
| Ford Super Duty V8 | c.1958-1981 | Gasoline |
| Caterpillar 1160 V8 Caterpillar 3208 V8 | 1970-1989 | Diesel |
| Cummins VT555 V8 | 1975-c.1985 | Diesel |
| Detroit Diesel 8.2L V8 | 1980-1989 | Diesel |

=== Design epilogue ===
In production for 32 years, the second-generation All American is among the longest-produced bus bodies in North American bus manufacturing history (outclassed by Crown, Gillig, and the GM New Look/Classic). With the exception of the All American D3-series and EC-72 prototypes, all full-size Blue Bird school buses produced since 1957 have derived much of their bodywork from the second-generation All American. While using a lighter-duty chassis and a different design for the driver compartment, the TC/2000 school bus also derives much of its bodywork from the second-generation All American. In various sizes, the windshield design introduced on the All American in 1962 was retained through 2013; it currently remains in use on the Vision.

Following the introduction of a rear-engine chassis for the All American in 1988, Blue Bird began a shift towards using company-produced chassis for all of its bodies; with the exception of the Micro Bird (based on a cutaway van), all Blue Bird vehicles are produced on proprietary chassis.

== Third generation (1989–1998) ==
Third generation
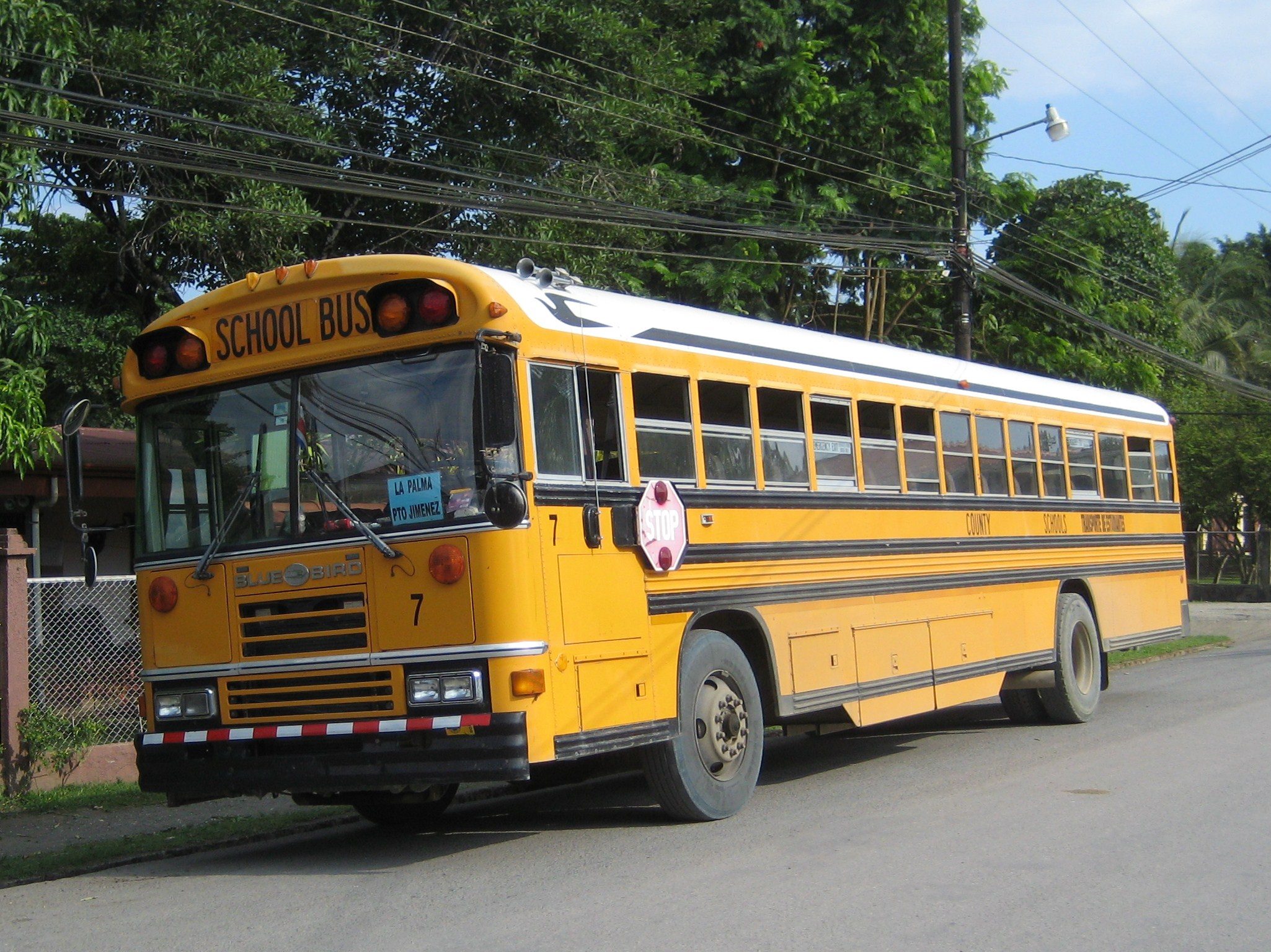
- 1992–1998 All American Forward Engine (retired, photo from Costa Rica)

Overview
- Also called: Blue Bird TC/3000 (export); Blue Bird CS
- Model years: 1989–1998
- Assembly: Fort Valley, Georgia

Body and chassis
- Layout: Front-engine 4x2 Rear-engine 4x2
- Related: Blue Bird TC/2000; Blue Bird APC; Blue Bird CS

Powertrain
- Engine: Diesel
- Transmission: Automatic

Chronology
- Predecessor: Blue Bird All American (1957–1989)
- Successor: Blue Bird All American (A3)

Introduced during 1989 production, the third-generation All American marked the most extensive changes to the model line since 1957. To modernize the All American for both drivers and mechanics, Blue Bird made multiple changes to the interior and the chassis of the bus. For the first time since 1967, horizontally-aligned headlamps returned to the exterior.

To streamline its production, much of the body was carried over from the previous generation (entirely so, above the window line). The drivers' compartment was completely redesigned, retaining only the windshield and driver-side window. The instrument panel was angled more vertically (to better face the driver), including more legible gauges; a modernized secondary control panel was adopted from the TC/2000.

While the redesign carried over the windshield (used since 1962), multiple changes were made to upgrade driver sightlines. Alongside the redesign of the dashboard, the entry door was redesigned with larger glass panels (a design later adopted by all Blue Bird buses). On front-engine buses, a less-obstructive engine cover design provided more room for both the driver and the front entry steps (the design remained much larger than that of the TC/2000, as the two model lines used different engines). To improve serviceability, the configuration of the front body panels was revised, allowing them to be removed for general maintenance without the use of tools.

In a major change, the third-generation All American introduced an entirely new powertrain range. In response to the manufacturer discontinuation of the previous V8 diesel engines, the model line adopted Cummins inline-6 diesels. The manual transmission and 7.0L gasoline V8 were dropped from the model line (theoretically remaining standard for the TC/2000).

| Engine name | Production | Fuel | Availability |
|---|---|---|---|
| Cummins B5.9 I6 | 1989-1998 | Diesel | Front engine |
| Cummins C8.3 I6 | 1989-1998 | Diesel | Both |
| Caterpillar 3116 | 1990-1998 | Diesel | Front engine |

To bring it in line with the TC/2000, Blue Bird rebranded export units of the model line as to Blue Bird TC/3000. Previously, Canadian exports (the largest market outside the United States) were re-branded as Blue Bird All Canadians. As with the previous generation, the 1990 All American would change little over its production run. 1990-1991 models are distinguished by widely spaced "Blue Bird" lettering below the windshield while 1992-1998 models are identified by narrowly spaced lettering (revised to fit on the center grille panel)

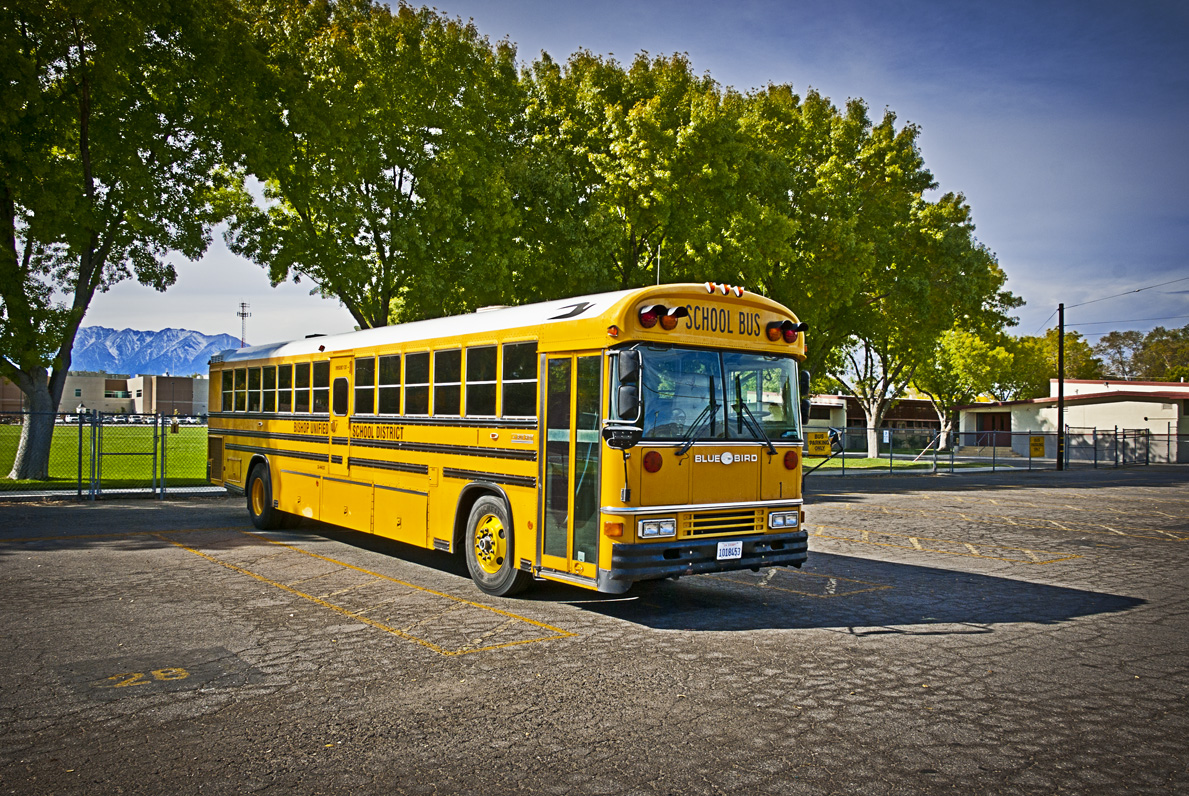
1992-1998 All American rear-engine (California)

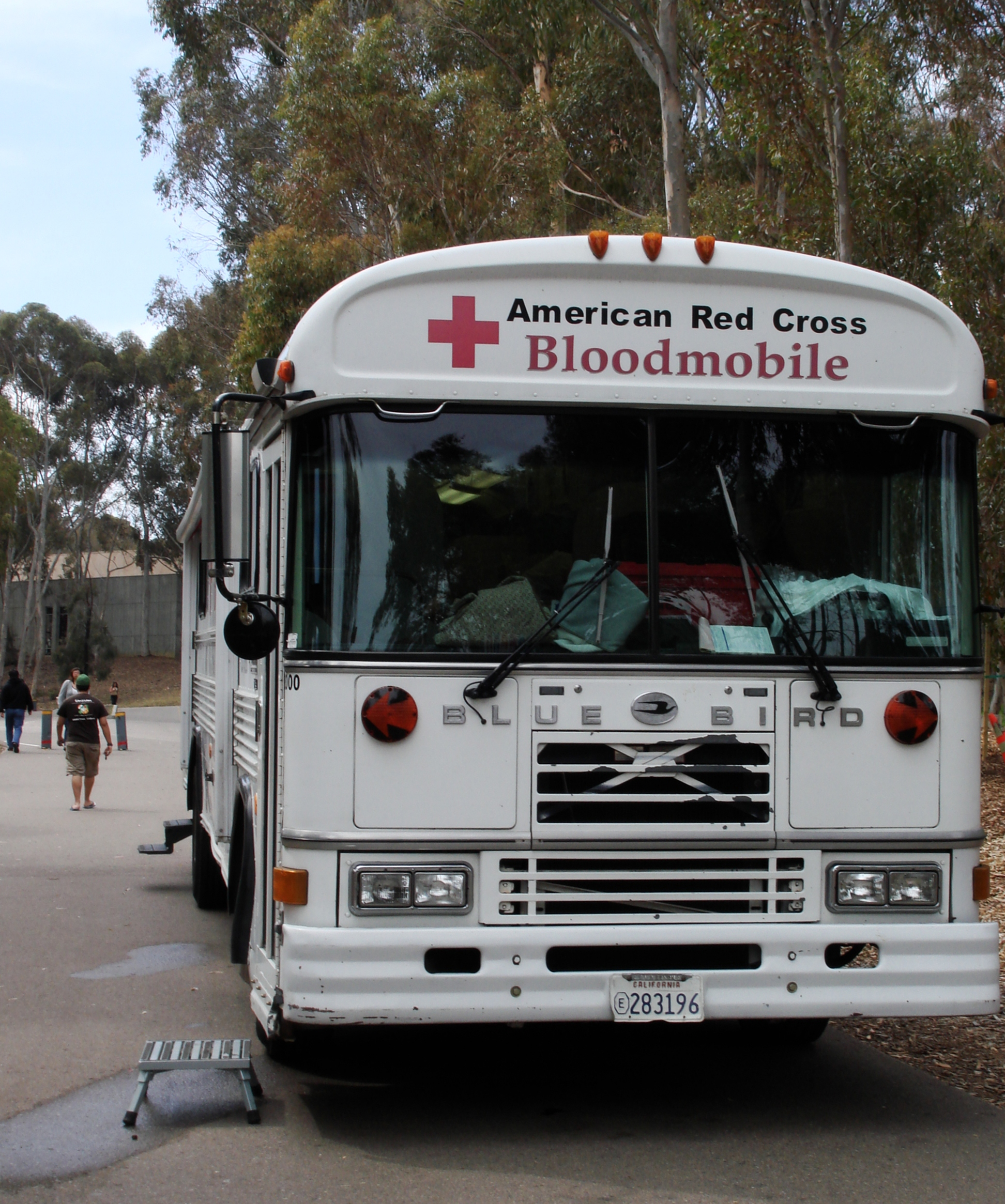
1989-1991 All American front-engine in use as a bloodmobile

Retired 1989-1991 All American front-engine (Costa Rica)

=== Alternative-fuel vehicles ===
In 1991, Blue Bird took part in a California Energy Commission program to develop modern, low-emissions school buses. Following the development of prototype derived from a GMC-chassis conventional, Blue Bird supplied 10 buses using a GMC engine converted to run on compressed natural gas. For subsequent phases of the program, the CNG buses were rear-engine TC/2000s, using engines supplied by John Deere.

== Fourth generation (1999–2013) ==
Fourth generation (A3)
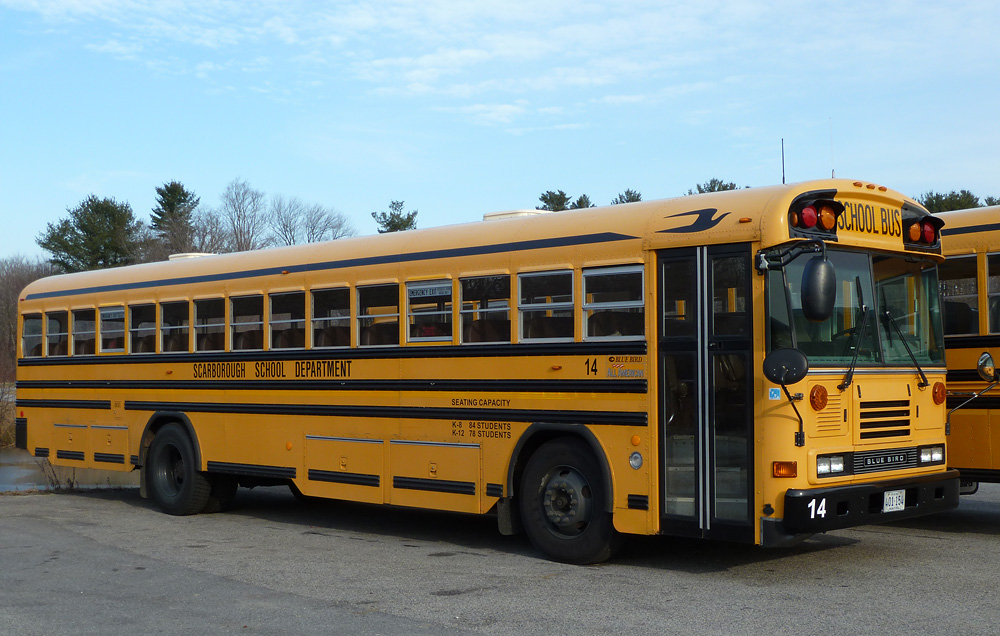

Overview
- Also called: Blue Bird TC/3000 (export)
- Production: 1998–2013
- Model years: FE:1999–2014; RE:1999–2013
- Assembly: Fort Valley, Georgia

Body and chassis
- Layout: Front-engine 4x2 Rear-engine 4x2
- Related: Blue Bird APC; Blue Bird CS

Powertrain
- Engine: Diesel; Compressed natural gas
- Transmission: Automatic

Chronology
- Predecessor: Blue Bird All American (1990–1999); Blue Bird TC/2000
- Successor: Blue Bird All American (D3); Blue Bird All American (T3)

For 1999, the fourth generation of the All American was introduced. Internally designated the "A3" series, the fourth generation marked a major structural revision to the model line, adopting a "drop-frame" chassis; on both configurations, the portion of the frame rails that supported the drivetrain were lowered in height. On front-engine buses, the drop-frame design further reduced the intrusion of engine cover. Externally distinguished by its redesigned (smaller) grille and headlamp housings, the A3 series retained the body structure of the previous generation, adding the larger windshield of the TC/2000. The front fascia was largely devoid of chrome trim (relegated to the "Blue Bird" badge between the headlamps and its surrounding imitation grille trim). The dashboard again went a complete redesign with updated instruments and controls; the TC/2000 adopted the design for 2000 production. The side door design was carried over, with a black-frame door becoming an option (later becoming standard).

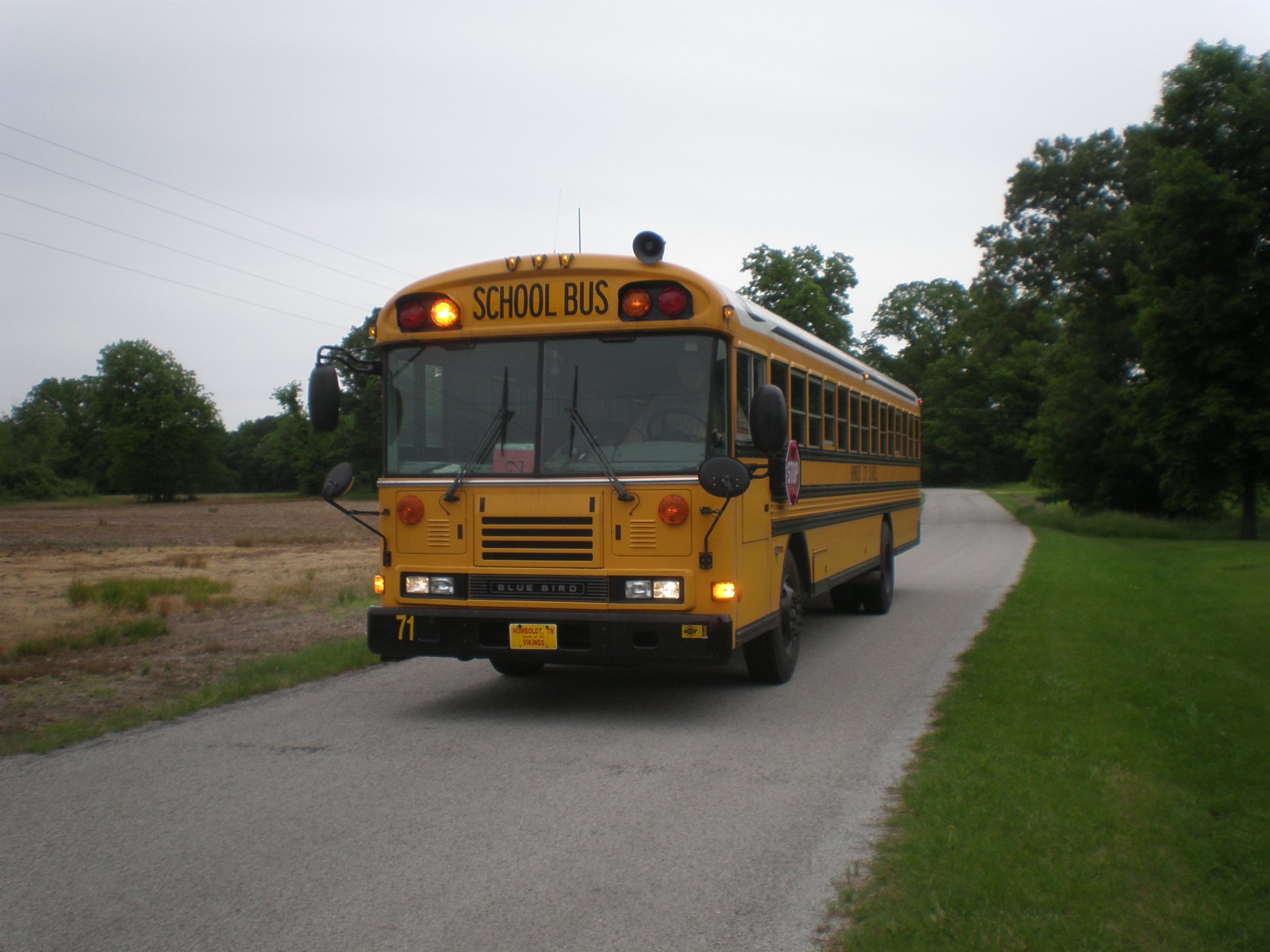
All American FE, showing warning lights

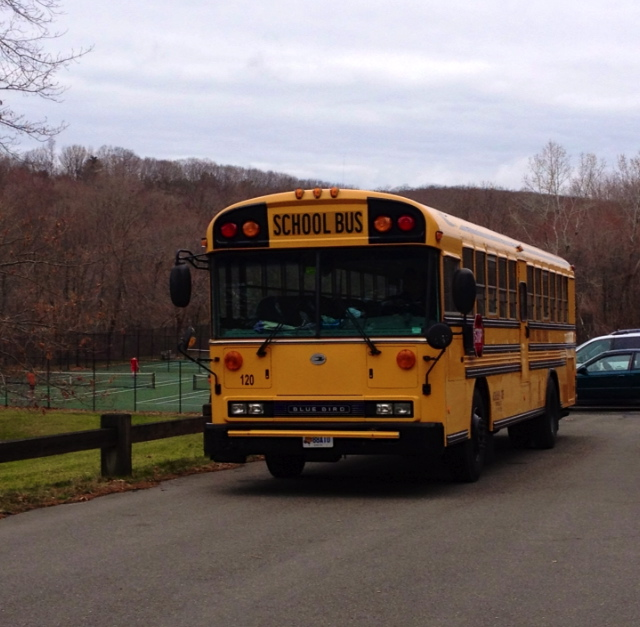
All American RE

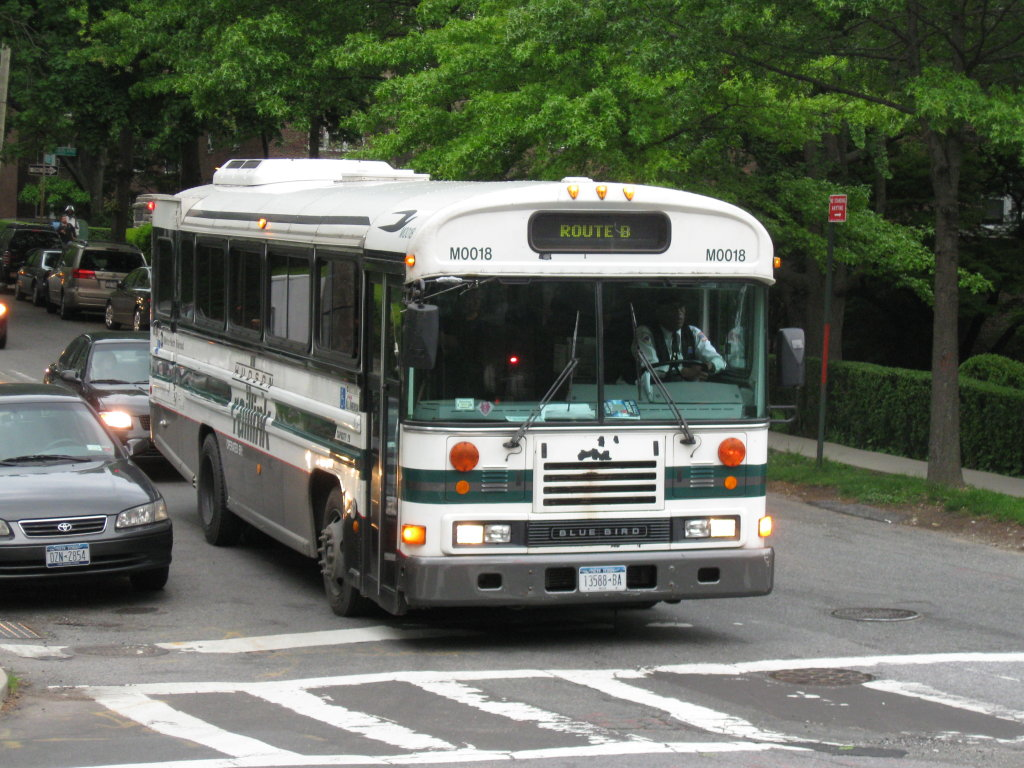
All American FE in use as transit bus

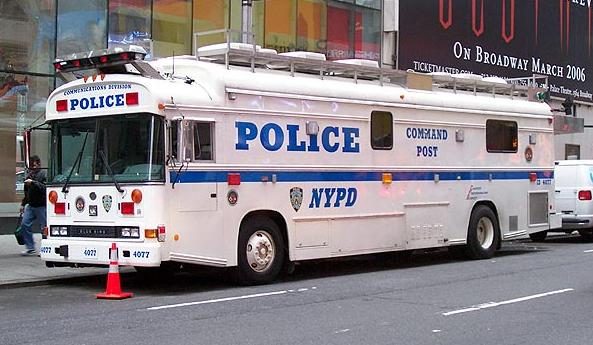
All American RE in use as police command center (NYPD)

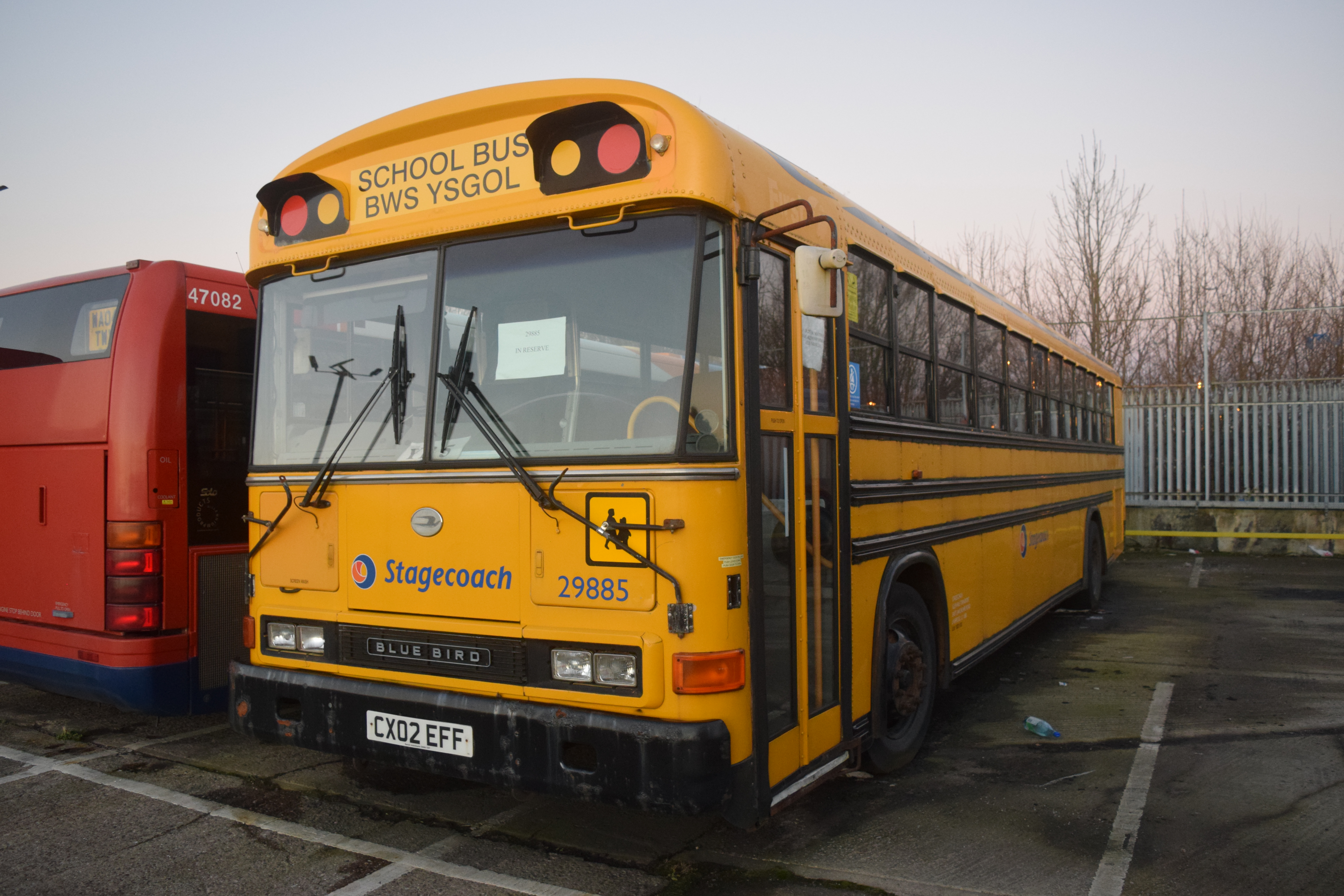
Right-hand drive All American RE exported to Wales

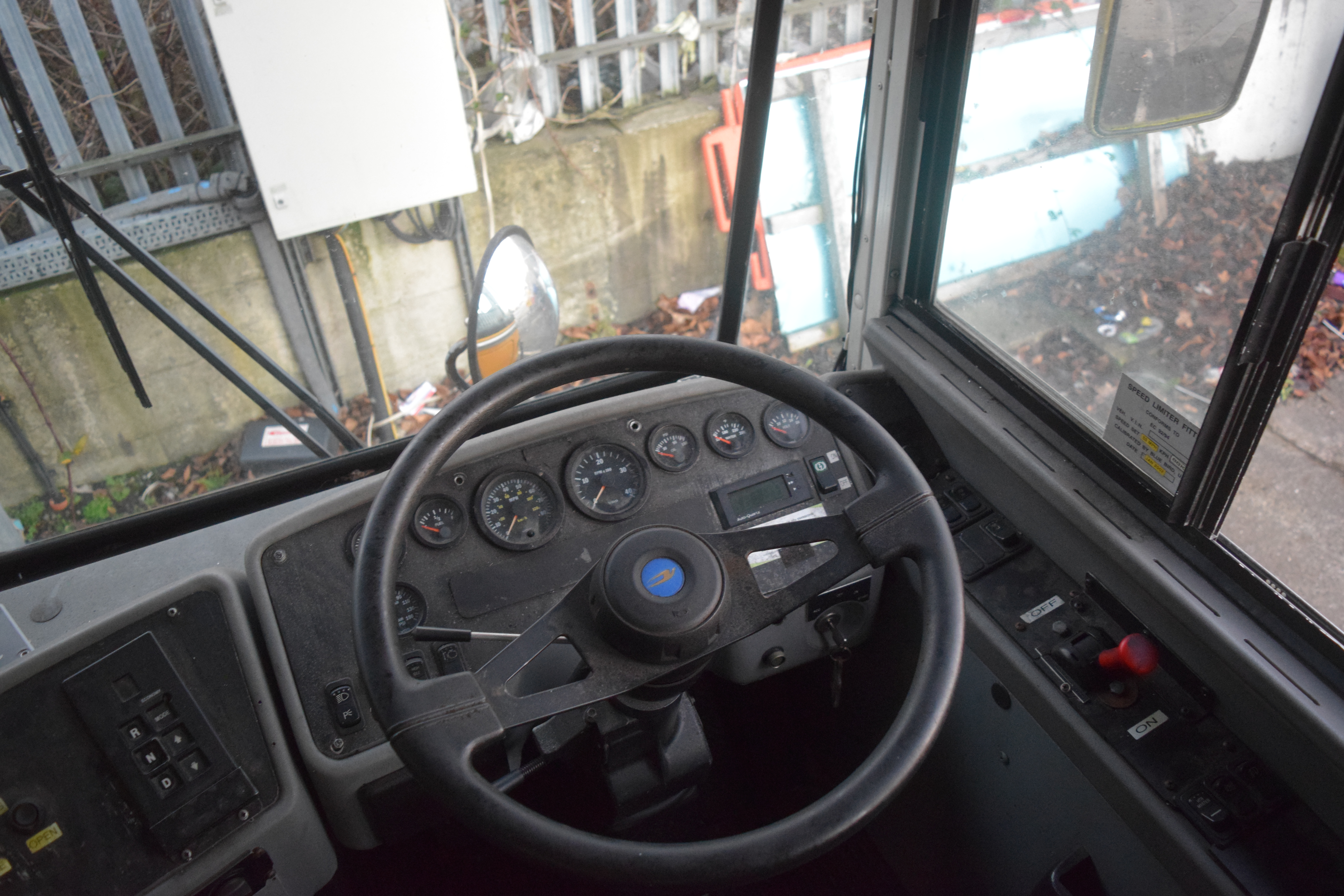
Drivers compartment of All American (right-hand drive version)

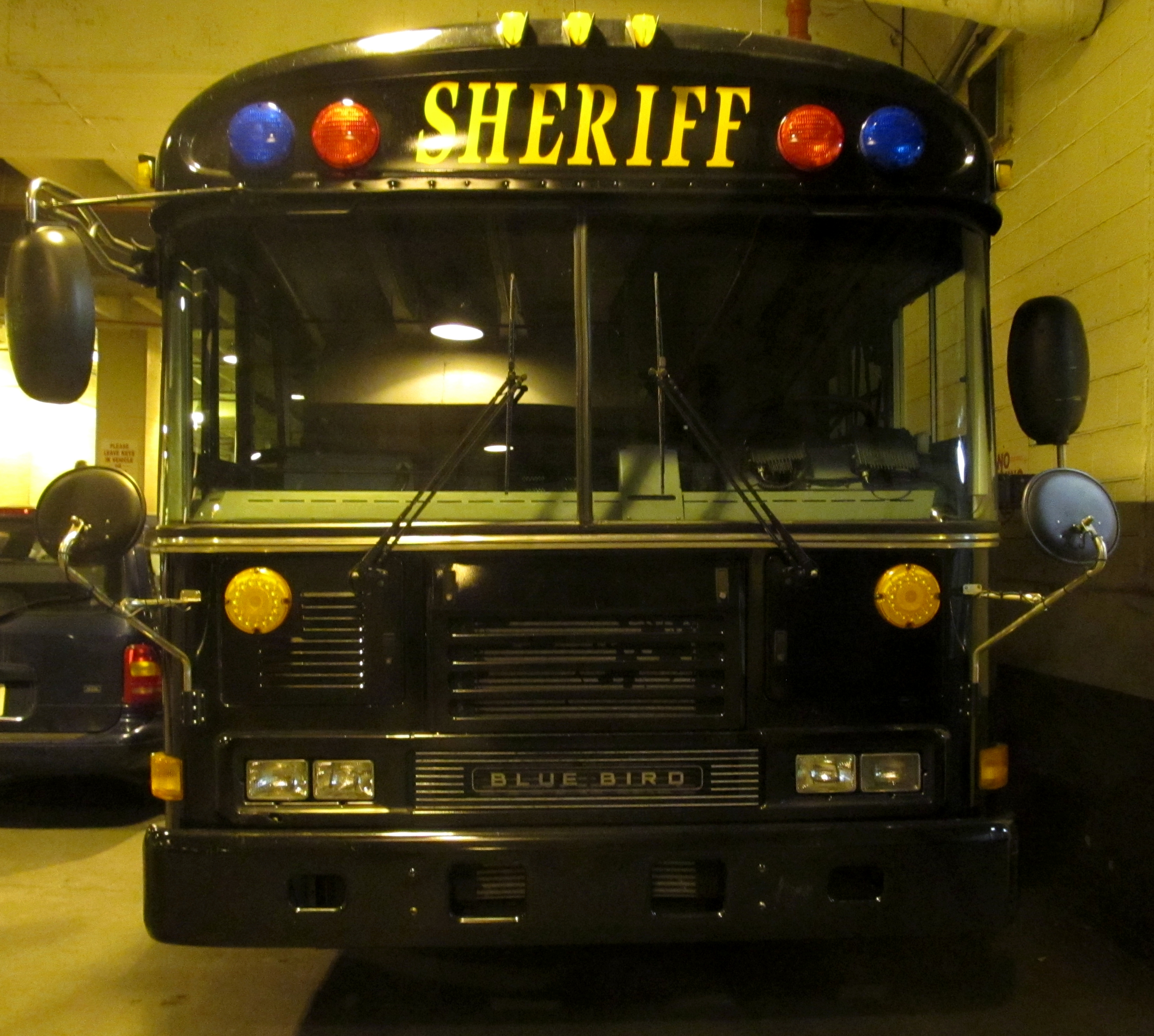
Blue Bird All American FE Cuyahoga County Sheriff's Office Prisoner Transport Bus.

Following the introduction of the A3 series, the Blue Bird transit-style product range would undergo an extensive transition. Following its 1999 introduction, Blue Bird discontinued the rear-engine TC/2000, consolidating its rear-engine offerings in the All American product line. In 2001, the company ended production of the TC/1000 front-engine minibus and discontinued the CS and APC commercial derivatives of both the TC/2000 and All American in 2002. To consolidate its front-engine offerings, Blue Bird discontinued the TC/2000 after 2003 (following a short run of 2004 vehicles). After 2010, Blue Bird manufactured only the Vision and the All American (with the Micro Bird manufactured by Girardin in Quebec).

At its launch, the A3 series carried over the same diesel engine offerings as the previous generation. It was the first generation of the All American to have ever offered a CNG engine option, especially as the TC/2000 discontinued in 2003.

The fourth-generation All American continued the use of Cummins and Caterpillar inline-6 diesel engines; initially, the John Deere 8.1L engine was offered for CNG use, later replaced by a 5.9L Cummins and ISL-G Cummins engines.

Blue Bird All American A3FE/A3RE powertrain specifications
| Engine name | Fuel | Transmission |
|---|---|---|
| Caterpillar 3126/C7 | Diesel | Allison AT545 Allison MT643 Allison MD3060 Allison MD3066 Allison PTS2500 Allison PTS3000 |
| Cummins ISC 8.3 | Diesel | Allison AT545 Allison MT643 Allison MD3060 Allison MD3066 Allison PTS2500 Allison PTS3000 |
| Cummins ISB 5.9 (1999-2007) | Diesel | Allison AT545 Allison MT643 Allison MD3060 Allison MD3066 Allison PTS2500 Allison PTS3000 |
| Cummins ISB 6.7 (2007-2013) | Diesel | Allison AT545 Allison MT643 Allison MD3060 Allison MD3066 Allison PTS2500 Allison PTS3000 |
| John Deere 8.1L I6 (1999-2009) | CNG | Allison AT545 Allison MT643 Allison MD3060 Allison MD3066 Allison PTS2500 Allison PTS3000 |
| Cummins B5.9G | CNG | Allison AT545 Allison MT643 Allison MD3060 Allison MD3066 Allison PTS2500 Allison PTS3000 |
| Cummins ISL-G (2010-2013) | CNG | Allison AT545 Allison MT643 Allison MD3060 Allison MD3066 Allison PTS2500 Allison PTS3000 |

As Blue Bird initially intended to replace the model line entirely with the fifth-generation D3 series, the rear-engine A3 was discontinued in 2013. Supported by continued customer demand, the front-engine A3 was also produced through 2013 (outliving its successor by a year, it was sold as model year 2014), when the sixth-generation T3 series replaced both the fourth-generation and fifth-generation All Americans.

Alongside its traditional role of a yellow school bus, the A3 series was produced for other applications; the model line was offered for sale for U.S. General Services Administration motor pool fleets, along for export worldwide.

== Fifth generation (2010-2013) ==
Fifth generation (D3)
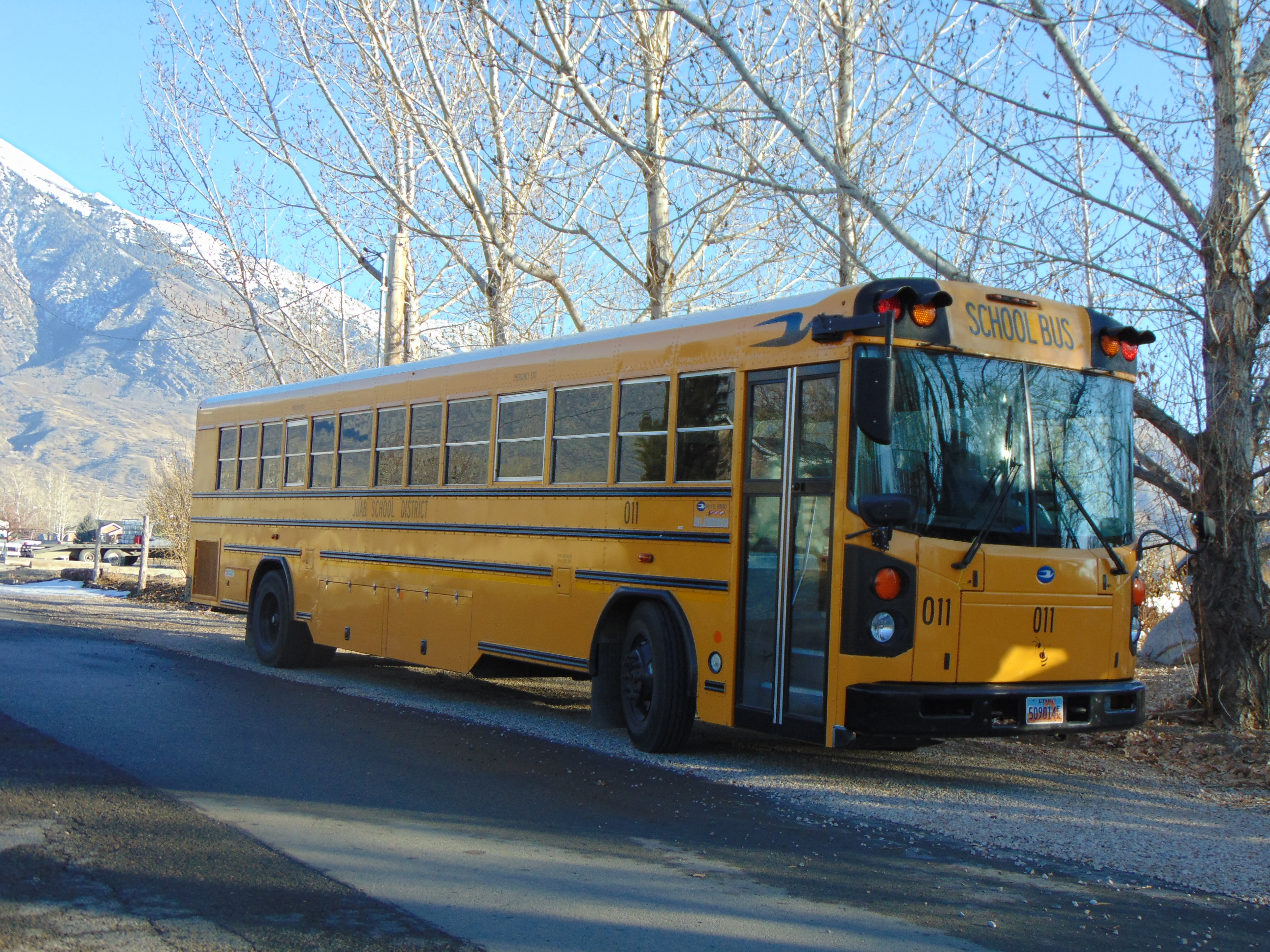
- 2010–2014 Blue Bird All American RE (D3RE)

Overview
- Also called: Blue Bird TX3 (Canada)
- Production: 2008–2012
- Model years: 2010–2013
- Assembly: Fort Valley, Georgia

Body and chassis
- Body style: Monocoque stressed skin: School bus; Commercial bus
- Layout: Front-engine 4x2 Rear-engine 4x2

Powertrain
- Engine: Diesel; Compressed natural gas
- Transmission: Automatic

Chronology
- Predecessor: Blue Bird All American (A3)
- Successor: Blue Bird All American (T3)

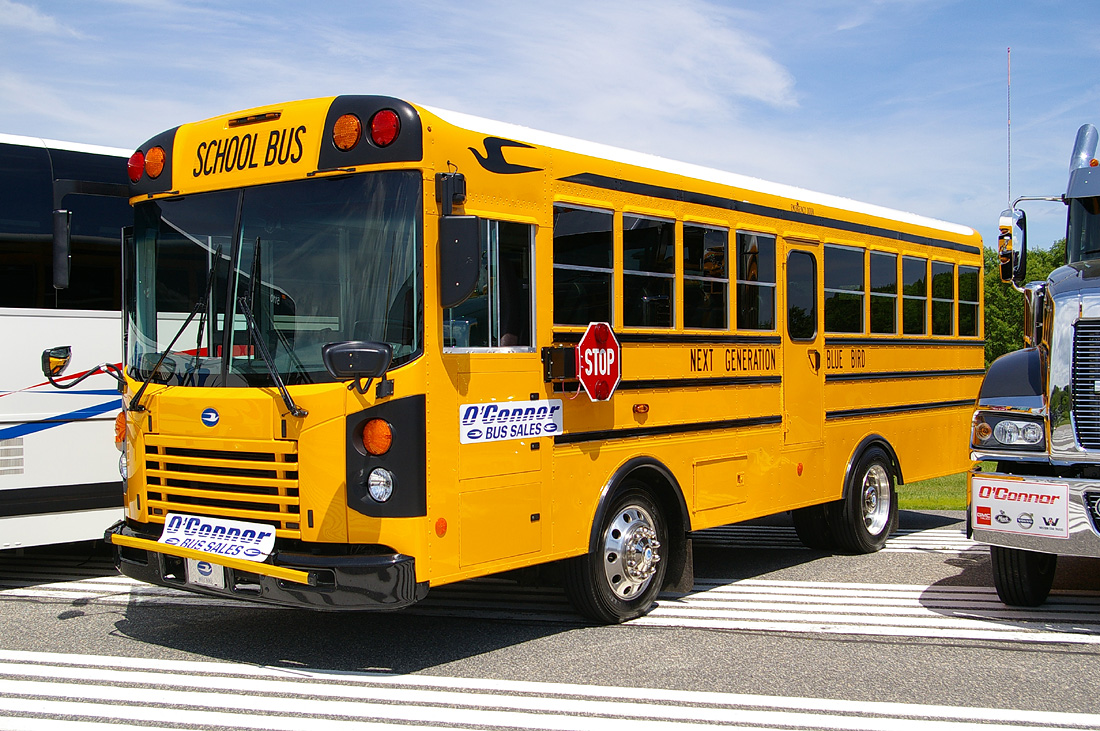
2010 Blue Bird TX3 (Canada)

Introduced for 2010 production, the fifth-generation All American (internally designated the "D3" series) was unveiled at an industry trade show in Myrtle Beach, South Carolina on October 28, 2008. The D3 series marked the most extensive changes to the body design of the All American (and all Blue Bird buses) in over 50 years. For the first time since 1957, the All American returned to two headlamps (round ones, for the first time since early 1989). Completely devoid of chrome trim, the design deleted "Blue Bird" lettering from the front of the bus (replacing it with a company logo).

Continuing the use of a drop-frame chassis from the previous generation, the body received a completely new roofline and drivers' compartment design. The shape of the roofline was squared off and raised in height (matching the previous high-headroom roof); as a part of the redesign, the entry door was raised in height. The long-running flat-glass windshield was replaced by a two-piece curved design (extending further downward and upward); to improve sightlines, the sideview and convex mirrors were integrated into a single housing. At the rear of the bus, the emergency door was redesigned, enlarged in height and width (for the first time since the second generation). The drivers' compartment received a new steering column and instrument panel (both later used by the Vision), along with a new layout for driver controls (on both sides of the steering wheel).

The D3 series continued the use of diesel and CNG engines (the latter, on rear-engine vehicles). Coinciding with the exit of Caterpillar from on-highway engine production, all engines were sourced from Cummins. Front-engine buses were powered by the Cummins ISB 6.7, with rear-engine buses using the ISC 8.3.

In production for only four years, the D3 series is the shortest-produced version of the All American. Intended as the successor to the A3, Blue Bird continued to produce the A3 version of the model line alongside its predecessor to accommodate customer demand. Both versions of the D3 were discontinued after 2012, with both versions of the A3 ending production in 2013.

Introduced for 2014 production, the sixth-generation T3 series replaced both the fourth and fifth generation versions of the model line.

Blue Bird All American D3 specifications
| Model name | All American FE | All American RE |
|---|---|---|
| Seating capacity | 54–90 | 66–84 |
| Overall length (inches) | 354–487 inches (9.0–12.4 m) | 405–489 inches (10.3–12.4 m) |
| Body width (exterior) | 96 inches (2.4 m) | |
| Body height (depending on configuration) | 123–124 inches (3.1–3.1 m) | 126 inches (3.2 m) |
| Wheelbase | 141–232 inches (3.6–5.9 m) | 189–273 inches (4.8–6.9 m) |
| Interior headroom | 78 inches (2.0 m) | |
| GVWR | Up to 36,200 pounds (16,400 kg) | |
| Fuel type(s) | Diesel | Diesel; Compressed Natural Gas (CNG) |
| Engine | Cummins ISB 6.7 (200–280 hp or 150–210 kW) | Cummins ISC 8.3 (260–300 hp or 190–220 kW); Cummins ISL-G CNG (250–280 hp or 190–210 kW) |
| Transmission | Allison PTS 2500 (standard); Allison PTS 3000 (optional) | Allison PTS 3000 (standard) |
| Brakes | Standard: Hydraulic brakes; 4-wheel anti-lock; Optional: Air brakes | Standard: Air brakes; 4-wheel anti-lock |

== Sixth generation (2014–present) ==
Sixth generation (T3)
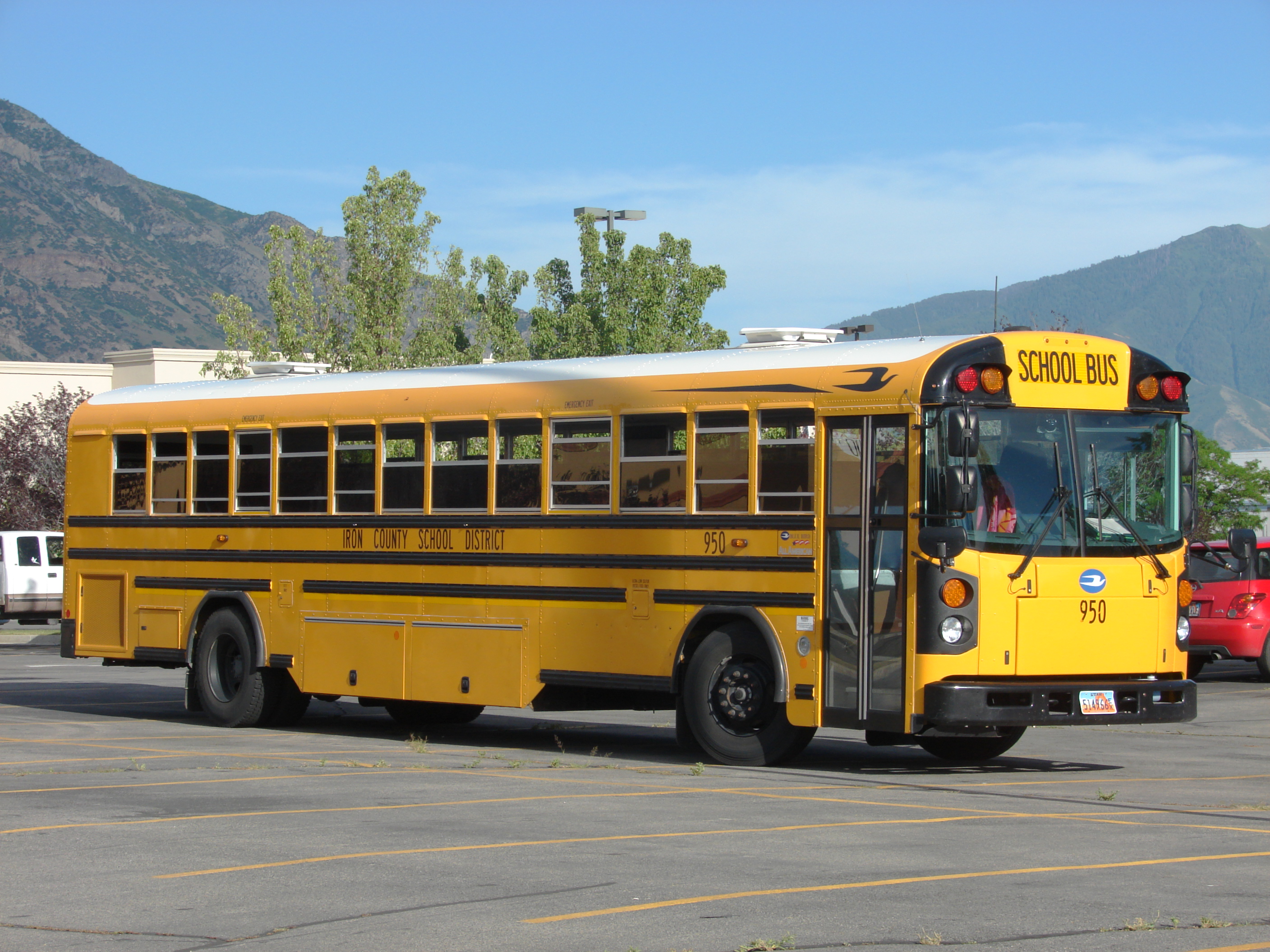
- 2014-2015 Blue Bird All American RE

Overview
- Also called: Blue Bird TX4 (Canada)
- Production: 2012–present
- Model years: 2014–present
- Assembly: Fort Valley, Georgia

Body and chassis
- Body style: Monocoque stressed skin: School bus; Commercial bus

Powertrain
- Engine: Diesel; Compressed Natural Gas (discontinued in 2024); Electric
- Transmission: Automatic

Chronology
- Predecessor: Blue Bird All American (D3); Blue Bird All American (A3)

In October 2012, Blue Bird debuted the sixth generation of the All American for 2014 production (internally designated the T3 series). Replacing both the fourth and fifth generations (produced concurrently), the sixth generation introduced additional structural upgrades to the body. In a central part of the redesign, Blue Bird increased parts commonality between the All American and the Vision conventional-style bus, with the two sharing additional dashboard controls and components.

While visibly sharing lower body panels with the A3 series and the Vision, the T3 introduced a number of structural reinforcements to the body, intended for increased rollover protection; the redesign reintroduced the curved roof configuration. While the grille was redesigned (becoming a slotted panel), the front fascia was largely retained from the D3 series, sharing its two-piece windshield and round headlamps. In a visual change, Blue Bird ended the use of the full-length roofline "streamer" (roof stripe), replacing it with a design shared directly with Micro Bird buses (further increasing production commonality).

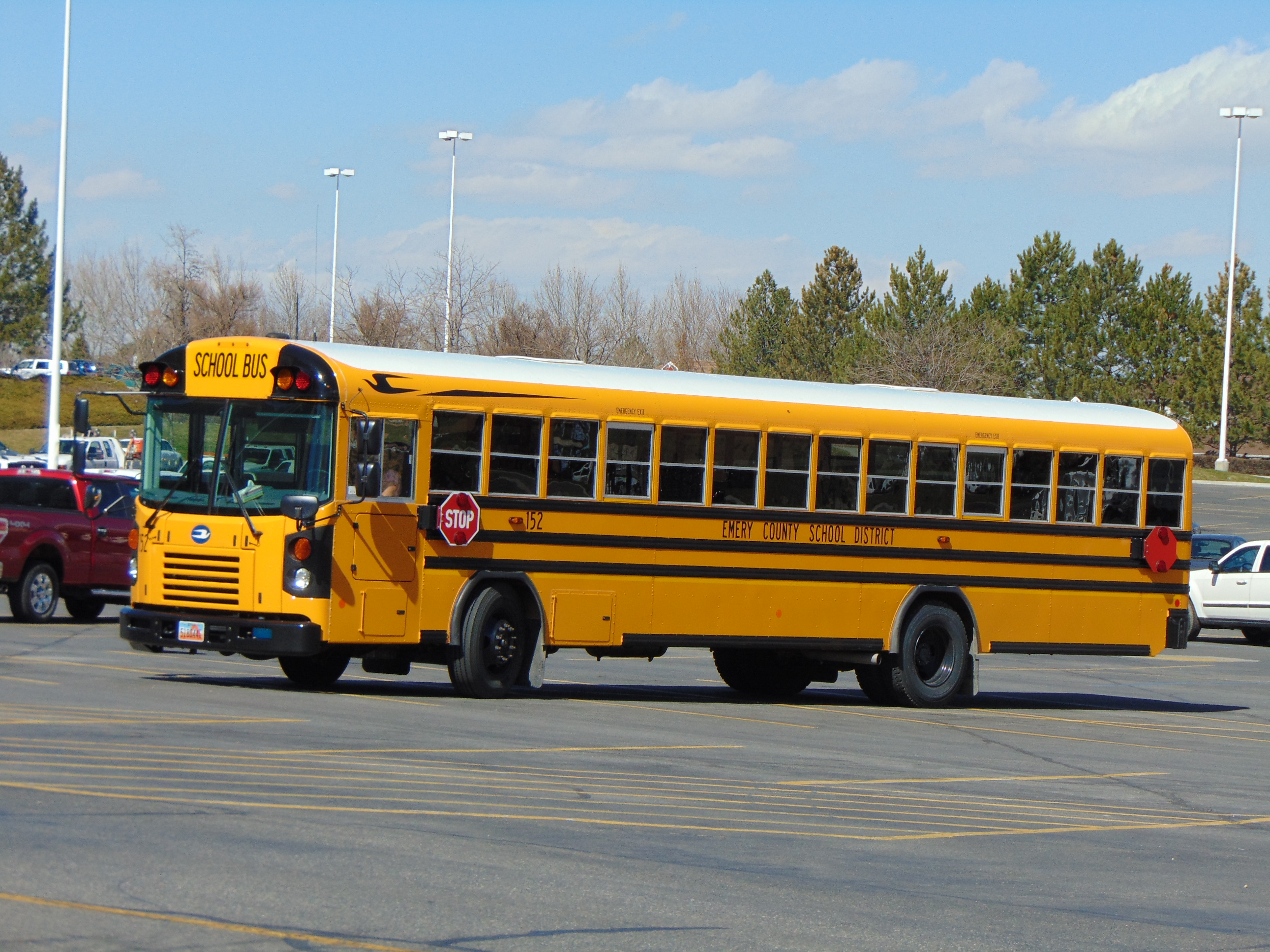
90-passenger All American FE (T3)

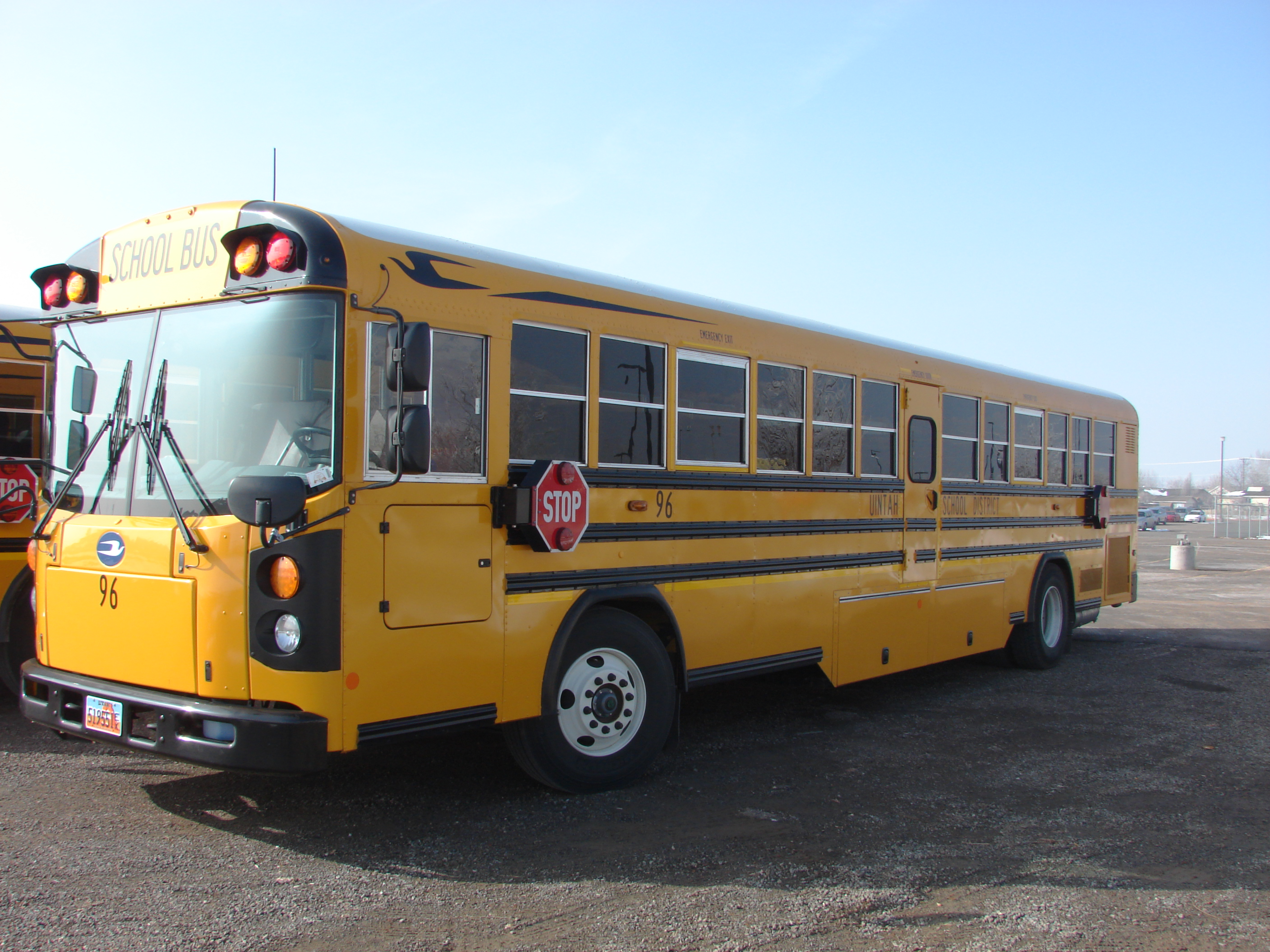
84-passenger All American RE (T3)

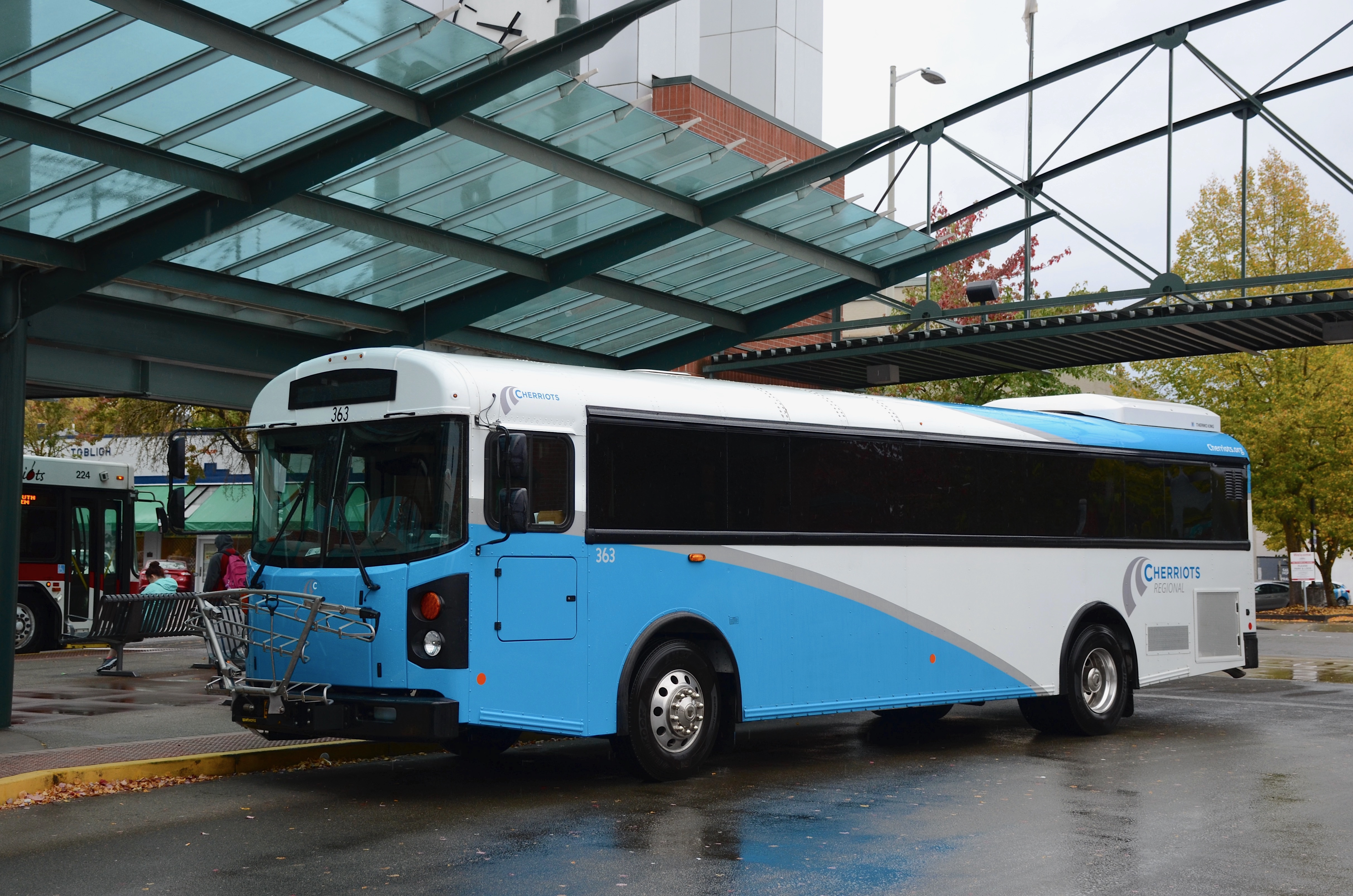
A 2018 All American RE configured for transit use, in Salem, Oregon

Since its introduction, the sixth-generation All American has been offered with both diesel and CNG engines. A 6.7L Cummins inline-6 diesel is the standard engine for both front-engine and rear-engine versions; both diesel and CNG versions of the Cummins ISL (Cummins L9 since 2018) are options for the rear-engine T3.

In 2019, Blue Bird introduced a battery-electric version of the rear-engine All American.

In 2024, Blue Bird discontinued the Compressed Natural Gas (CNG) options from the All American family, as demand significantly shifted towards primarily electric, as well as cleaner diesel vehicles.

In 2025, the front-engine All American entered its 75th year of continuous production; 2026 production marks 65 years since the introduction of its rear-engine variant.

Blue Bird All American T3 Specifications
| Model name | All American FE | All American RE |
|---|---|---|
| Seating capacity | 54–90 | 66–84 |
| Overall length (inches) | 354–487 inches (9.0–12.4 m) | 405–489 inches (10.3–12.4 m) |
| Body width (exterior) | 96 inches (2.4 m) | |
| Body height (depending on configuration) | 122–128 inches (3.1–3.3 m) | |
| Wheelbase (depending on capacity) | 141–232 inches (3.6–5.9 m) | 189–273 inches (4.8–6.9 m) |
| Interior headroom | 77 inches (2.0 m) | |
| GVWR | Up to 36,200 pounds (16,400 kg) | |
| Fuel type(s) | Diesel | Diesel Compressed natural gas (CNG) (2014-2024) Electric (BEV) |
| Engine | 2014-2017: Cummins ISB 6.7 200–280 hp (150–210 kW); 2018-2027: Cummins B6.7 200–280 hp (150–210 kW); 2028-present: Cummins B7.2 240–340 hp (180–250 kW) | Diesel: 2014-2017: Cummins ISB 6.7 200–300 hp (150–220 kW); 2018-2027: Cummins B6.7 200–300 hp (150–220 kW); 2028-present: Cummins B7.2 240–340 hp (180–250 kW); 2014-2017: Cummins ISL 8.9 200–300 hp (150–220 kW); 2018-present: Cummins L9 260–300 hp (190–220 kW); Compressed Natural Gas (CNG); Cummins ISL-G CNG 250–280 hp (190–210 kW) 2018-2024: Cummins L9N 250–280 hp (190–210 kW); Electric; 100-150 kWh capacity (80-100 mile range) |
| Transmission | Allison PTS 2500 5-speed automatic | Allison PTS 2500 5-speed automatic (only on B6.7); Allison PTS 3000 5/6-speed automatic (Standard); Eaton Fuller 5 Speed Automatic (Discontinued) |
| Brakes | Standard: Hydraulic 4-wheel disc; Optional: Air drum; Air disc | Air drum; Air disc |

== Variants ==
=== Export ===
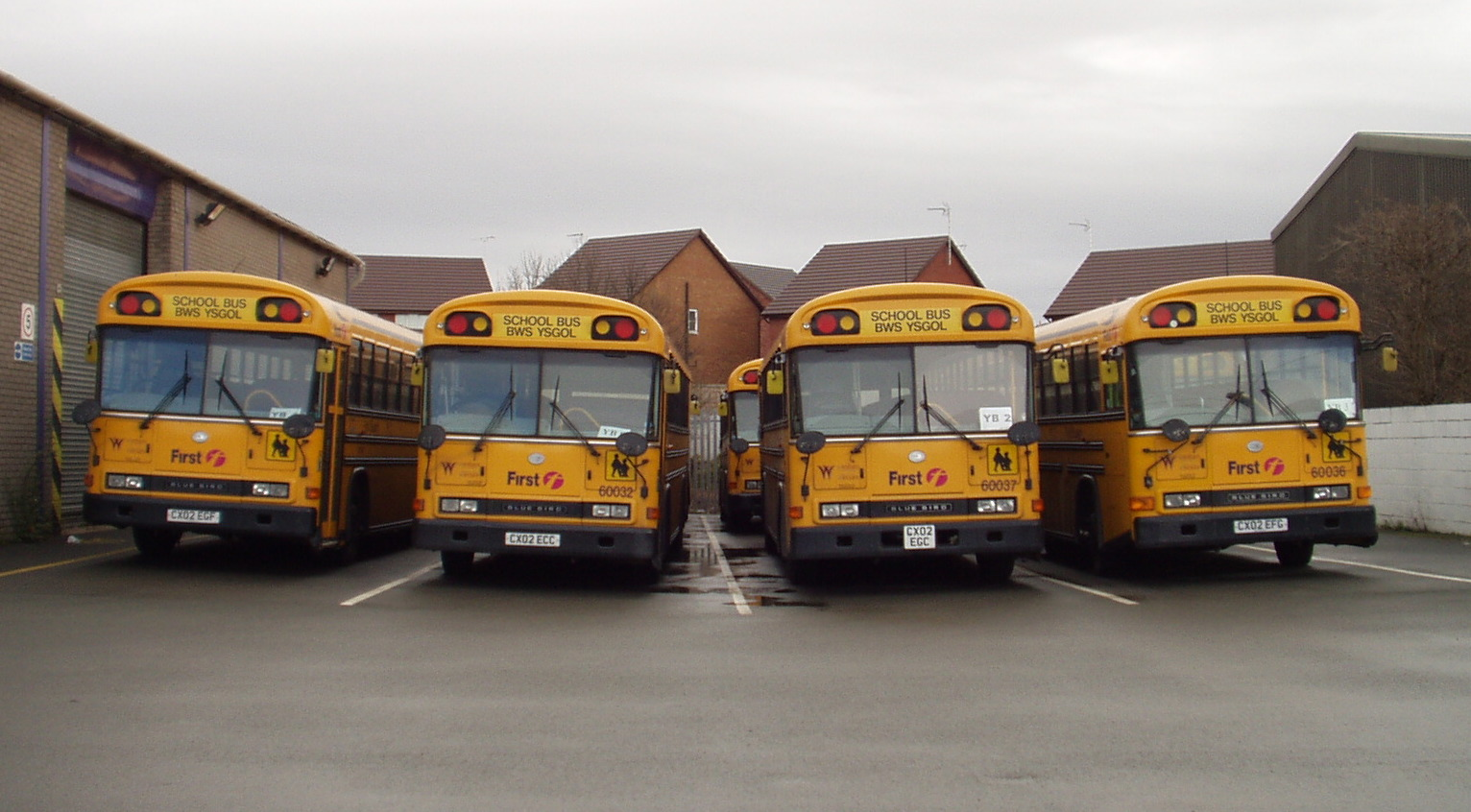
Right-hand drive Blue Bird TC/3000 REs in Wales

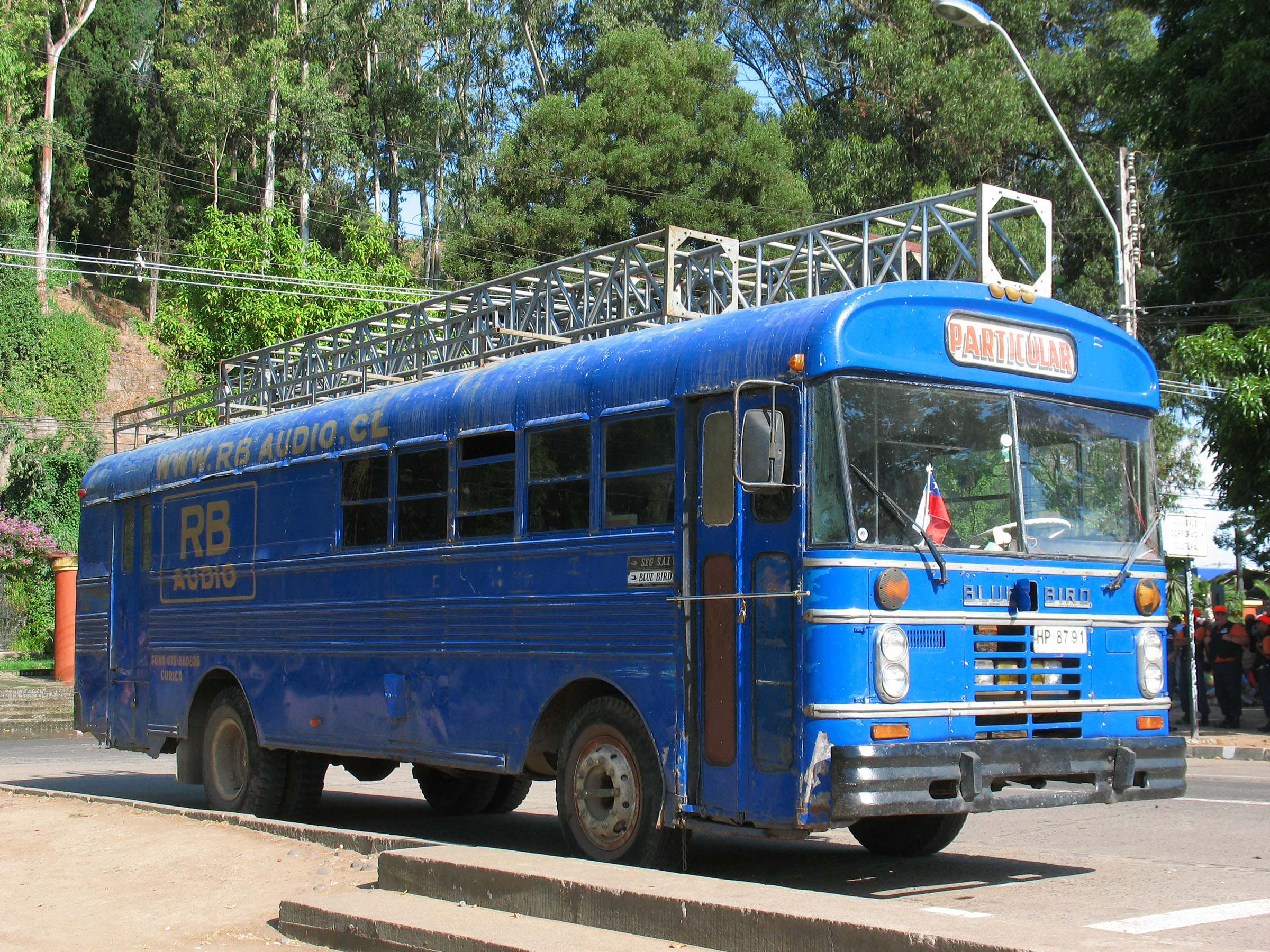
1980 Blue Bird All American FE (South America) in Chile (unknown chassis)

Following the 1966 establishment of its manufacturing facility located in Guatemala (Blue Bird Central America), the factory produced buses using the All American body. In a shift from its American-produced counterpart, Blue Bird Central America used locally sourced truck chassis (Ford, Mercedes-Benz, and Hino), instead of the proprietary Blue Bird chassis. Alongside school buses, many examples were built for mass transit. Blue Bird Central America was closed by the company in the early 1980s.

Central American countries like El Salvador and Honduras, have been known to use Bluebird, Thomas, and IC School Buses and convert them to Transit Buses, usually the older ones.

=== Commercial use (APC/CS) ===
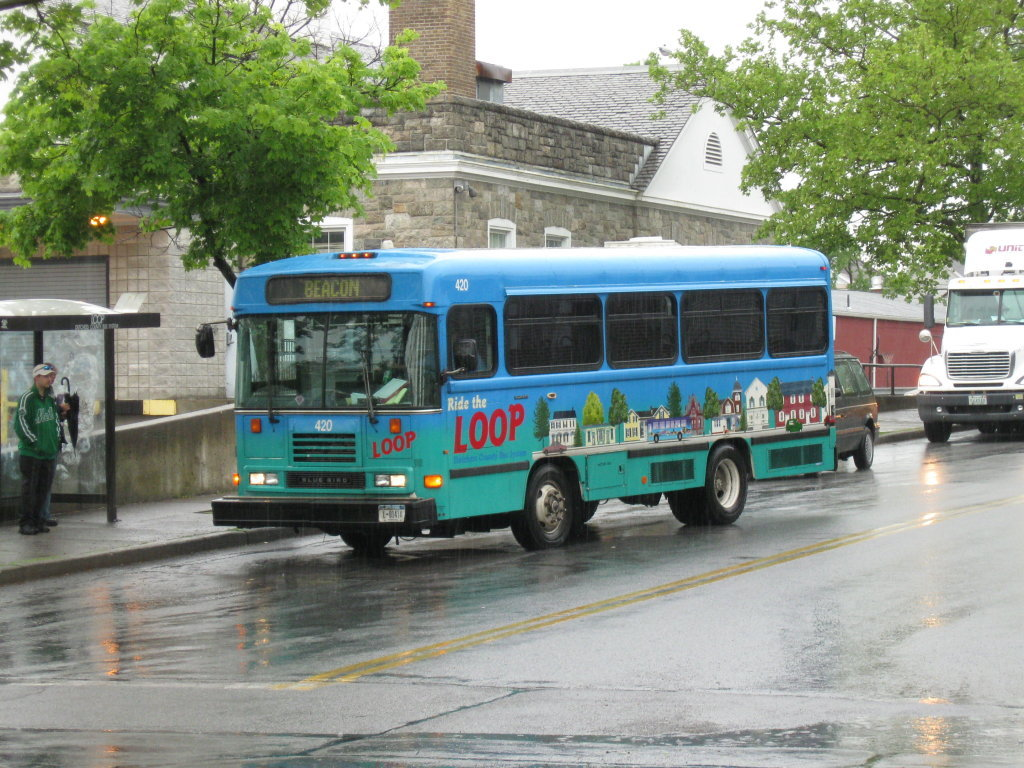
Blue Bird CSFE3000

Alongside buses produced for multiple applications, Blue Bird produced two distinct model commercial-use model ranges of the All American during the 1990s. The Blue Bird APC (All Purpose Coach) was directly derived from the body of the school bus, typically fitted with transit bus seating. The heaviest-duty model (the APC 3000) was derived from the All American.

Again sharing its chassis underpinnings with the TC/2000 and All American, the Blue Bird CS (Commercial Series) is a commercial transit bus that was produced during the 1990s; the heaviest-duty CS 3000 was derived from the All American. The CS was fitted with its own roofline, including transit passenger windows, a wheelchair lift, and a destination sign.

After 2002, the APC and CS were withdrawn, with all commercial-use buses (such as law-enforcement vehicles) directly derived from the All American A3-series. Subsequently, Blue Bird did not design transit bus variants of the D3 and T3 generations.

=== Recreational vehicle (Wanderlodge) ===
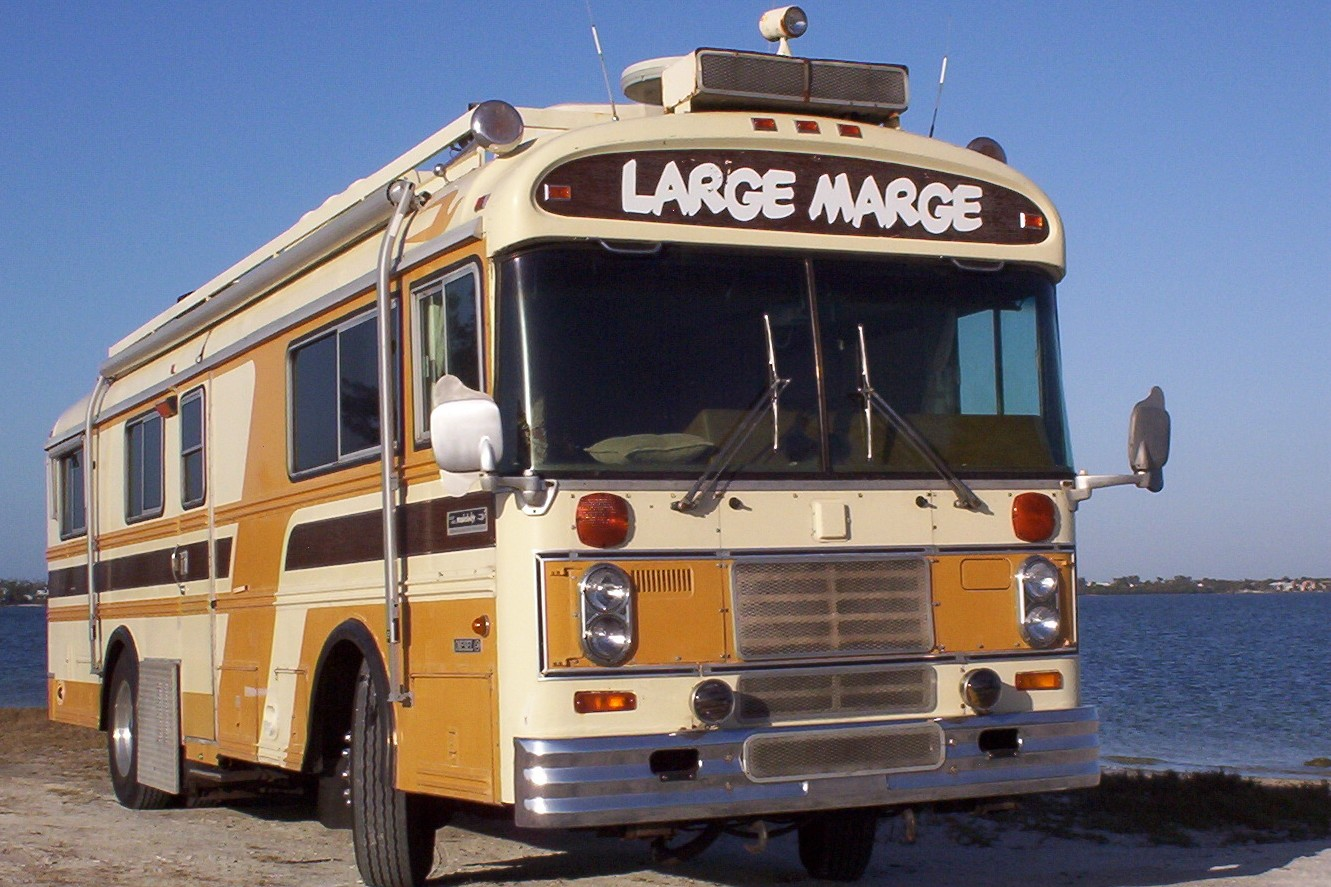
1980 Blue Bird Wanderlodge

From 1963 to 1989, the Blue Bird Wanderlodge luxury motorhome derived its body and chassis from the second-generation All American. Initially developed as a 31-foot vehicle, the Wanderlodge was offered in 33, 35, or 40-foot lengths, dependent on chassis and interior configuration. In contrast to other RV manufacturers, Blue Bird assembled a nearly bespoke vehicle, with each owner selecting from over 200 standard options (with additional availability for further customization).

In the early 1980s, the design of the two model lines began to diverge. In 1982, a rear-engine Wanderlodge was introduced with a rear tag axle and a double-rail frame; its 6V92 Detroit Diesel was not offered on the All American. In the late 1980s, Blue Bird began to conceal the school bus origins of the body, adding square headlamps, a (much) larger grille, and different roof caps.

During 1989, Blue Bird began to introduce a second generation of the Wanderlodge, moving to a 102-inch body width (not then legal for school buses), retiring its vehicles derived from the All American for 1990 production.

Following two further generations of the Wanderlodge, Blue Bird sold the rights to the model line in 2007, with production ending entirely in 2009.

== See also ==
- Blue Bird Wanderlodge - luxury motorhome derived from the second-generation All American
- Blue Bird TC/2000 - 1988-2004 Blue Bird Type D product line.
- List of buses
