= All American =

All American or The All American may refer to:

== Gaming and sporting ==
- All-America, annual honor for top American amateur athletes
- All American (video poker), a video poker game
- All American Football League, a proposed American football league
- All American Futurity, a horse race held in New Mexico
- All American Racers, an American racing team founded in 1964

== Aircraft ==
- All American (aircraft), a World War II B-17 bomber aircraft
- All American Aircraft, an aircraft manufacturer formed in 1945

== Film and TV ==
- All American (film), a 1953 film starring Tony Curtis
- All American (TV series), a 2018 American television series that airs on The CW
- The All American (film), a 1932 American sports drama starring Richard Arlen
- "All-Americans" (Quantum Leap), a 1990 television episode

== Music ==
- All American (EP), a 2012 EP by Hoodie Allen
- All American (musical), a 1962 Broadway show
- All American (album), a 2015 album by Nick Carter
- "All American", a song by Todrick Hall from Forbidden
- The All American (album), a 2000 album by Chainsaw Kittens

== Other uses ==
- All-American Canal, a canal in southeastern California
- All-American Division, 82nd Airborne Division of the US Army
- All-American Publications, a comic book company founded in 1938
- All-American Road, the designation of the most scenic National Scenic Byways
- Blue Bird All American, an American school bus that began production in 1948
- All-American, a term used by some dog registries and clubs to refer to mixed-breed dogs
- All-American Burger, defunct fast food chain in California
