= American Association =

American Association may refer to:

- American Association (1882–1891), a baseball major league active from 1882 to 1891
- American Association (1902–1997), a baseball minor league active from 1902 to 1962 and 1969 to 1997
- American Association of Professional Baseball, an independent baseball league founded in 2006
- American Association (American football), a professional American football minor league that existed from 1936 to 1950

== See also ==
- American Association Building, a historic building in Middlesboro, Kentucky, U.S.
- National Association (disambiguation)
