= National Association =

National Association may refer to:

== Politics ==
- National Association (South Korea), a political party 1946–1960
- Kokumin Kyōkai ('National Association'), a Japanese political party 1892–1899

== United States baseball ==
- National Association of Base Ball Players (1857–1870), the first organization governing American baseball
- National Association of Professional Base Ball Players (1871–1875)
- National Association (1879–1880)
- National Association of Professional Baseball Leagues, the former legal name of Minor League Baseball
- National Association of Professional Baseball, future name of Frontier League starting in 2027

== Other uses ==
- National Association, or "N.A.", the official designation of federally chartered banks in the United States

== See also ==
- American Association (disambiguation)
