= Armorica (disambiguation) =

Armorica is an ancient region of Gaul.

Armorica may also refer to:

- Armorican terrane, or Armorica, a former microcontinent
- Armorica Regional Nature Park, in France
- Armorica (game), a card game

== See also ==
- Armorican (disambiguation)
