= American River (disambiguation) =

American River is a whitewater river of California.

American River may also refer to:

== Rivers ==
- American River (Agiapuk River tributary), in Alaska
- American River (Washington), a tributary of the Bumping River in Washington

== Populated places ==
- American River, South Australia, a town on Kangaroo Island in South Australia

== Other ==
- American Rivers, a United States environmental advocacy group
- American River College
- American River Parkway
- American River Transportation Company
