= American (1914 automobile) =

Defunct American motor vehicle

The American was a cyclecar made by American Cyclecar Co. of Detroit, Michigan in 1914. It had a 4-cylinder engine of 1.2 liters, and featured a friction transmission and chain drive. The headlights were inserted into the fenders, a feature later associated with the Pierce-Arrow. The make was superseded by the Trumbull.
