= American Falls (disambiguation) =

American Falls is the American channel of Niagara Falls.

American Falls may also refer to:

- American Falls, Idaho, a city in the US
  - American Falls Dam, a dam and reservoir on the Snake River
  - American Falls High School, Idaho
- American Falls, a Civil War-era novel by John Calvin Batchelor
