= American Association Building =

- American Association, Limited, Office Building
- U.S. National Register of Historic Places
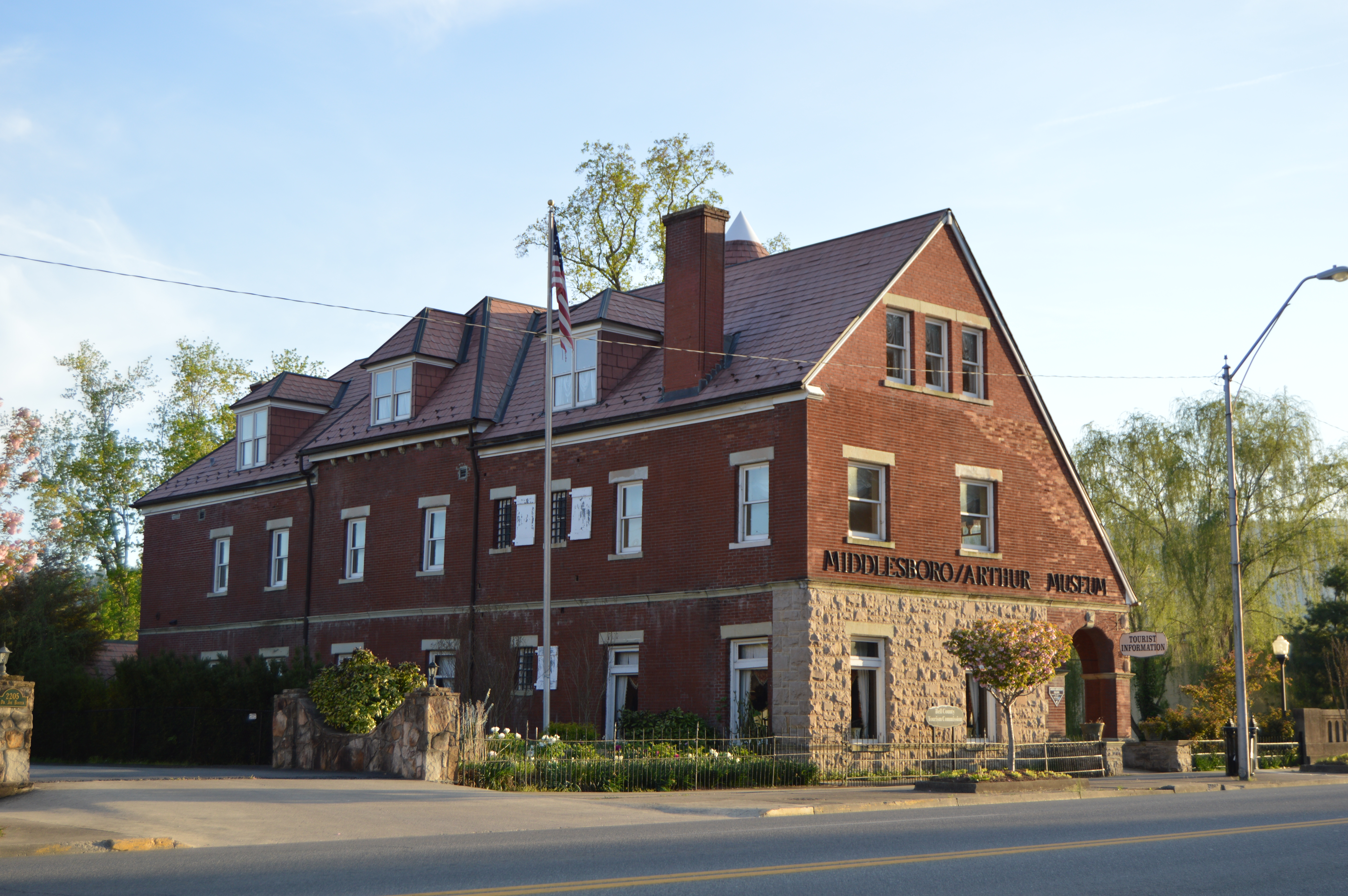
- Location: 2215 Cumberland Ave., Middlesboro, Kentucky
- Coordinates: 36°36′24″N 83°43′05″W
- Area: 0.4 acres (0.16 ha)
- Built: c.1890
- Architect: Col. George H. Waring
- Architectural style: Richardsonian Romanesque
- NRHP reference No.: 78001299
- Added to NRHP: December 29, 1978

The American Association, Limited, Office Building, at 2215 Cumberland Ave. in Middlesboro, Kentucky, United States, was built in c.1890. It was listed on the National Register of Historic Places in 1978.

It is a two-and-a-half-story building, somewhat Richardsonian Romanesque in style.

It was deemed "important historically because of its ties with establishment of the town. Its founder, Alexander Arthur, a Canadian, obtained British backing to form the American Association, Limited, that was to finance mining operations in southeast Kentucky and northeast Tennessee and the construction of Middlesboro, which was to serve as headquarters for these activities. The 2-1/2-story, brick structure was built as offices for the American Association, Limited."
