= Armorican =

Armorican may refer to:

- Armorica, an ancient region of northwestern France
- Armorican (cattle), a French breed of cattle
- Armorican dialect, an extinct dialect of the Gaulish language

== See also ==
- Armorican Massif
- Armorican terrane
- Armorican orogeny, a mountain-building period during the Variscan orogeny
- Armoricani, an Iron Age tribe in Brittany
- Armorica (disambiguation)
