= American (1899 automobile) =

Defunct American motor vehicle manufacturer

The American was an American Bantam automobile designed by Frank Duryea and manufactured by the American Automobile Company of New York City from 1899 to 1901. It was a "hydro-carbon carriage" which could be started from the seat by its chain-and-sprocket gearing.
