= Ford Super Duty engine =

Ford Super Duty V8

Overview
- Manufacturer: Ford Motor Company
- Production: 1958–1981

Layout
- Configuration: 90° V8
- Displacement: 401 cu in (6.6 L); 477 cu in (7.8 L); 534 cu in (8.8 L)
- Cylinder bore: 4 1/8 in (104.8 mm); 4 1/2 in (114.3 mm)
- Piston stroke: 3 3/4 in (95.3 mm); 4.2 in (106.7 mm)
- Cylinder block material: Cast iron
- Cylinder head material: Cast iron
- Valvetrain: OHV, 2 valves per cylinder
- Compression ratio: 7.5:1

Combustion
- Turbocharger: Twin-turbo on 534 cu in (8.8 L) marine version
- Fuel type: Gasoline
- Cooling system: Water-cooled

Output
- Power output: 226–266 hp (169–198 kW)
- Torque output: 350–490 lb⋅ft (475–664 N⋅m)

Dimensions
- Dry weight: 1,300 lb (590 kg) (534ci twin-turbo marine version)

Chronology
- Predecessor: Lincoln Y-block
- Successor: Ford 385 V8

The Ford Super Duty engine is a range of V8 engines that were manufactured by Ford Motor Company. Introduced in 1958, the Super Duty engines replaced the Lincoln Y-block V8 (alongside the smaller Ford MEL V8 engines).

By the end of the 1970s, the use of the Super Duty engine began to decline in heavy trucks in favor of diesel-fueled engines; in medium-duty trucks, variants of the similar-displacement (but higher-efficiency) 385-series V8s became more commonly used. In 1981, Ford withdrew the Super Duty engine line.

Through its production, the Super Duty engines were assembled by Ford in its Cleveland Engine Plant #2 in Brook Park, Ohio.

== Design ==
The Super Duty engine is 90-degree overhead-valve V8 with angled piston decks. The cylinder heads are flat and the pistons are crowned to create a wedge-shaped combustion chamber within the cylinder bore; the compression ratio is 7.5:1 for all models. They are typically governed to 3400 rpm.

Three displacements were available during production: 401 cu in (6.6 L), 477 cu in (7.8 L) and 534 cu in (8.8 L).

The 401 has a cylinder bore and a stroke of 4 1/8 in × 3 3/4 in (104.8 mm × 95.3 mm). The 477 shares the 401's stroke with a larger 4 1/2 in (114.3 mm) bore; the 534 has this same bore with a stroke of 4.2 in (106.7 mm).

The early Super Duty has a unique intake system where the intake plenum is connected directly to the cylinder head; all four cylinders pull the air/fuel mixture from a single "log" type port in the head. The engines could "spit" when cold and blow the choke plate out into the air cleaner because of the large port configuration. In later engines this was corrected with a conventional spider-type intake. The exhaust valves are filled with sodium to carry heat from the valve head to the valve stem, which would dissipate it into the valve guide and thus to the coolant in the cylinder head.

A marine version of the 534, the "Seamaster", was available from the Seamaster Marine Engine Co. starting in the late 1950s. It was available either naturally aspirated or with twin-turbochargers with an intercooler, and had a dry weight of over 1,300 lb (590 kg).

Performance specifications
Name	Configuration	Bore x stroke	Power output	Torque output
SD-401	401 cu in (6.6 L)	4 1/8 in × 3 3/4 in (104.8 mm × 95.3 mm)	226 hp (169 kW) @ 3600 rpm	350 lb⋅ft (475 N⋅m) @ 2500-3600 rpm
SD-477	477 cu in (7.8 L)	4 1/2 in × 3 3/4 in (114.3 mm × 95.3 mm)	253 hp (189 kW) @ 3400 rpm	430 lb⋅ft (583 N⋅m) @ 2500-3000 rpm
SD-534	534 cu in (8.8 L)	4 1/2 in × 4.2 in (114.3 mm × 106.7 mm)	266 hp (198 kW) @ 3200 rpm	490 lb⋅ft (664 N⋅m) @ 1800-2300 rpm

== Applications ==
Among the heaviest and highest-displacement V8 engines ever built by Ford, the Super Duty engines were never used in automobiles; its debut in medium and heavy trucks marked the renaming of Ford F-Series "Big Job" conventionals after the engine. Slotted above the 330, 361, and 391 FT V8s used in the medium-duty F-Series (F-500 to F-700 and B-series), the Super Duty was used in heavy-duty trucks, including the F-800, F-900 "Super Duty" conventionals.

Outside of the F-Series, the Super Duty engine was used in several model ranges of Ford heavy trucks, including:

- Ford C-Series low-cab COE
- Ford N-Series short-hood Class 8 conventional (replacement for F-Series conventional)
- Ford H-Series (Class 8 COE; "Two Story Falcon" variant of C-Series)
- Ford L-Series (Class 7-8 conventional)

== See also ==
- List of Ford engines
