= Truck tent =

Tent designed for use in the bed of a pickup truck

A truck tent is a tent designed to be set up in the bed of a pickup truck.

Truck tents provide an experience of camping outdoors, but with the added protection and comfort of sleeping off the ground. Truck tents are similar in look and function to roof tent and sport utility vehicle (SUV) tents. Limitations of using a truck tent are that the campsite is bound by where the truck can go, and that one must own a truck to use it.

== Usage ==
Camping with truck tents is a growing movement among less extreme campers who still enjoy the outdoors. Family campers may value truck or SUV tents because they provide better protection from moisture, supply an instant and portable campsite, and allow for increased packing space.

Truck tents are conventional 2–3 person tents that are rigged to hook up to a truck bed. Most truck tents are designed with a particular type of truck in mind, or a truck with certain features—those with dropgates, liftgates, camper tops, short beds, or long beds, etc. The tents either hook in or strap in to several locations around the truck. The initial set-up may take some time, but becomes easier with practice. Once the tent is fitted to a specific truck, set-up is as simple as with a traditional tent. Many proponents choose to put a mattress in the bed of the truck for a more comfortable experience. These mattresses are available in various sizes to fit all trucks. A zip-up window provides access to the cab for trucks that have a rear window. Another type of truck tent is the umbrella-shaped car tents that can be used either as car cover, or as a tent, when removed from the vehicle. Such car tents tend to feature remote controls and can be set up automatically. Such car tents can also work as an awning located right above the truck bed. They feature metal framework which makes them wind-resistant.

== Types ==
- Sportz Truck Ten and Backroadz Truck Tent by Napier Outdoors
- Rightline Gear
- Kodiak Canvas
- Adventure Truck Tent by ENEL, LLC
- Car Umbrellas

== Materials ==
International quality standards for tents require specific materials for camping tents, including truck tents: PU 68D polyester and 68D breathable polyester. To meet the American and Canada CPAI-84 tents regulations, all polyester fabrics for tents have to meet fire resistance standards. The shape and design, however, are not restricted by the standards, nor are the manufacturing technology and materials used for straps and stitches. Normally, truck tents feature tape sealed seams for water installation and weather protection. The poles are made of aluminum, steel or shock-corded fiberglass. Straps are polypropylene ropes of whatever diameter is convenient for installation.

== Manufacturers ==
Because truck tent camping is a somewhat novel idea, few companies produce the equipment. Napier and The Adventure Truck Tent are among the most notable names in truck tent camping, followed by Rightline Gear, which brands its truck tents under the name CampRight. Although most truck tents are fundamentally similar, they do feature some variation. Napier's truck tents are completely enclosed, which means that a layer of tent covers the bottom of the truck bed. By contrast, the Adventure Truck Tent and CampRight truck tents leave the bottom bare. Napier tents also include a small awning for added rain protection. Kodiak is known for its tunnel shape design which promotes a roomier camping.

== History ==
The first truck tent was invented by Roman Napieraj and his twin sister Christina Milan the founders of Napier Outdoors back in 1990. “A big part of motocross is camping on-site. Competitors, crew and spectators camp—it’s part of the lifestyle,” he explained. “Well, I’ve always had bad allergies and the closer to the ground I am, the worse it gets. One night, I decided I was going to do something about it. I headed to a Canadian Tire store, I bought some wooden beams, a tarp, and an air mattress and created my own tent in the back of my truck. It worked out so well that I kept putting this makeshift tent up weekend after weekend. People kept commenting on the setup and giving really positive feedback and then one night, it started to rain buckets. Every camper who could grabbed their tent and put it on their truck bed. I knew right there that I had something—a game changer. There was nothing like it on the market at the time.”
