= Recreational vehicle terms =

Terms used when talking about recreational vehicles

The term recreational vehicle (RV) is often used as a broad category of motor vehicles and trailers which include living quarters for designed temporary accommodation. Types of RVs include motorhomes, campervans, caravans (also known as travel trailers and camper trailers), fifth-wheel trailers, popup campers, truck campers and Park Model RVs.

A large number of terms are used when describing aspects of recreational vehicle usage. Some of these are self-explanatory while others may be unfamiliar to many readers. Some terms, arranged alphabetically, are shown below.

== Terms ==
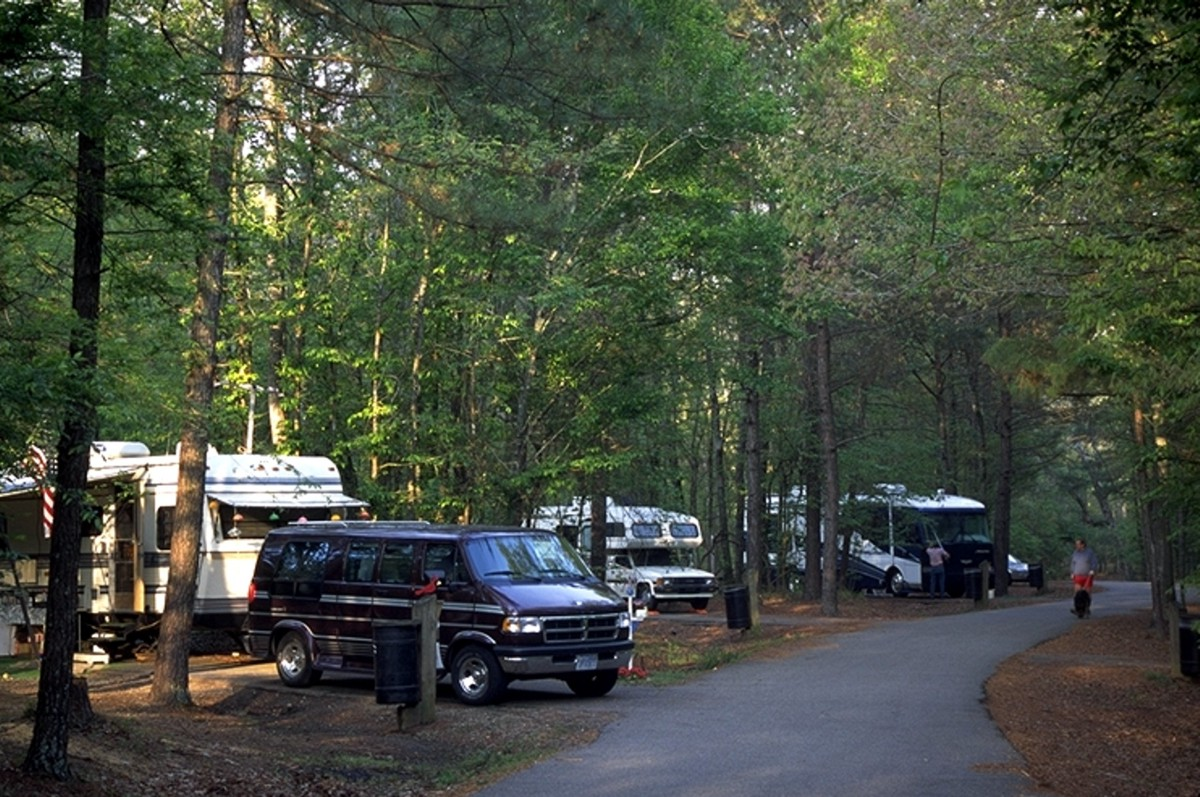
Campers at Chicot State Park, Louisiana

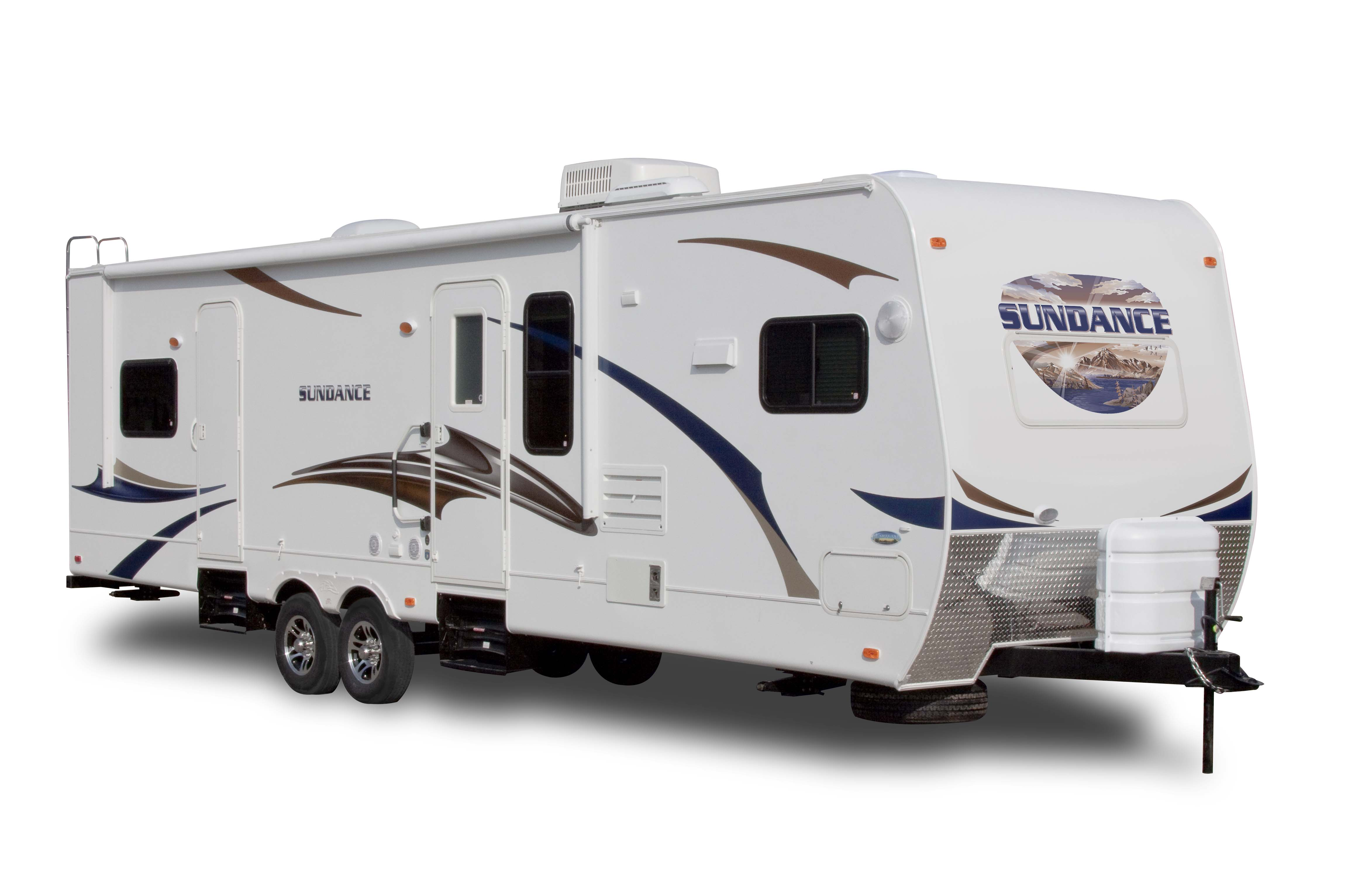
Side view of a 2011 Sundance travel trailer

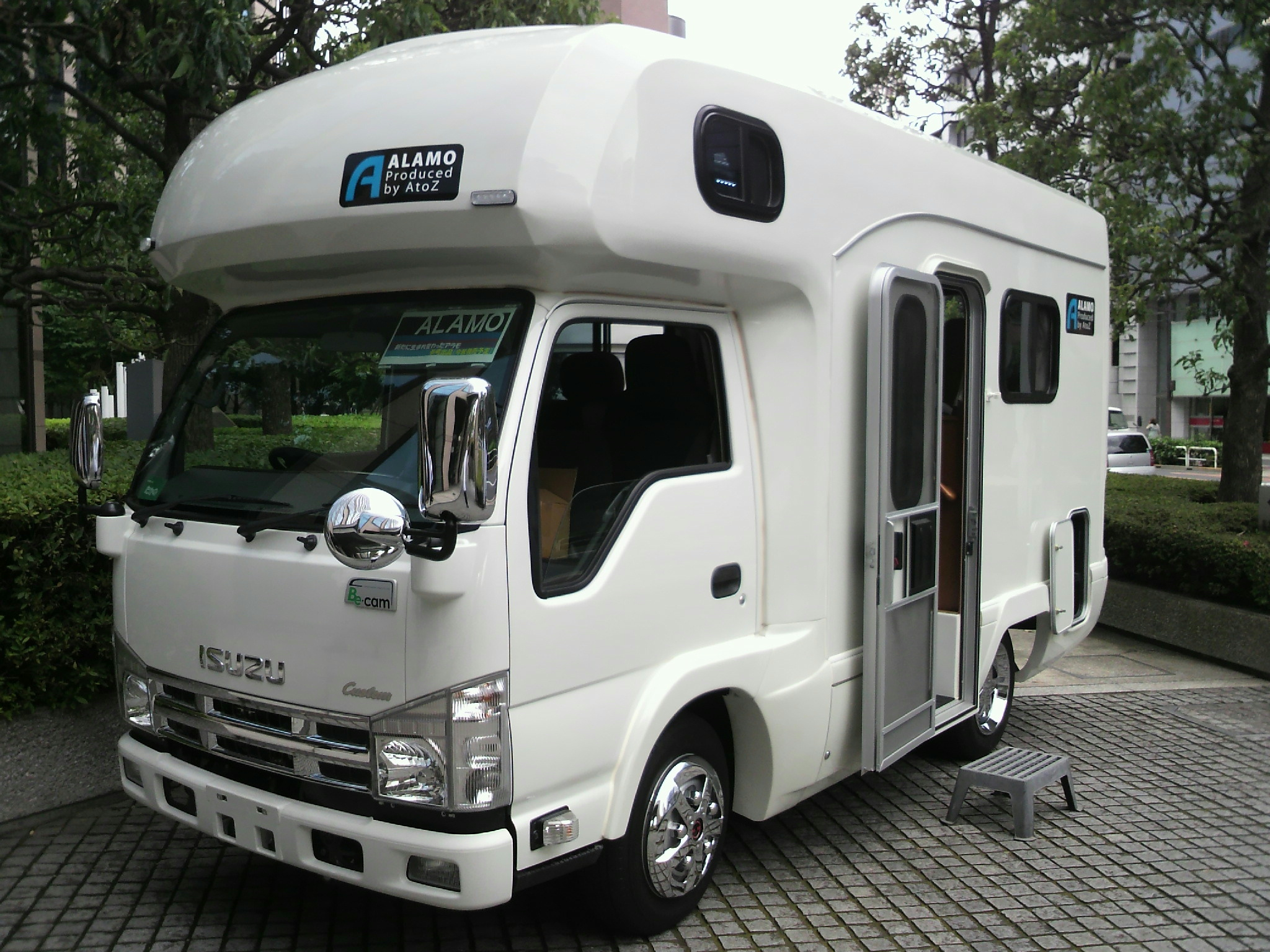
Isuzu ELF 6th gen, standard-cab-type auto-sleeper style recreational vehicle

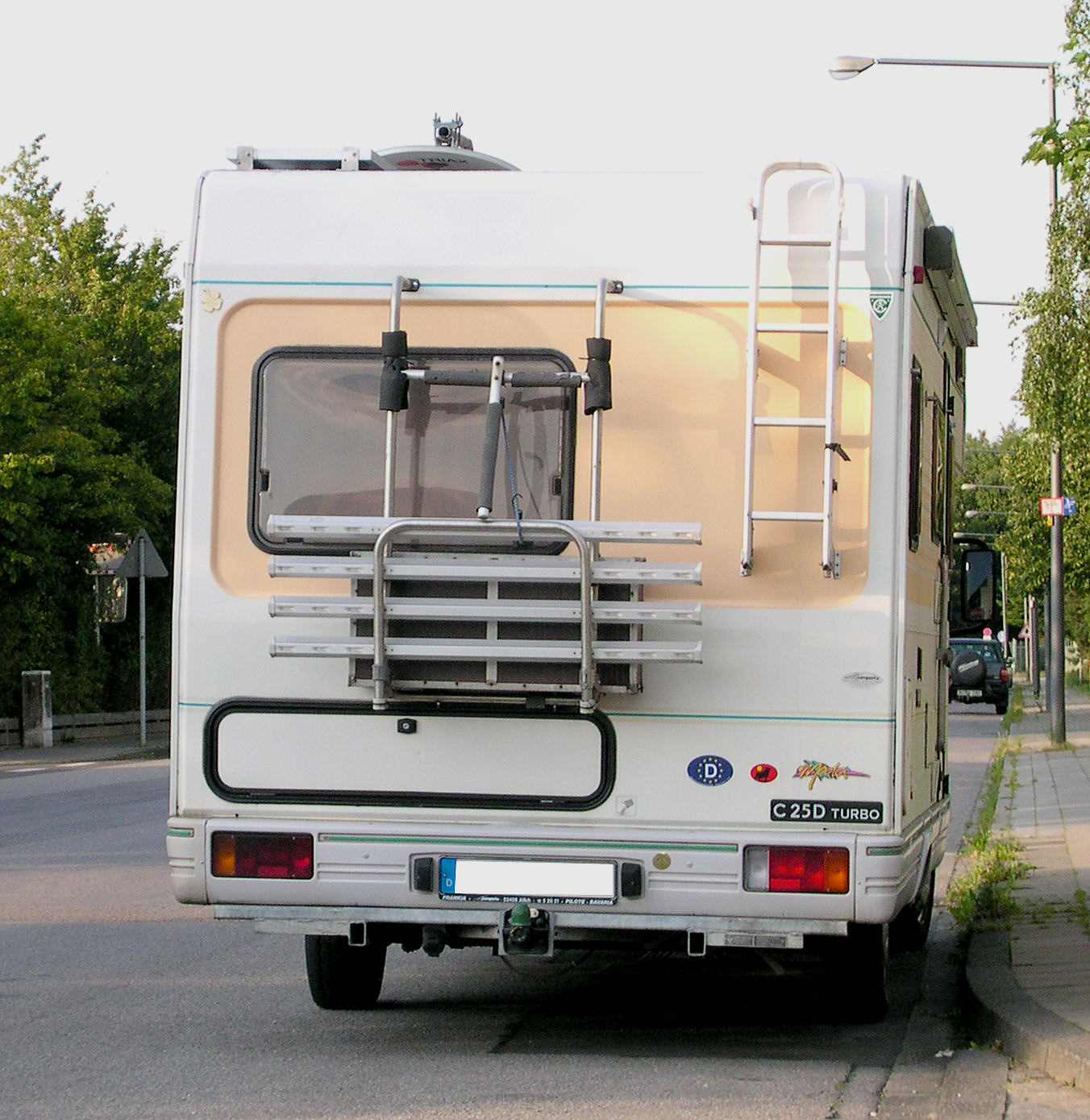
R590 Pilote recreational vehicle

Articulation point
The point where two vehicles are coupled together to allow movement, usually by a ball or fifth wheel hitch.
Awning
On most newer RVs, the manufacturer includes a roll-out awning. The awning is attached to the door-side of the RV and is often about 75% of the length of the RV. The awning can be either manually operated or it can be operated electrically. Another type of awning used by RVers is a portable pop-up canopy or tent that provides a temporary solution to people who want to be outdoors and enjoy shade. The frame usually incorporates an accordion style truss which folds up compactly. Some of these awnings have side curtains that can keep out wind and bugs.
Bull-nose front end
Commonly seen on class A motorhomes where the angle of the front of the vehicle leans forward.
Battery disconnect
A solenoid which is wired first in the 12-volt system that, when activated, opens or closes and turns 12-volt power on or off to that system. Found mostly on motorhomes which will incorporate two disconnect systems: one for the house batteries and one for the chassis batteries. Usually controlled by either manually opening or closing the solenoid by turning it or moving a lever, or electronically operated via a remote switch mounted inside the RV. with a disconnect turned off, that battery circuit is 'dead' and no power will be available from the batteries. Generators and starter motors usually bypass these systems due to high power demands.
Battery isolator
A rectifier or solenoid switch based module of a recreational vehicle that provides charging power from the engine to the house battery and vice versa. (A one-way version of this may be mounted on the engine and provide power only one way, from engine to house battery.) The isolator also prevents power use by the circuits drawing on the house battery from also draining the engine or vehicle battery. Some RVs provide a momentary-on switch that flips a relay to form a temporary high-current connection between the two sets of batteries, enabling the driver to use the house batteries to help start the engine should the engine batteries prove weak. RVers that lack such a switch should carry a set of high-current-rated jumper cables to stretch between the two batteries to accomplish the same end.
Blackwater
Wastewater from the RV toilet; human waste.
Blackwater tank
The tank that stores the blackwater. When full, the operator of the RV will connect a sewer hose from the blackwater tank to a suitable sewer connection at their camp site or a dump station for emptying. This connection cannot simply be left open: If the water is allowed to constantly drain off, the solids tend to remain behind, eventually producing what is termed "the brown pyramid of death." It can cost hundreds, if not thousands of dollars to replace the blackwater tank in this eventuality. Ensure the tank approaches full; then empty it all at once, followed always by the graywater.
Blackwater tank flush
A pipe built into the blackwater holding tank that is connected to a source of pressurized water via a hose that is used to help flush solids from the holding tank at a dump site. If using a black water tank flush system in a campsite, the use of a back-flow preventer on the end of the hose to prevent sewage from flowing into the potable water system is recommended. The tank should be flushed with water upon every second tank draining, with normal use. The tank should also be sprayed any time the sensors appear erratic.
Brake controller
A device used to control the electric brakes on the trailer. Taking power from the tow vehicle's battery, it is activated by sensing voltage to the brake lights. Upon this signal it sends power, through the seven-way plug at the rear, to the electromagnets inside the trailer's brake drums, activating the brakes. Usually adjustable to control the amount of braking power applied as well as incorporating manual operation to allow the trailer brakes to be activated independently from the tow vehicle brakes. Some models also incorporate G-force sensors which will apply the trailer brakes when it senses a deceleration.
Chemicals (for wastewater tanks)
A variety of commercially produced chemicals that are added to the blackwater and graywater tanks to control odours. Commonly referred to as "blue" or "green", the latter being designed to be less harmful to the environment. "Blue" chemicals may or may not kill the bacteria in the tanks and may or may not have an adverse effect on septic systems. Some "green" wastewater tank chemicals contain enzymes that are supposed to control odors and help break down the organic materials in the wastewater. Many chemicals are available with either a strong masking scent or odor-free. Lower-priced RV toilets may require the masking scent.
City water hookup
A fitting on the outside of the RV, allowing a water hose to be connected to provide fresh water from an external, pressurized, supply. The quality of such supplies are variable. Many RVs have built-in water filters. Some owners carry a simple external filter they use when the need arises.
Converter
An electrical device that is usually supplied built-in the RV by the manufacturer. The converter takes AC power from a campground electrical hookup (shore power) or generator and converts that power to 12 volts DC for use in the vehicle. Converters also charge the house batteries.
DeWinterize
The process of preparing your Recreational Vehicle for the upcoming season of use. Typically this is done at the end of winter. It is a process of draining Anti-freeze, running lines, and taking out all of the elements used to prevent freezing during the colder winter months.
Dog house
A cover for the engine compartment, between the driver and passenger seat, could possibly be covered in yellowish-green shag carpet and have a small card table propped above it.
Diesel pusher
A motorcoach with its engine in the rear, instead of the front. For many years, all such coaches featured diesel engines. Later, some manufacturers began placing their conventional gasoline engines in the rear, as well. In both cases, the generator is displaced to the front of the coach. The most notable benefit of this scheme to the travelers is noise reduction. When traveling, the occupants sit in the front, with the engine typically 20 to 30 feet behind them, instead of roaring between them. When the occupants settle into the back bedroom at night, the generator, typically 25 to 35 feet in front of them, becomes virtually silent to them.
Dry bath
A bathroom in an RV where the toilet and shower are in separate areas of the bathroom typically separated by a shower curtain.
Dry camping (boondocking)
Is camping in a campground or any area without water, electricity and sewage hookups, including parking lots or driveways. In the United States, most campgrounds operated by the US Department of the Interior (BLM, National Park Service, National Monuments, National Wildlife Areas) and US Department of Agriculture (National Forests, National Grasslands), as well as many state and county campgrounds do not have full hookups for water, sewage or electricity. Dry camping is made more comfortable by having:
1. A supply of potable water storage within the RV
2. Enough house-battery power to supply basic camping needs (low voltage lights, water pump, control portion of refrigerator, etc.)
3. A means of recharging the house battery(s), such as solar panels or generators
4. Enough wastewater tank capacity to contain the wastewater for several days of camping
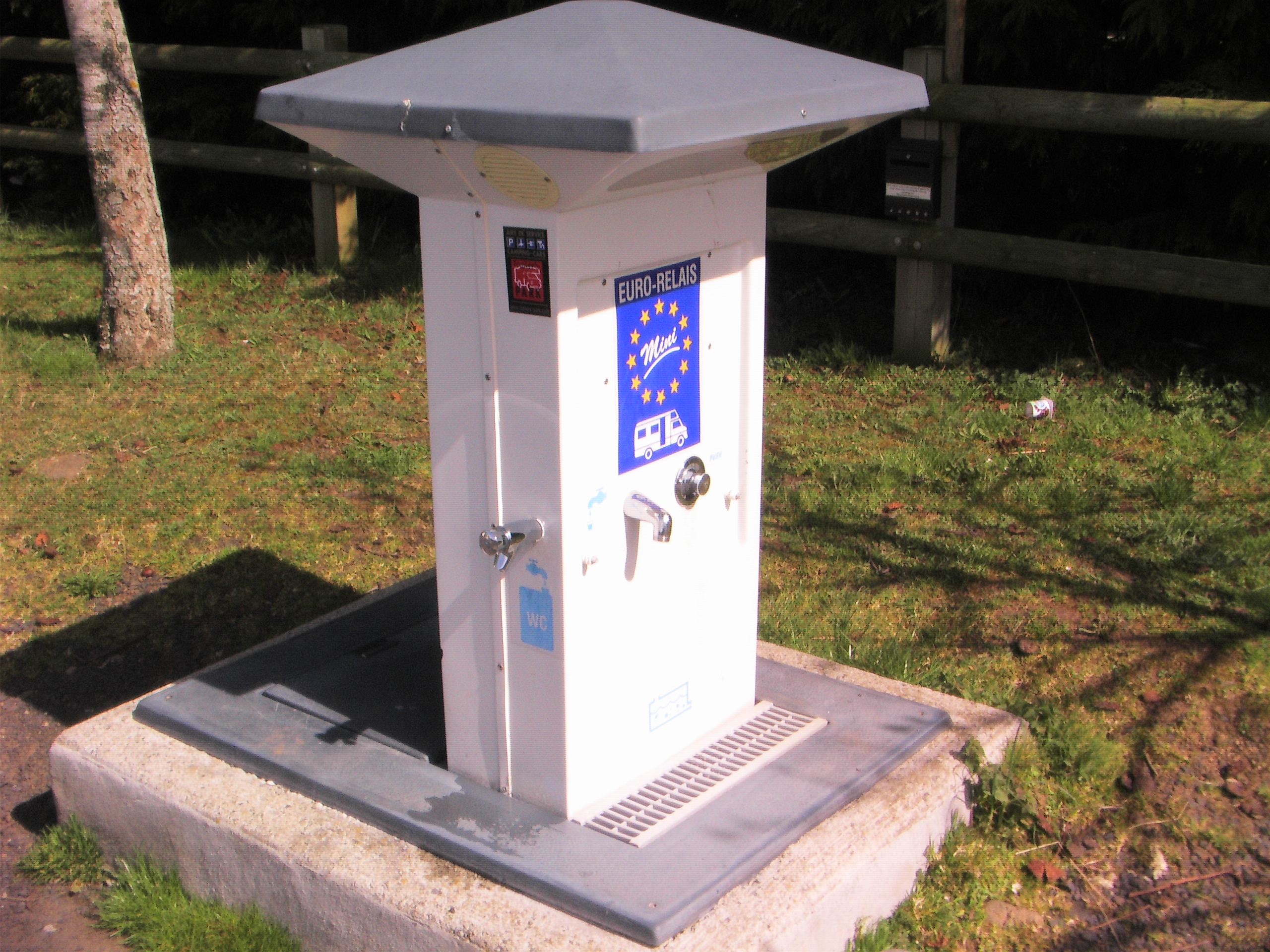
  Dump station in Valuejols, France
Dump station
A place where RV waste-water tanks are emptied. Usually a small concrete pad with a 3- to 4-inch brass fitting embedded into the concrete. The fitting accepts a sewer hose from the RV. Sewage dumped into the station goes into a sewer or a septic system. The brass fitting usually has a pivoting cover to keep rocks and other objects out of the dump station piping. Dump stations are usually situated so that an RV can be driven next to the receptacle. Dump stations often have running water for rinsing the RV's sanitary pipes and for cleaning up the dump station pad. This water should not be used to fill an RV's potable water tank. RV etiquette demands that the user of an RV dump station cleans up any spills.

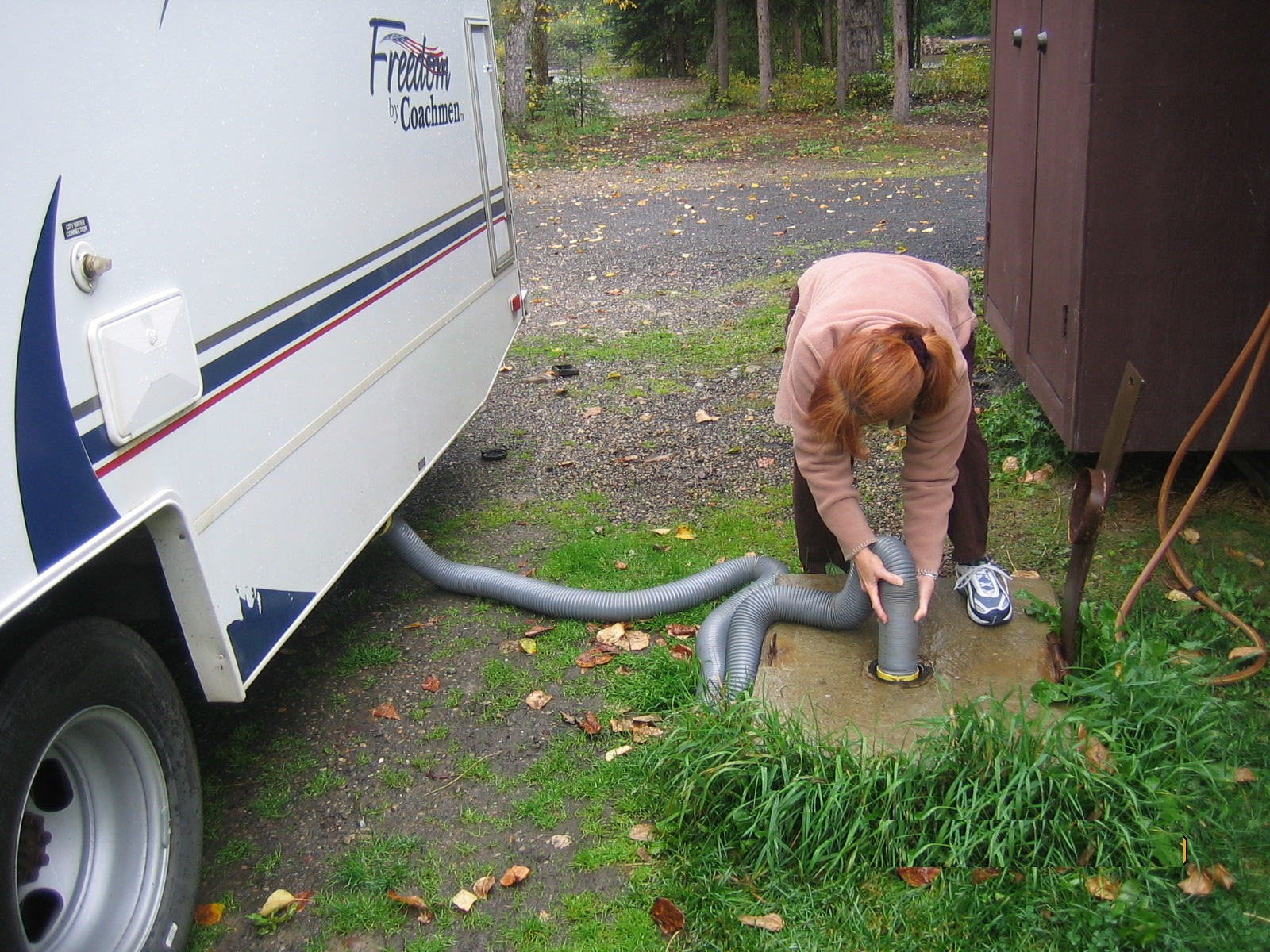
Dumping at an RV campground in Canada

Dumping, dumping tanks
The act of emptying the waste tanks. Tanks should always be emptied in sequence, with blackwater first, graywater second. This enables the soapy graywater to wash the blackwater out of the sewer hose strung from RV to receptacle, leaving the hose (relatively) clean.
Electric trailer brakes
On travel trailers and fifth-wheel trailers, usually over a certain weight, a supplemental system of stopping the rig is needed. Within the towing vehicle's cab is a trailer brake device that uses the towing vehicle's 12-volt DC current to apply a current to electrically-operated wheel brakes on the trailer's wheels.
Engine battery(s)
Batteries in a motor home dedicated to the operation of the vehicle's engine, as opposed to the living quarters, they being supplied with their own separate "house batteries." Engine batteries have thin plates with much surface, a design that ensures they can deliver the high currents needed to start a motor vehicle. These thin plates, however, are quickly destroyed when the battery is deeply discharged, making them unsuitable as house batteries.

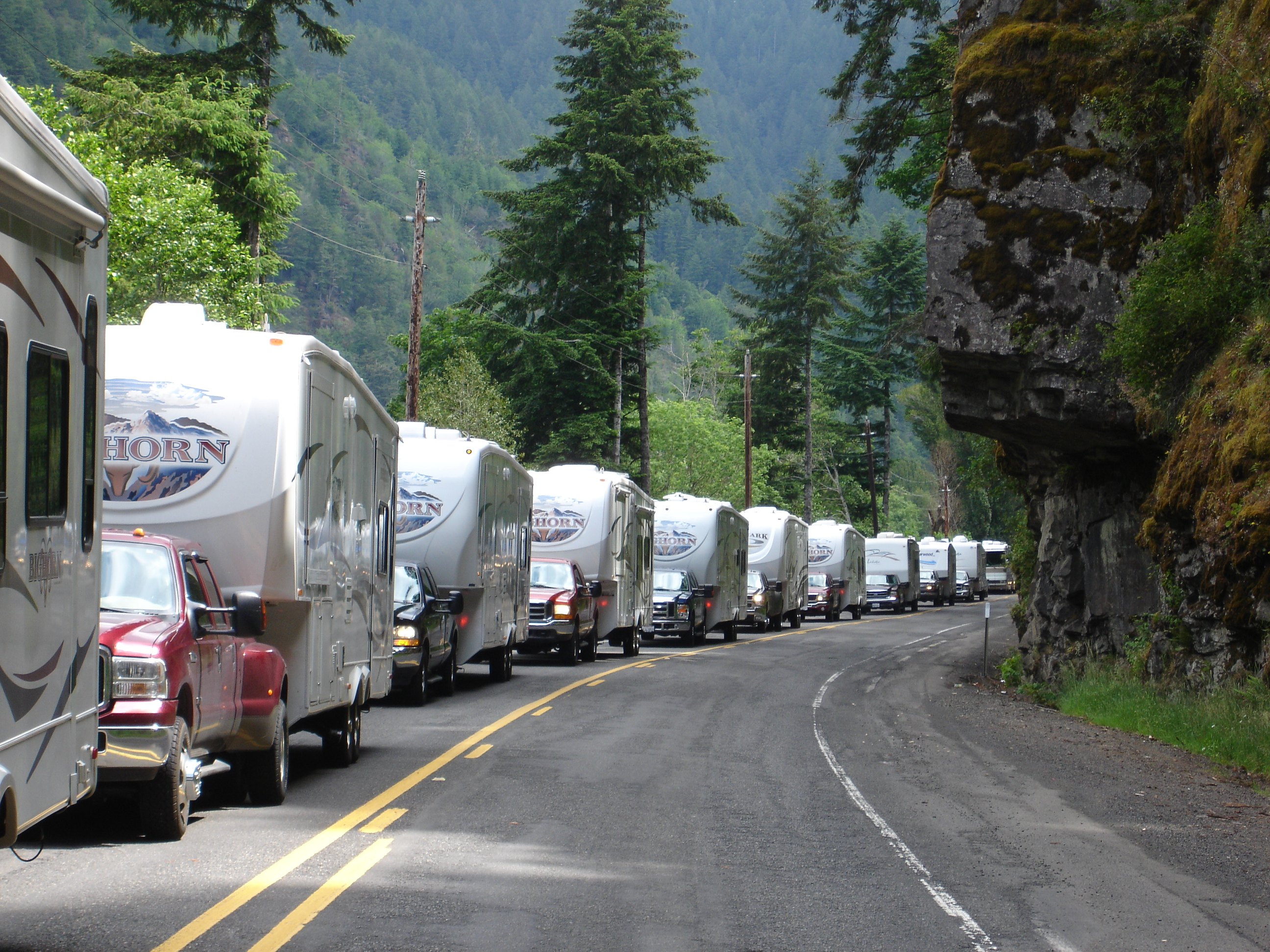
Group of fifth-wheel RVs on the way to the Summer 2009 Oregon Rally in Winchester, Oregon

Fifth wheel coupling
The fifth wheel coupling or hitch provides the link between a fifth-wheel trailer and the towing truck. Newer fifth-wheel hitches are pivoted in two dimensions to ease hitching up and to give the truck and trailer more freedom of movement together. Some models are called sliding-fifth-wheel hitches because the entire hitch assembly can be rolled from its forward towing position to a more rearward position for backing up and maneuvering in tight situations. This allows the driver of a fifth-wheel trailer more leeway in making sharp turns and not having the front of the trailer impact the cab of the truck.
Fresh water tank
Storage tank for fresh water when "dry camping" or on the road. This water should be used or drained periodically to ensure it stays fresh, and the manufacturer's instructions for "winterizing" the coach should be followed if this tank or any piping within the RV is subject to freezing.
Full hookup
A campsite featuring water, electric, and sewer connections.
Full-timer
In RV parlance, a person who lives 100% of the time in the RV. Typical full-timers would include retired couples who have sold or rented out their immovable domiciles, favoring a life on the road. (US insurance companies specializing in RV insurance normally set the threshold between full-time and part-time at five or six months, depending on the carrier, so from the standpoint of insurance, someone spending as little as five months and one day on the road in a single year might be considered full-time, paying an increased premium.)
Gasoline pusher
See Diesel pusher
Generator
A gasoline, diesel or propane-powered device for generating 120 or 240 volts AC electrical power for use when boondocking or dry camping. Generators are rated by their electrical output, usually in watts. A minimum generator size for a small RV would be 1500 to 2000 watts. To run an RV air conditioner, a minimum of 3,000 watts is usually needed. Larger RVs with multiple air conditioners require generators with 6,000 and more watts of capacity. Generators also charge the house batteries. Generators are common in North America but very unusual in Europe, where their noise would be an unpopular intrusion to the rural calm of a campsite. (In North America, organized campgrounds will have "quiet hours", typically stretching from 7 pm or 9 pm to 7 am or 8 am, during which generators are not allowed to be run.)
Gravity fill
An external fill point for filling the fresh water tank made up of a large diameter hose that runs into the tank and incorporates a hole in the side of the RV which allows water to be fed, via a water hose, into the tank using gravity alone. A smaller diameter 'vent' hose is usually installed alongside to allow air to escape the tank when filling. Some motorhomes offer both a gravity fill and pressure fill, the latter having an automatic cutoff. The gravity fill may add more water than the pressure fill (or sometimes more than intended), making topping off with gravity fill a good option before a long dry-camping session (camping in an area without water, sewerage, electricity, etc. hookups).
Graywater
Waste water from the sinks and showers. It is not truly "clean", but it is not as "dirty" as "blackwater." It is called graywater because it looks gray from detergents in the water. RVers who have ignored the LED warnings will receive a secondary indication of a full graywater tank when the lowest drain backs up, usually the shower. This can become of particular importance for RVers with washing machines. They should ensure the sewer hose is connected and the graywater valve open before turning on the washer and wandering away from their coach. RV washer/dryers use large amounts of water, and that water will go somewhere.
Graywater has the important role of washing out the sewer hose, as RVers empty the blackwater first, then the soapy graywater in sequence. Problem: While the blackwater tank must be kept closed until full, many campers normally keep the graywater tank open when connected to a sewer pipe. RVers soon learn to monitor the blackwater level and, as it approaches full, they close the graywater valve to store water for when it becomes necessary to empty the blackwater and flush the hose. Otherwise, the operator must literally send fresh water down the (sink) drain until sufficient water has been collected, around a quarter tank, for a good flush.
Older RVs might not have a gray water tank, in that case an aftermarket will have to be purchased, connect a hose if full service or use a 5-gallon bucket.
Greenwater
Water that has been recycled for reuse, typically for the shower, but greenwater systems can also be used for the clothes washer. Greenwater is usually graywater, or water directly from the shower drain, that has been sufficiently filtered for reuse in the shower. Some shower greenwater systems use a greenwater tank in which greenwater is stored for later use.
Since fresh water is precious when boondocking away from a public potable water source, greenwater systems that recycle shower water and allow showers of unlimited duration are becoming popular RV modifications. Few, if any, US manufacturers include greenwater systems in their RV's at this time. Therefore, most greenwater RV installations are custom installed.
Although greenwater systems vary, many greenwater shower systems are composed of a water pump and several filters of decreasing particle size followed by an antimicrobial UV light filter. Water from the shower drain is pumped through the filters and UV light and then sent back to the shower head. In addition to saving water, a greenwater shower system also saves whatever energy is required to heat the water since the recycled water is still warm from the last pass through the system.
If the filters used in the greenwater system have sufficient flow to pass directly to the shower head, then the system is considered a continuous greenwater system. However, some filters, such as reverse osmosis, cannot produce adequate flow for continuous use so greenwater from these filter systems must be stored in a greenwater tank until a sufficient quantity has been collected for showering. These are called Banked greenwater systems.
Although reverse osmosis greenwater systems produce purer water, they have more restrictions due to the membranes used and are of higher cost and complexity. The reverse osmosis membrane has limitations on the maximum TDS (Total Dissolved Solids) which limits the number of times the water can be reused before it has to be dumped. Also, excessively warm water can damage the membrane as well.
While greenwater shower systems can potentially allow showers of unlimited duration, they are not without their caveats. Most systems require extra maintenance to keep the filters clean. All systems need electricity to run the water pump(s), but this can be provided by PV solar. With continuous greenwater systems, odors and poor quality water can sometimes make it through the filters.
High voltage
Refers to shore power, generator power or power from a power inverter, which is AC at the standard household voltage and frequency of one's country, used to run air conditioners, televisions and stereo systems, microwave ovens, electrical refrigerators, electric space heaters and electric water heaters. It also powers AC outlets in the RV for electrical devices such as toasters, hair dryers, computers, printers and so on. (Strictly, "AC" only means that the polarity reverses many times per second, but in an RV it may be assumed to mean high voltage.)
Holding tanks
Tanks built in or mounted under the floor, used for storage of blackwater and graywater. Separate tanks are used for blackwater and graywater, often adding an extra tank for the shower or washing machine, if equipped. Tank level is monitored by an LED display inside the RV and all tanks drain to a single external hook up point for dumping. Usually found on American RVs where almost every RV in production incorporates holding tanks.
House battery
The batteries, usually 12 volts DC, that are installed on or within an RV and dedicated to operating lights, appliances, etc., within the living area. These are known in the United Kingdom as 'leisure batteries'. Usually, there are multiple batteries combined in a parallel circuit which keep 12 volts but increase the current, but there may be a single house battery on some smaller RV's. The house batteries are separate and isolated electrically from the vehicle batteries, known in this context as engine batteries that are used to start and operate the motor vehicle part of the RV (motor of a motorhome, car or truck for tow vehicles or campers).
RV batteries differ from car or truck batteries in that they are 'deep cycle' batteries. This means that RV batteries can be drawn down further before recharging than car or truck batteries without damage. For best RV battery life, users should not draw down the charge below 50% before recharging. Deep cycle batteries that are well maintained and cared for can last ten years or more, whereas RV batteries that are poorly maintained and abused will last only a year or two. Batteries are rated in ampere-hours; multiplying this figure by the battery voltage yields watt-hours, which indicates the length of time a known load can be run.
Hub and spoke
A travel pattern of many RVers that reduces their overall fuel expenses and carbon footprint, as well as the frequency (and bother) of breaking camp. RVers will drive/tow their RV from, for example, Phoenix to Tucson, 115 miles (185 km) away. They will then spend a week or two exploring southern Arizona using their tow vehicle or towed vehicle, leaving the heavy RV parked in their campground. The "hub" is the campground, the "spokes" are the routes fanning out from their campground that they take on their various day-trips. Some RVers extend the hub and spoke pattern one more level by carrying bicycles, Segways, or other low-carbon conveyances on their day-trip vehicle to tour/explore their various day-trip destinations. Again using the above example, a pair of full or part-time RVers might break camp and move the 115 miles (185 km) between Phoenix and Tucson, averaging 8.5 mpg_{‑US} (28 L/100 km); but then travel 300 miles (480 km) in the ensuing fortnight in their towed car, a hybrid, averaging 40 mpg_{‑US} (5.9 L/100 km). Add another 50 miles (80 km) together on their two Segways, at the equivalent of 275 mpg_{‑US} (0.86 L/100 km) each, and the overall fuel economy for the leg of their trip involving Tucson works out to 21.7 mpg_{‑US} (10.8 L/100 km) overall.
Inverter/charger
An inverter/charger, most often called an inverter, both charges the 12-volt house battery(s) and inverts the 12 DC power from the house batteries into AC power at the standard household voltage and frequency for one's country. Inverters are not usually supplied in low-priced RVs by the RV manufacturer. Inverters are rated by their output, in volt-amps (generally equivalent to watts.
There are two categories of inverters. The least expensive are called 'modified sine-wave' or 'quasi-sine wave' inverters. The more expensive versions are 'sine-wave' or 'full sine-wave' inverters. The modified- or quasi-sine wave inverters work well for most RV uses, but most inverter manufacturers recommend the use of full sine wave inverters to power televisions, VCR players and recorders, DVD players, computers, printers, fax machines and other electronic devices.
Like a generator, inverters must be sized to accommodate the anticipated electrical load. Most inverters in RVs are rated at 1500–2000 watts. This is enough power to run a microwave oven or run a TV, DVD and computer but not at the same time as the microwave. The number of watt-hours that can be provided; how long a given load can be run; depends on the battery, after allowing for the slight inefficiency of the inverter. Heavy electrical loads like air conditioners, space heaters, water heaters and refrigerator/freezers cannot be powered by an inverter as the house battery(s) do not have enough watt-hours and would be run down quickly.
King-pin support
A king-pin support is used on a fifth-wheel trailer to give the front of the trailer more stability. It is usually a tripod that attaches to the king-pin of the fifth-wheel trailer hitch. Most are adjustable with a hand crank.
Landing gear
On a fifth-wheel trailer these are two jacks that are usually coupled together and are motor driven, that lift the front of the fifth-wheel trailer up so that the truck can be driven under the front and hitch-up. Once hitched up, the landing gear jacks are raised to their stowed position for traveling.
Leveling jacks
Installed under the RV help to get the vehicle level once it has a place to stay. Many newer class A motorhomes and some fifthwheel trailers have computer-controlled leveling jacks that, at the touch of a button, automatically extend and level the RV. (Some high-end motorhomes even use airbags that automatically raise the motorhome into a level position on its own tires, eliminating leveling jacks completely.) On trailers, the manufacturer often installs rear leveling jacks that are either lowered by hand crank or a motor to give the rear of the trailer more stability.
Low voltage
Low voltage refers to electricity supplied to and derived from the house batteries, typically 12 volts DC. This electricity is used to run lights, the water pump, the control portion of a refrigerator, the igniters for cooktops, smoke and gas detectors, fans, jack and slide-out motors, and often the blower and control circuits of a built-in propane furnace.
Motor Coach
A vehicle that is built upon a commercial truck or bus chassis. Not just a motorhome, these are the higher end of mobile living. These include conversion buses.
Part-timer
A person who spends several months per year, but less than full-time in the RV. (US insurance companies specializing in RV insurance normally set the threshold between full-time and part-time at five or six months, depending on the carrier.)
Pink water
Refers to water to which 'pink' antifreeze has been added. This is done in cold climates to keep the internal plumbing pipes and tubing from freezing and breaking. The pink water is typically propylene glycol and water. (The −50 °F (−46 °C) commercial product is 40:60.) Pink dye is used to imply that it is not toxic. Normal antifreeze (an ethylene glycol and water mixture) is colored green or blue to show that it is a toxic chemical.
Refrigerator
Most RV refrigerators are "absorption cycle", rather than "compressor cycle" appliances (Also see RV Fridge). These operate by the direct application of heat to the refrigerant, without the use of a pump, unlike most domestic refrigerators. In recent years, specialized 12-volt-DC-operated compressor-type refrigerators have been developed and are being used in some RVs.
The typical RV (absorption) refrigerator uses either propane or electricity as a heat source. Most operate on propane or AC (two-way), while some add 12 volts DC (three-way). Three-way (powered) RV refrigerators draw too much current to be powered by the house batteries, but may run on 12-volt DC power while the vehicle engine is running, a generator is running or the RV is connected to shore power. Newer models use 12 volts DC to control electronics that switch power sources automatically. Absorption refrigerators are very sensitive to being level and do not function unless reasonably level. However, newer RV refrigerators are less sensitive to being run out of level.
Anyone planning a long ferry ride with an RV should bear in mind that it is impossible to run the fridge while on board, where gas bottles must be turned off, and electricity is seldom provided.

Video shots of the interior and exterior of a motorhome.

RV cam
Rear vision (or view) camera system, usually comprising one or more video cameras mounted at the rear of the vehicle, connected to a monitor mounted in view of the driver. Variations include infrared night vision, color and the addition of sound.
RV mattress
RV mattresses are usually made out of foam. One reason behind this is mattress quality, and the other reason is that custom shape and size mattresses aren't manufactured by every mattress factory, so mattresses need to be shipped. Foam mattresses can be rolled up without losing quality, thus shipping prices are smaller than in the case of innerspring mattresses, the large size of the latter would occur larger delivery costs.
Both size and shape can vary from RV to RV. Not only width and length should be considered when choosing an RV mattress, but height as well. The height of the mattress should be chosen depending on the place of the bed, for example thinner mattresses are recommended in pop-up trailers, bunks or overhead cabs. RV mattresses can come in different shapes: rectangular, cut corner, symmetrical cut corners, rounded corners etc. The usual minimum warranty for an RV mattress is 5 years.
Within the foam RV mattress category there are different levels of quality as well, depending on the density of the foam the manufacturer uses – the higher the density the better the foam. Also, Foam RV mattresses need to be heavy duty, in order to maintain the same level of quality for a longer period of time – regular foam mattresses can lose their properties quickly in extreme temperatures and in RVs temperatures can be extreme, from hot in summer to cold in the winter.
RV shower
Is a method of showering that conserves water, wastewater tankage and battery power in a motorhome, trailer or camper while dry camping. The total time for the water being on is typically under 2 minutes and often less. The RV shower is similar to a navy shower. Owners of smaller vehicles seldom use the shower in the van, preferring to use the campground showers.
Sanitary station
In Europe, black water is usually collected in a portable toilet with a detachable tank which is carried to the sanitary station. Sometimes referred to as a Thetford, Porta Potti or an Elsan (from commercial names), this tank has a small amount of 'blue' or 'green' added to it each time it is emptied, to manage odours. The sign for a sanitary station usually includes the word 'chemical' in one form or another.
Sewer hose
An RVer cannot spend too much money on a proper sewer hose, but can easily spend too little. A cheap, thin-walled hose that has developed small holes either through abrasion or UV damage since its last use does not leak, it sprays: The top of a full blackwater tank may be three feet or more above the level of a failing hose, bearing a lot of pressure. One must particularly be wary of free starter kits given upon RV purchase; even motorhomes approaching half-million dollars in cost may be supplied with a thin hose that starts spraying in less than a week. A proper hose, well maintained, will last for a long time, reducing what could be an onerous task into an abstract, odor-free procedure of pulling a couple valves in sequence, in which the only fluids ever witnessed are a few drops of soapy graywater fresh from the sink or shower, upon disconnecting.
Shore power
Electricity that is available to an RV from a power company. The minimal service in US campgrounds is a standard two-prong with ground 120-volt AC outlet with 15–20 amperes. Most newer US campgrounds with electrical hookups offer three outlets in the connection box: two-prong with ground 120-volt AC 20 amperes; three-prong RV 120-volt AC 30 amperes; and a four-prong RV 120/240-volt AC 50 amperes (which can power 120-volt loads and the large 240-volt loads at the same time). A variety of plug converters are available from RV supply houses to convert from one type of plug to another. High voltage can injure or kill when wired incorrectly, and the fact that an appliance works does not mean that it is wired correctly. A simple 50-to-30 ampere or 30-to-15 ampere converter from a major supplier may be assumed safe. A special adapter, picked up at a card-table booth at an RV show that enables the user to plug into two 30 ampere circuits at once to get 60 amperes for their 50-ampere coach may "smoke" the campground's equipment, if not the user.
In the United Kingdom and most of the rest of Europe, 240-volt power is supplied through a 16-ampere socket which is designed for outdoor use. In continental Europe, although the socket is rated at 16 amperes, the circuit is often limited to a much lower current, sometimes as low as 3 amperes. Less modern campgrounds may use domestic sockets similar to those found in homes.
Operators of RVs that offer some warning when shore power has been left connected should ensure that their power cord is always laid out and connected first, with water and sewer lines purposely laid to cross the power cord. Because the RV has no way of "knowing" that the operator failed to disconnect either water or sewer, this scheme will ensure that warning is given unless all three lines have been properly put away before the owner is ready to drive off.
The term "shore power" was borrowed from the boating industry/navy; no water is involved, at least if all pipe connections are fastened down thoroughly.

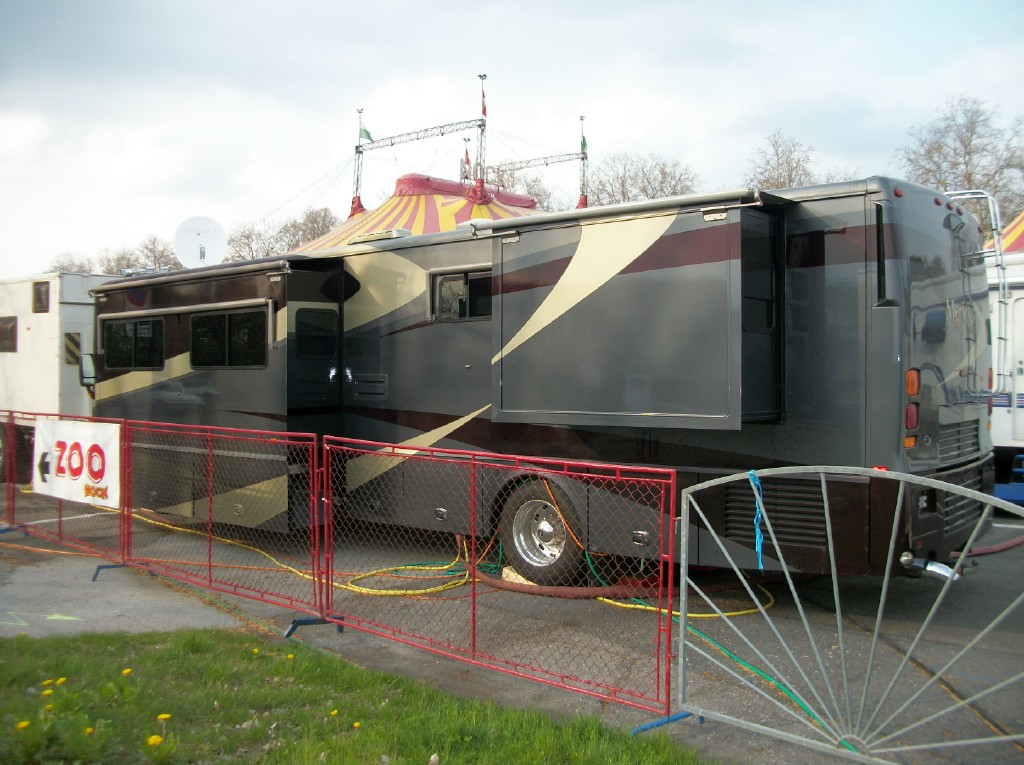
An extendable motorhome at Lausanne, Switzerland

Slide-out
An area of the RV which can be expanded outwards from the side of the vehicle, thus increasing the interior space. Many modern North American RVs feature at least one slide-out section. This is generally used to expand the kitchen and better accommodate the seating area. Newer and larger motorhomes and larger fifth-wheel trailers (over 30 feet) often have three slide-outs: one in the kitchen, one in the living room and one in the bedroom.
Slide-topper
A fixed awning attached to the top of a slide room and the side of the RV. When the room is opened, the awning opens with it, covering the roof of the slide room. Mainly used to keep debris such as leaves and snow from building up on the roof of the slide room. It will open and close with the room by use of spring tension which is applied when rolled out and recoils when the room comes in, closing the awning up.
Solar cell or photovoltaic panel (PV panel)
Solar panels or photovoltaic cells can be installed on the roof of the RV. They produce slightly in excess of 12 volts DC (12.8 to 13). The panel(s) are used to charge the house battery(s) when the RV is not hooked up to shore power or the vehicle's engine is not working or a generator is not present. Photovoltaic cells used on RVs are often 24 inches × 36 inches and produce 100 to 120 watts.

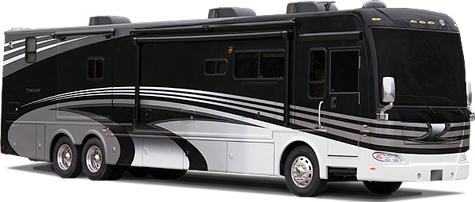
Class A motorhome with a tag axle (Thor Motor Coach 45LT Tuscany Luxury Diesel Motorhome)

Tag axle
Particularly heavy 40- to 45-foot motorhomes are supplied with two rear axles, a drive axle and a passive, weight-bearing (tag) axle. Veteran RV-spotters use the presence of a tag axle (as well as large tire size) to separate out the truly expensive motorhomes from those that just look that way. The presence of a tag axle indicates an interior with features like stone floors, heavy, solid wood cabinetry, and a MPG gauge that quickly sticks at 1.4 when going uphill.
The tag axle is lowered automatically at around six miles per hour, taking up half the load of the rear, heavier end, of the motor coach. The axle is raised below six miles per hour to allow better maneuvering: Were the axle to remain down, turning sharply, as is done at low speeds, would drag the tires of the tag axle sideways across the pavement as the coach pivoted on the drive wheels, just in front of that axle. Coaches when driving in RV parks can often be seen with their tag axles up, causing many helpful observers to tell the coach owner there's something wrong with their coach. On the other hand, some tag-axle owners have saved money on tolls by pointing out to the toll-taker that their coach may have three axles, but, as can be plainly seen, they're only using two of them.
Tow ball weight
Also called tongue weight, this is the downward force exerted on the tow ball by the RV trailer coupling with weight-distribution devices, if any, deactivated.
Tow vehicle
The vehicle that is used to tow an RV trailer.
Towed vehicle or "toad"
A car or other vehicle that is towed behind motorhomes for use when the motorhome is set up in a campground and connected to utilities. Also called a "dinghy." Fairly common in the United States and Canada, less common in Europe, it becomes a virtual necessity for owners of motor coaches stretching 40 or 45 feet, difficult to maneuver in places like supermarket parking lots.
Umbilical cord
The electrical cord that connects the RV trailer to the towing vehicle (car, van, SUV, or truck). This cord brings electricity from the vehicle's alternator to charge the trailer house batteries. The umbilical cord also brings electric current from the vehicle to control the electric brakes, stop and turn lights and night running lights on the trailer.
Weight distributing hitch
A system of springs and levers that transfers part of the tow ball weight onto the front wheels of the towing vehicle and, to a lesser extent, the RV trailer.
Wet bath
A bathroom in an RV where the shower and toilet stall are combined into the same room. That is, the toilet is in the shower. This type of bathroom configuration is typically used to provide restroom facilities with an absolute minimum of space.
White water
This is the fresh water directly taken from a clean-water source. It may or may not be potable water, i.e. drinking water.
Wild camping
A term often used in the UK to refer to staying overnight without a designated camping area.
Winterize
The maintenance of an RV's water system to protect it from damage during cold winter storage. This involves making sure all water is removed from the hoses and tanks using compressed air or adding a non-toxic antifreeze to the system. Some modern RVs are equipped with automatic winterization systems.
