= Autohome =

Autohome may refer to:

- Recreational vehicle, motor vehicle or trailer which provides living accommodations
  - Campervan, an ordinary vehicle which has been fitted out for sleeping and simple cooking
    - Conversion van, van converted for camping and long trips
  - Caravan (trailer), trailer providing a place for sleeping and simple cooking
    - Fifth-wheel trailers, type of (often larger) trailer whose weight sits supported directly over a pickup truck's rear axle
    - Popup camper, also referred to as a tent trailer or folding trailer, which can be collapsed for easy storage and transport
  - Motorhome, a motor vehicle (typically larger) which works as a mobile living accommodation, typically with more features than a campervan
    - Coach (bus), a bus built for longer distance travel
- Truck camper, camping amenity carried in the bed of a pickup truck

== See also ==
- Mobile home, house that is movable, but normally stands in a fixed place
