= Napier Enterprises =

Developer and distributor of vehicle camping tents

- Industry: Vehicle camping tents
- Founded: 1990
- Founder: Roman Napieraj
- Headquarters: St. Catharines, Ontario
- Website: https://napieroutdoors.com/us/

Napier Enterprises (Napier Outdoors) is the world's largest developer and distributor of vehicle camping tents.

== History ==
Napier was started by Roman Napieraj and is twin sister Christina Milan in 1990 and initially developed three models, but today the company has expanded to more than eight. “A big part of motocross is camping on-site. Competitors, crew and spectators camp – it’s part of the lifestyle,” he explained. “Well, I’ve always had bad allergies and the closer to the ground I am, the worse it gets. One night, I decided I was going to do something about it. I headed to a Canadian Tire store, I bought some wooden beams, a tarp, and an air mattress and created my own tent in the back of my truck. It worked out so well that I kept putting this makeshift tent up weekend after weekend. People kept commenting on the setup and giving really positive feedback and then one night, it started to rain buckets. Every camper who could grabbed their tent and put it on their truck bed. I knew right there that I had something – a game changer. There was nothing like it on the market at the time.”

== Location ==
The head office is located in St. Catharines, Ontario, with majority of sales coming from the United States.

== Manufacturing ==
Napier's line includes truck tents, which it invented in 1990, along with SUV/CUV tents, a Roof Top Tent and air mattresses. Napier Enterprises supplies vehicle tents to major North American automotive manufacturers, including General Motors, Ford, Nissan, Honda, MOPAR, and many others. The vehicle camping tents are also sold by major retailers such as Bass Pro Shops, Cabelas, Canadian Tire, etc. Since 1990, Napier has been changing the way people view camping by reshaping and merging the automotive and camping industries together.

== Environmental contributions ==
For every Napier Backroadz tent sold, a tree is planted through the company's partnership with Trees For The Future. It is also partnered with Leave No Trace and Tread Lightly.
