= Living Vehicle =

American off-grid luxury trailer

Living Vehicle (LV) is a self-sustainable vehicle designed to support human habitation with very little to no resource needs from external sources.

LVs are purpose-built to live in year-round, thus they are capable of supporting human habitation in all seasons, including sub-freezing temperatures. They are also able to create and manage resources for continued and indefinite off-grid use.

== Background ==
Designers Matthew and Joanna Hofmann set out to design a stylish off-grid vehicle in 2017. Inspired by years of traveling full-time in mobile spaces while running a custom mobile design firm in Santa Barbara, CA, the Hofmanns felt the need to create a new mobile space designed for a modern mobile lifestyle. LV is offered with very limited production per year.

In 2022, Living Vehicle was the first to release Atmospheric Water Generation in a production vehicle. Since its foundation in 2017, LV comes in different generations and models with diverse specifications.

== Versions ==
The original LV was released in 2019, typically having large windows and skylights to create the outdoor living experience, as well as a large deck area. It was fitted with high-end home appliances.

LV 2020 introduced solar powered air conditioning, using 12 solar panels. Its interior length increased slightly, to 28 feet. Twenty-five LV2020s were to be produced.

== See also ==
- Recreational vehicle
