= Popup camper =

Type of vehicle

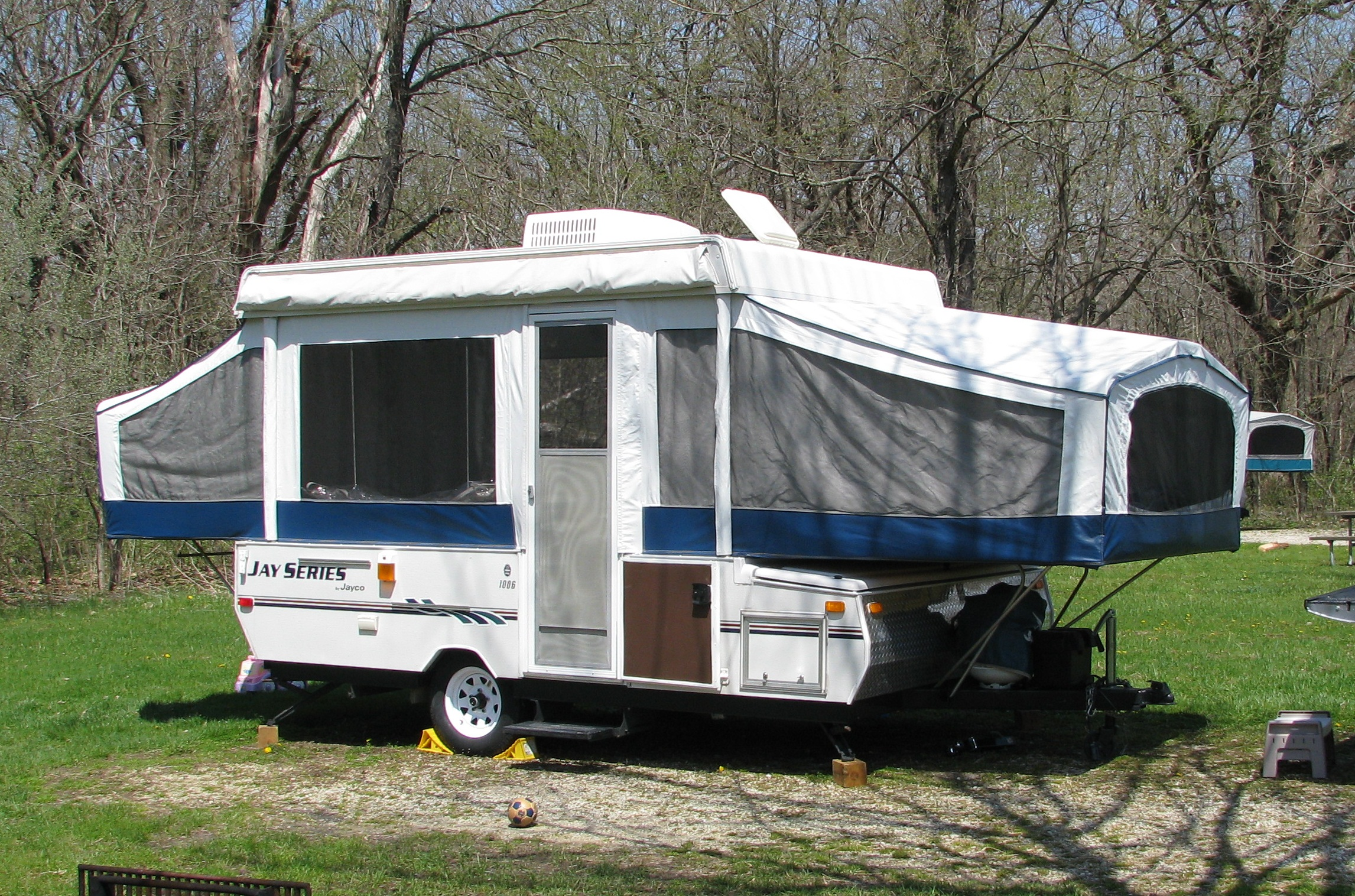
Modern pop-up camper

A pop-up camper, also referred to as a tent trailer or folding trailer, is a type of towable recreational vehicle that can be collapsed for easy storage and transport.

== Features ==
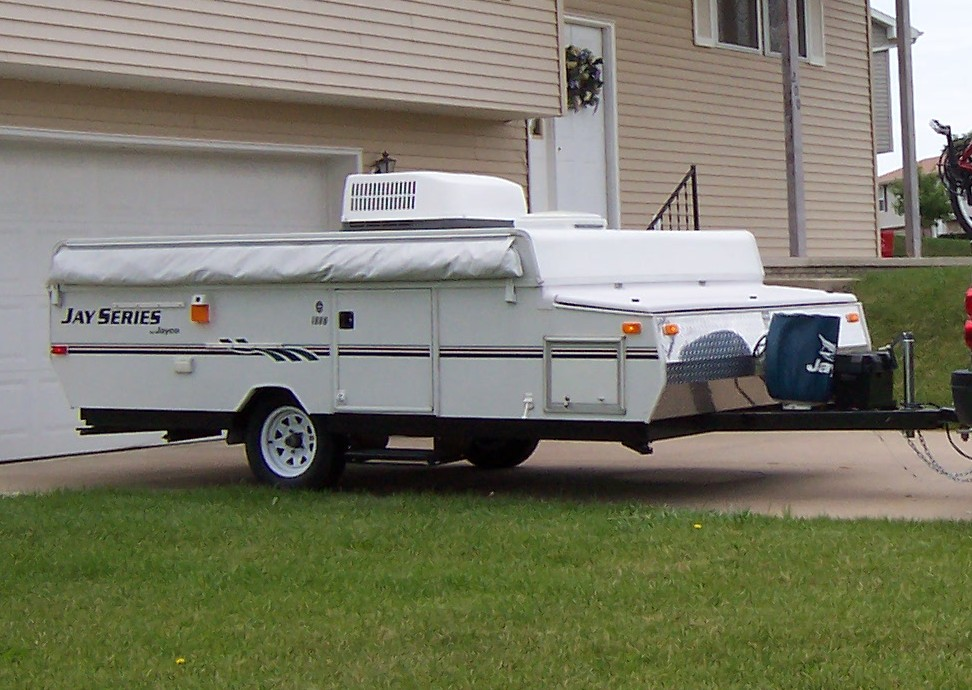
Same pop-up camper closed for travel

A conventional pop-up consists of a trailer frame, a box, a hard roof, pull-out bunks and "soft" walls. The walls are made of vinyl, canvas, or a similar material, and include windows with screens.

Basic popups usually include the following features: fold-down dinette (table top and bench seating combination), on-board fresh water tank, sink, 12-volt DC power system (including an AC to DC converter and a deep cycle battery), interior DC lighting, two sleeping bunks and storage cabinets. Many pop-ups also include a gas or electric absorption refrigerator, stove, rooftop air conditioner, propane furnace, water heater, electric water pump, exterior shower, skylight or roof vent, one or two propane tanks, electric or surge brakes, large storage trunk at the front of the box, and an awning. Some premium models also include a shower, toilet, wastewater tanks, slide-out section (to increase interior space), microwave, and an oven.

Since space is at a premium in popup campers, it is common for a single structure to serve multiple purposes. Generally, the dinette, which can seat four people for a meal, can be converted into a bed to provide additional sleeping space. Likewise, the couch, if present, can usually be folded down into a bed. Often, the inside table (part of the dinette) and the gas stove can be taken outside and attached to the side of the camper.

=== Dimensions ===
Modern pop-ups range in weight from approximately 700 pounds (320 kg) to 3,800 pounds (1,700 kg) pounds empty or full. Models are generally classified by the length of their box, which ranges from 8 feet (2.4 m) to 16 feet (4.9 m). When opened, the length is roughly double the box length. Most pop-ups are between 7 feet (2.1 m) and 7 feet 6 inches (2.29 m) in width and between 4 feet 6 inches (1.37 m) and 5 feet (1.5 m) in height when closed, but "high wall" models are tall. Published sleeping capacities range from 4 to 8 people.

== Types ==
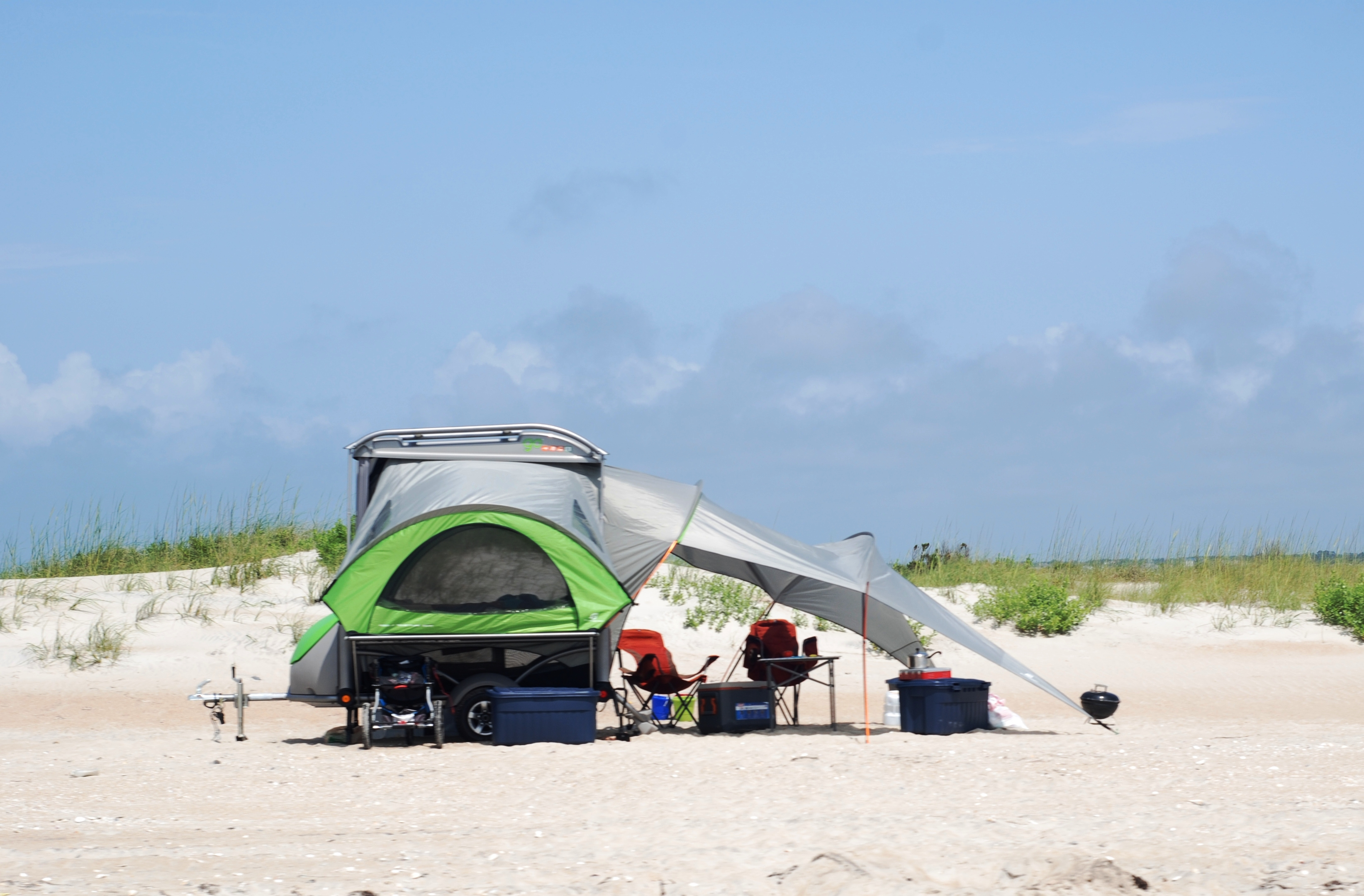
Modern flip-out GO camper

In addition to the traditional pop-up campers described above, there are a number of special types of pop-ups on the market:

High wall pop-ups
Feature a taller box which allows for residential-height countertops and more storage space.
Motorcycle campers
Lightweight pop-ups small enough to be pulled by a motorcycle.
Toyhauler pop-ups
Include an open cargo deck for transporting ATVs, UTVs, motorcycles, etc.
Off-road pop-ups
Feature rugged construction and raised suspension for off road use.
A-frame
small solid wall folding camper.
Flip-out camper
Features a roof which flips over to become a bunk. Uses a tent roof instead of a hard roof. Forward fold, rear fold or double/dual fold. If roof becomes floor, can be soft floor (poly-canvas or polyethylene tarp) or hard floor (fibreglass or metal).
Inflatable trailer
Sets up quickly by blowing compressed air into side walls and roof

== Gallery ==
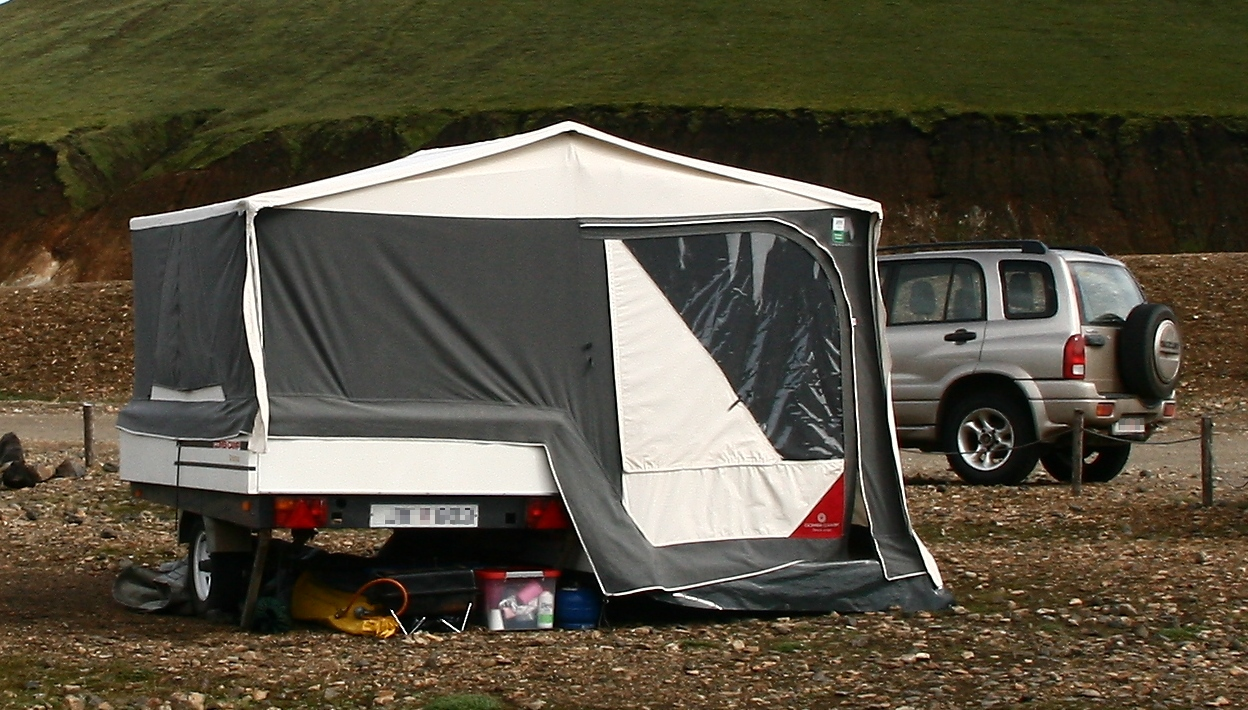
Modern tent trailer

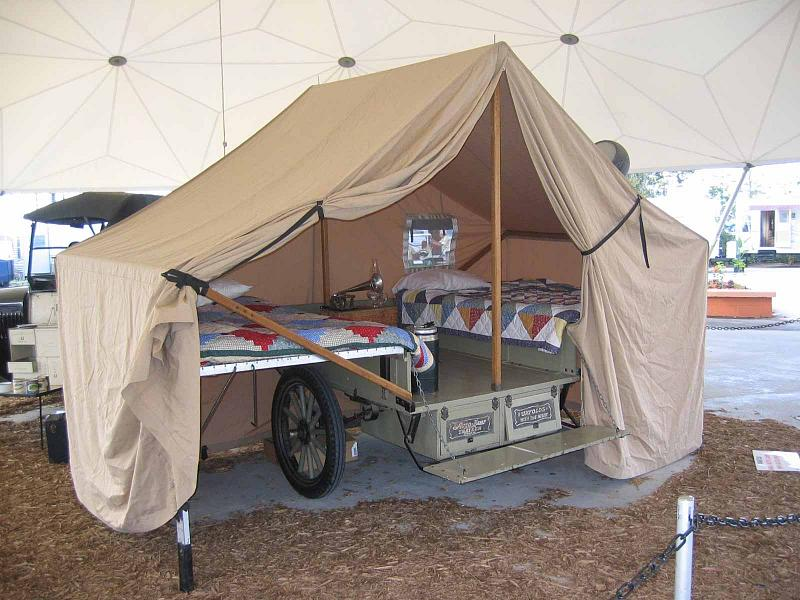
Travel trailer Model T 1925 b

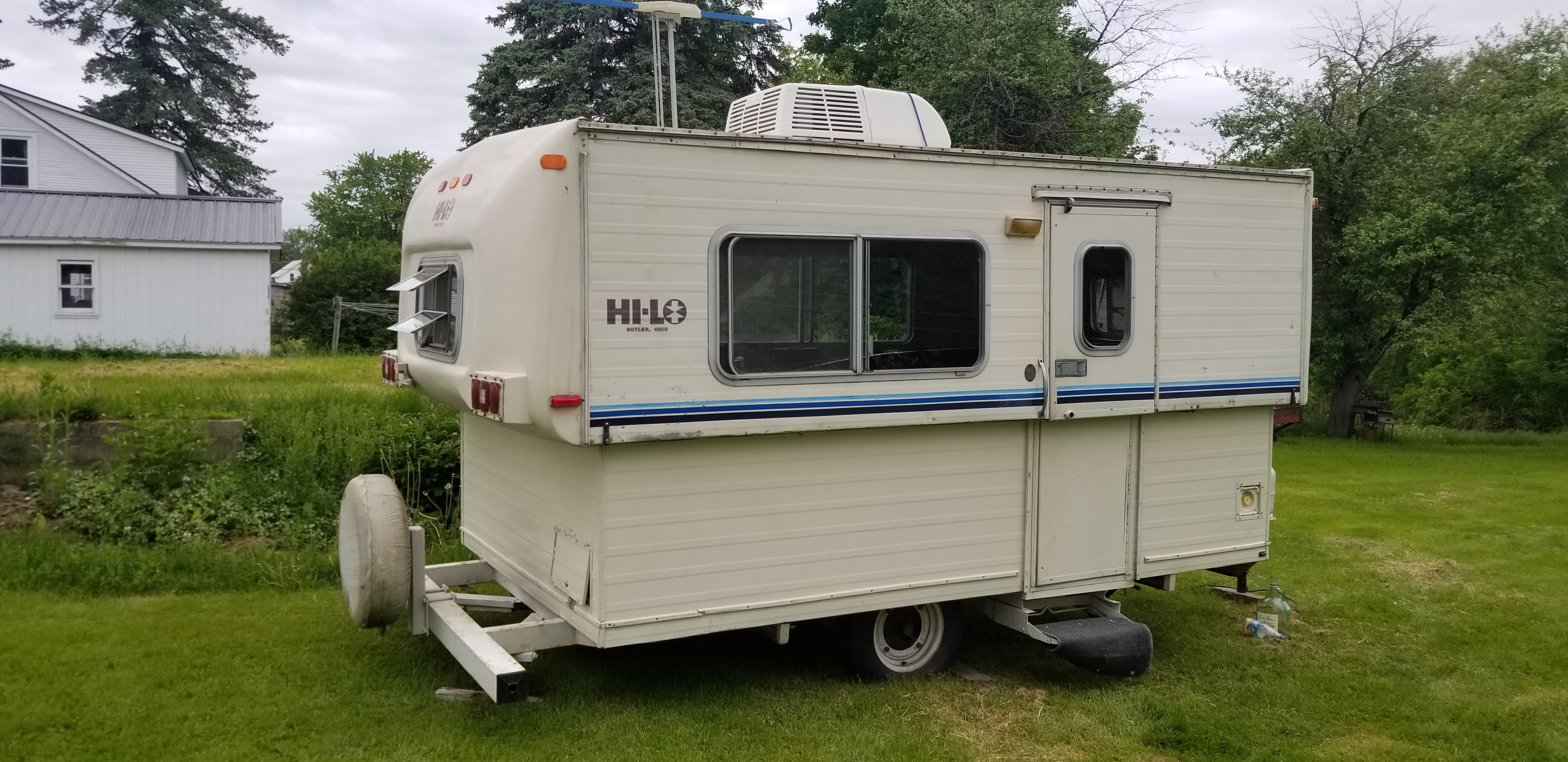
Hi Lo trailers are hard shell pop ups.

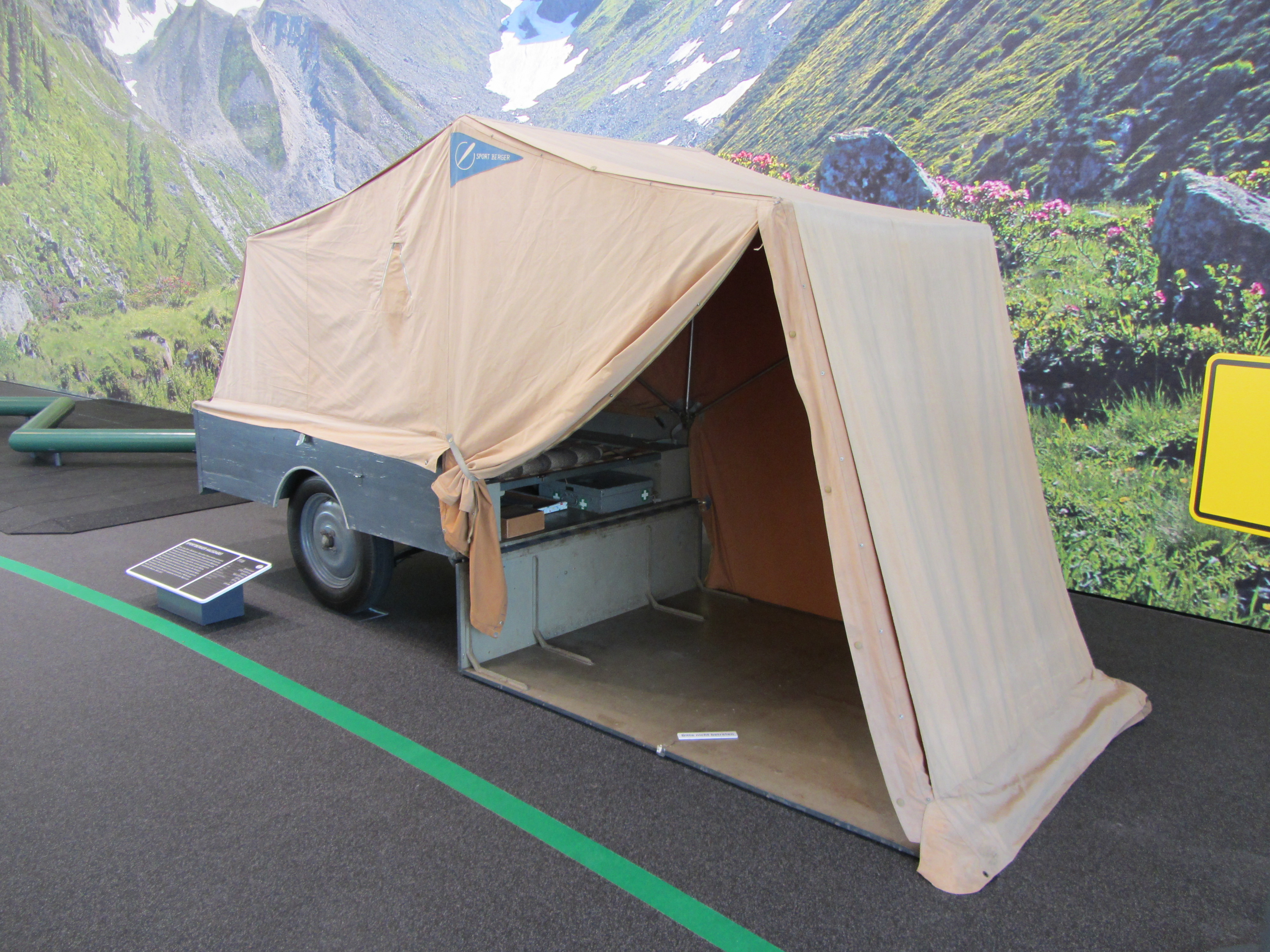
German Flip-out tent trailer from 1935

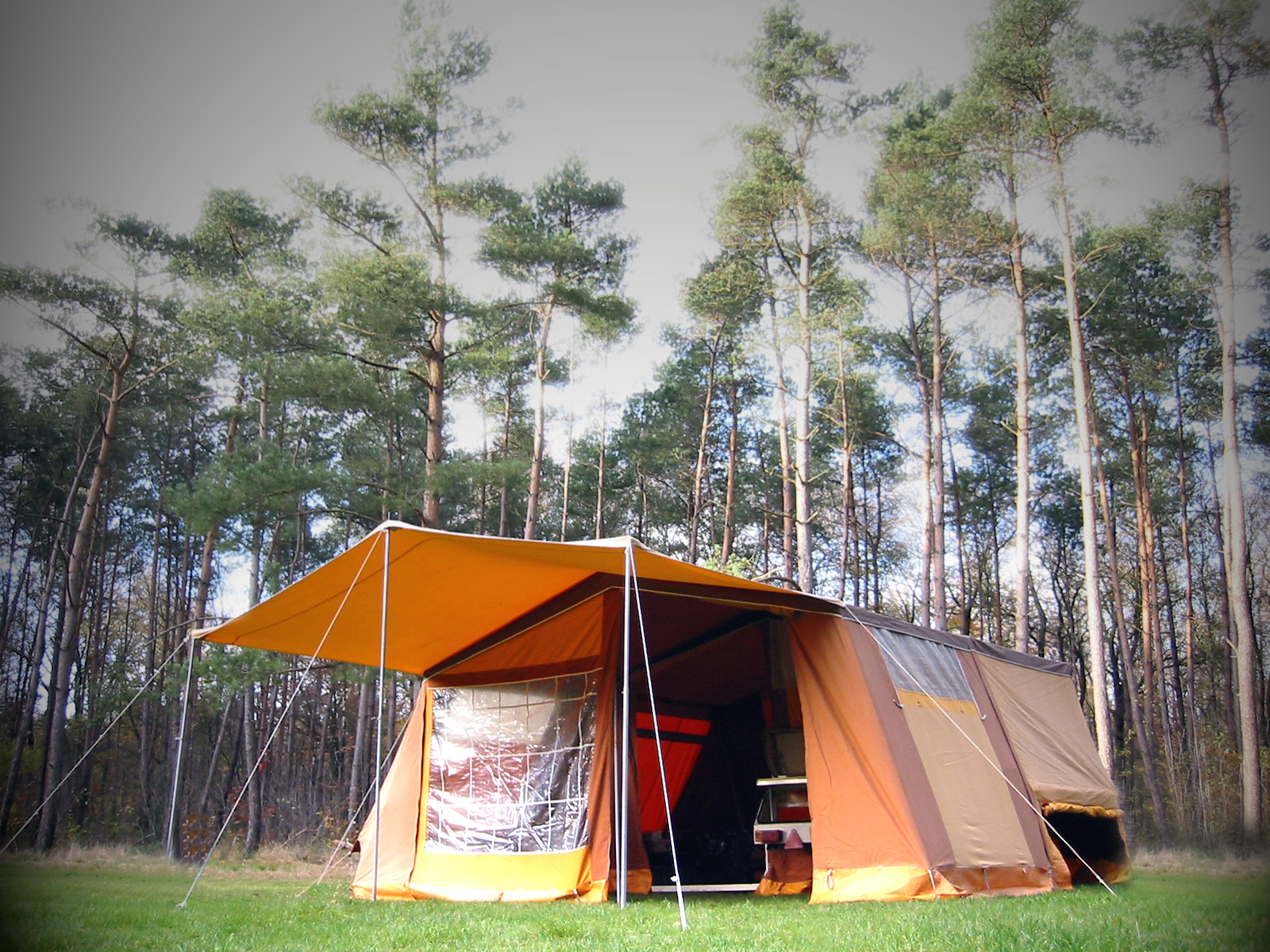
European tent trailer from 1976

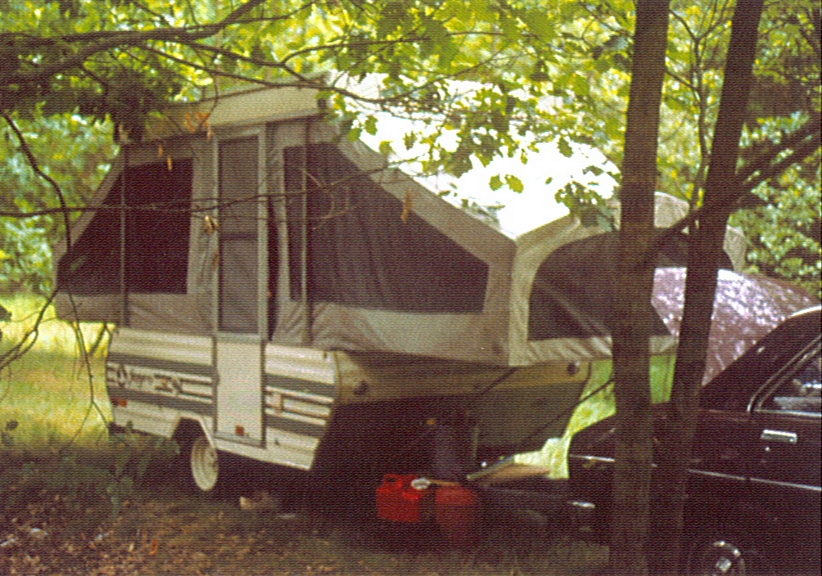
Pop-up camper from 1980s or 1990s

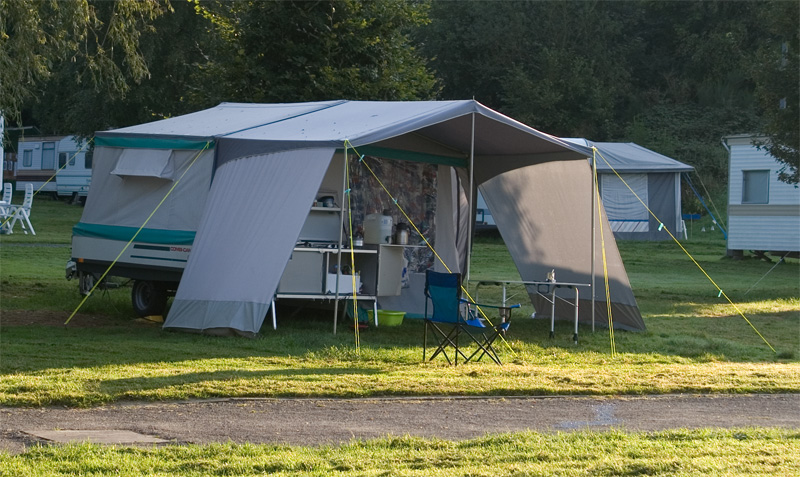
Modern tent trailer

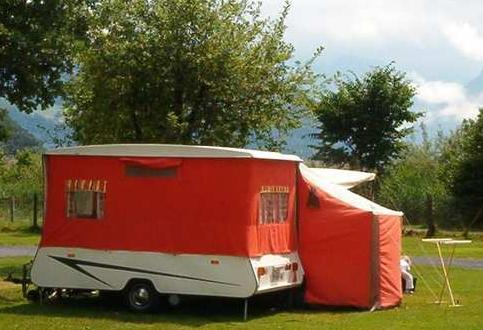
Pop-up camper from 1990s

== See also ==
- Caravan (trailer)
- Recreational vehicle
- Roof tent
- Trailer (vehicle)
