= Recreational vehicle =

Types of vehicles

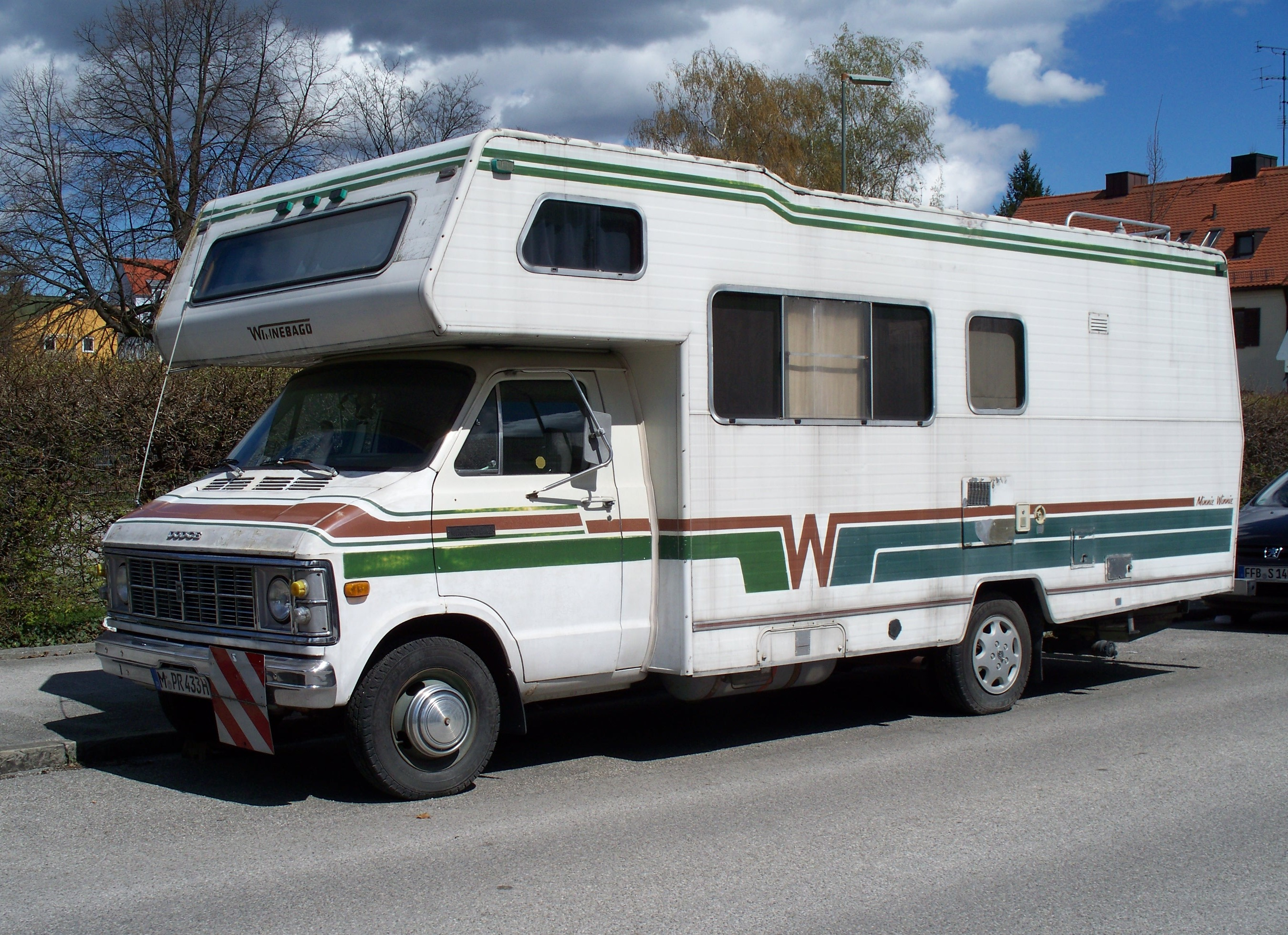
An example of a Class C recreational vehicle, recognisable by the extension of the cabin over the cab

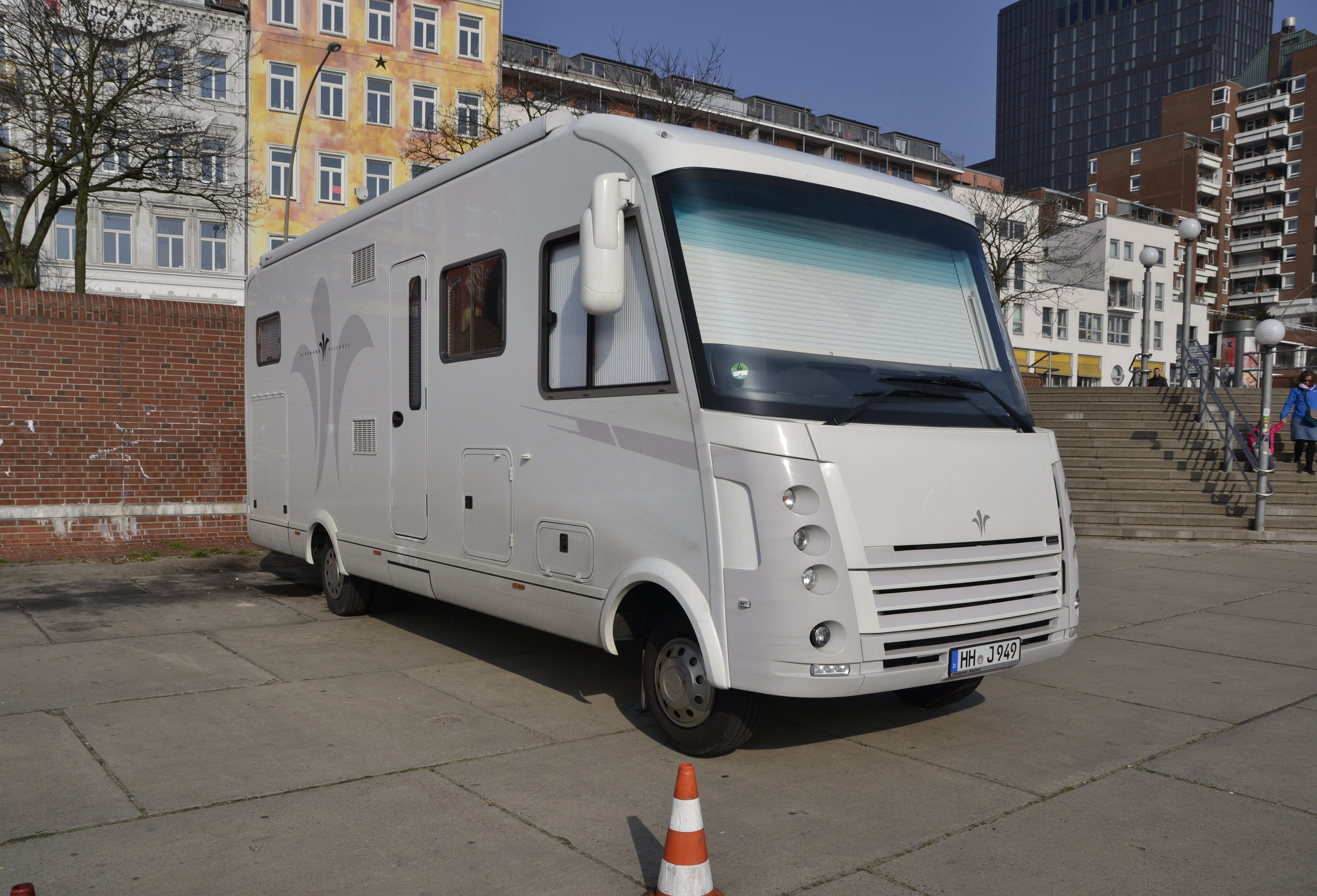
A motorhome by Niesmann+Bischoff in Hamburg

A recreational vehicle, often abbreviated as RV, or a camping car, is a motor vehicle that includes living quarters designed for accommodation. Types of RVs include motorhomes, coaches, and truck campers.

Typical amenities of an RV include a kitchen, a bathroom, and one or more beds. RVs can range from utilitarian – containing only sleeping quarters and basic cooking facilities – to luxurious, with features like air conditioning (AC), water heaters, televisions and satellite receivers, and quartz countertops.

== Types ==
RVs can be either trailers that are towed by vehicles or vehicles that can be driven themselves. Most RVs have one level, but there are also some with two levels. To save space while traveling, larger RVs often have slide-outs or canopies that open up when parked. RVs that can be driven can be categorized "motorhomes", which will have the engine in front, whereas some have engines in the rear. Those with rear engines are called pushers. Generally, pushers use diesel fuel, while pullers use gasoline, thought this trend has change in modern times to include more diesel options for front engine RVs.

Recreational vehicle types
Name	Image	Type	Length	Description
Camper or Travel trailer		Trailer	13 to 35 ft (4.0 to 10.7 m)	Uses tow hitch attached to rear frame of towing vehicle
Fifth wheel		Trailer	17 to 57 ft (5.2 to 17.4 m)	Uses fifth-wheel coupling centered above rear axle of towing vehicle. The largest fifth-wheel trailers, such as from Spacecraft, are semi-trailers that range from 40 to 57 ft (12.1 to 17.4 m), fitted with air brakes, and require a tractor unit as a towing vehicle.
Folding / Pop-up		Trailer	8 to 16 ft (2.4 to 4.9 m)	With collapsable sides that are stowed during towing
Class A (Integrated)		Motorhome	26 to 45 ft (7.9 to 13.7 m)	Typically built on heavy-duty bus chassis or proprietary motorhome chassis. The largest Class A motorhomes, known as “diesel pushers,” feature rear-mounted diesel engines and have air brakes.
Class B (Semi-integrated)		Motorhome	17 to 23 ft (5.2 to 7.0 m)	Typically vans with elevated rooflines
Class C (Alcove)		Motorhome	20 to 30 ft (6.1 to 9.1 m)	Typically built on cutaway van chassis with bunk over cab area
Super C (Truck-based alcove)		Motorhome	30 to 45 ft (9.1 to 13.7 m)	Typically built on a cutaway light to heavy-duty truck chassis with bunk over cab area, powered by diesel engines and feature air brakes similar to Class A “diesel pushers.” The largest Super C motorhomes are based on Class 8 semi-tractor unit chassis and have significantly higher towing capacity than Class A motorhomes.
Truck camper		Insert	8 ft (2.4 m) or more	Carried in bed area of pickup truck
Expedition vehicle		Motorhome	24 ft (7.3 m) or more	Class 4 to Class 7 truck with 4x4, or Class 8 vocational truck with 6x6 or 8x8. It is closely related to the Super C motorhome, but with higher ground clearance and off-road capability as a Class B.

== History ==
=== Early RVs ===
The first recreational vehicles were horse-drawn. They evolved during the second half of the nineteenth century as adaptations of vehicles used for other purposes, including public transport caravans (UK, also known as stage wagons), gypsy vardos (Europe), living vans (UK), ambulance wagons (US) and sheep herders wagons (US).

The first, currently-known, purpose-built RV was the horse-drawn Wanderer (UK), commissioned from the Bristol Wagon Works Company by Dr. Gordon Stables in 1884. Stables was a pioneer of the UK's Gentlemen Gypsy movement (1885–1914) which promoted the restorative benefits of horse-drawn leisure caravanning and inspired the formation of the world's first RV club, The Caravan Club (UK), in 1907. The Wanderer was closely followed by the McMaster Camping Car (US,1889).Camping-vehicle In the 1890s, US RV pioneers self-built timber 'houses on wheels' for health, leisure and hunting purposes. The most widely reported of these were those of Morgan Lasley and his family. Horse-drawn RV use declined after the First World War as many horses were killed during the war and automobiles became cheaper, more powerful and more widely available.

The first powered RVs were steam-drawn trailers from France including the Grande Diligence of Prince Oldenburg (1896) and the De Dion Bouton trailer of Monsieur Rénodier (1898). The first steam-driven motorhome was the Quo Vadis (France,1900) and the first gasoline-driven motorhome was the Passe Partout (France, 1902). The first recorded powered motorhomes in America were the 'camp cars' of Roy Faye and Freeman Young of 1904–06 (a 1904 Rambler, 1905 Thomas Flyer and 1906 Matheson). Lightweight tent trailers were especially popular in the US from 1911, thanks to improved roads, new national parks and the affordability of tow vehicles such as the Ford Model T. At the other end of the price scale, luxury touring limousines, developed in France by De Dietrich in 1904, were built in small numbers in the US by Welch (1909) and Pierce Arrow (1910). The first US RV club, the Tin Can Tourists, was formed in 1919. The first known recreational fifth wheeler was the Auto Salon Deluxe built in Belgium for Baron Crawhez by Auto-Mixte Pescatore in 1913.

=== Wider development ===
In the early twentieth century RV builders in the UK (Navarac, Piggott Bros, Eccles, Bertram Hutchings), the US (Detroit Trailer Company, Welch, Graham Brothers, Pierce-Arrow) and France (De Dietrich, Cadel) experimented with a wide range of RV types including caravans and trailers, motorhomes, touring limousines, tent trailers and fifth wheelers. Early motorhomes ('house cars' in the US) were usually converted goods trucks and were heavy, noisy, inflexible and expensive, restricting their use to the wealthy or self-builders. The 'one box' RV was not seen in large numbers until the small, lightweight Volkswagen Kombi of 1950. During the 1920s and 1930s, caravans (travel trailers) became the dominant form of RV in the UK due to their low cost, weather-resistance and flexibility. There was likewise a travel trailer boom in the US in the 1930s as automobile production-line manufacturing techniques were used in travel trailer manufacturing to meet growing demand from recreational users and those seeking low-cost housing during The Great Depression. Self-built trailers were highly popular in the US during the 1930s and travel trailers featured in a number of Hollywood movies including Mickey's Trailer (1938).

The 1920s and 1930s, saw some influential, maverick builders construct innovative RVs in small numbers. These included Bertram Hutchings (UK, 1930–39, streamlined caravans), Charles Louvet (France, 1924–34, aircraft-inspired, coach-built motorhomes and trailers), Noel Pemberton Billing (UK, 1927, Road Yacht motorhome), Glenn Curtiss (US, 1918–30, Adams Motorbungalo, Curtiss Aerocar, Aero Coupler hitch) and William Hawley Bowlus (US, 1934, aluminum monocoque trailers). Wally Byam's Airstream (US, 1931 onwards) was a successful trailer builder of the period and is the only survivor of over 400 pre-WW2 US RV manufacturers. These early advancements in RV and trailer design established the foundation for a burgeoning industry that would continue to develop over the subsequent decades.

Prior to WW2 a number of other countries developed their own small-scale RV manufacturing industries including Germany, Australia, New Zealand and the Netherlands. Germany had a particular focus on small, lightweight caravans towable by low-cost automobiles whilst Australia developed 'pop-top' caravans with good ventilation, ample water storage and high ground clearance. During WW2 RV production was halted in most countries except when required as accommodation for military personnel or essential workers.

Map symbol used by the US NPS to indicate an RV campground

=== Post-war recreation ===
Between 1945 and 1960, RVs flourished in many western countries as disposable income and leisure time grew. Dedicated RV parks were established to cater to the needs of both short and long-term RV users. Improvements in RV technology including batteries, fridges, gas cookers, toilets and lightweight construction techniques dramatically improved RV comfort levels. More powerful gasoline and diesel engines allowed RVs to increase in size, weight and speed. Regulations were introduced in many countries to control how RVs were manufactured and used.

=== 21st century ===
As of 2016, the average age of RV owners in the United States was 45, a three-year decrease since 2015. Per 2020 research reports, more millennials are interested in buying RVs due to their increased demand for camping and outdoor recreational activities, especially in the US.

Due to the COVID-19 pandemic, sales of RVs in the United States have increased, and as of March 2021, 11.3 million households own an RV, which is a 26 percent increase over the past ten years. In October 2021, 58,000 RVs were manufactured in North America, the most ever in a single month. Wholesale recreational vehicle shipments during the first four months of 2021 rose more than 86% over 2020, because consumer demand for RVs has soared since the pandemic's onset. Analysts expect industry revenue to increase 1.1% through 2026 as U.S. residents continue to plan domestic trips because of continued travel restrictions around the globe.

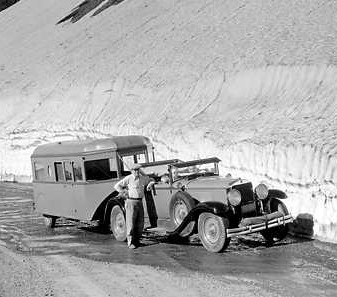
1933 car and tourist observation trailer

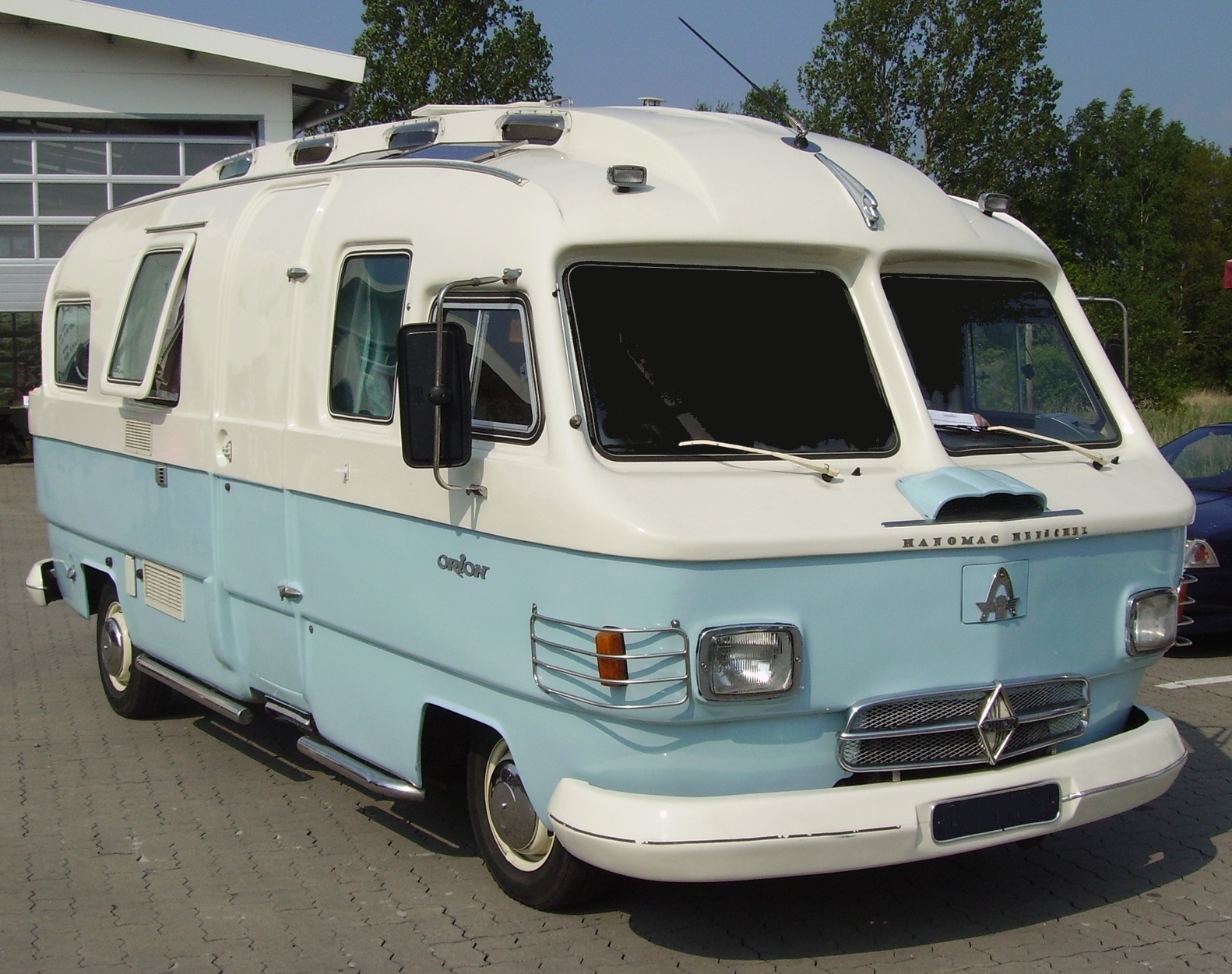
1970s Hanomag-Henschel Orion

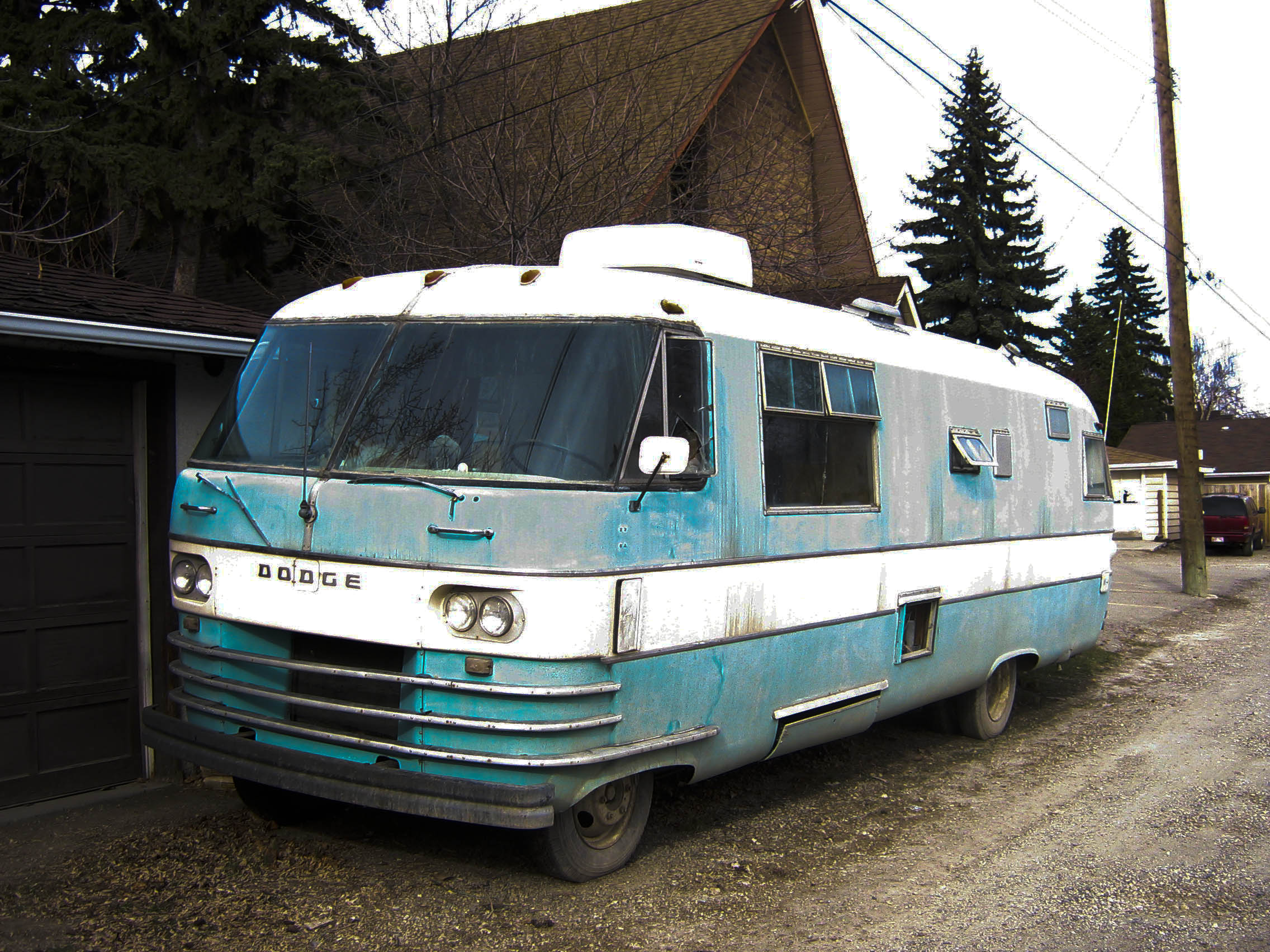
1970s Dodge Travco

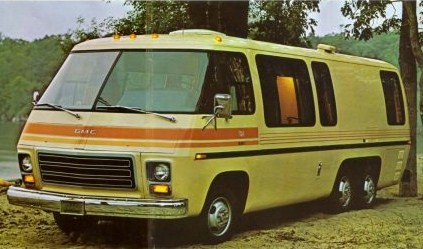
1973 GMC Motorhome

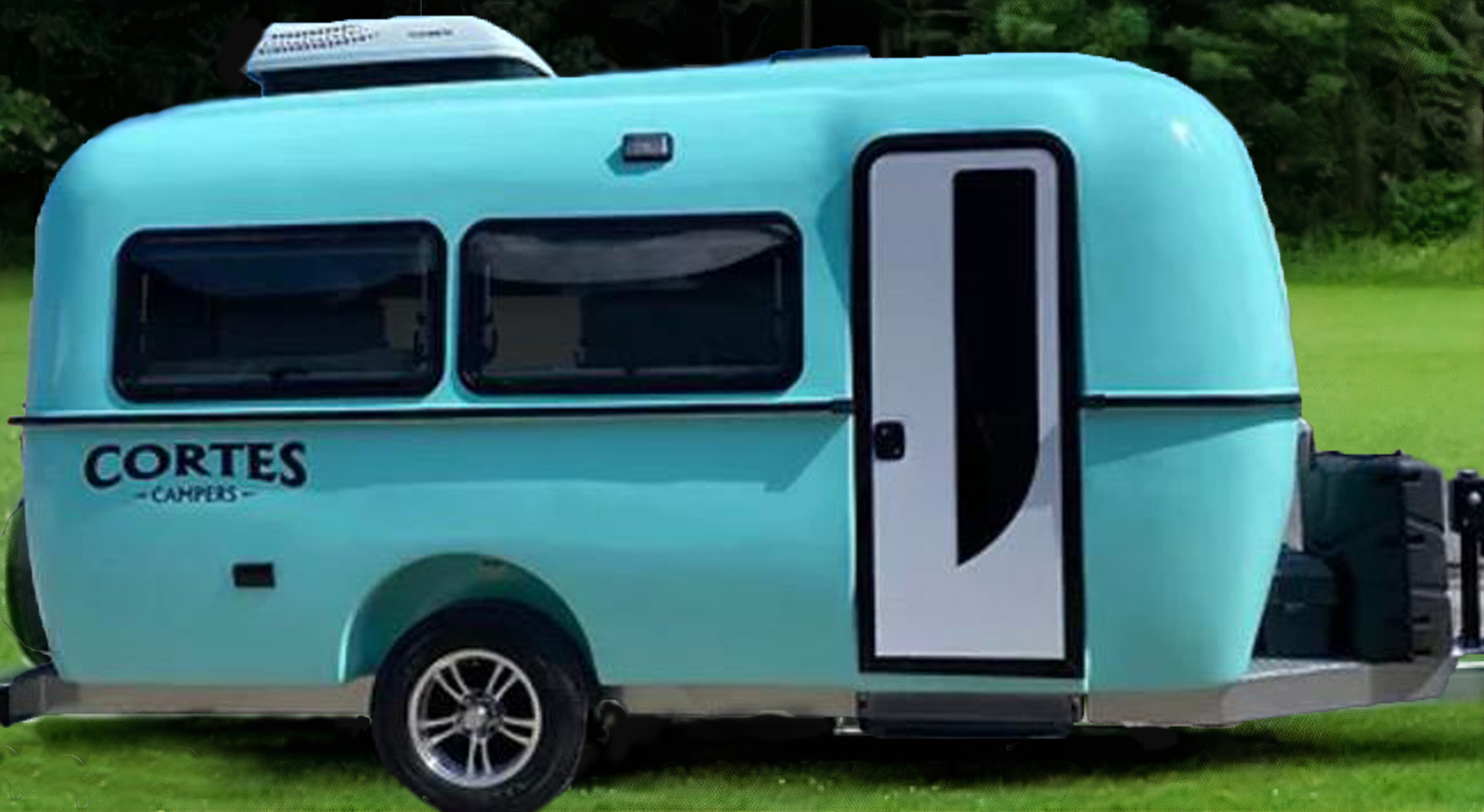
100% fiberglass double hull trailers are lighter, more cost efficient, more durable. Built like boats, the interior can be pressure washed.

== Industry ==
In the United States, about 85 percent of recreational vehicles sold are manufactured in Indiana, and roughly two-thirds of that production in Elkhart County, which calls itself "the RV Capital of the World", population 206,000. The industry has US$32.4 billion annual economic impact in Indiana, pays US$3.1 billion in taxes to the state and supports 126,140 jobs and US$7.8 billion in wages, according to the RV Industry Association.

The recreational vehicle industry around Elkhart is part of a large network of related transport equipment companies, including utility trailer makers and specialty bus manufacturers, who source from the same supply chains. The industry has taken hits from US tariffs on steel and aluminum and other duties on RV parts made in China, from plumbing fixtures to electronic components to vinyl seat covers. Tariff-related price hikes forced manufacturers to pass on some of the increased costs through higher RV prices, which in turn has contributed to slower sales. Shipments of RVs to dealers fell 22% percent in the first five months of 2019, compared to the same period a year earlier, after dropping 4% in 2018.

== Usage ==
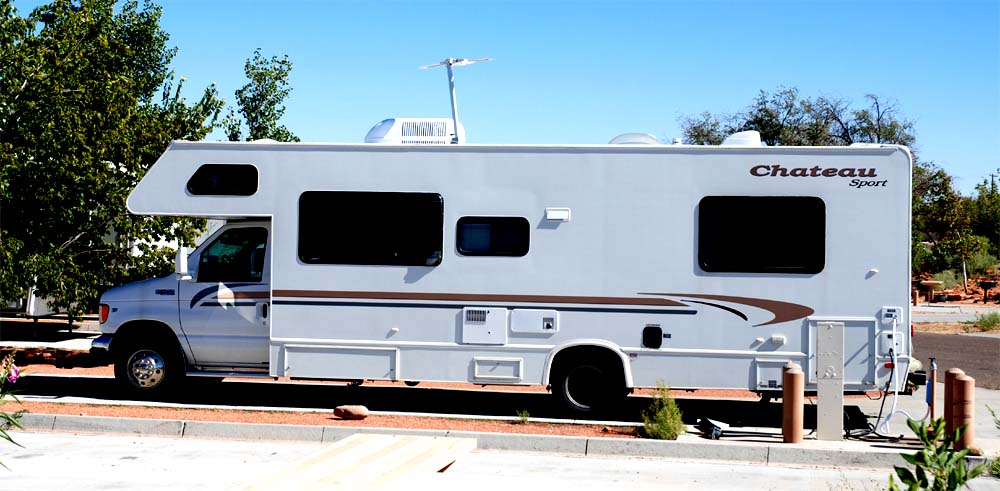
Class-C motorhome

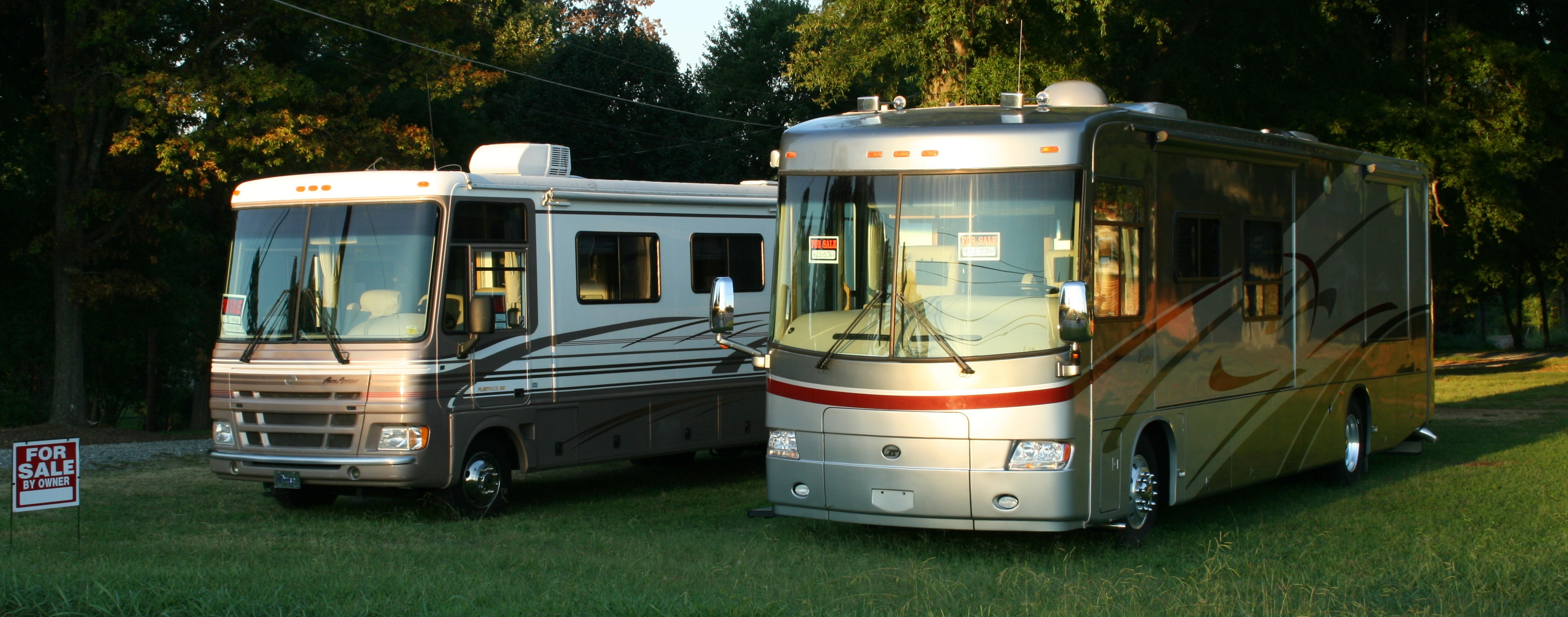
Class-A motorhomes

RVs are most commonly used for living quarters while traveling. People may choose to take a road trip in their RV and use the RV to sleep in, rather than a hotel room. They may even decide to tow their car from the back of the RV so they can use that to travel around more easily when they reach their destination.

Although the most common usage of an RV is as temporary accommodation when traveling, some people use an RV as their main residence. In fact, one million Americans live in RVs. In Australia, the slang term for a retired person who travels in a recreational vehicle is a "grey nomad".

While it is legal in all of the United States to live in an RV, there are laws regarding where and for how long RVs can be parked.

Some owners fit solar panels to the roof of their RV. It is possible for RV users to live off the electrical grid while still having access to internet, making remote working feasible.

Usage of RVs is common at rural festivals such as Burning Man, but most festivals have strict rules about operating an RV during the event. Burning Man is strict about RV water leaks, and generator usage is another of the restrictions that festivals put on the use of RVs.

RVs are a form of housing for homeless people. About a million people in the US live full-time in RVs, according to the RV Industry Association; some of them just can’t afford normal housing, but many do it by choice.

== Environmental impact ==
RVs are significant emitters of air pollutants and contribute nearly 10 percent of U.S. mobile-source hydrocarbon emissions and about three percent of carbon monoxide emissions as measured in 2000. Because of this, they pose risks to air quality, human health and visibility in natural areas.

Recreational activities in natural areas can cause soil compaction, erosion, vegetation loss and wildlife disturbance. A review of 105 scientific studies found that off-road vehicle use can damage soil, vegetation and wildlife habitats. Studies of recreational campsites have also documented soil compaction, vegetation loss and tree damage.

The RV industry is the biggest consumer of tropical wood in the United States. Demand for lauan plywood for use in recreational vehicles is driving large-scale deforestation in Indonesian Borneo, destroying rainforests, peatlands, and wildlife habitats while displacing Indigenous communities.

Although conservation groups have documented the R.V. industry’s reliance on timber from recently cleared forests, major manufacturers deny knowledge of deforested wood in their supply chains.

== See also ==
- Alternative housing
- Fulltiming
- Housetrucker
- Motorhome
- List of recreational vehicle manufacturers
- List of recreational vehicles
- Living Vehicle
- Recreational vehicle terms
- Rest area
- RV park
- Tiny-house movement
- Vardo (Romani wagon)
- Van-dwelling
- Breaking Bad
