= Roof tent =

Tent fitted to a motor vehicle

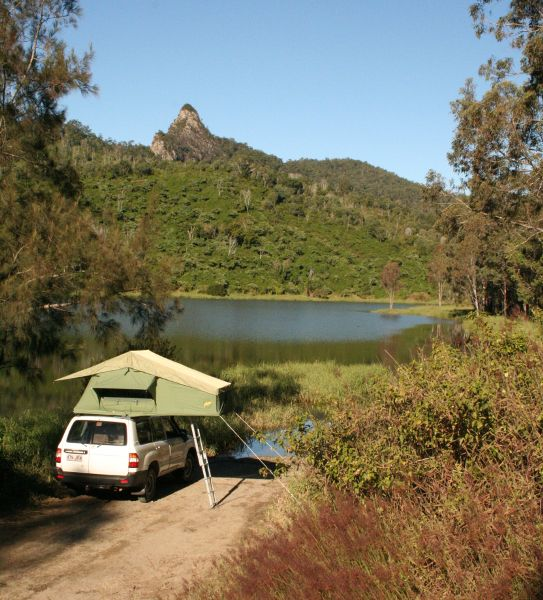
Gordigear roof tent on a Toyota Land Cruiser

A roof tent or rooftop tent is an accessory that may be fitted to the roof or bed of a motor vehicle that allows the users to sleep in relative safety and comfort above the vehicle, and leaves the internal load-space free. The first example of roof tents appeared in Western Europe in the 1930s.

Rooftop tents are available in a range of sizes but most are designed to accommodate two adults comfortably. Some models have room for a 3rd occupant like a child, small adult or pet. Based on their size and relative ease of setup, rooftop tents are popular with solo campers as well as couples that enjoy camping.

== Story ==
The first rooftop tent was featured in the magazine Popular Science Monthly in January 1937. It consisted of a foldable steel frame mounted on the roof of a car and, when unfolded, was supported by a structure at the front of the vehicle, which also served as the access point via a ladder. It was not until 1958 that the Italian company Autohome, based in Rivarolo Mantovano, patented and began manufacturing rooftop tents for motor vehicles.

== Designs and styles ==
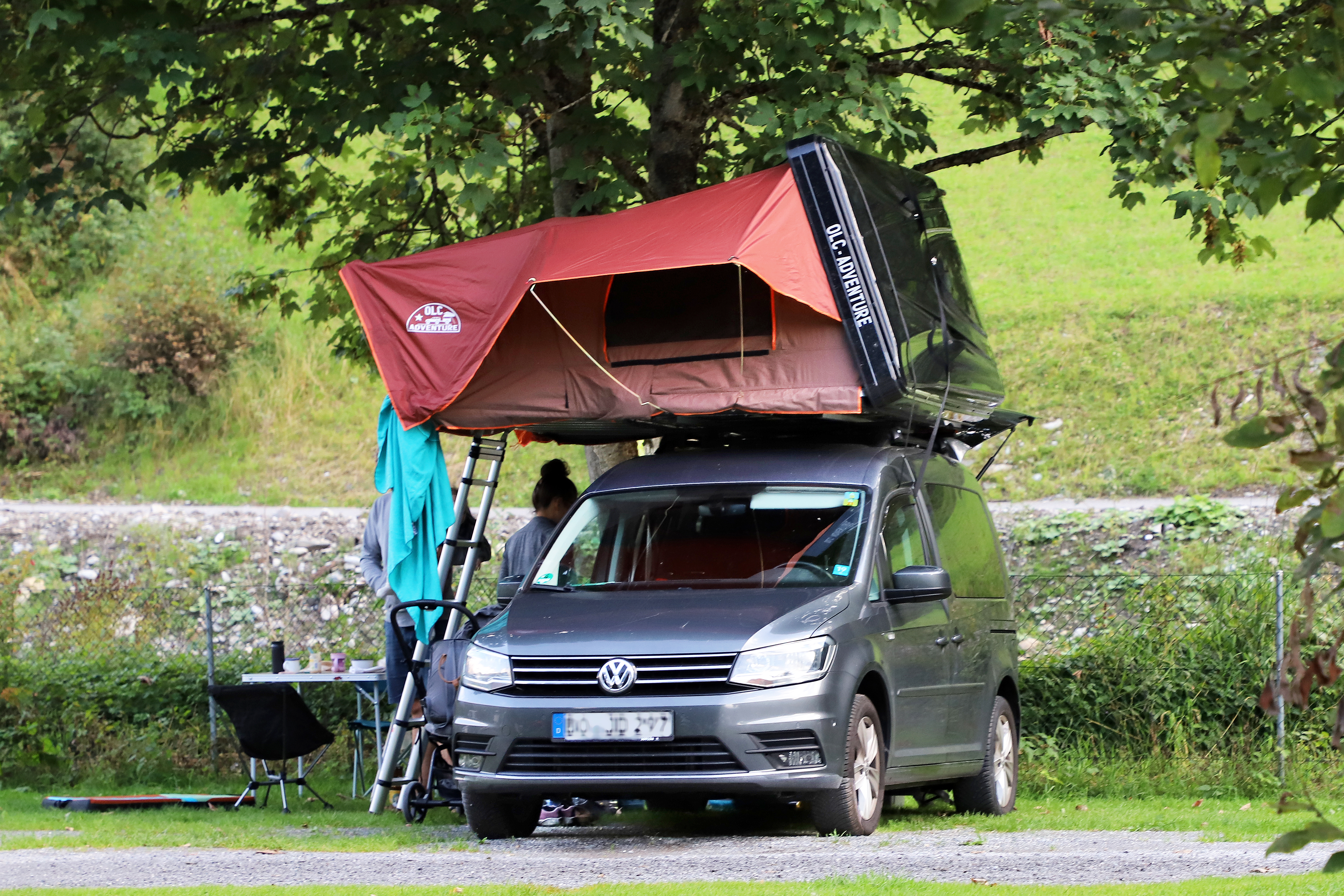
An example of a hybrid roof tent.

Roof tents have traditionally taken the form of a conventional ridge-pole tent which can be folded into a compact package, resting on marine plywood, and mounted on a roof rack. Beginning in 1958, more modern tent designs appeared - housed in a waterproof, moulded fibreglass or carbon fibre box, and are erected and taken down more quickly using a simple crank-operated cantilever arrangement or gas rams that automatically erect the tent when the latches are released.

There are three types of roof tent available:

- Softshell - A soft removable canvas cover which opens likes a pop-up book into a traditional looking canvas body tent.
- Hardshell - A hard shell cover made of fibreglass, aluminium or ABS which opens vertically to form the roof of the tent with canvas sides.
- Hybrid - A hard shell cover made of fibreglass, aluminium or ABS which opens like a pop-up book with a canvas body, some hybrid roof tent designs use the top shell to form a wall of the tent body.

Each of these types have their advantages and disadvantages and with the advances in manufacturing and materials, new variations of these types are being designed year-on-year.

== See also ==
- Autohome
- Camping
- Off-roading
- Overlanding
